= Blansko (administrative district) =

Administrative district in the South Moravian Region, Czech Republic

Administrative district of the municipality with extended powers of Blansko Správní obvod obce s rozšířenou působností Blansko
- Administrative district of municipality with extended powers
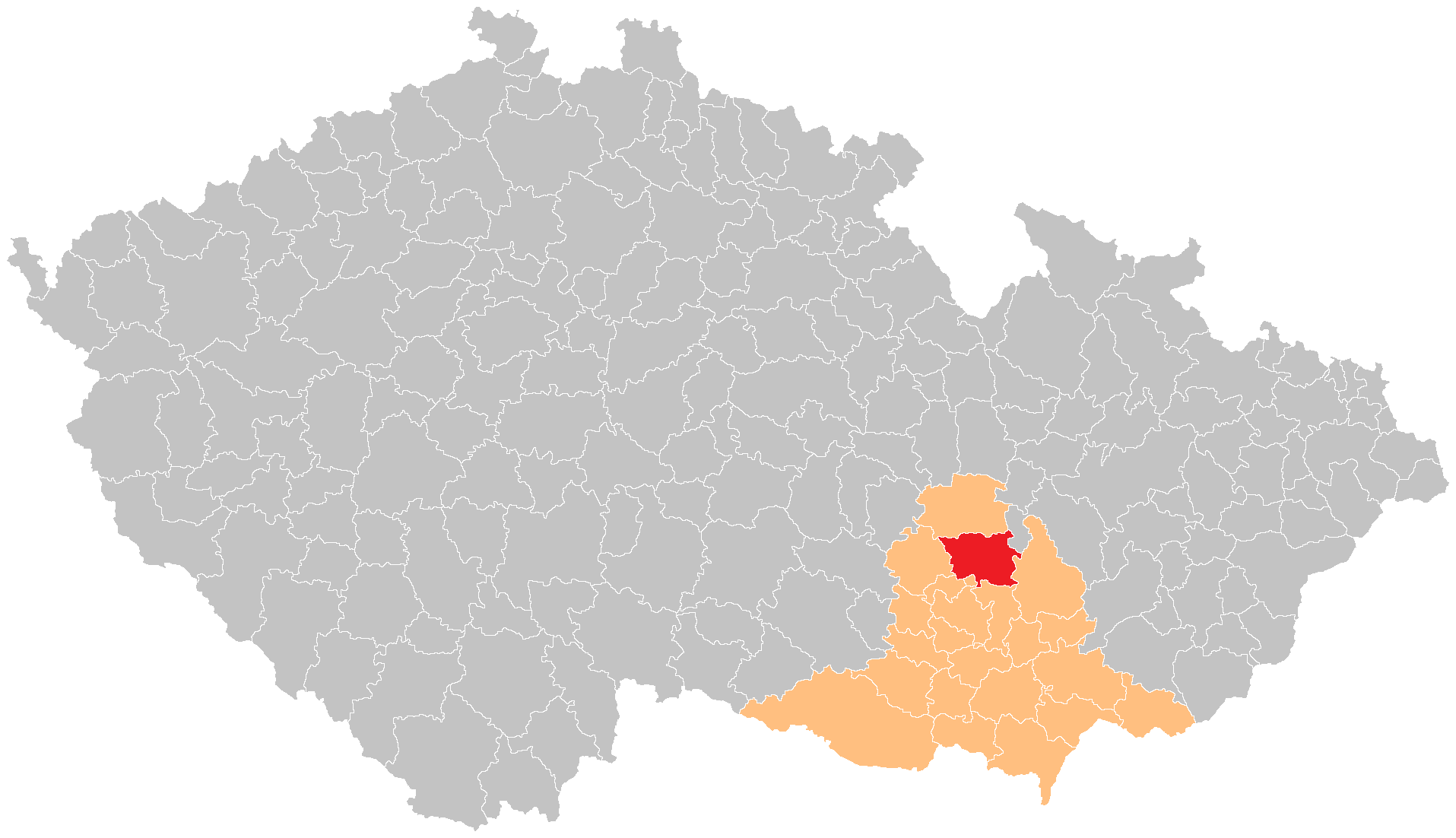
- Location in the South Moravian Region within the Czech Republic
- Coordinates: 49°22′N 16°39′E
- Country: Czech Republic
- Region: South Moravian
- District: Blansko
- Municipality with extended powers: Blansko

Area
  - Total: 351.41 km^{2} (135.68 sq mi)

Population (2024)
  - Total: 57,412
  - Density: 163.38/km^{2} (423.14/sq mi)
- Time zone: UTC+1 (CET)
  - Summer (DST): UTC+2 (CEST)
- Municipalities: 43
- * Cities and towns: 3
- * Market towns: 6

The administrative district of the municipality with extended powers of Blansko (abbreviated AD MEP Blansko; Czech: Správní obvod obce s rozšířenou působností Blansko, SO ORP Blansko) is an administrative district of municipality with extended powers in Blansko District in the South Moravian Region of the Czech Republic. It has existed since 1 January 2003, when the districts were replaced administratively. It includes 43 municipalities which have a combined population of about 57,000.

== Municipalities ==
Cities and towns are in bold, and market towns are in italics.

Municipality	Population	Area (km^{2)}	Density
**Adamov**	4,605	3.78	1,218
**Blansko**	20,185	44.97	448
Bořitov	1,300	9.98	130
Brťov-Jeneč	354	7.45	48
Bukovina	464	2.73	170
Bukovinka	641	8.48	76
Býkovice	273	5.13	53
Černá Hora	2,141	16.29	131
Dlouhá Lhota	135	5.30	25
Doubravice nad Svitavou	1,356	10.69	126
Habrůvka	418	9.95	42
Holštejn	160	6.47	25
Jedovnice	2,982	14.24	209
Kotvrdovice	917	5.58	164
Krasová	484	4.07	118
Křtiny	820	11.18	73
Kulířov	161	3.41	47
Kuničky	260	4.29	61
Lažany	453	2.60	174
Lipovec	1,212	11.56	104
Lipůvka	1,486	9.92	149
Lubě	104	3.53	29
Malá Lhota	158	2.63	60
Milonice	173	2.59	67
Olomučany	1,084	15.13	72
Ostrov u Macochy	1,107	8.82	125
Petrovice	648	5.00	129
**Rájec-Jestřebí**	3,732	15.67	238
Ráječko	1,363	5.02	271
Rudice	983	4.96	198
Senetářov	592	13.84	43
Sloup	991	7.65	129
Spešov	662	3.31	200
Svinošice	395	7.33	54
Šebrov-Kateřina	830	10.29	81
Šošůvka	685	5.12	133
Újezd u Černé Hory	275	4.50	61
Vavřinec	896	12.20	73
Vilémovice	345	5.23	66
Vysočany	763	12.12	63
Závist	151	0.42	359
Žďár	398	5.09	78
Žernovník	270	2.87	94

== Demographics ==
Historical population

Year	Pop.	±%
1869	30,319	—
1880	32,220	+6.3%
1890	33,023	+2.5%
1900	35,307	+6.9%
1910	38,599	+9.3%

Year	Pop.	±%
1921	38,897	+0.8%
1930	39,959	+2.7%
1950	39,930	−0.1%
1961	45,716	+14.5%
1970	48,295	+5.6%

Year	Pop.	±%
1980	53,169	+10.1%
1991	54,093	+1.7%
2001	53,805	−0.5%
2011	55,152	+2.5%
2021	56,023	+1.6%

Source: Censuses
