= Svinošice =

- Municipality
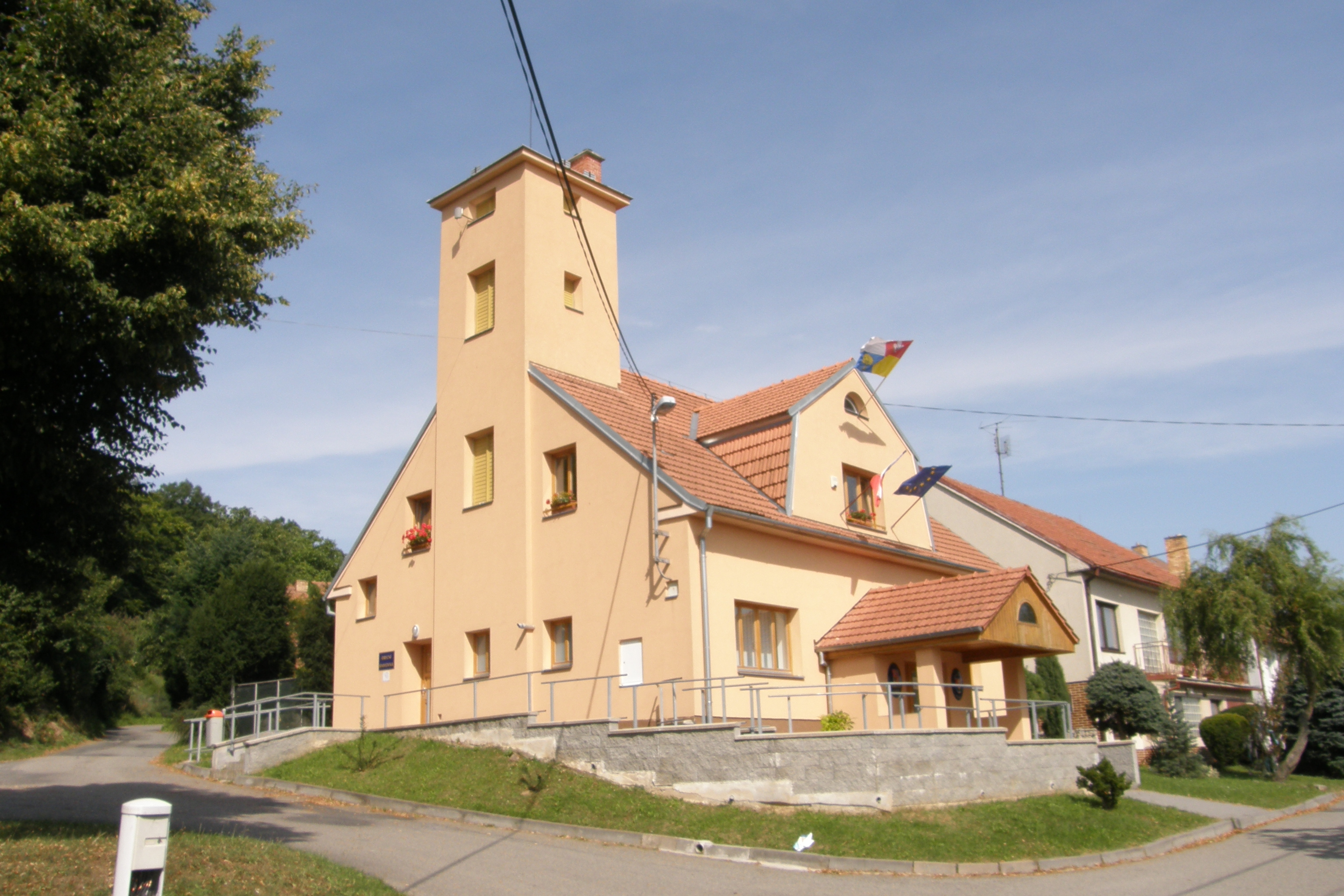
- Municipal office

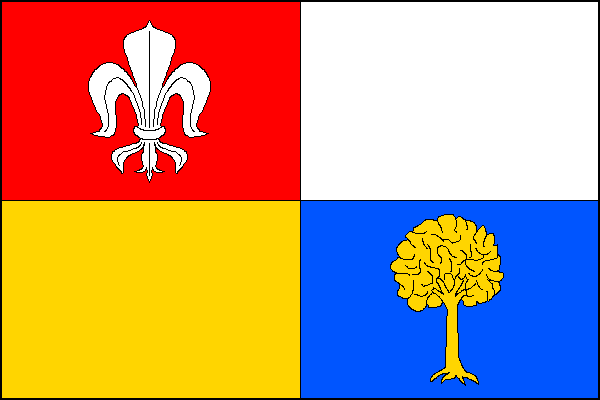
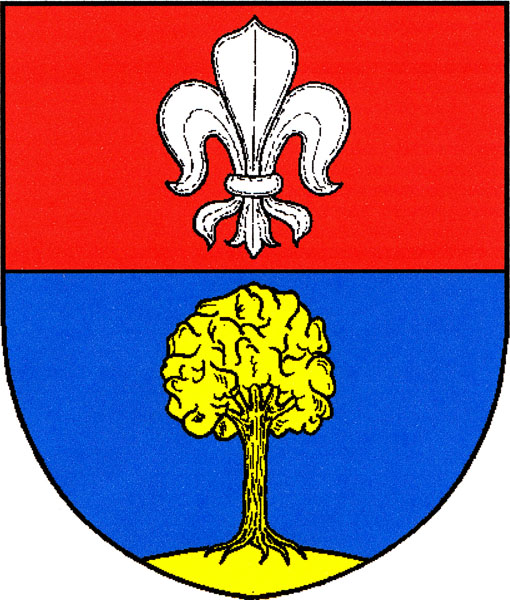
- Flag Coat of arms

- Location in the Czech Republic
- Coordinates: 49°20′4″N 16°34′33″E
- Country: Czech Republic
- Region: South Moravian
- District: Blansko
- First mentioned: 1210

Area
  - Total: 7.33 km^{2} (2.83 sq mi)
- Elevation: 387 m (1,270 ft)

Population (2026-01-01)
  - Total: 396
  - Density: 54.0/km^{2} (140/sq mi)
- Time zone: UTC+1 (CET)
  - Summer (DST): UTC+2 (CEST)
- Postal code: 679 22
- Website: svinosice.cz

Svinošice is a municipality and village in Blansko District in the South Moravian Region of the Czech Republic. It has about 400 inhabitants.

Svinošice lies approximately 7 kilometres (4 mi) south-west of Blansko, 16 km (10 mi) north of Brno, and 177 km (110 mi) south-east of Prague.

== Demographics ==
Historical population
Year	Pop.	±%
1869	317	—
1880	341	+7.6%
1890	329	−3.5%
1900	357	+8.5%
1910	361	+1.1%
1921	320	−11.4%
1930	341	+6.6%
1950	320	−6.2%
1961	295	−7.8%
1970	288	−2.4%
1980	228	−20.8%
1991	209	−8.3%
2001	253	+21.1%
2011	346	+36.8%
2021	409	+18.2%
Source: Censuses
