= Újezd u Černé Hory =

- Municipality
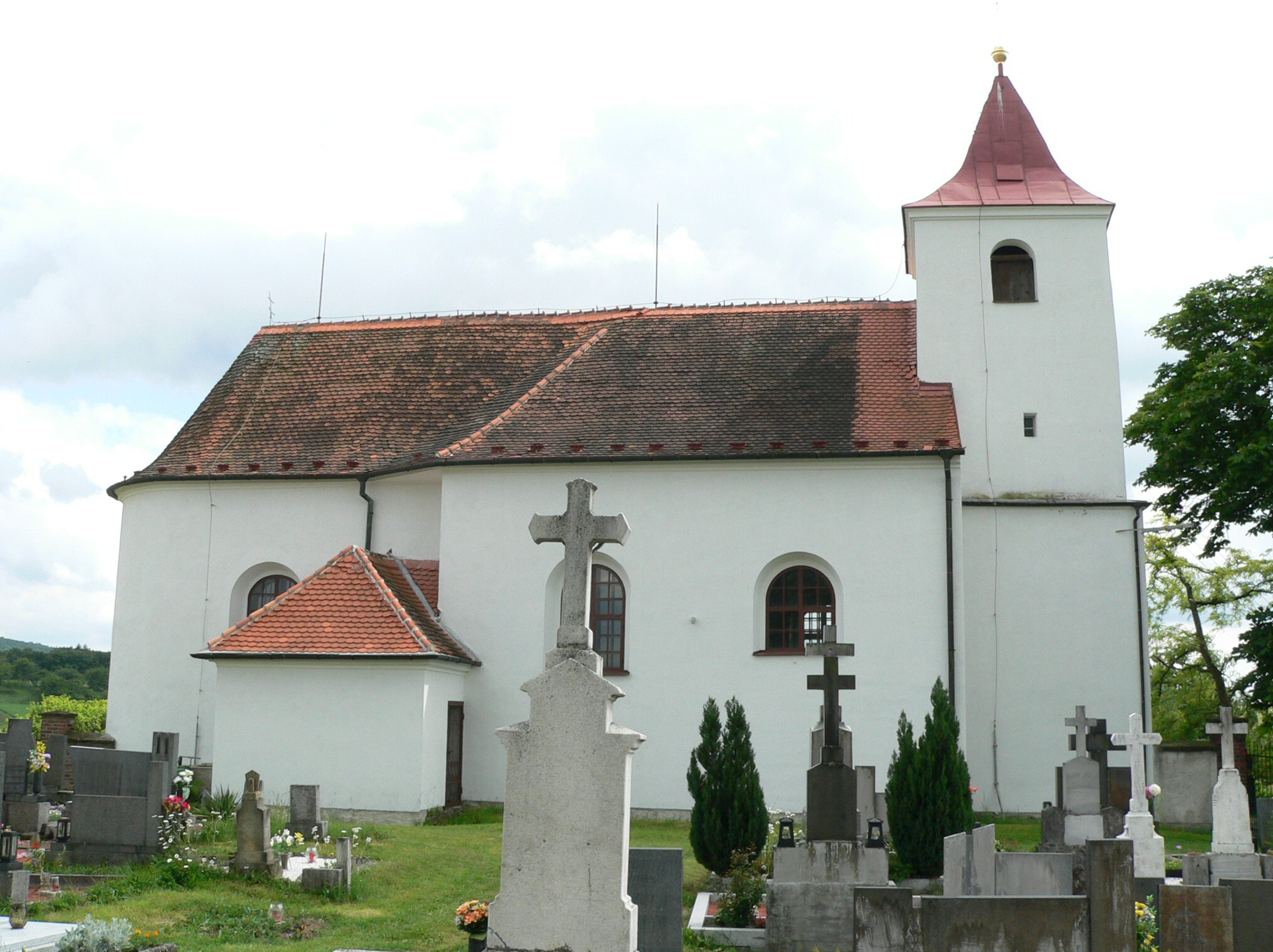
- Church of All Saints

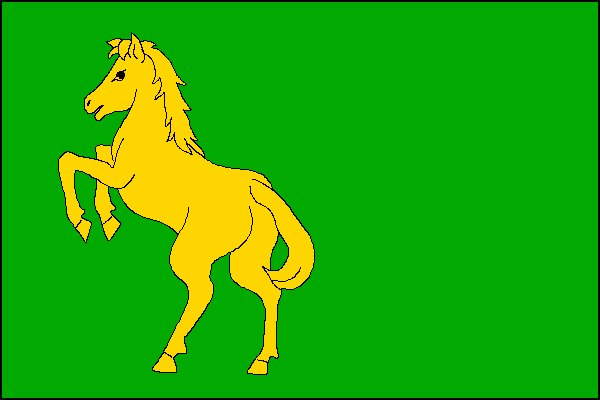
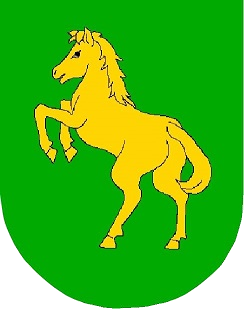
- Flag Coat of arms

- Location in the Czech Republic
- Coordinates: 49°22′7″N 16°32′28″E
- Country: Czech Republic
- Region: South Moravian
- District: Blansko
- First mentioned: 1308

Area
  - Total: 4.50 km^{2} (1.74 sq mi)
- Elevation: 365 m (1,198 ft)

Population (2026-01-01)
  - Total: 280
  - Density: 62/km^{2} (160/sq mi)
- Time zone: UTC+1 (CET)
  - Summer (DST): UTC+2 (CEST)
- Postal code: 679 22
- Website: www.ujezducernehory.cz

Újezd u Černé Hory is a municipality and village in Blansko District in the South Moravian Region of the Czech Republic. It has about 300 inhabitants.

Újezd u Černé Hory lies approximately 8 kilometres (5 mi) west of Blansko, 20 km (12 mi) north of Brno, and 173 km (107 mi) south-east of Prague.

== Demographics ==
Historical population
Year	Pop.	±%
1869	336	—
1880	343	+2.1%
1890	311	−9.3%
1900	339	+9.0%
1910	358	+5.6%
1921	351	−2.0%
1930	347	−1.1%
1950	298	−14.1%
1961	297	−0.3%
1970	268	−9.8%
1980	325	+21.3%
1991	280	−13.8%
2001	254	−9.3%
2011	239	−5.9%
2021	279	+16.7%
Source: Censuses
