= Petrovice (Blansko District) =

- Municipality
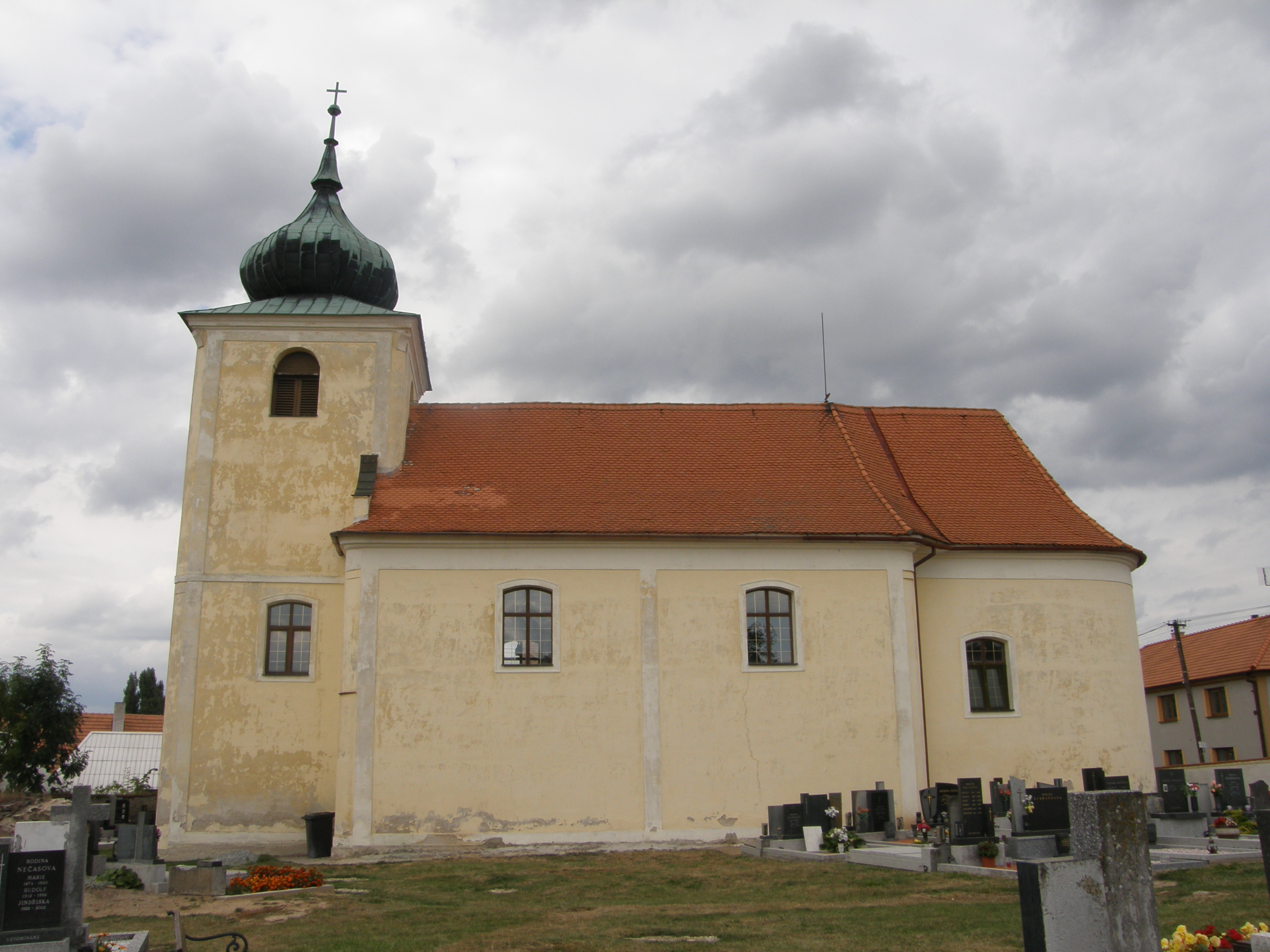
- Church of Saint Peter and Paul

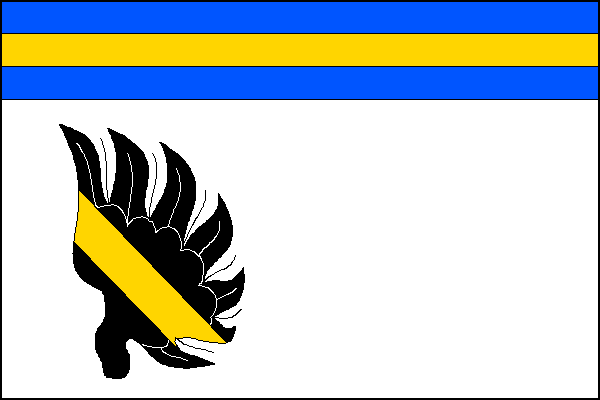
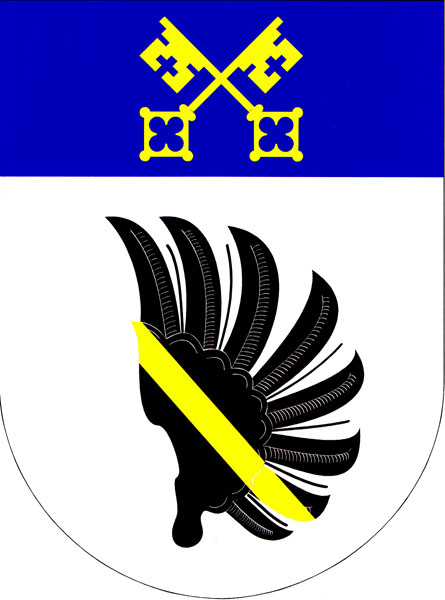
- Flag Coat of arms

- Location in the Czech Republic
- Coordinates: 49°24′43″N 16°41′59″E
- Country: Czech Republic
- Region: South Moravian
- District: Blansko
- First mentioned: 1374

Area
  - Total: 5.00 km^{2} (1.93 sq mi)
- Elevation: 547 m (1,795 ft)

Population (2026-01-01)
  - Total: 650
  - Density: 130/km^{2} (340/sq mi)
- Time zone: UTC+1 (CET)
  - Summer (DST): UTC+2 (CEST)
- Postal code: 679 02
- Website: www.oupetrovice.cz

Petrovice is a municipality and village in Blansko District in the South Moravian Region of the Czech Republic. It has about 700 inhabitants.

Petrovice lies approximately 6 kilometres (4 mi) north-east of Blansko, 24 km (15 mi) north of Brno, and 181 km (112 mi) south-east of Prague.

== Demographics ==
Historical population
Year	Pop.	±%
1869	514	—
1880	519	+1.0%
1890	537	+3.5%
1900	594	+10.6%
1910	586	−1.3%
1921	615	+4.9%
1930	636	+3.4%
1950	577	−9.3%
1961	546	−5.4%
1970	533	−2.4%
1980	445	−16.5%
1991	399	−10.3%
2001	419	+5.0%
2011	606	+44.6%
2021	633	+4.5%
Source: Censuses
