= Krasová =

- Municipality
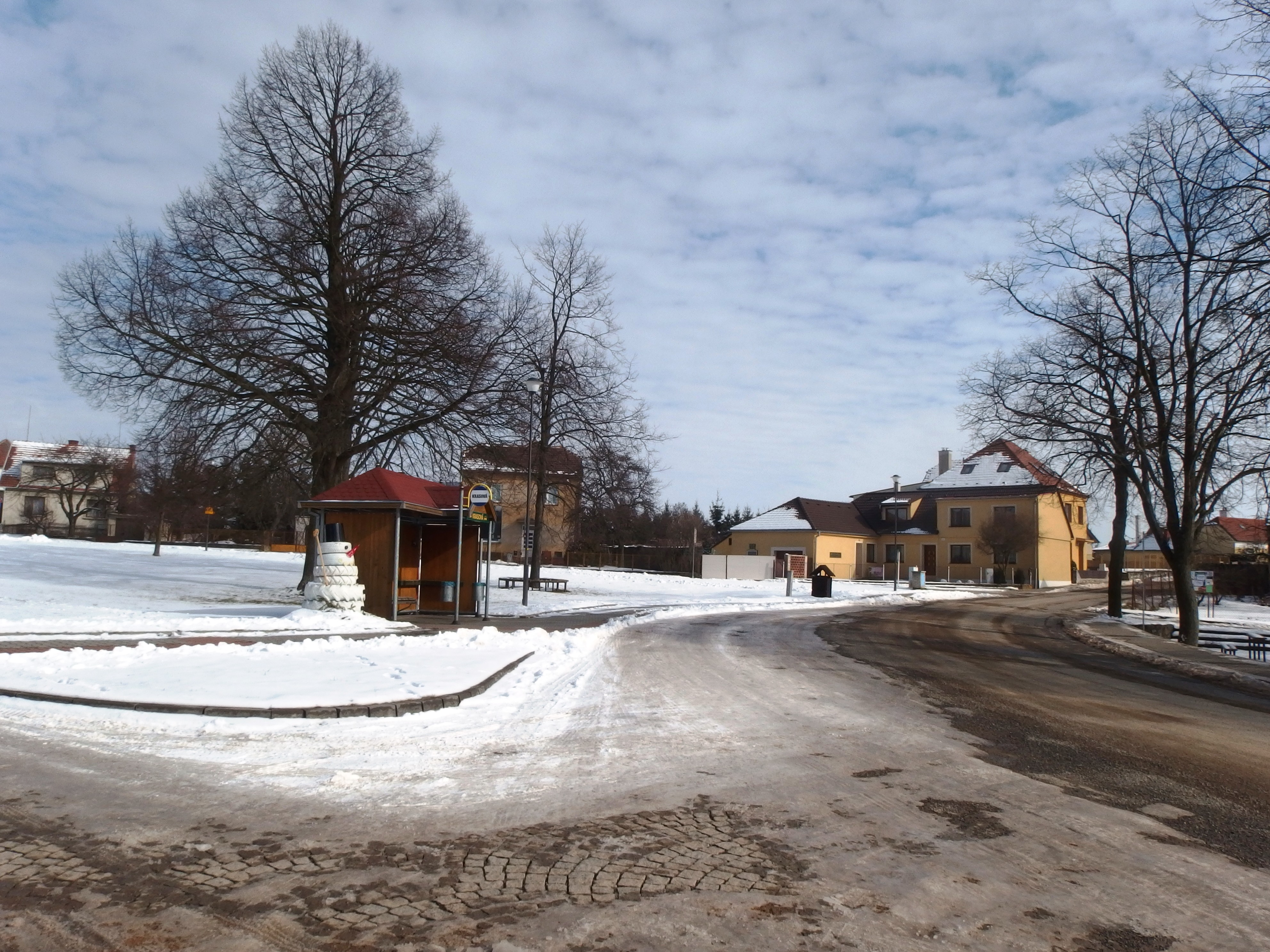
- Centre of Krasová

- Flag Coat of arms

- Location in the Czech Republic
- Coordinates: 49°21′41″N 16°46′5″E
- Country: Czech Republic
- Region: South Moravian
- District: Blansko
- Founded: 1717

Area
  - Total: 4.07 km^{2} (1.57 sq mi)
- Elevation: 534 m (1,752 ft)

Population (2026-01-01)
  - Total: 480
  - Density: 120/km^{2} (310/sq mi)
- Time zone: UTC+1 (CET)
  - Summer (DST): UTC+2 (CEST)
- Postal code: 679 06
- Website: www.krasova.cz

Krasová (German: Rogendorf) is a municipality and village in Blansko District in the South Moravian Region of the Czech Republic. It has about 500 inhabitants.

Krasová lies approximately 10 kilometres (6 mi) east of Blansko, 23 km (14 mi) north-east of Brno, and 188 km (117 mi) south-east of Prague.

== Demographics ==
Historical population
Year	Pop.	±%
1869	290	—
1880	322	+11.0%
1890	339	+5.3%
1900	342	+0.9%
1910	323	−5.6%
1921	328	+1.5%
1930	305	−7.0%
1950	290	−4.9%
1961	325	+12.1%
1970	329	+1.2%
1980	293	−10.9%
1991	257	−12.3%
2001	248	−3.5%
2011	291	+17.3%
2021	457	+57.0%
Source: Censuses
