= Býkovice =

- Municipality
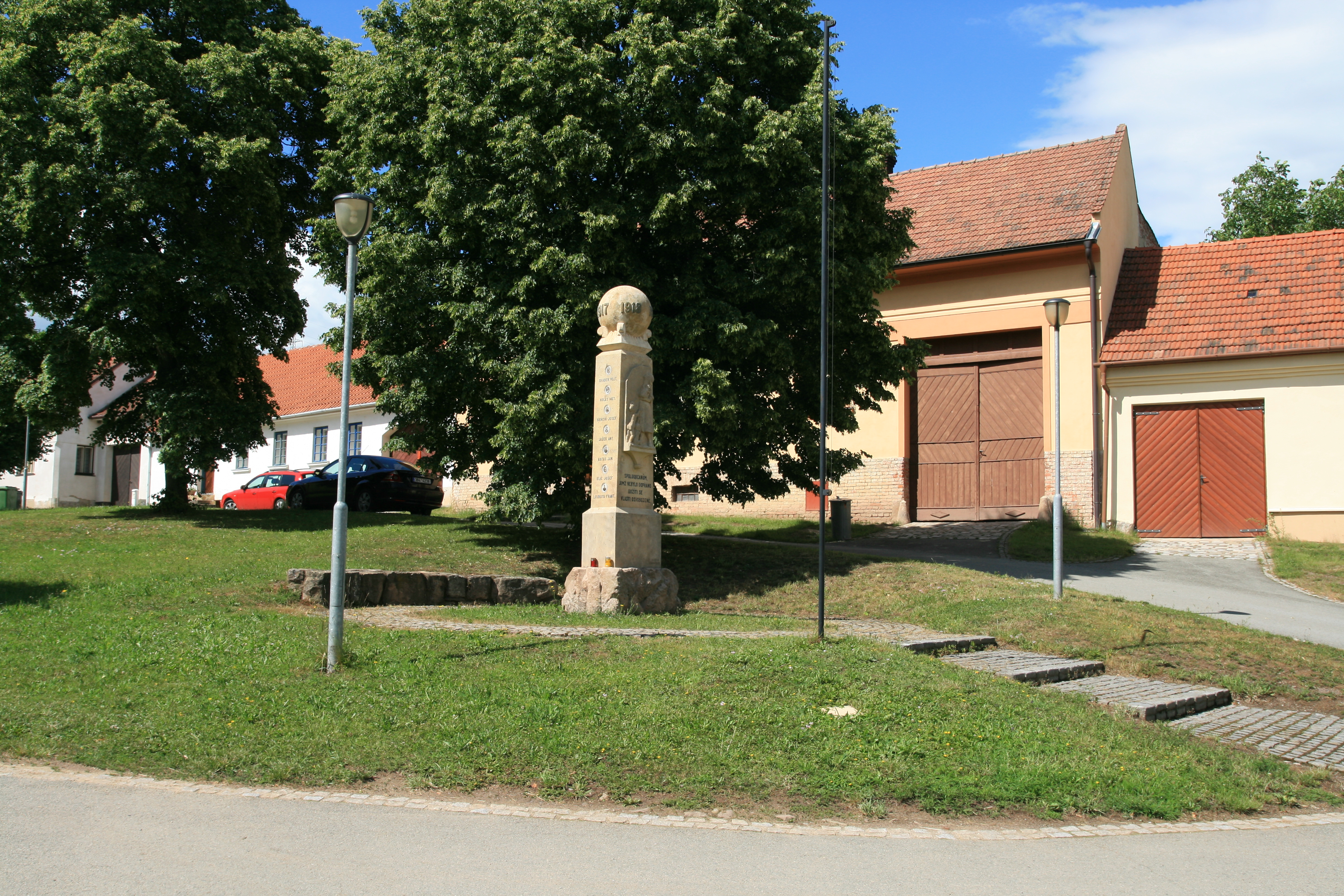
- Centre of Býkovice

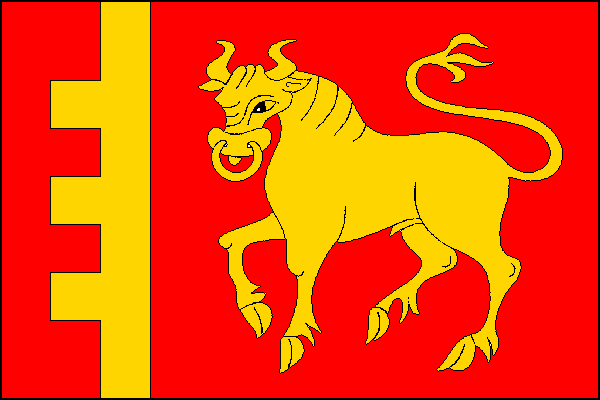
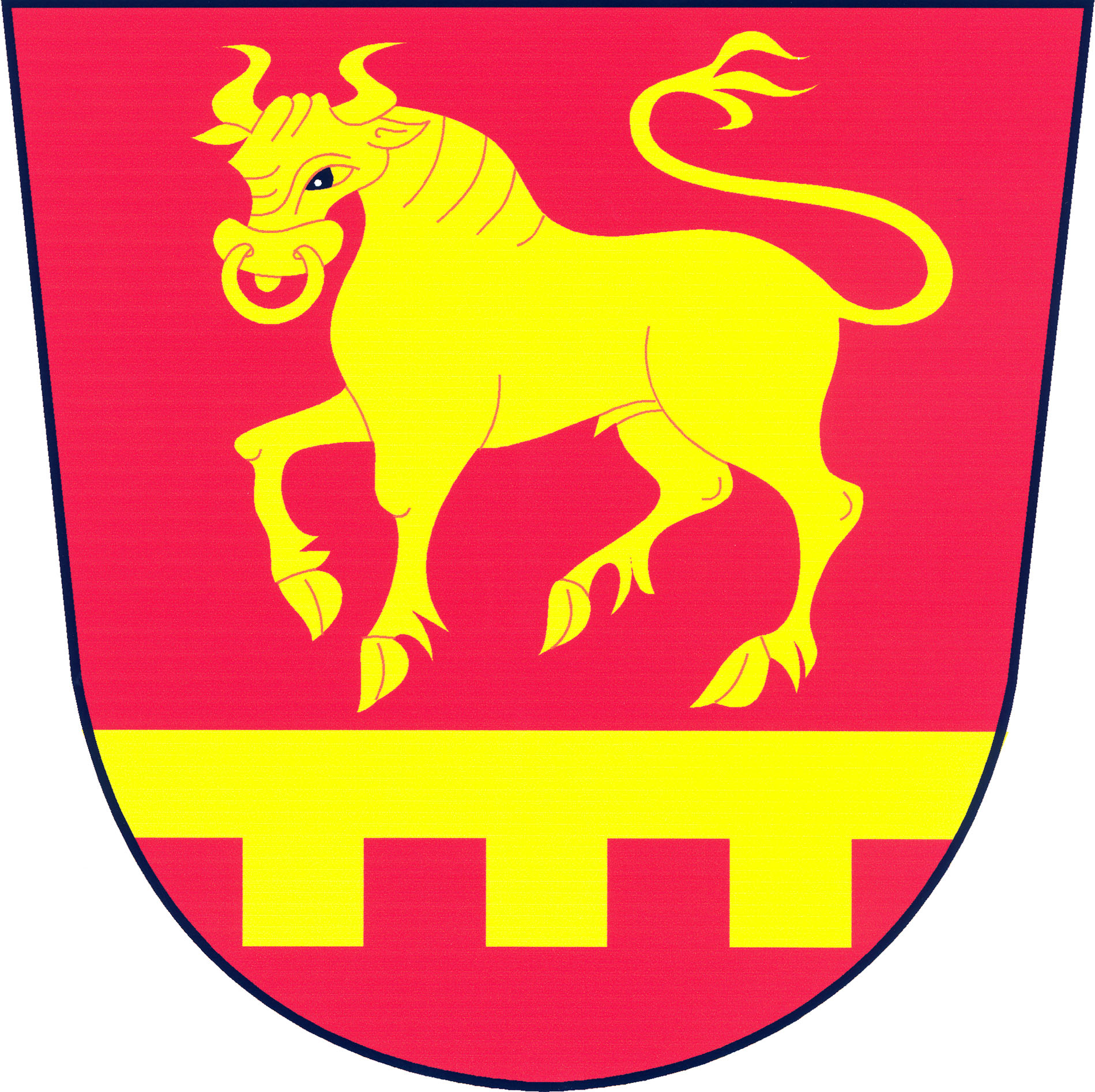
- Flag Coat of arms

- Location in the Czech Republic
- Coordinates: 49°25′49″N 16°32′18″E
- Country: Czech Republic
- Region: South Moravian
- District: Blansko
- First mentioned: 1264

Area
  - Total: 5.13 km^{2} (1.98 sq mi)
- Elevation: 384 m (1,260 ft)

Population (2026-01-01)
  - Total: 283
  - Density: 55.2/km^{2} (143/sq mi)
- Time zone: UTC+1 (CET)
  - Summer (DST): UTC+2 (CEST)
- Postal code: 679 71
- Website: www.obecbykovice.cz

Býkovice is a municipality and village in Blansko District in the South Moravian Region of the Czech Republic. It has about 300 inhabitants.

Býkovice lies approximately 11 kilometres (7 mi) north-west of Blansko, 27 km (17 mi) north of Brno, and 169 km (105 mi) south-east of Prague.

== History ==
The first written mention of Býkovice is from 1264.

== Demographics ==
Historical population
Year	Pop.	±%
1869	359	—
1880	344	−4.2%
1890	338	−1.7%
1900	341	+0.9%
1910	374	+9.7%
1921	379	+1.3%
1930	336	−11.3%
1950	293	−12.8%
1961	288	−1.7%
1970	260	−9.7%
1980	227	−12.7%
1991	190	−16.3%
2001	173	−8.9%
2011	200	+15.6%
2021	253	+26.5%
Source: Censuses
