= Ráječko =

- Municipality
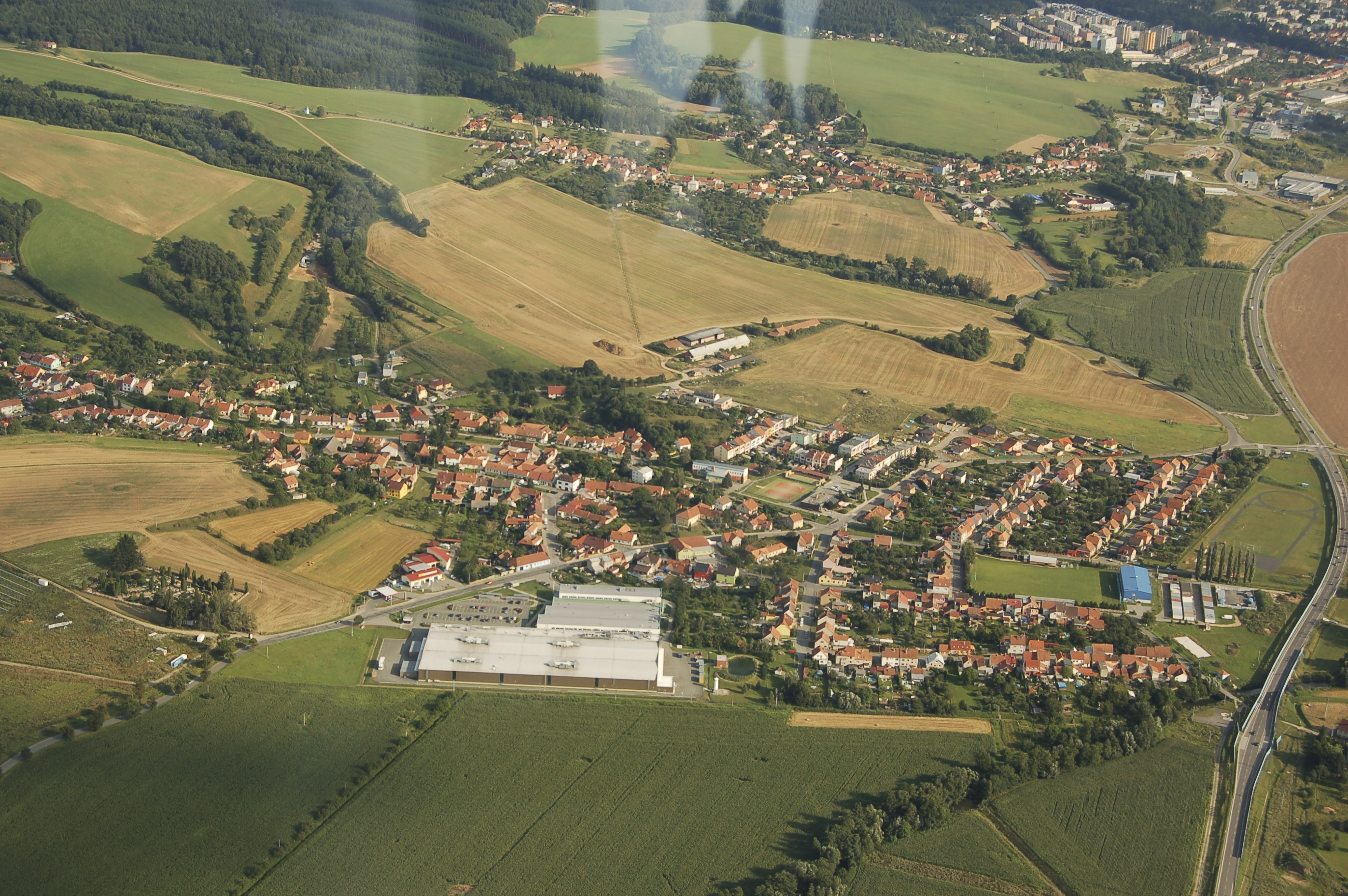
- Aerial view of Ráječko

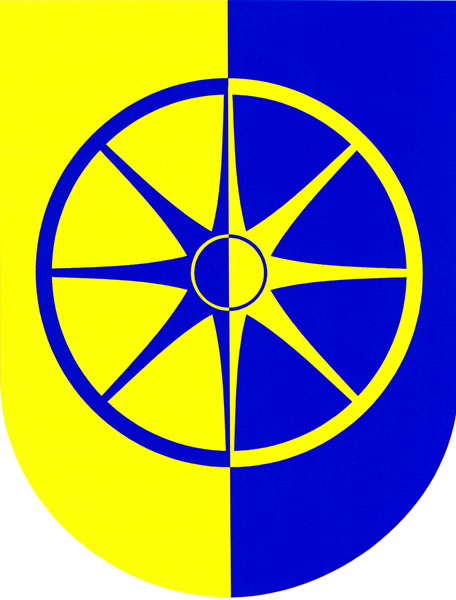
- Flag Coat of arms

- Location in the Czech Republic
- Coordinates: 49°23′38″N 16°38′42″E
- Country: Czech Republic
- Region: South Moravian
- District: Blansko
- First mentioned: 1554

Area
  - Total: 5.02 km^{2} (1.94 sq mi)
- Elevation: 268 m (879 ft)

Population (2026-01-01)
  - Total: 1,462
  - Density: 291/km^{2} (754/sq mi)
- Time zone: UTC+1 (CET)
  - Summer (DST): UTC+2 (CEST)
- Postal code: 679 02
- Website: www.rajecko.cz

Ráječko is a municipality and village in Blansko District in the South Moravian Region of the Czech Republic. It has about 1,500 inhabitants.

Ráječko lies approximately 4 kilometres (2 mi) north of Blansko, 22 km (14 mi) north of Brno, and 178 km (111 mi) south-east of Prague.

== Demographics ==
Historical population
Year	Pop.	±%
1869	459	—
1880	483	+5.2%
1890	557	+15.3%
1900	667	+19.7%
1910	781	+17.1%
1921	800	+2.4%
1930	1,059	+32.4%
1950	1,061	+0.2%
1961	1,062	+0.1%
1970	1,101	+3.7%
1980	1,081	−1.8%
1991	1,160	+7.3%
2001	1,213	+4.6%
2011	1,241	+2.3%
2021	1,335	+7.6%
Source: Censuses
