= Žernovník =

- Municipality
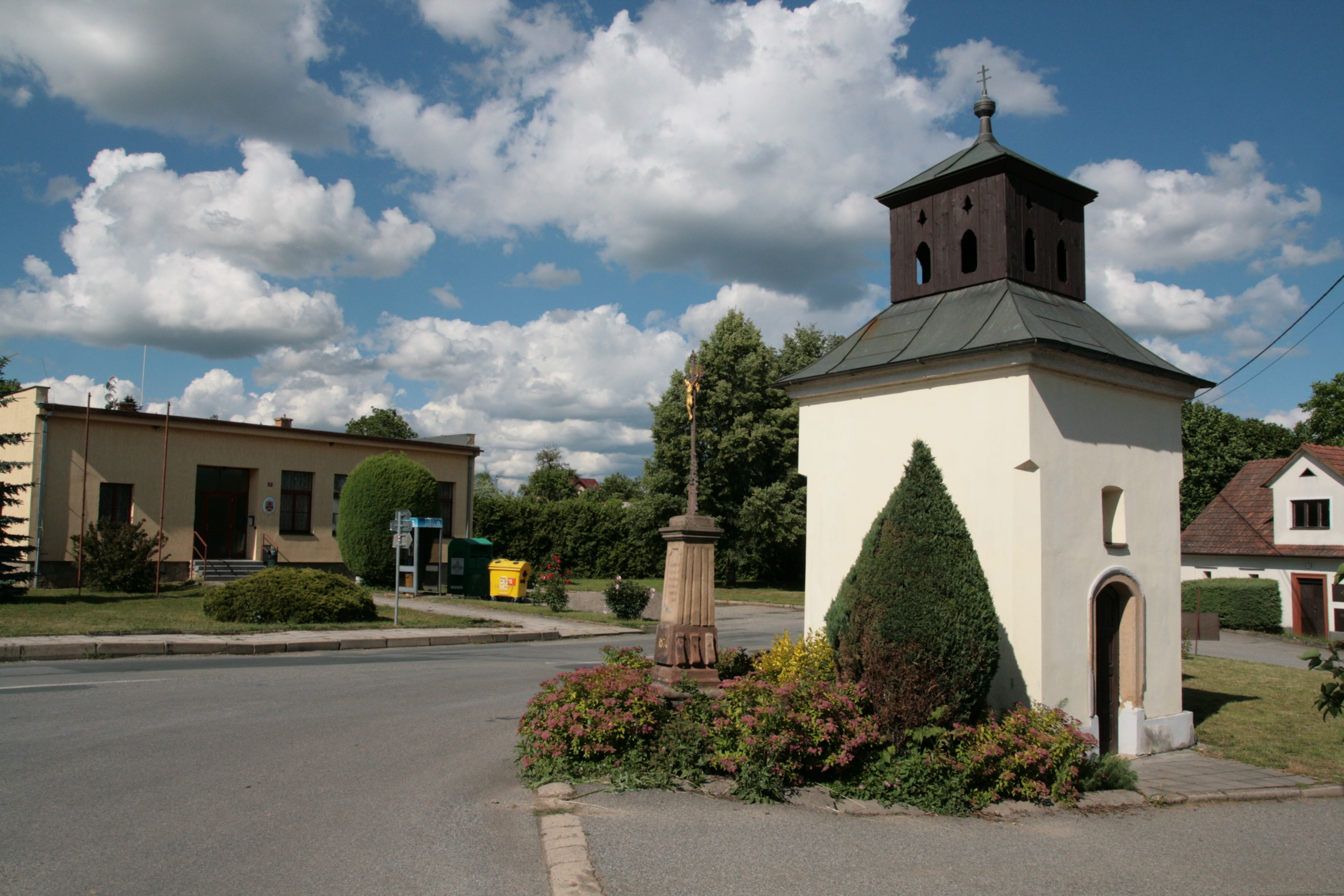
- Centre of Žernovník

- Flag Coat of arms

- Location in the Czech Republic
- Coordinates: 49°24′25″N 16°32′44″E
- Country: Czech Republic
- Region: South Moravian
- District: Blansko
- First mentioned: 1351

Area
  - Total: 2.87 km^{2} (1.11 sq mi)
- Elevation: 409 m (1,342 ft)

Population (2026-01-01)
  - Total: 269
  - Density: 93.7/km^{2} (243/sq mi)
- Time zone: UTC+1 (CET)
  - Summer (DST): UTC+2 (CEST)
- Postal code: 679 21
- Website: www.zernovnik.cz

Žernovník is a municipality and village in Blansko District in the South Moravian Region of the Czech Republic. It has about 300 inhabitants.

Žernovník lies approximately 9 kilometres (6 mi) north-west of Blansko, 24 km (15 mi) north of Brno, and 171 km (106 mi) south-east of Prague.

== Demographics ==
Historical population
| Year | Pop. | ±% |
|---|---|---|
| 1869 | 227 | — |
| 1880 | 249 | +9.7% |
| 1890 | 218 | −12.4% |
| 1900 | 224 | +2.8% |
| 1910 | 266 | +18.8% |
| 1921 | 283 | +6.4% |
| 1930 | 272 | −3.9% |
| 1950 | 217 | −20.2% |
| 1961 | 240 | +10.6% |
| 1970 | 227 | −5.4% |
| 1980 | 211 | −7.0% |
| 1991 | 203 | −3.8% |
| 2001 | 192 | −5.4% |
| 2011 | 223 | +16.1% |
| 2021 | 257 | +15.2% |
Source: Censuses
