= Dlouhá Lhota (Blansko District) =

- Municipality
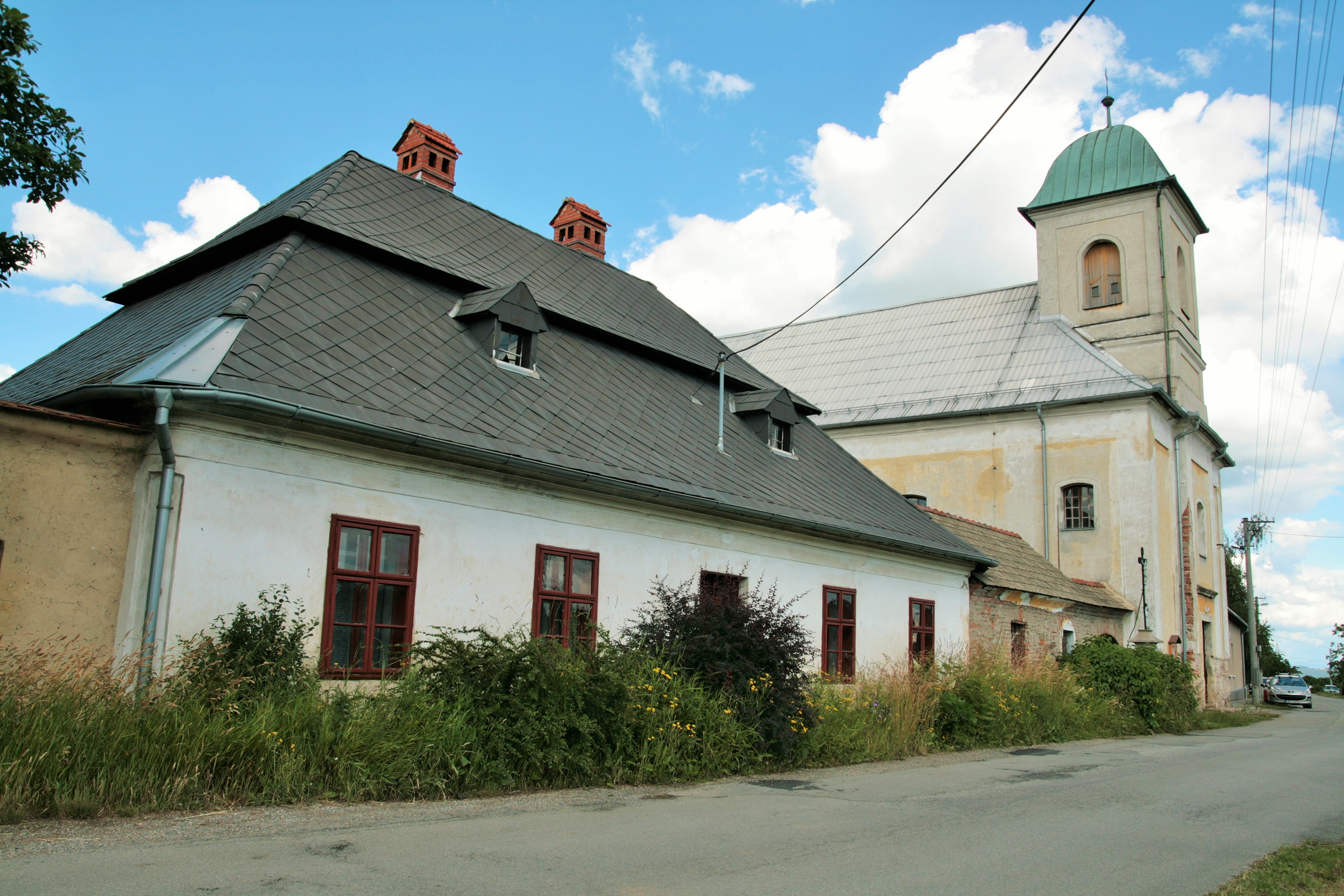
- Rectory and the Church of Saint Bartholomew

- Flag Coat of arms

- Location in the Czech Republic
- Coordinates: 49°25′43″N 16°30′35″E
- Country: Czech Republic
- Region: South Moravian
- District: Blansko
- First mentioned: 1365

Area
  - Total: 5.30 km^{2} (2.05 sq mi)
- Elevation: 470 m (1,540 ft)

Population (2026-01-01)
  - Total: 137
  - Density: 25.8/km^{2} (66.9/sq mi)
- Time zone: UTC+1 (CET)
  - Summer (DST): UTC+2 (CEST)
- Postal code: 679 71
- Website: www.dlhota.cz

Dlouhá Lhota is a municipality and village in Blansko District in the South Moravian Region of the Czech Republic. It has about 100 inhabitants.

Dlouhá Lhota lies approximately 13 kilometres (8 mi) north-west of Blansko, 27 km (17 mi) north of Brno, and 167 km (104 mi) south-east of Prague.

== Demographics ==
Historical population
Year	Pop.	±%
1869	229	—
1880	233	+1.7%
1890	216	−7.3%
1900	222	+2.8%
1910	219	−1.4%
1921	209	−4.6%
1930	221	+5.7%
1950	199	−10.0%
1961	201	+1.0%
1970	189	−6.0%
1980	156	−17.5%
1991	145	−7.1%
2001	117	−19.3%
2011	110	−6.0%
2021	141	+28.2%
Source: Censuses
