= Lipovec (Blansko District) =

- Municipality
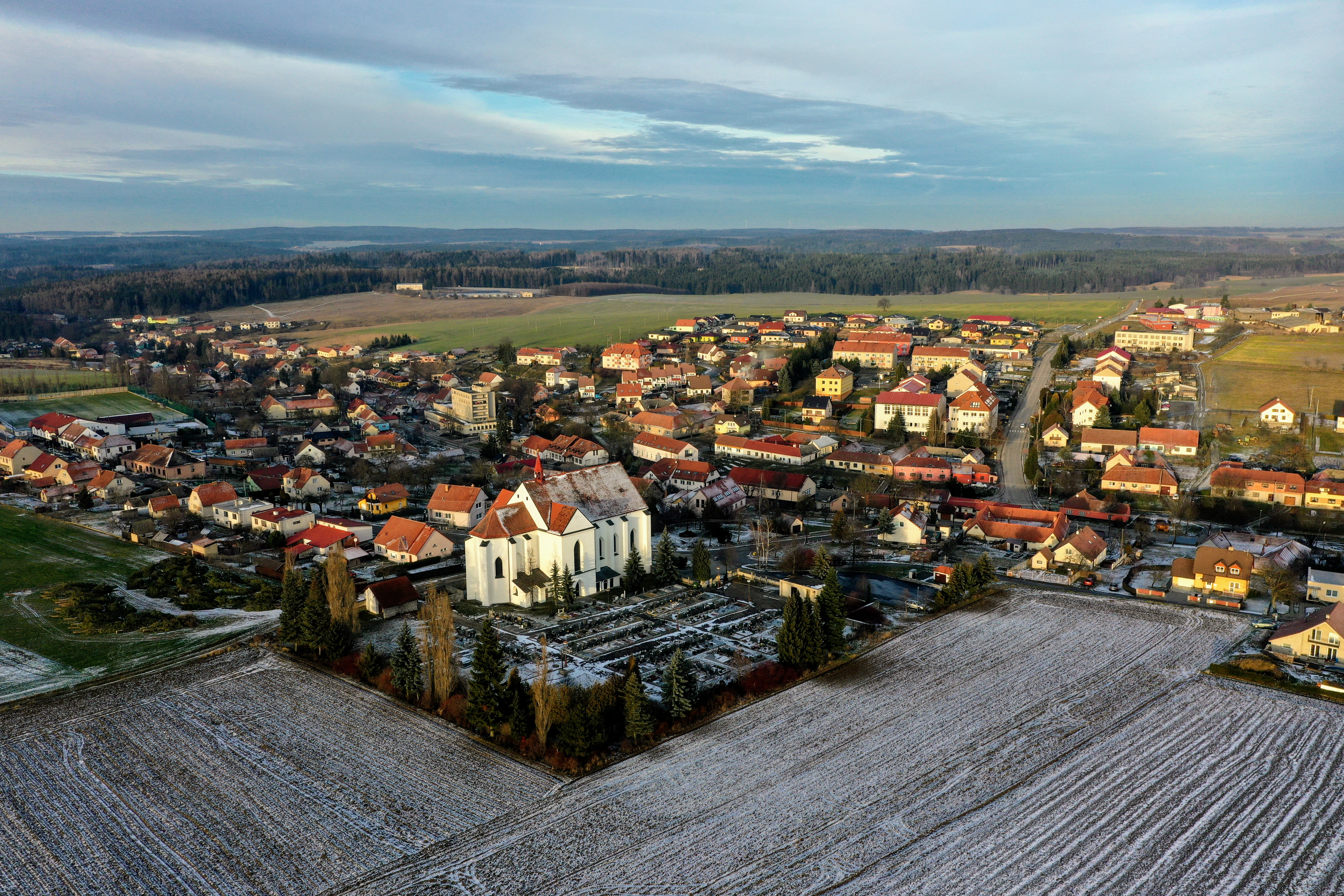
- Church of the Nativity of the Virgin Mary

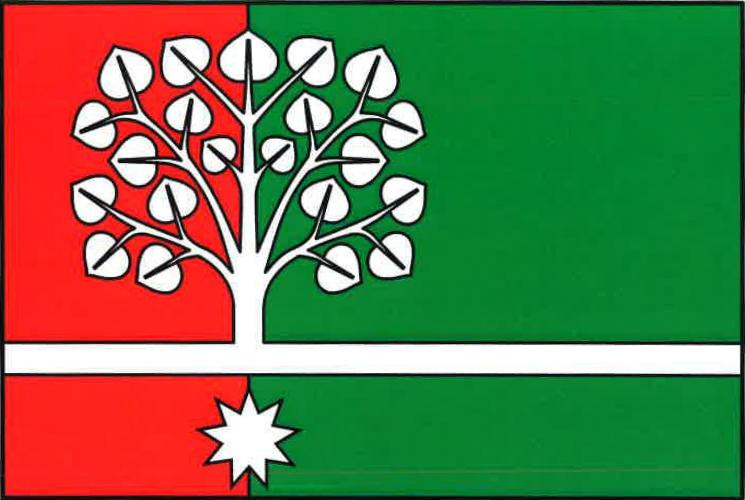
- Flag Coat of arms

- Location in the Czech Republic
- Coordinates: 49°21′18″N 16°47′4″E
- Country: Czech Republic
- Region: South Moravian
- District: Blansko
- First mentioned: 1349

Area
  - Total: 11.56 km^{2} (4.46 sq mi)
- Elevation: 555 m (1,821 ft)

Population (2026-01-01)
  - Total: 1,197
  - Density: 103.5/km^{2} (268.2/sq mi)
- Time zone: UTC+1 (CET)
  - Summer (DST): UTC+2 (CEST)
- Postal codes: 679 06, 679 15
- Website: www.lipovec.cz

Lipovec is a municipality and village in Blansko District in the South Moravian Region of the Czech Republic. It has about 1,200 inhabitants.

Lipovec lies approximately 12 kilometres (7 mi) east of Blansko, 26 km (16 mi) north-east of Brno, and 189 km (117 mi) south-east of Prague.

== Administrative division ==
Lipovec consists of two municipal parts (in brackets population according to the 2021 census):

- Lipovec (1,094)
- Marianín (51)

== Demographics ==
Historical population
Year	Pop.	±%
1869	1,183	—
1880	1,216	+2.8%
1890	1,239	+1.9%
1900	1,278	+3.1%
1910	1,349	+5.6%
1921	1,325	−1.8%
1930	1,210	−8.7%
1950	1,089	−10.0%
1961	1,127	+3.5%
1970	1,071	−5.0%
1980	1,058	−1.2%
1991	1,027	−2.9%
2001	1,028	+0.1%
2011	1,070	+4.1%
2021	1,145	+7.0%
Source: Censuses
