= Lubě =

- Municipality
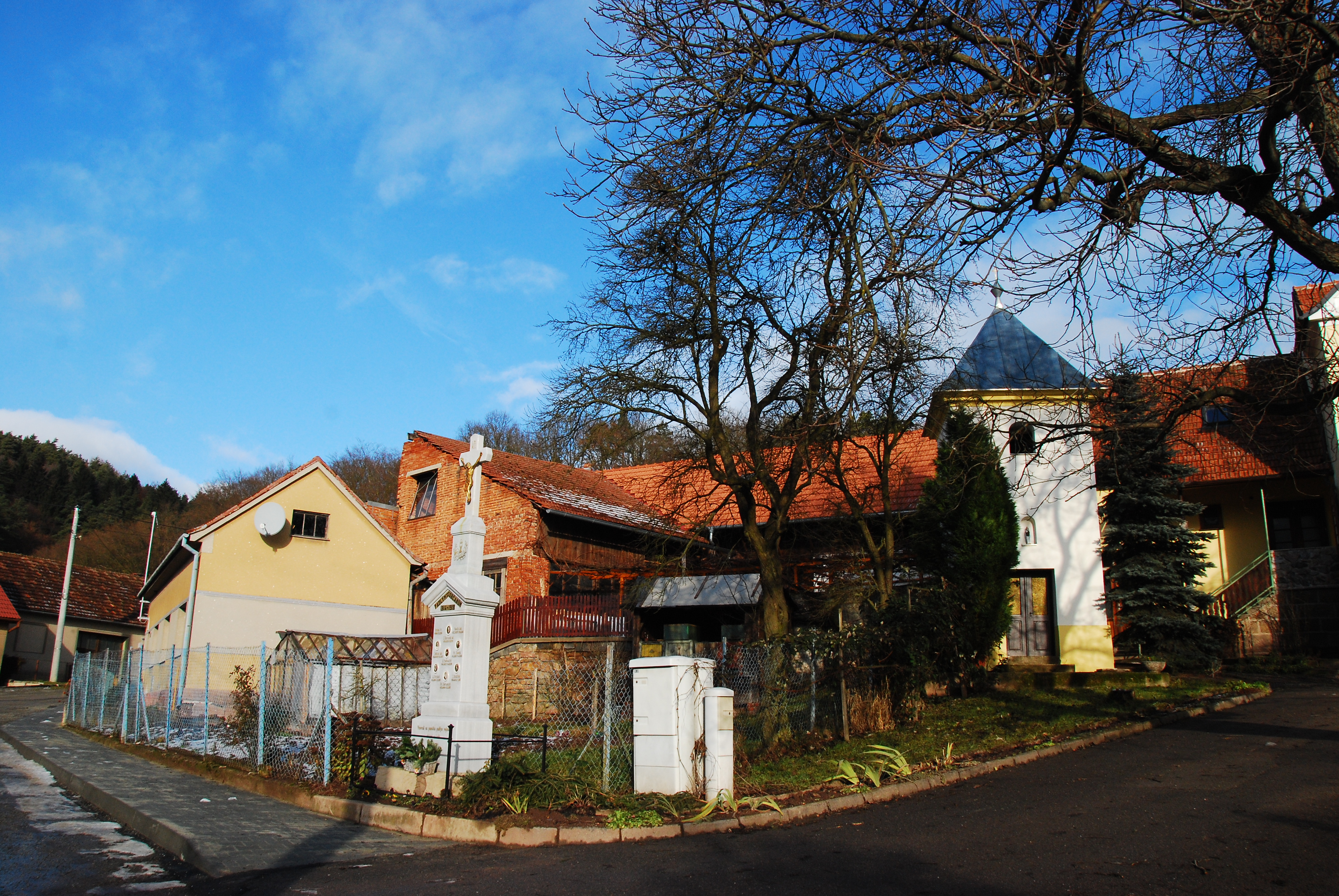
- Chapel of the Nativity of the Virgin Mary

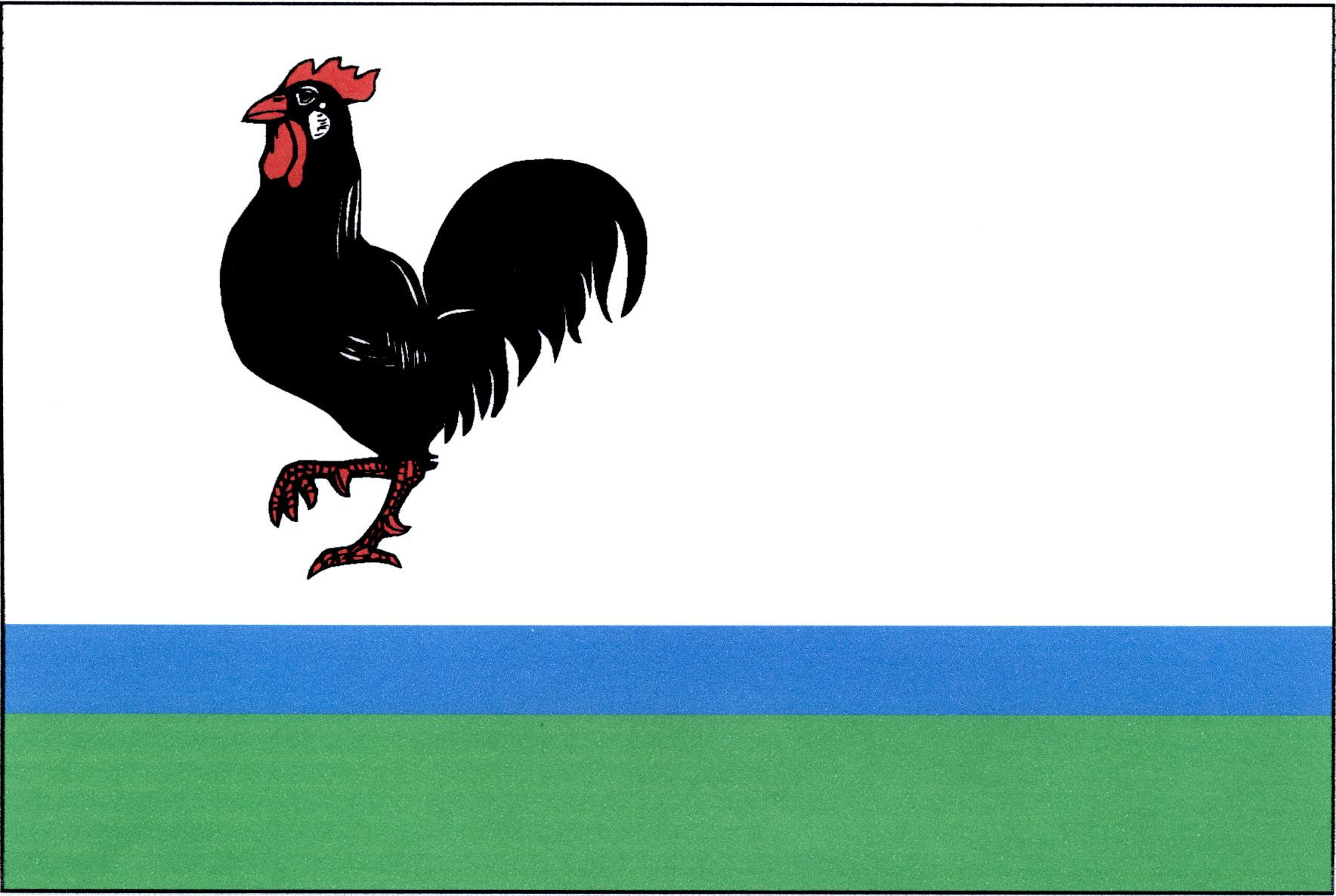
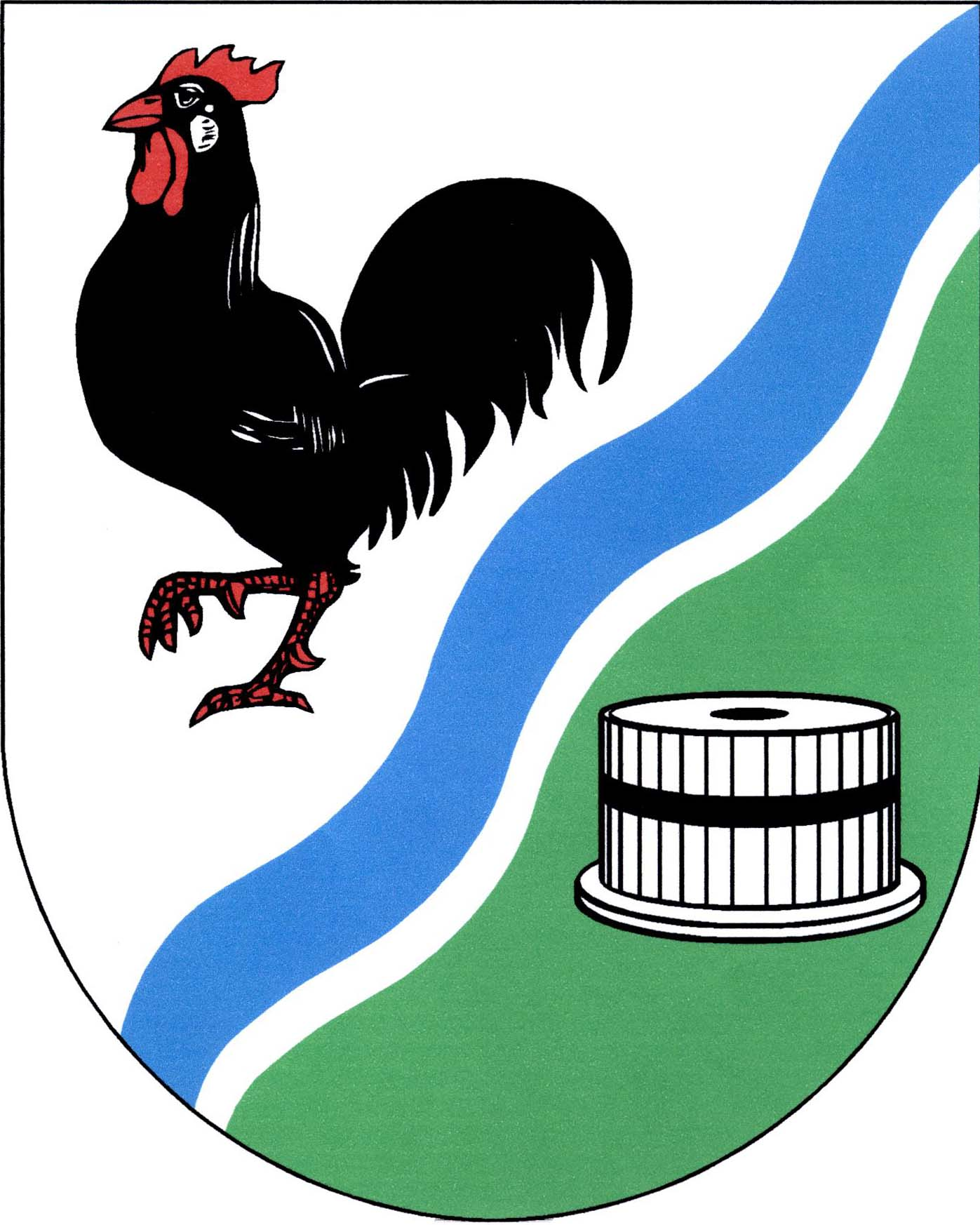
- Flag Coat of arms

- Location in the Czech Republic
- Coordinates: 49°23′46″N 16°31′34″E
- Country: Czech Republic
- Region: South Moravian
- District: Blansko
- First mentioned: 1360

Area
  - Total: 3.53 km^{2} (1.36 sq mi)
- Elevation: 369 m (1,211 ft)

Population (2026-01-01)
  - Total: 102
  - Density: 28.9/km^{2} (74.8/sq mi)
- Time zone: UTC+1 (CET)
  - Summer (DST): UTC+2 (CEST)
- Postal code: 679 21
- Website: obeclube.cz

Lubě is a municipality and village in Blansko District in the South Moravian Region of the Czech Republic. It has about 100 inhabitants.

Lubě lies approximately 10 kilometres (6 mi) west of Blansko, 23 km (14 mi) north of Brno, and 170 km (110 mi) south-east of Prague.

== Demographics ==
Historical population
Year	Pop.	±%
1869	155	—
1880	129	−16.8%
1890	159	+23.3%
1900	157	−1.3%
1910	175	+11.5%
1921	194	+10.9%
1930	181	−6.7%
1950	147	−18.8%
1961	160	+8.8%
1970	144	−10.0%
1980	119	−17.4%
1991	95	−20.2%
2001	105	+10.5%
2011	98	−6.7%
2021	96	−2.0%
Source: Censuses
