= Olomučany =

- Municipality
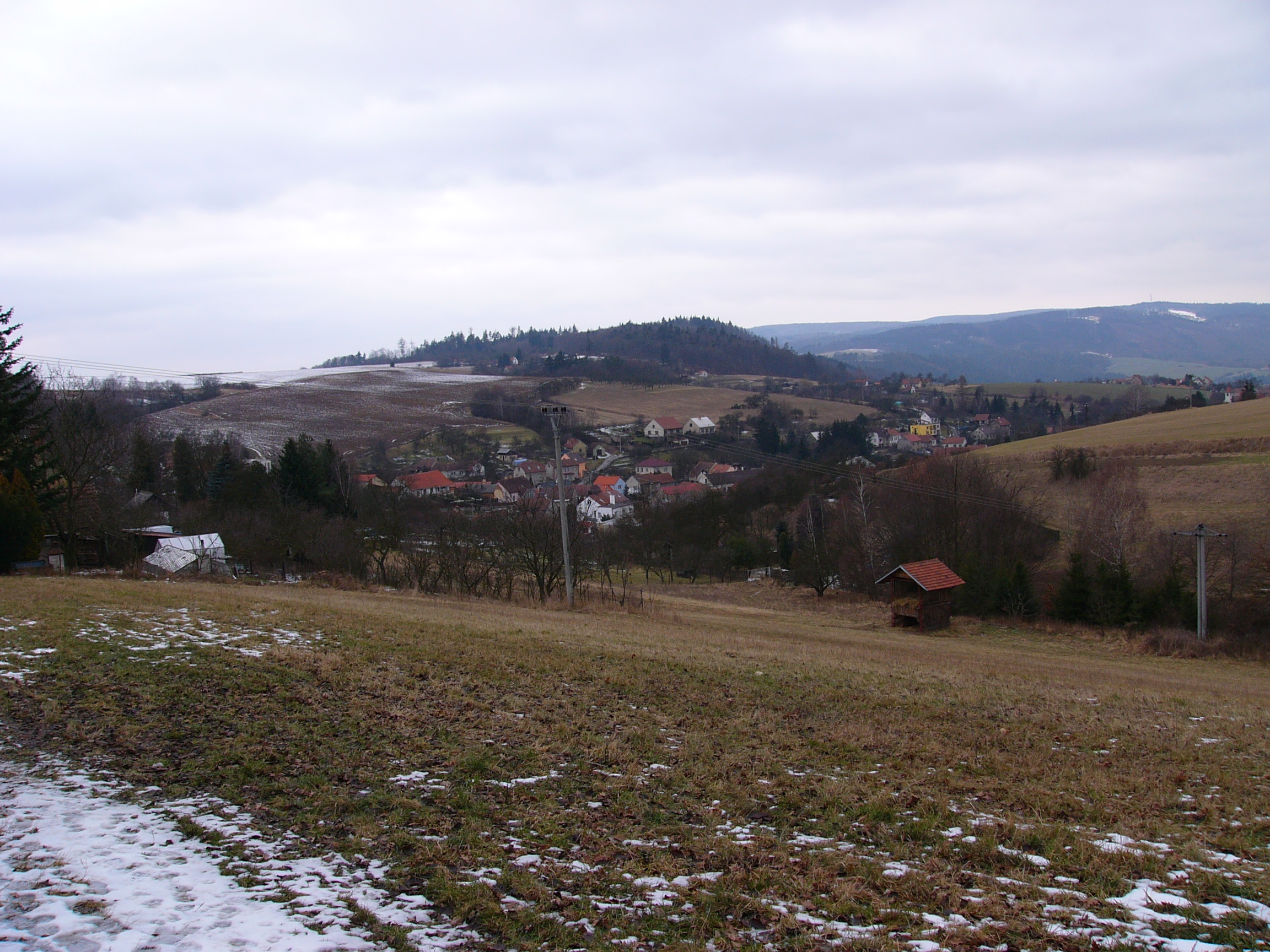
- General view

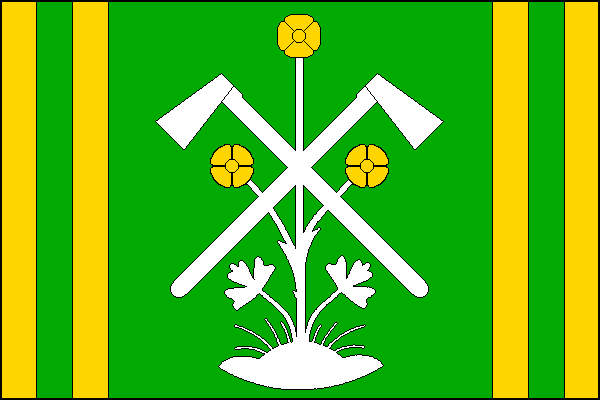
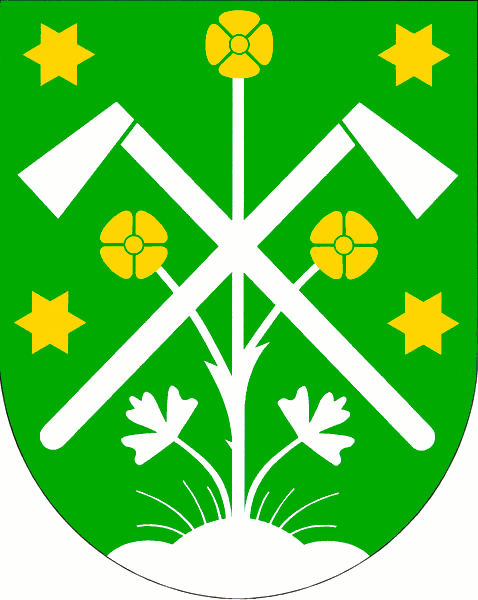
- Flag Coat of arms

- Location in the Czech Republic
- Coordinates: 49°19′51″N 16°40′18″E
- Country: Czech Republic
- Region: South Moravian
- District: Blansko
- First mentioned: 1346

Area
  - Total: 15.13 km^{2} (5.84 sq mi)
- Elevation: 358 m (1,175 ft)

Population (2026-01-01)
  - Total: 1,085
  - Density: 71.71/km^{2} (185.7/sq mi)
- Time zone: UTC+1 (CET)
  - Summer (DST): UTC+2 (CEST)
- Postal code: 679 03
- Website: www.olomucany.cz

Olomučany is a municipality and village in Blansko District in the South Moravian Region of the Czech Republic. It has about 1,100 inhabitants.

Olomučany lies approximately 5 kilometres (3 mi) south of Blansko, 16 km (10 mi) north of Brno, and 183 km (114 mi) south-east of Prague.

== Demographics ==
Historical population
Year	Pop.	±%
1869	1,064	—
1880	1,150	+8.1%
1890	1,244	+8.2%
1900	1,425	+14.5%
1910	1,455	+2.1%
1921	1,439	−1.1%
1930	1,286	−10.6%
1950	1,155	−10.2%
1961	1,025	−11.3%
1970	1,015	−1.0%
1980	941	−7.3%
1991	882	−6.3%
2001	890	+0.9%
2011	946	+6.3%
2021	1,050	+11.0%
Source: Censuses
