= Milonice (Blansko District) =

- Municipality
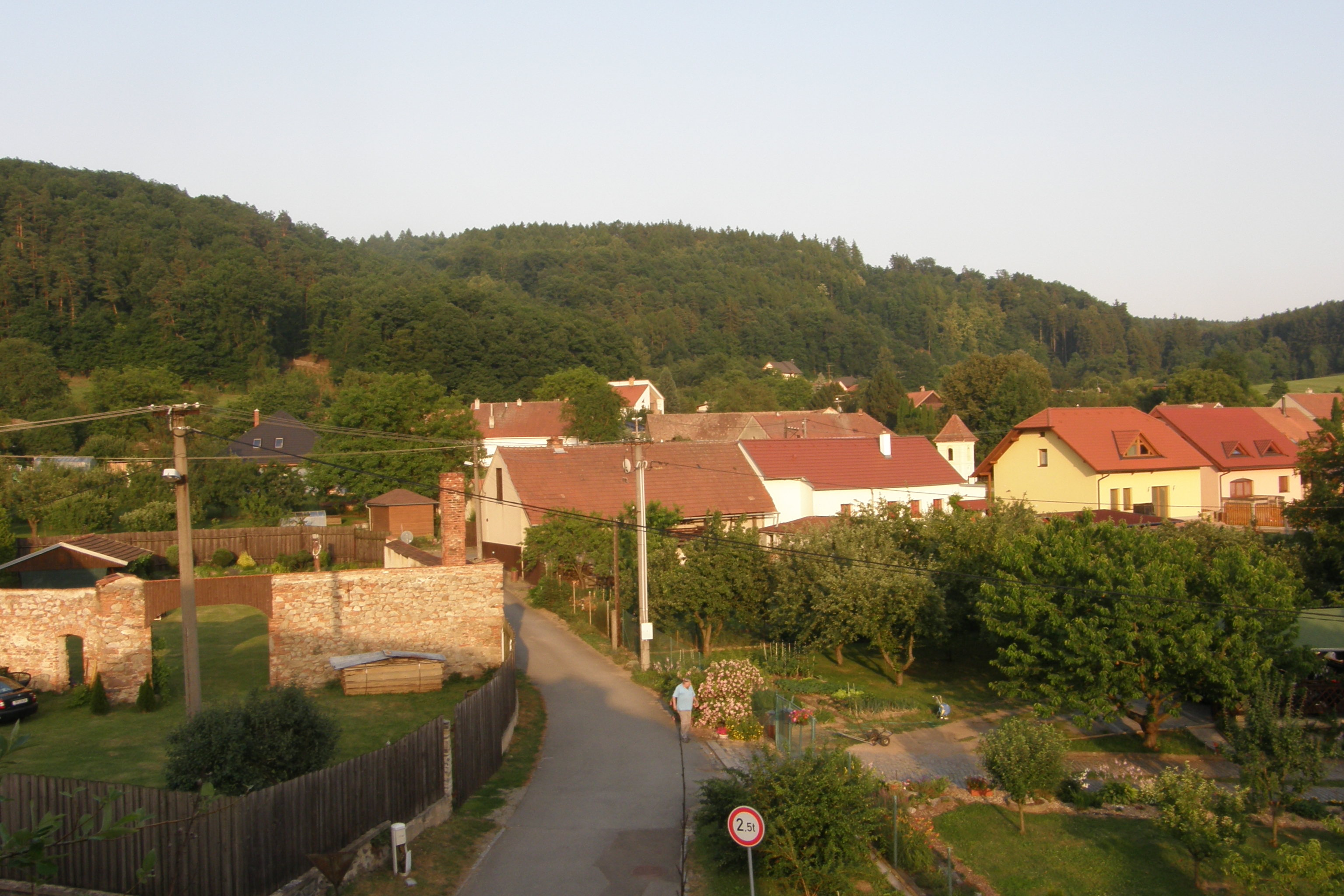
- General view

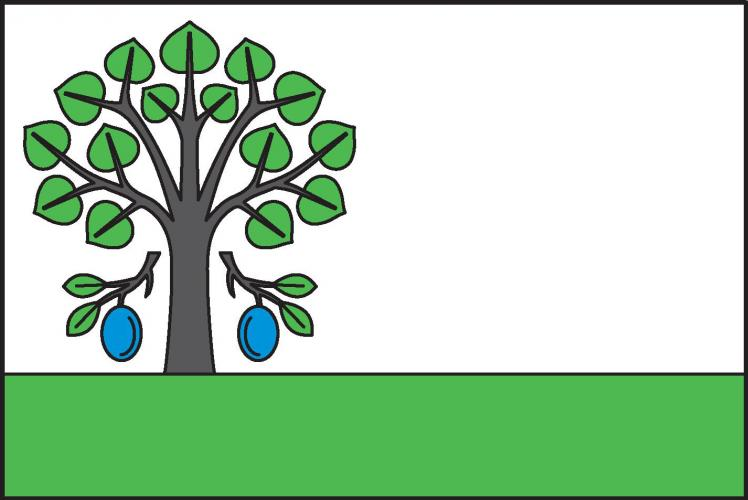
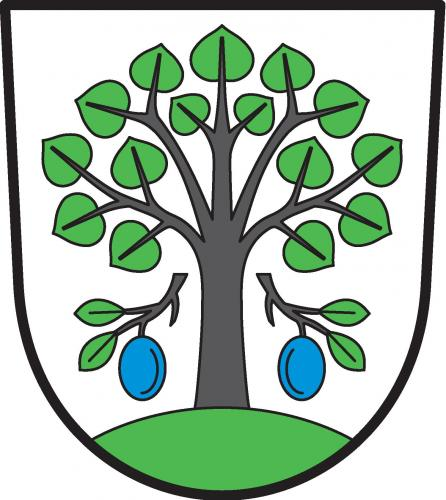
- Flag Coat of arms

- Location in the Czech Republic
- Coordinates: 49°21′59″N 16°34′6″E
- Country: Czech Republic
- Region: South Moravian
- District: Blansko
- First mentioned: 1358

Area
  - Total: 2.59 km^{2} (1.00 sq mi)
- Elevation: 365 m (1,198 ft)

Population (2026-01-01)
  - Total: 162
  - Density: 62.5/km^{2} (162/sq mi)
- Time zone: UTC+1 (CET)
  - Summer (DST): UTC+2 (CEST)
- Postal code: 679 22
- Website: www.obecmilonice.cz

Milonice is a municipality and village in Blansko District in the South Moravian Region of the Czech Republic. It has about 200 inhabitants.

Milonice lies approximately 7 kilometres (4 mi) west of Blansko, 20 km (12 mi) north of Brno, and 174 km (108 mi) south-east of Prague.

== Demographics ==
Historical population
Year	Pop.	±%
1869	126	—
1880	132	+4.8%
1890	170	+28.8%
1900	202	+18.8%
1910	188	−6.9%
1921	198	+5.3%
1930	215	+8.6%
1950	165	−23.3%
1961	202	+22.4%
1970	184	−8.9%
1980	189	+2.7%
1991	168	−11.1%
2001	176	+4.8%
2011	190	+8.0%
2021	170	−10.5%
Source: Censuses
