= Kuničky =

- Municipality
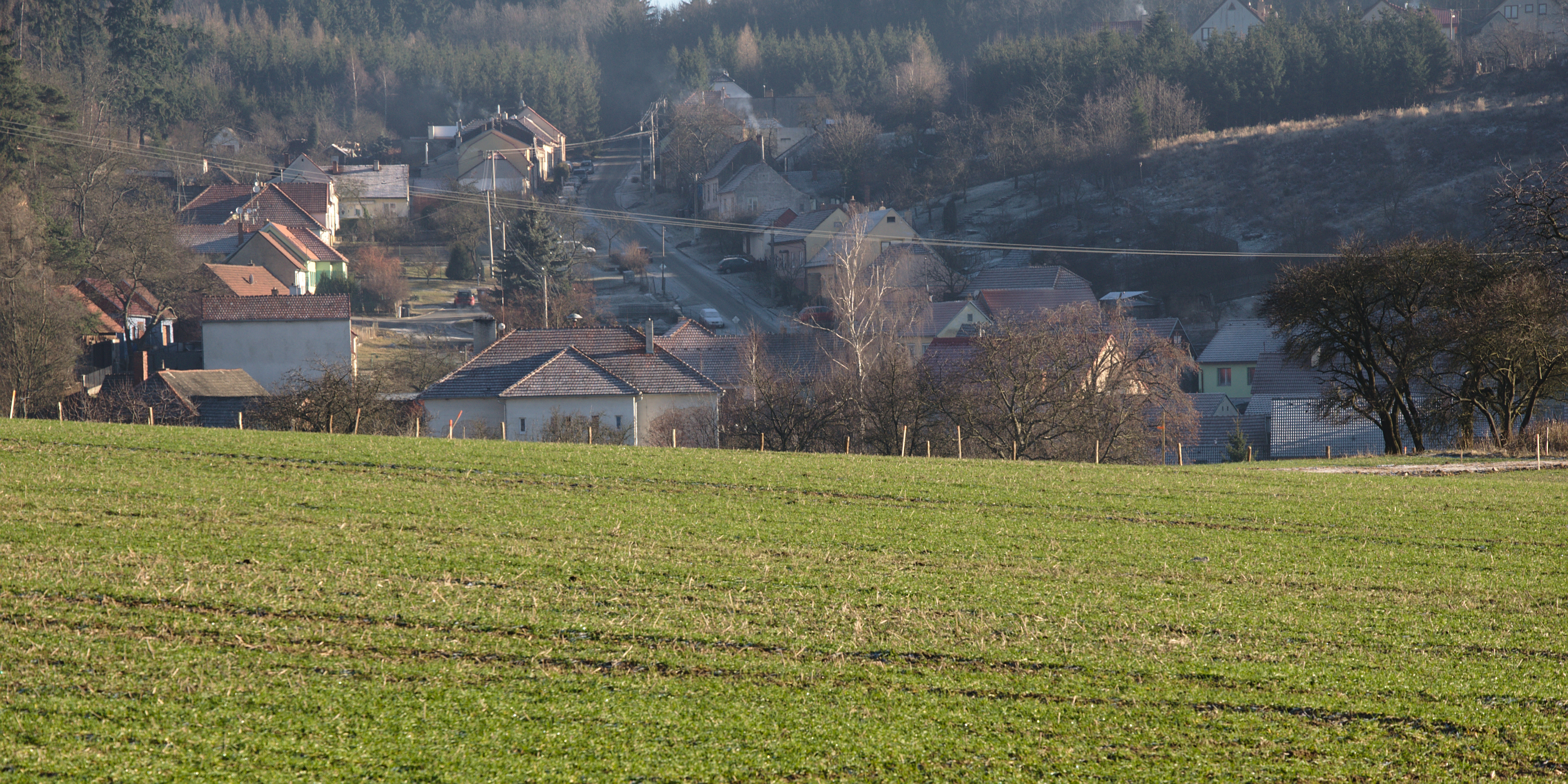
- View from the west

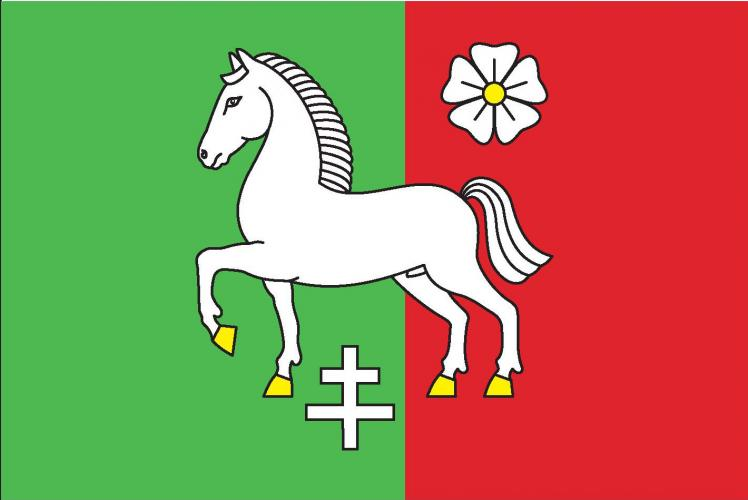
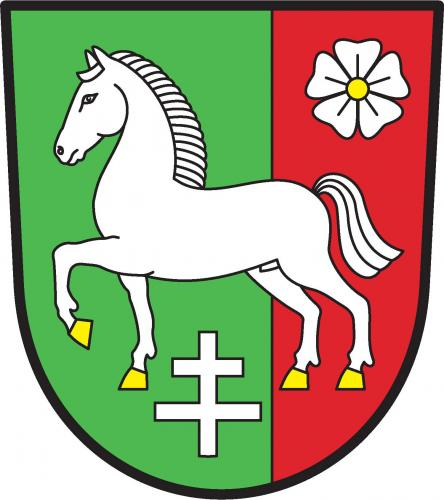
- Flag Coat of arms

- Location in the Czech Republic
- Coordinates: 49°26′6″N 16°40′53″E
- Country: Czech Republic
- Region: South Moravian
- District: Blansko
- First mentioned: 1378

Area
  - Total: 4.29 km^{2} (1.66 sq mi)
- Elevation: 530 m (1,740 ft)

Population (2026-01-01)
  - Total: 261
  - Density: 60.8/km^{2} (158/sq mi)
- Time zone: UTC+1 (CET)
  - Summer (DST): UTC+2 (CEST)
- Postal code: 679 02
- Website: www.kunicky.cz

Kuničky is a municipality and village in Blansko District in the South Moravian Region of the Czech Republic. It has about 300 inhabitants.

Kuničky lies approximately 8 kilometres (5 mi) north of Blansko, 27 km (17 mi) north of Brno, and 179 km (111 mi) south-east of Prague.

== Demographics ==
Historical population
Year	Pop.	±%
1869	245	—
1880	245	+0.0%
1890	298	+21.6%
1900	344	+15.4%
1910	358	+4.1%
1921	345	−3.6%
1930	417	+20.9%
1950	347	−16.8%
1961	354	+2.0%
1970	364	+2.8%
1980	318	−12.6%
1991	279	−12.3%
2001	267	−4.3%
2011	272	+1.9%
2021	280	+2.9%
Source: Censuses
