= Brťov-Jeneč =

- Municipality
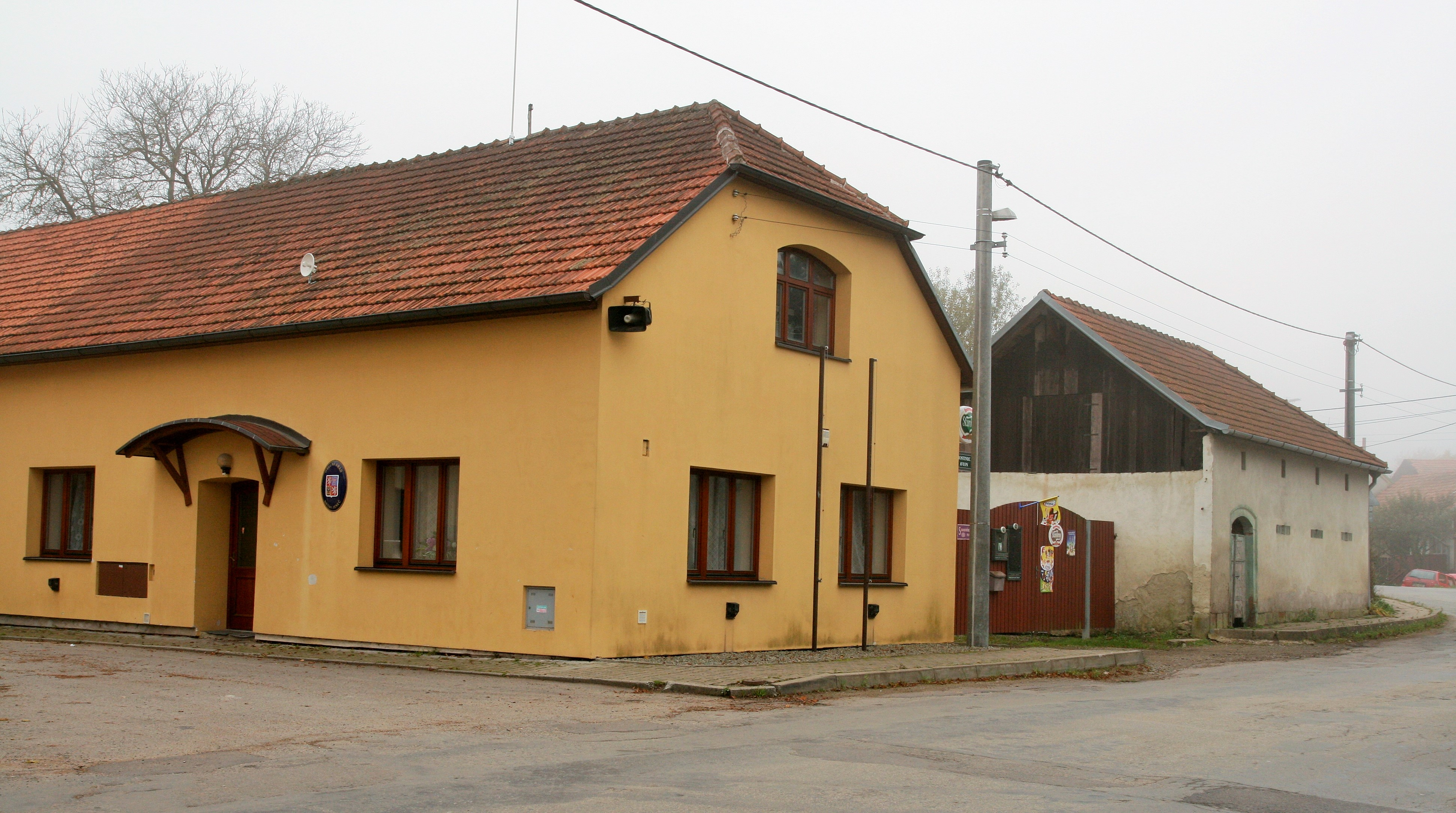
- Municipal office

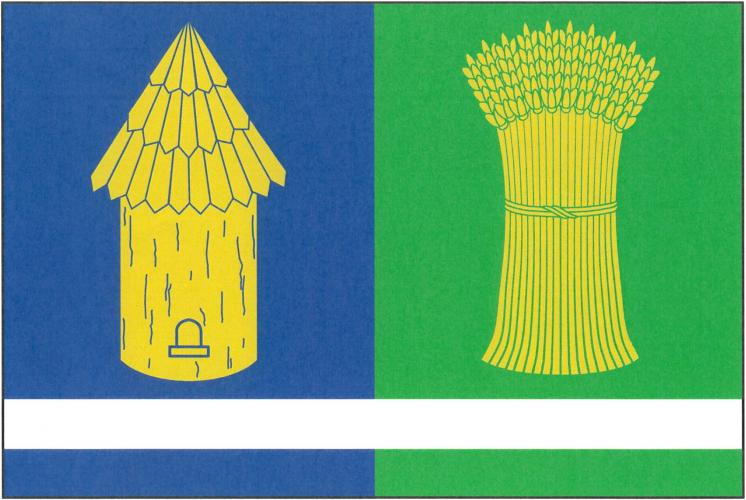
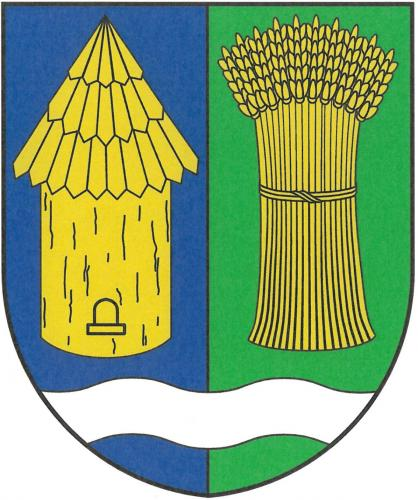
- Flag Coat of arms

- Location in the Czech Republic
- Coordinates: 49°24′51″N 16°30′58″E
- Country: Czech Republic
- Region: South Moravian
- District: Blansko
- First mentioned: 1276

Area
  - Total: 7.45 km^{2} (2.88 sq mi)
- Elevation: 437 m (1,434 ft)

Population (2026-01-01)
  - Total: 349
  - Density: 46.8/km^{2} (121/sq mi)
- Time zone: UTC+1 (CET)
  - Summer (DST): UTC+2 (CEST)
- Postal code: 679 21
- Website: www.brtov-jenec.cz

Brťov-Jeneč is a municipality in Blansko District in the South Moravian Region of the Czech Republic. It has about 300 inhabitants.

Brťov-Jeneč lies approximately 12 kilometres (7 mi) north-west of Blansko, 26 km (16 mi) north of Brno, and 168 km (104 mi) south-east of Prague.

== Administrative division ==
Brťov-Jeneč consists of two municipal parts (in brackets population according to the 2021 census):

- Brťov u Černé Hory (265)
- Jeneč (76)

== Demographics ==
Historical population
Year	Pop.	±%
1869	449	—
1880	454	+1.1%
1890	441	−2.9%
1900	462	+4.8%
1910	509	+10.2%
1921	470	−7.7%
1930	487	+3.6%
1950	453	−7.0%
1961	466	+2.9%
1970	413	−11.4%
1980	380	−8.0%
1991	391	+2.9%
2001	360	−7.9%
2011	357	−0.8%
2021	341	−4.5%
Source: Censuses
