= Lažany (Blansko District) =

- Municipality
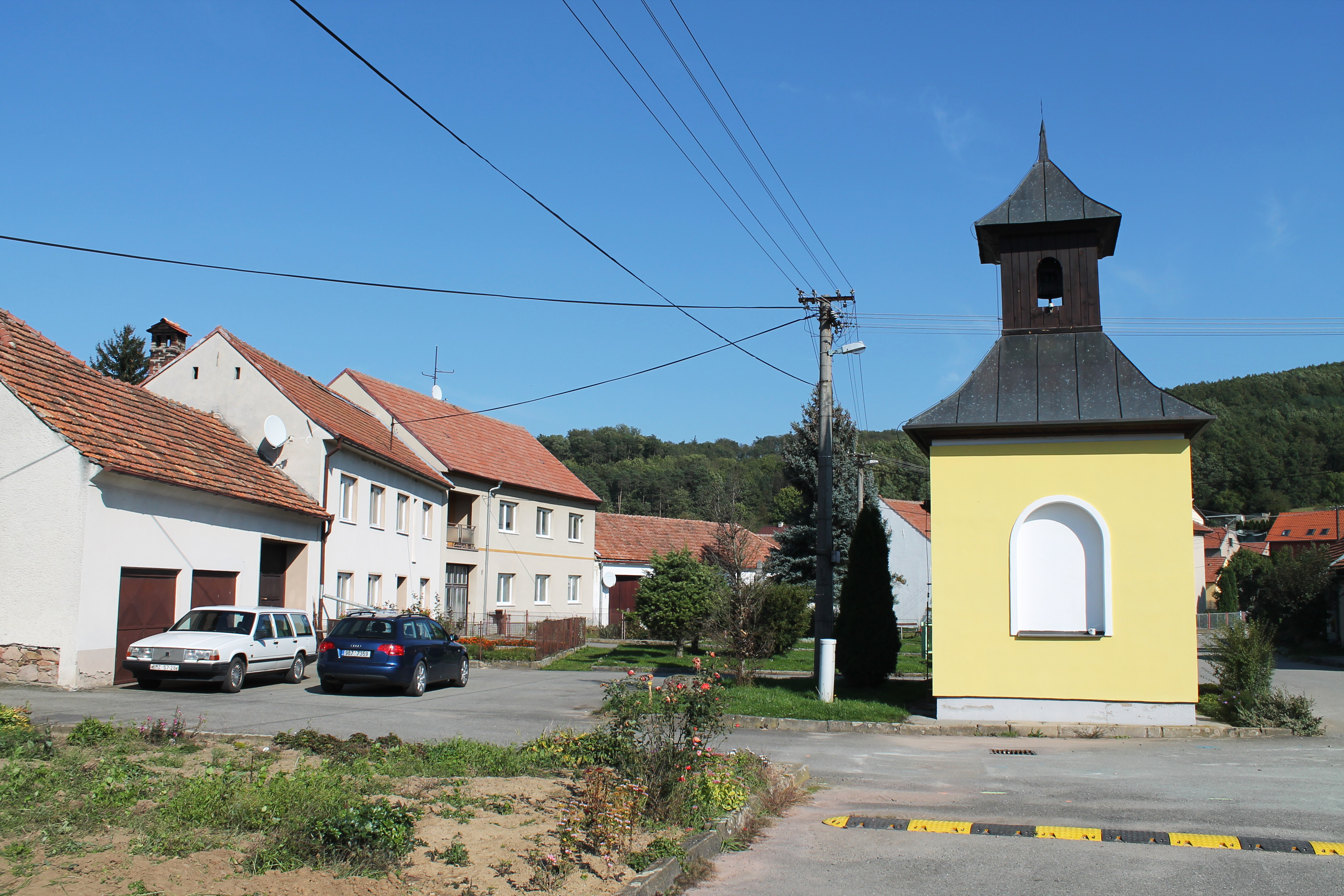
- Centre of Lažany

- Flag Coat of arms

- Location in the Czech Republic
- Coordinates: 49°21′16″N 16°33′0″E
- Country: Czech Republic
- Region: South Moravian
- District: Blansko
- First mentioned: 1353

Area
  - Total: 2.60 km^{2} (1.00 sq mi)
- Elevation: 324 m (1,063 ft)

Population (2026-01-01)
  - Total: 479
  - Density: 184/km^{2} (477/sq mi)
- Time zone: UTC+1 (CET)
  - Summer (DST): UTC+2 (CEST)
- Postal code: 679 22
- Website: www.obeclazany.eu

Lažany is a municipality and village in Blansko District in the South Moravian Region of the Czech Republic. It has about 500 inhabitants.

Lažany lies approximately 8 kilometres (5 mi) west of Blansko, 19 km (12 mi) north of Brno, and 174 km (108 mi) southeast of Prague.

== Demographics ==
Historical population
| Year | Pop. | ±% |
|---|---|---|
| 1869 | 278 | — |
| 1880 | 272 | −2.2% |
| 1890 | 291 | +7.0% |
| 1900 | 329 | +13.1% |
| 1910 | 411 | +24.9% |
| 1921 | 414 | +0.7% |
| 1930 | 409 | −1.2% |
| 1950 | 342 | −16.4% |
| 1961 | 388 | +13.5% |
| 1970 | 405 | +4.4% |
| 1980 | 350 | −13.6% |
| 1991 | 350 | +0.0% |
| 2001 | 346 | −1.1% |
| 2011 | 388 | +12.1% |
| 2021 | 421 | +8.5% |
Source: Censuses
