= Bukovina (Blansko District) =

- Municipality
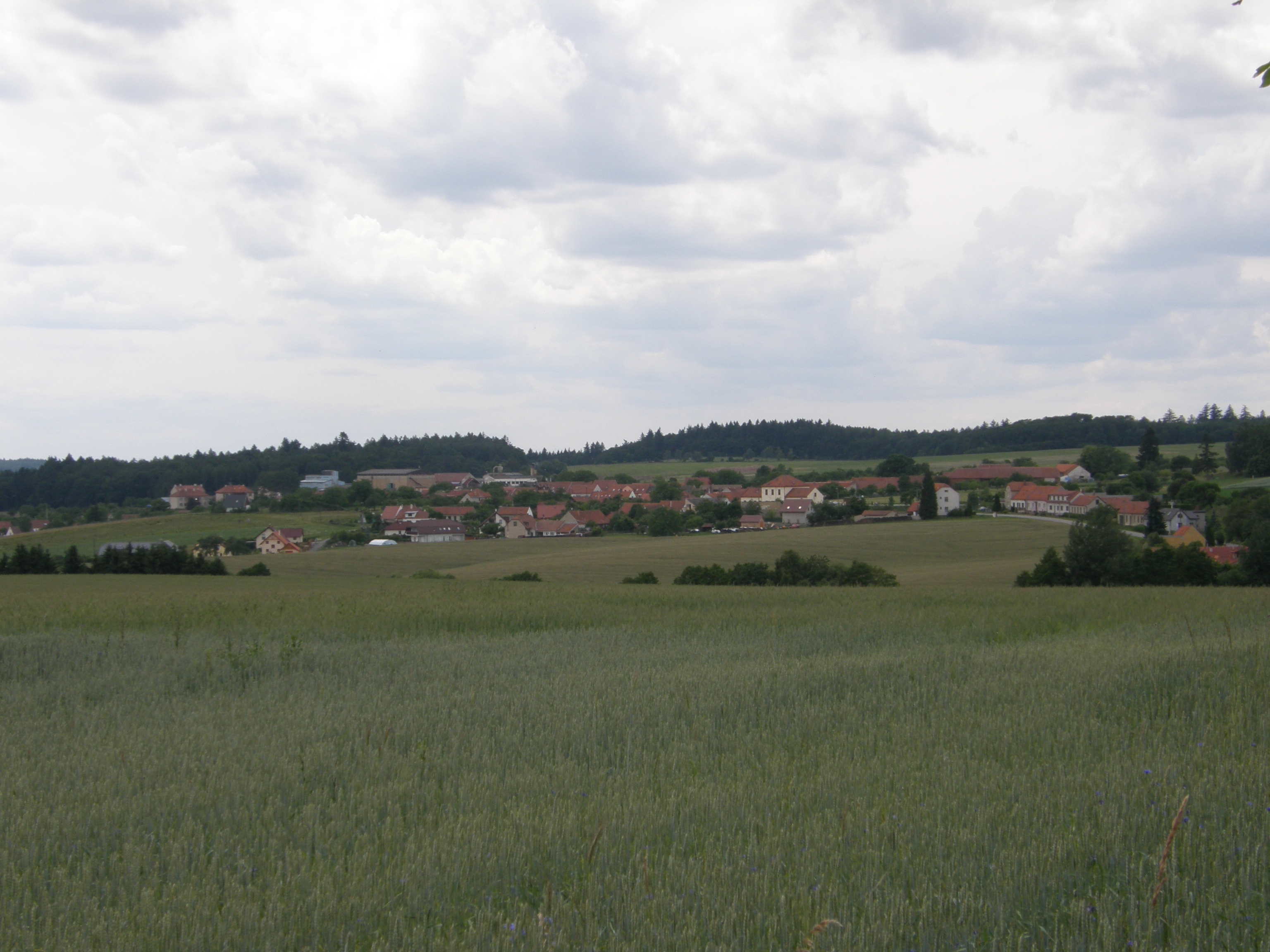
- General view

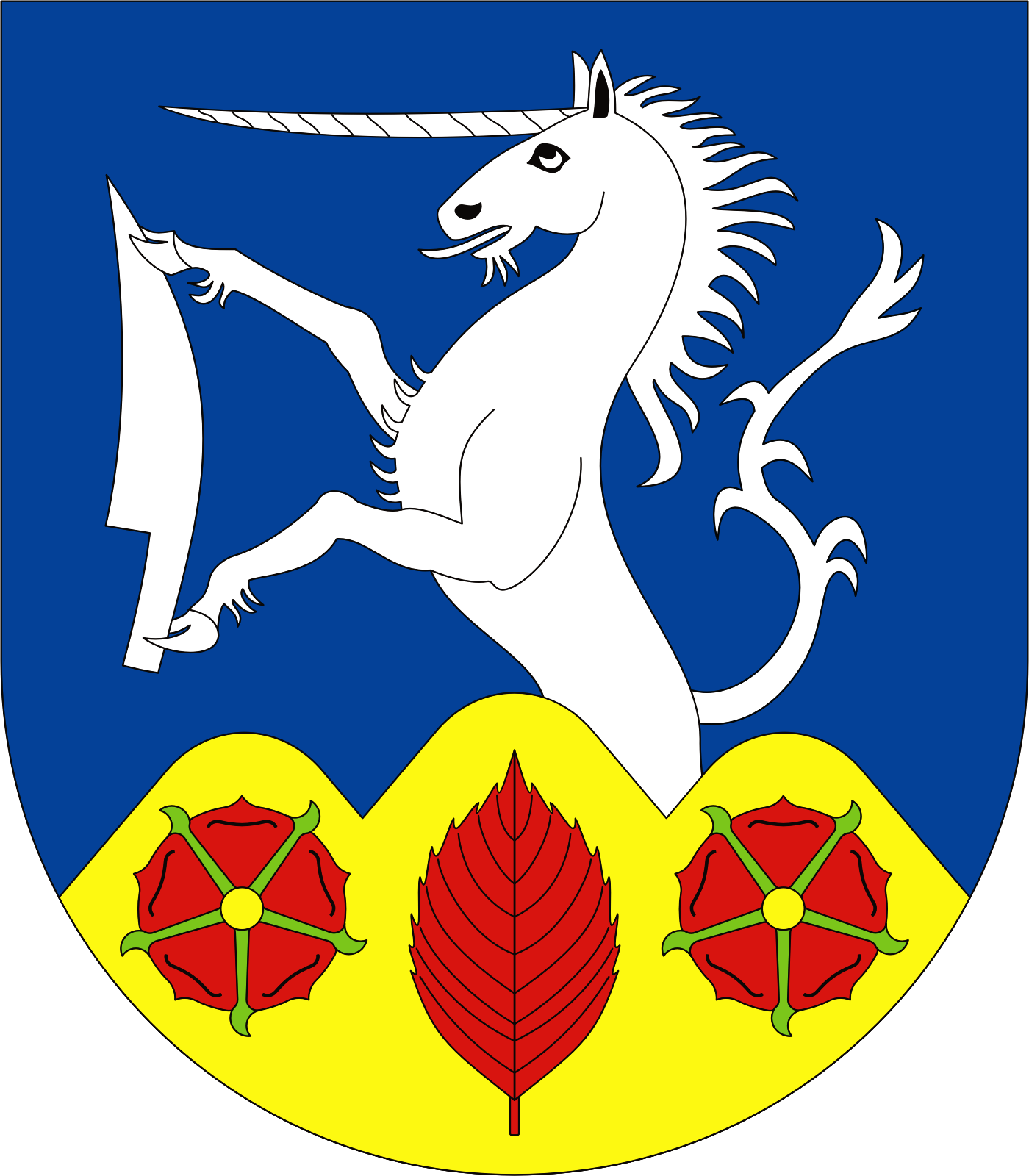
- Flag Coat of arms

- Location in the Czech Republic
- Coordinates: 49°17′51″N 16°46′23″E
- Country: Czech Republic
- Region: South Moravian
- District: Blansko
- First mentioned: 1283

Area
  - Total: 2.73 km^{2} (1.05 sq mi)
- Elevation: 497 m (1,631 ft)

Population (2026-01-01)
  - Total: 474
  - Density: 174/km^{2} (450/sq mi)
- Time zone: UTC+1 (CET)
  - Summer (DST): UTC+2 (CEST)
- Postal code: 679 05
- Website: www.obecbukovina.cz

Bukovina is a municipality and village in Blansko District in the South Moravian Region of the Czech Republic. It has about 500 inhabitants.

Bukovina lies approximately 12 kilometres (7 mi) south-east of Blansko, 17 km (11 mi) north-east of Brno, and 191 km (119 mi) south-east of Prague.

== Demographics ==
Historical population
Year	Pop.	±%
1869	423	—
1880	422	−0.2%
1890	439	+4.0%
1900	457	+4.1%
1910	490	+7.2%
1921	455	−7.1%
1930	393	−13.6%
1950	333	−15.3%
1961	330	−0.9%
1970	323	−2.1%
1980	332	+2.8%
1991	322	−3.0%
2001	322	+0.0%
2011	353	+9.6%
2021	466	+32.0%
Source: Censuses
