= Vavřinec (Blansko District) =

- Municipality
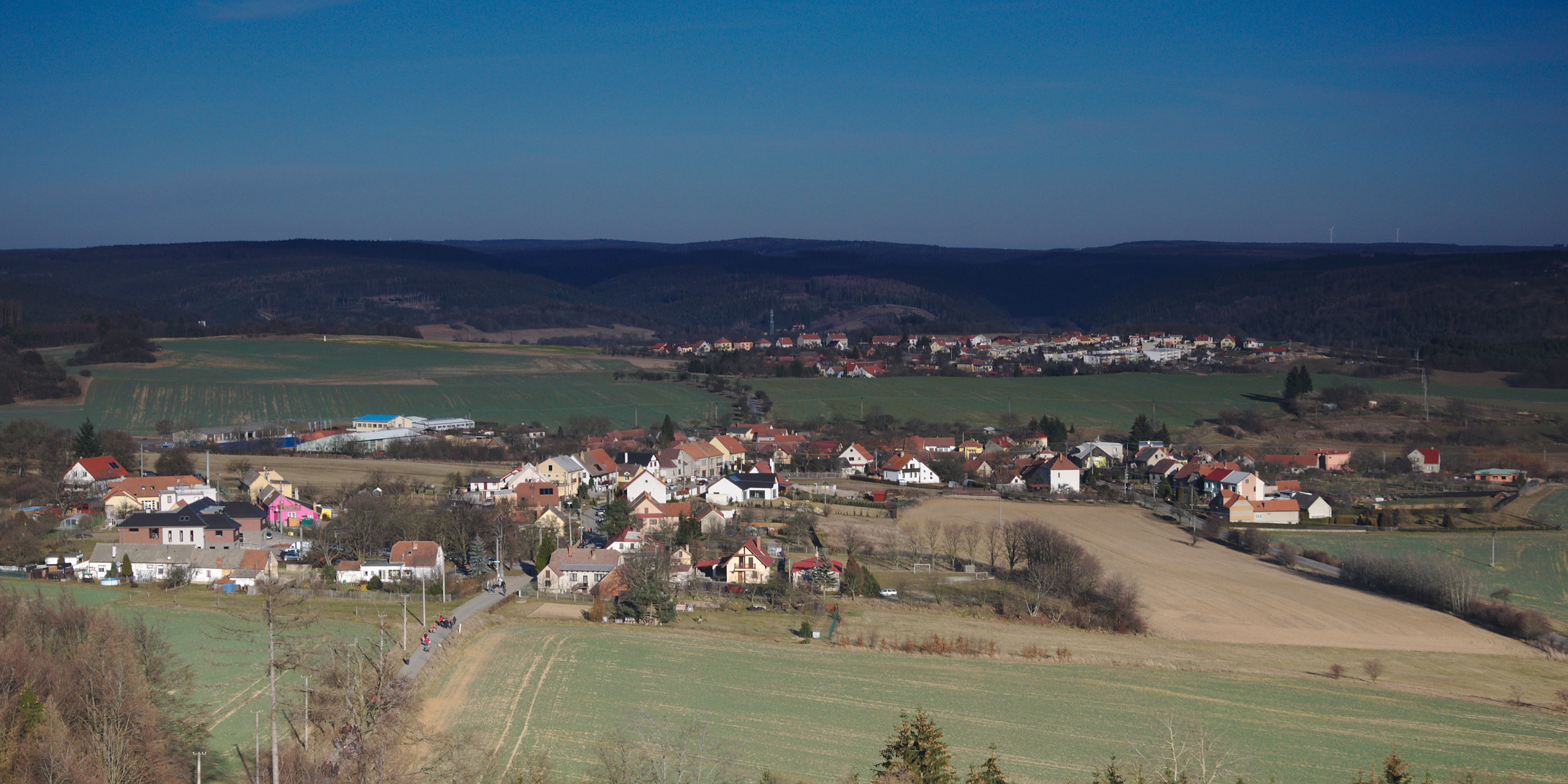
- Villages of Veselice and Vavřinec

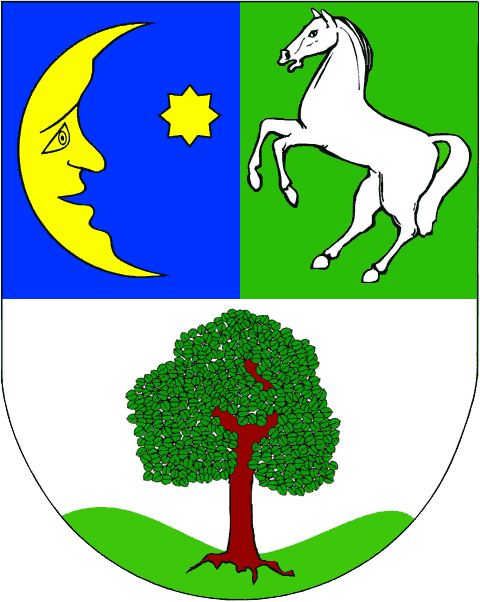
- Flag Coat of arms

- Location in the Czech Republic
- Coordinates: 49°24′9″N 16°43′12″E
- Country: Czech Republic
- Region: South Moravian
- District: Blansko
- First mentioned: 1374

Area
  - Total: 12.20 km^{2} (4.71 sq mi)
- Elevation: 545 m (1,788 ft)

Population (2026-01-01)
  - Total: 916
  - Density: 75.1/km^{2} (194/sq mi)
- Time zone: UTC+1 (CET)
  - Summer (DST): UTC+2 (CEST)
- Postal code: 679 13
- Website: www.vavrinec.cz

Vavřinec is a municipality and village in Blansko District in the South Moravian Region of the Czech Republic. It has about 900 inhabitants.

Vavřinec lies approximately 7 kilometres (4 mi) north-east of Blansko, 24 km (15 mi) north of Brno, and 182 km (113 mi) south-east of Prague.

== Administrative division ==
Vavřinec consists of five municipal parts (in brackets population according to the 2021 census):

- Vavřinec (390)
- Nové Dvory (40)
- Punkevní žleb (5)
- Suchdol (135)
- Veselice (274)

== Demographics ==
Historical population
Year	Pop.	±%
1869	706	—
1880	833	+18.0%
1890	928	+11.4%
1900	983	+5.9%
1910	1,005	+2.2%
1921	998	−0.7%
1930	993	−0.5%
1950	917	−7.7%
1961	877	−4.4%
1970	870	−0.8%
1980	892	+2.5%
1991	797	−10.7%
2001	822	+3.1%
2011	822	+0.0%
2021	844	+2.7%
Source: Censuses
