= Vysočany (Blansko District) =

- Municipality
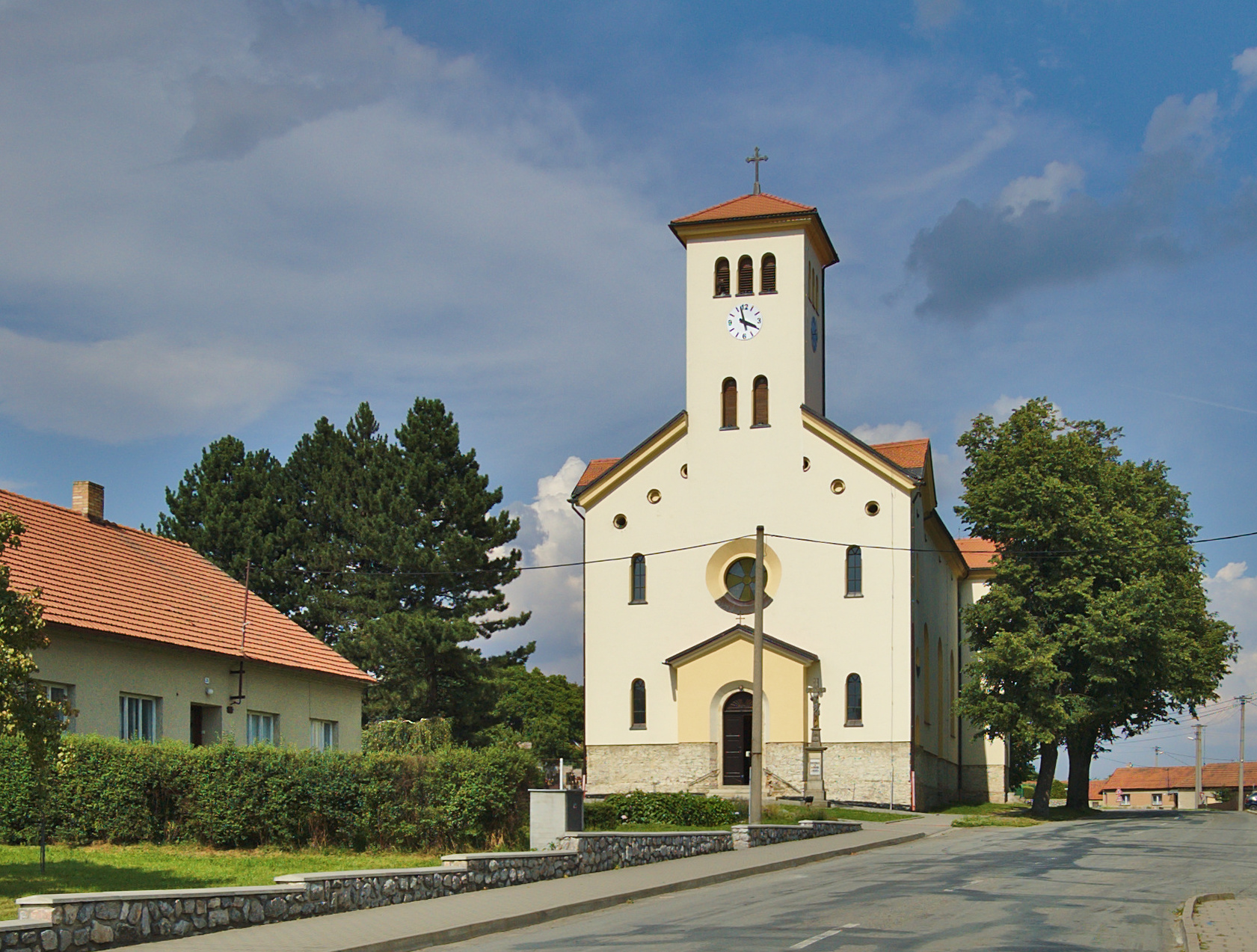
- Church of Saints Cyril and Methodius

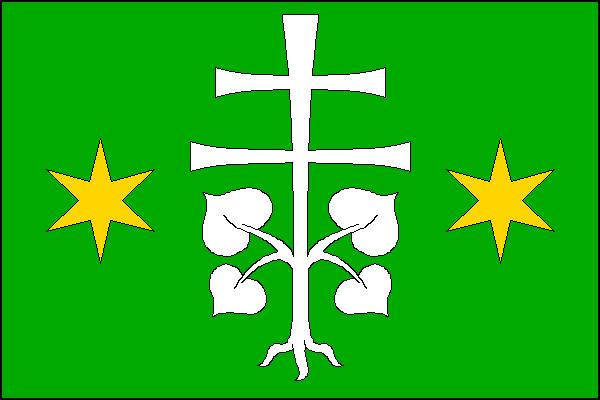
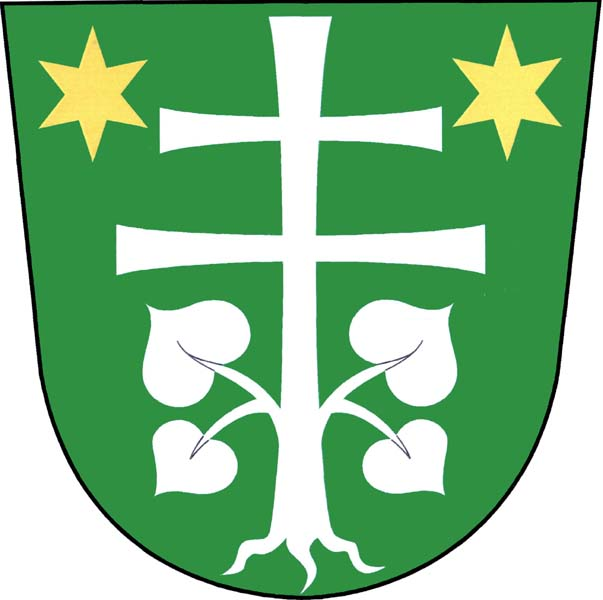
- Flag Coat of arms

- Location in the Czech Republic
- Coordinates: 49°25′44″N 16°47′59″E
- Country: Czech Republic
- Region: South Moravian
- District: Blansko
- First mentioned: 1371

Area
  - Total: 12.12 km^{2} (4.68 sq mi)
- Elevation: 580 m (1,900 ft)

Population (2026-01-01)
  - Total: 766
  - Density: 63.2/km^{2} (164/sq mi)
- Time zone: UTC+1 (CET)
  - Summer (DST): UTC+2 (CEST)
- Postal code: 679 13
- Website: www.vysocany.com

Vysočany is a municipality in Blansko District in the South Moravian Region of the Czech Republic. It has about 800 inhabitants.

== Administrative division ==
Vysočany consists of two municipal parts (in brackets population according to the 2021 census):

- Housko (189)
- Molenburk (556)

== Geography ==
Vysočany is located about 13 kilometres (8 mi) northeast of Blansko and 28 km (17 mi) northeast of Brno. It lies in the Drahany Highlands. The highest point is the hill Havlenka at 636 m (2,087 ft) above sea level. There is the fishpond Polačka located between Housko and Molenburk.

== History ==
The first written mention of Housko is from 1371, when it was part of the Holštejn estate. During the Hussite Wars, the village was burned down and abandoned. In the first half of the 18th century, Housko was re-established by Karel Ludvík Count of Roggendorf. Molenburk was founded in 1724, also by Count of Roggendorf. In 1964, the two municipalities were merged.

== Demographics ==
Historical population

Year	Pop.	±%
1869	891	—
1880	927	+4.0%
1890	916	−1.2%
1900	871	−4.9%
1910	868	−0.3%

Year	Pop.	±%
1921	937	+7.9%
1930	817	−12.8%
1950	763	−6.6%
1961	877	+14.9%
1970	884	+0.8%

Year	Pop.	±%
1980	862	−2.5%
1991	825	−4.3%
2001	791	−4.1%
2011	787	−0.5%
2021	745	−5.3%

Source: Censuses

== Transport ==
There are no railways or major roads passing through the municipality.

== Sights ==
The only protected cultural monument in the municipality is a stone cross dating from 1806, located in the centre of Housko.

The main landmark is the Church of Saints Cyril and Methodius in Molenburk. It was built in 1873.
