= Bukovinka =

Municipality in the Czech Republic

- Municipality
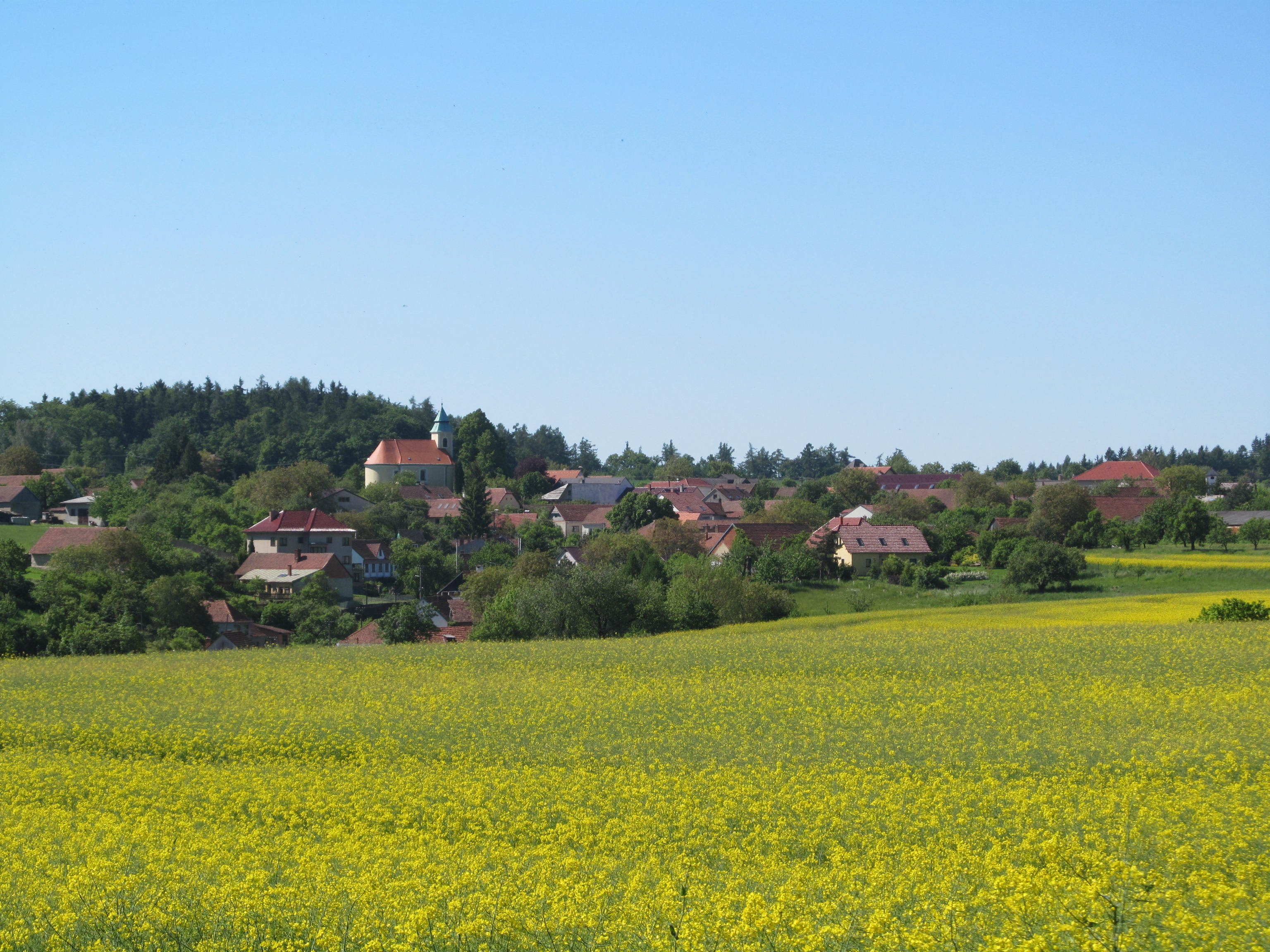
- View from the northeast

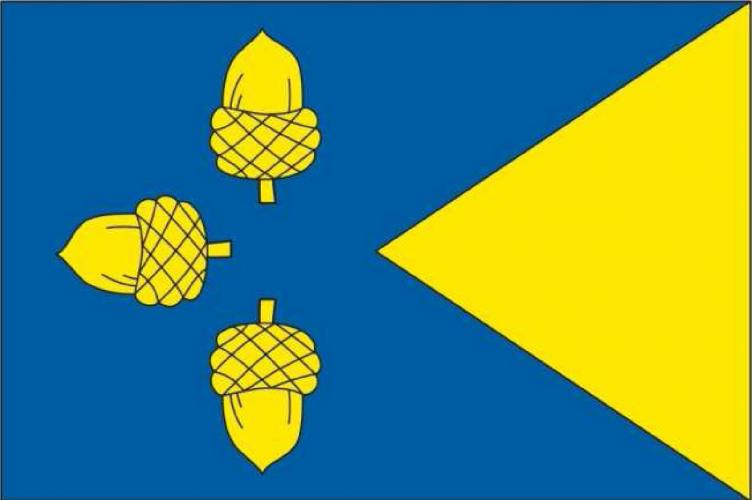
- Flag Coat of arms

- Location in the Czech Republic
- Coordinates: 49°17′39″N 16°48′18″E
- Country: Czech Republic
- Region: South Moravian
- District: Blansko
- First mentioned: 1268

Area
  - Total: 8.48 km^{2} (3.27 sq mi)
- Elevation: 520 m (1,710 ft)

Population (2026-01-01)
  - Total: 655
  - Density: 77.2/km^{2} (200/sq mi)
- Time zone: UTC+1 (CET)
  - Summer (DST): UTC+2 (CEST)
- Postal code: 679 05
- Website: www.bukovinka.cz

Bukovinka is a municipality and village in Blansko District in the South Moravian Region of the Czech Republic. It has about 700 inhabitants.

Bukovinka lies approximately 14 kilometres (9 mi) south-east of Blansko, 18 km (11 mi) north-east of Brno, and 193 km (120 mi) south-east of Prague.

== History ==
The first written mention of Bukovinka is from 1268.

== Demographics ==
Historical population
Year	Pop.	±%
1869	373	—
1880	405	+8.6%
1890	449	+10.9%
1900	407	−9.4%
1910	422	+3.7%
1921	430	+1.9%
1930	387	−10.0%
1950	423	+9.3%
1961	446	+5.4%
1970	442	−0.9%
1980	391	−11.5%
1991	355	−9.2%
2001	304	−14.4%
2011	476	+56.6%
2021	614	+29.0%
Source: Censuses
