= Kulířov =

- Municipality
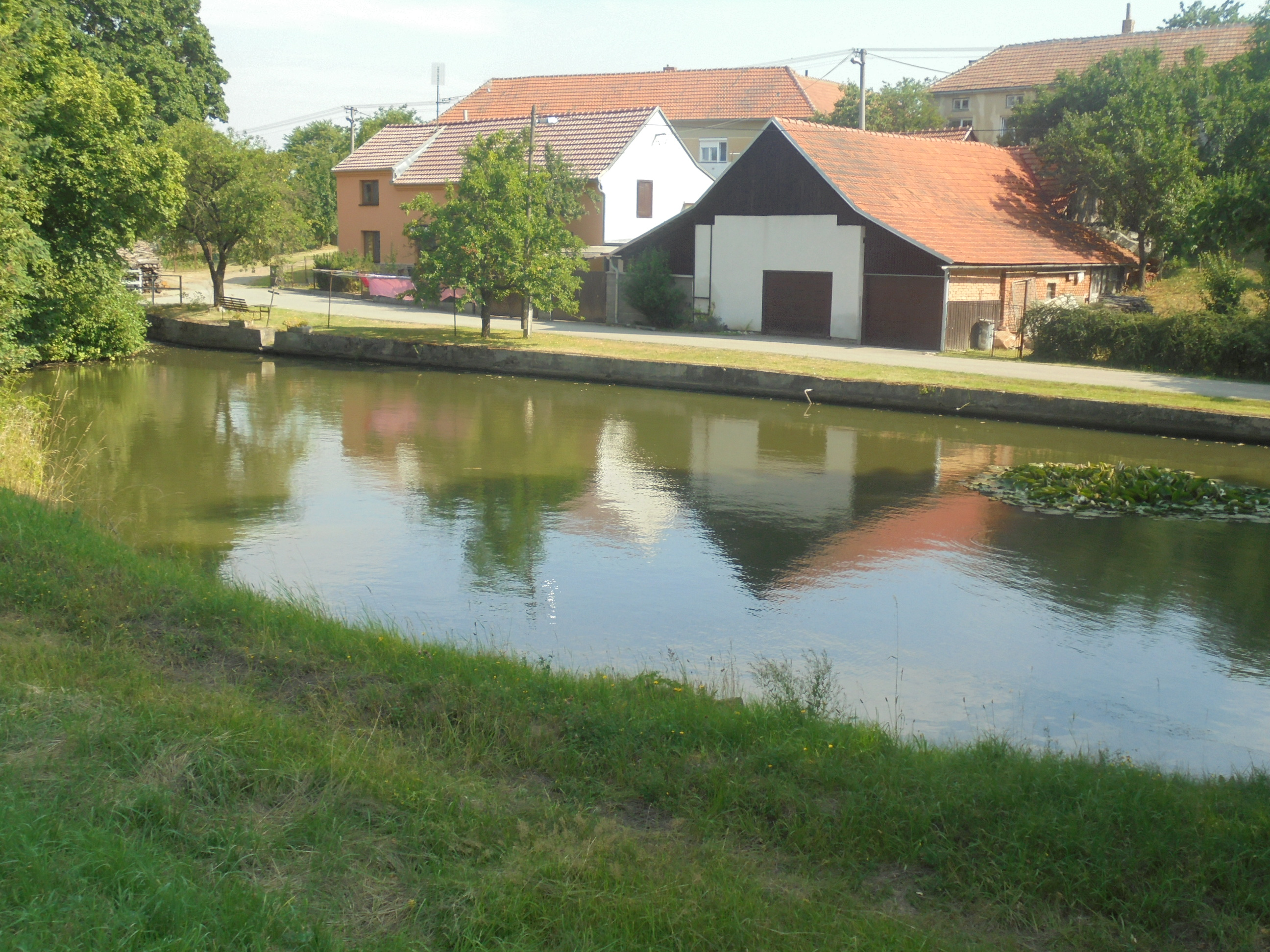
- Pond in the centre of Kulířov

- Location in the Czech Republic
- Coordinates: 49°22′46″N 16°50′49″E
- Country: Czech Republic
- Region: South Moravian
- District: Blansko
- First mentioned: 1349

Area
  - Total: 3.41 km^{2} (1.32 sq mi)
- Elevation: 538 m (1,765 ft)

Population (2026-01-01)
  - Total: 159
  - Density: 46.6/km^{2} (121/sq mi)
- Time zone: UTC+1 (CET)
  - Summer (DST): UTC+2 (CEST)
- Postal code: 679 06
- Website: www.kulirov.cz

Kulířov is a municipality and village in Blansko District in the South Moravian Region of the Czech Republic. It has about 200 inhabitants.

Kulířov lies approximately 15 kilometres (9 mi) east of Blansko, 26 km (16 mi) north-east of Brno, and 192 km (119 mi) south-east of Prague.

== Demographics ==
Historical population
Year	Pop.	±%
1869	546	—
1880	602	+10.3%
1890	662	+10.0%
1900	676	+2.1%
1910	680	+0.6%
1921	684	+0.6%
1930	602	−12.0%
1950	387	−35.7%
1961	454	+17.3%
1970	390	−14.1%
1980	325	−16.7%
1991	271	−16.6%
2001	234	−13.7%
2011	185	−20.9%
2021	160	−13.5%
Source: Censuses
