= Malá Lhota =

- Municipality
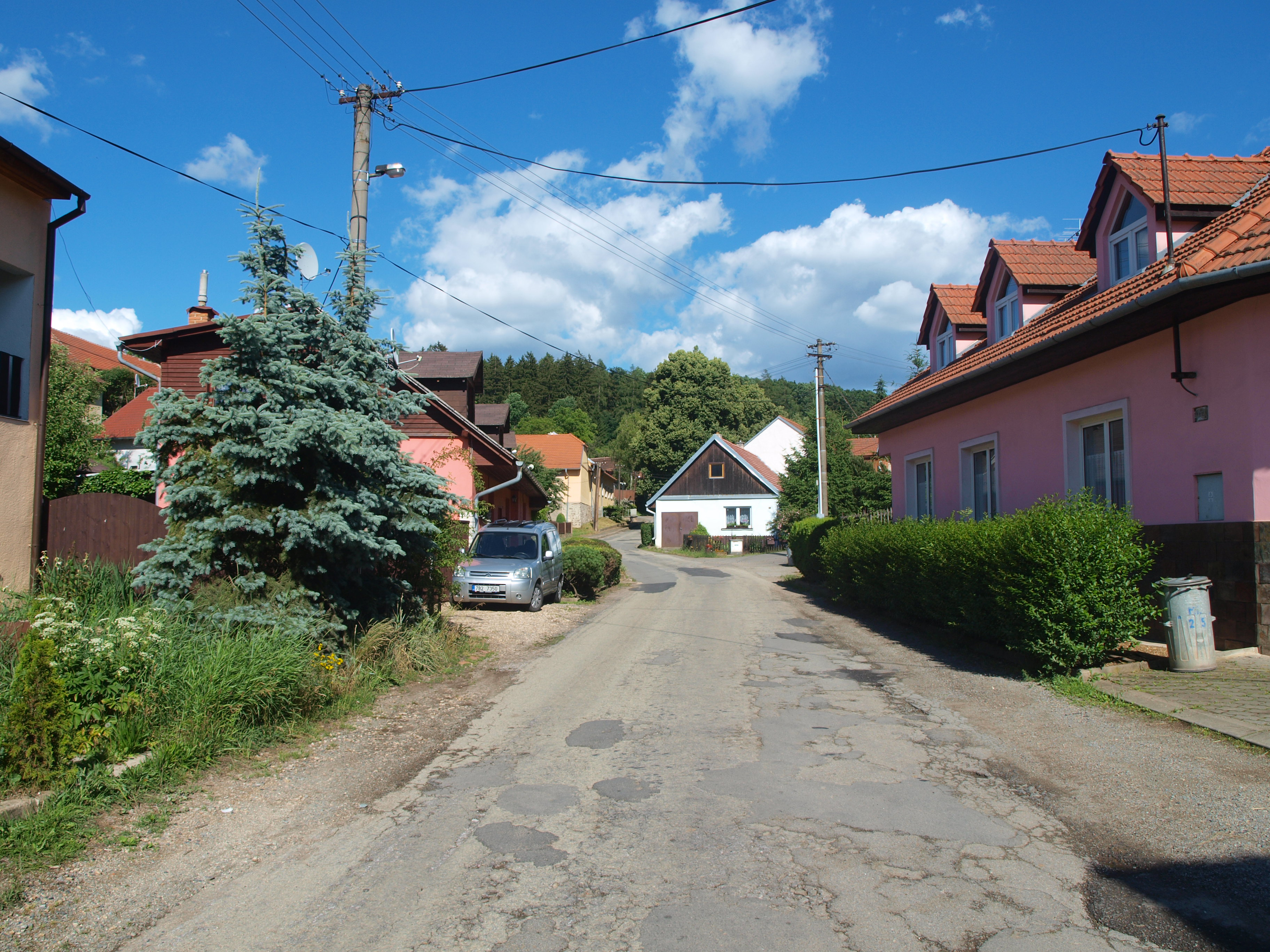
- Centre of Malá Lhota

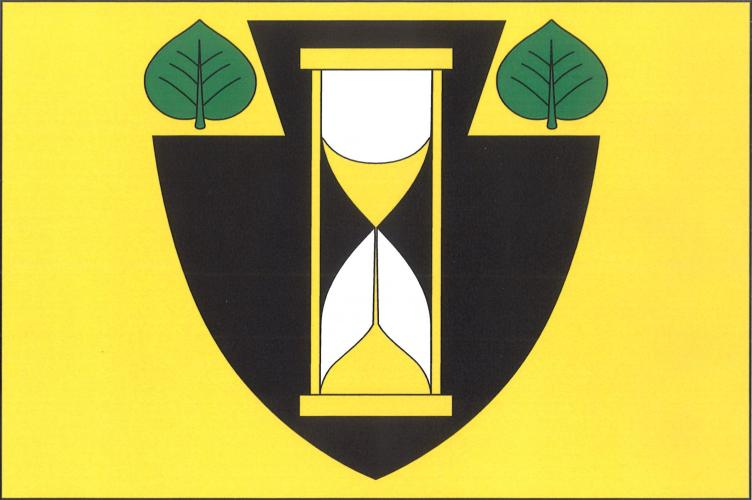
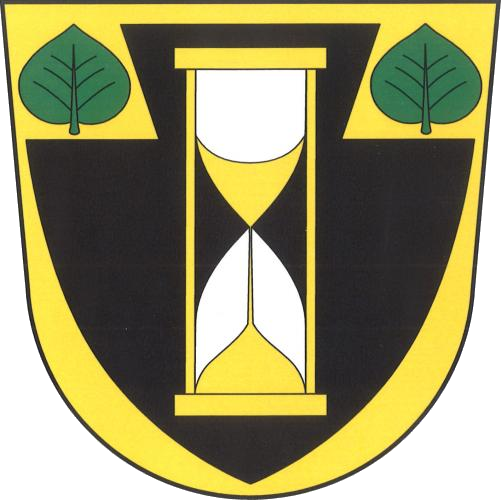
- Flag Coat of arms

- Location in the Czech Republic
- Coordinates: 49°23′31″N 16°32′58″E
- Country: Czech Republic
- Region: South Moravian
- District: Blansko
- First mentioned: 1596

Area
  - Total: 2.63 km^{2} (1.02 sq mi)
- Elevation: 387 m (1,270 ft)

Population (2026-01-01)
  - Total: 162
  - Density: 61.6/km^{2} (160/sq mi)
- Time zone: UTC+1 (CET)
  - Summer (DST): UTC+2 (CEST)
- Postal code: 679 21
- Website: www.malalhota.cz

Malá Lhota is a municipality and village in Blansko District in the South Moravian Region of the Czech Republic. It has about 200 inhabitants.

Malá Lhota lies approximately 8 kilometres (5 mi) west of Blansko, 22 km (14 mi) north of Brno, and 172 km (107 mi) south-east of Prague.

== Demographics ==
Historical population
| Year | Pop. | ±% |
|---|---|---|
| 1869 | 236 | — |
| 1880 | 254 | +7.6% |
| 1890 | 238 | −6.3% |
| 1900 | 260 | +9.2% |
| 1910 | 268 | +3.1% |
| 1921 | 254 | −5.2% |
| 1930 | 230 | −9.4% |
| 1950 | 244 | +6.1% |
| 1961 | 248 | +1.6% |
| 1970 | 222 | −10.5% |
| 1980 | 172 | −22.5% |
| 1991 | 134 | −22.1% |
| 2001 | 133 | −0.7% |
| 2011 | 155 | +16.5% |
| 2021 | 161 | +3.9% |
Source: Censuses
