= Češkovice =

- Municipal part
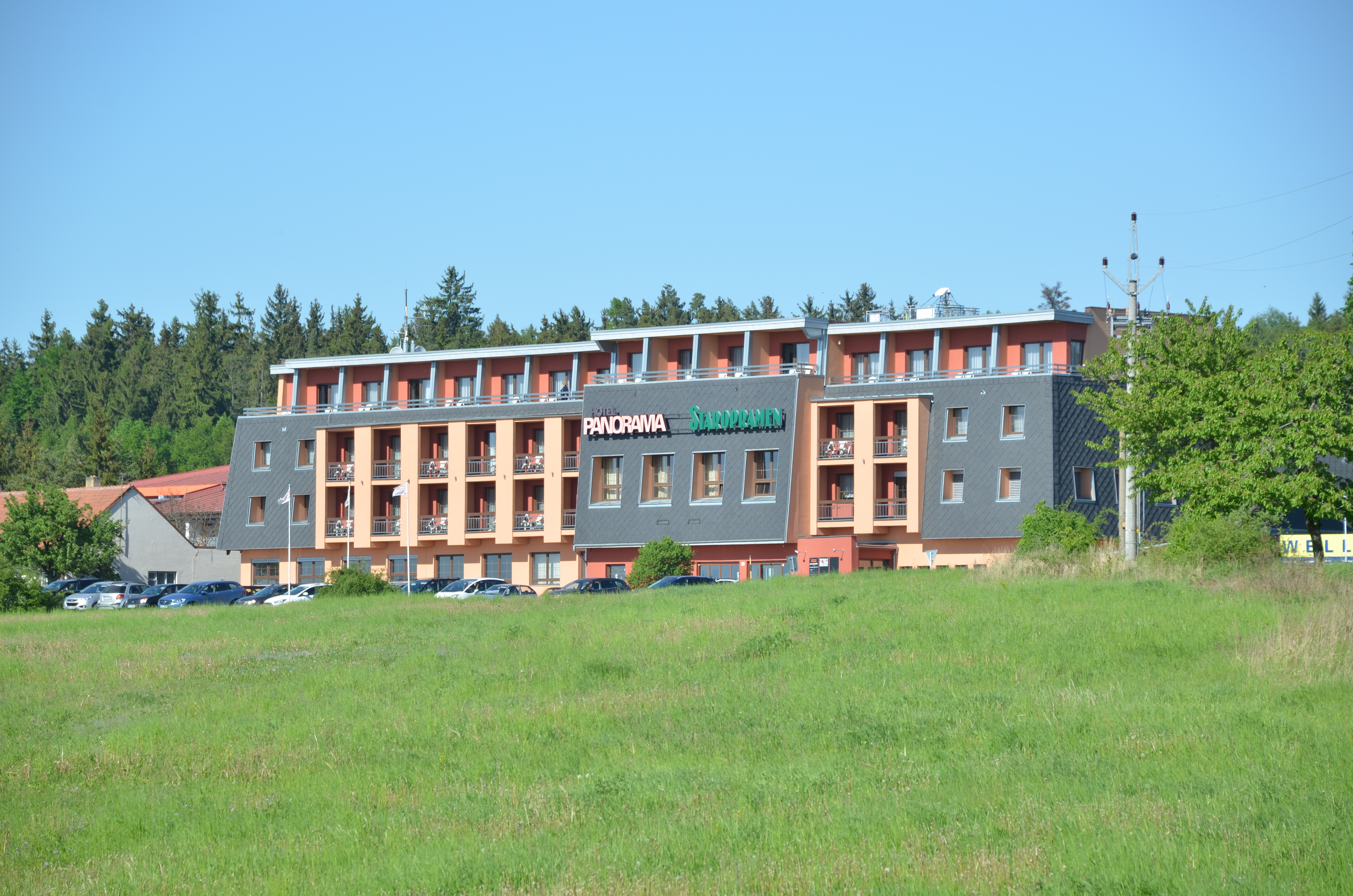
- Hotel Panorama
- Interactive map of Češkovice
- Country: Czech Republic
- Region: South Moravian Region
- District: Blansko
- Municipality: Blansko
- Established: 6 December 2011

Area
  - Total: 0.61 km^{2} (0.24 sq mi)

Population (2021)
  - Total: 385
  - Density: 630/km^{2} (1,600/sq mi)
- Time zone: UTC+1 (CET)
  - Summer (DST): UTC+2 (CEST)
- Postal code: 678 01

Češkovice is a village and municipal part of the town of Blansko in Blansko District of the South Moravian Region of the Czech Republic. It has 385 inhabitants as of the 2021 census.

It is located about 3 kilometres (1.9 mi) northeast of Blansko and 20 kilometres (12 mi) northeast of Brno.

== History ==
In the first third of the 19th century, the Češkovice courtyard (Češkovický dvůr) was located here, which was the only building in the present settlement even after World War II. During socialism, a large cottage area was created here. In the 1980s, the current Panorama Hotel was built on the site of the court. After 1989, the Vyhlídka Hotel was built next to it, and construction of villa districts began in the vicinity, the oldest and largest of which is known as the "Garden City".

Češkovice became a municipal part on 6 December 2011.

== Demographics ==
Historical population

Year	Pop.	±%
1900	16	—
1910	13	−18.8%
1930	4	−69.2%
1980	13	+225.0%

Year	Pop.	±%
1991	4	−69.2%
2001	57	+1325.0%
2011	159	+178.9%
2021	385	+142.1%

Source: Censuses
