= Lhota u Olešnice =

- Municipality
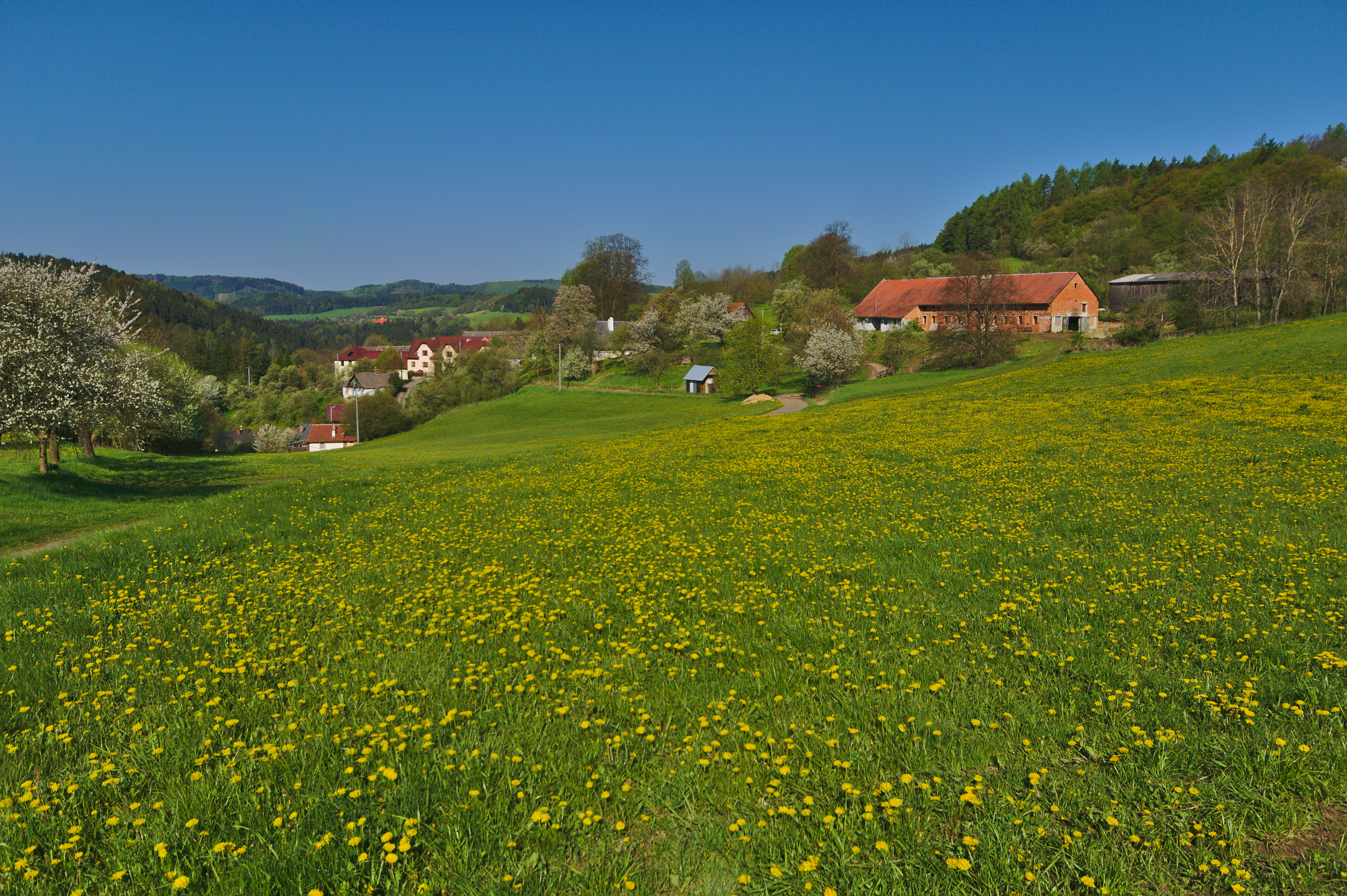
- View from the east

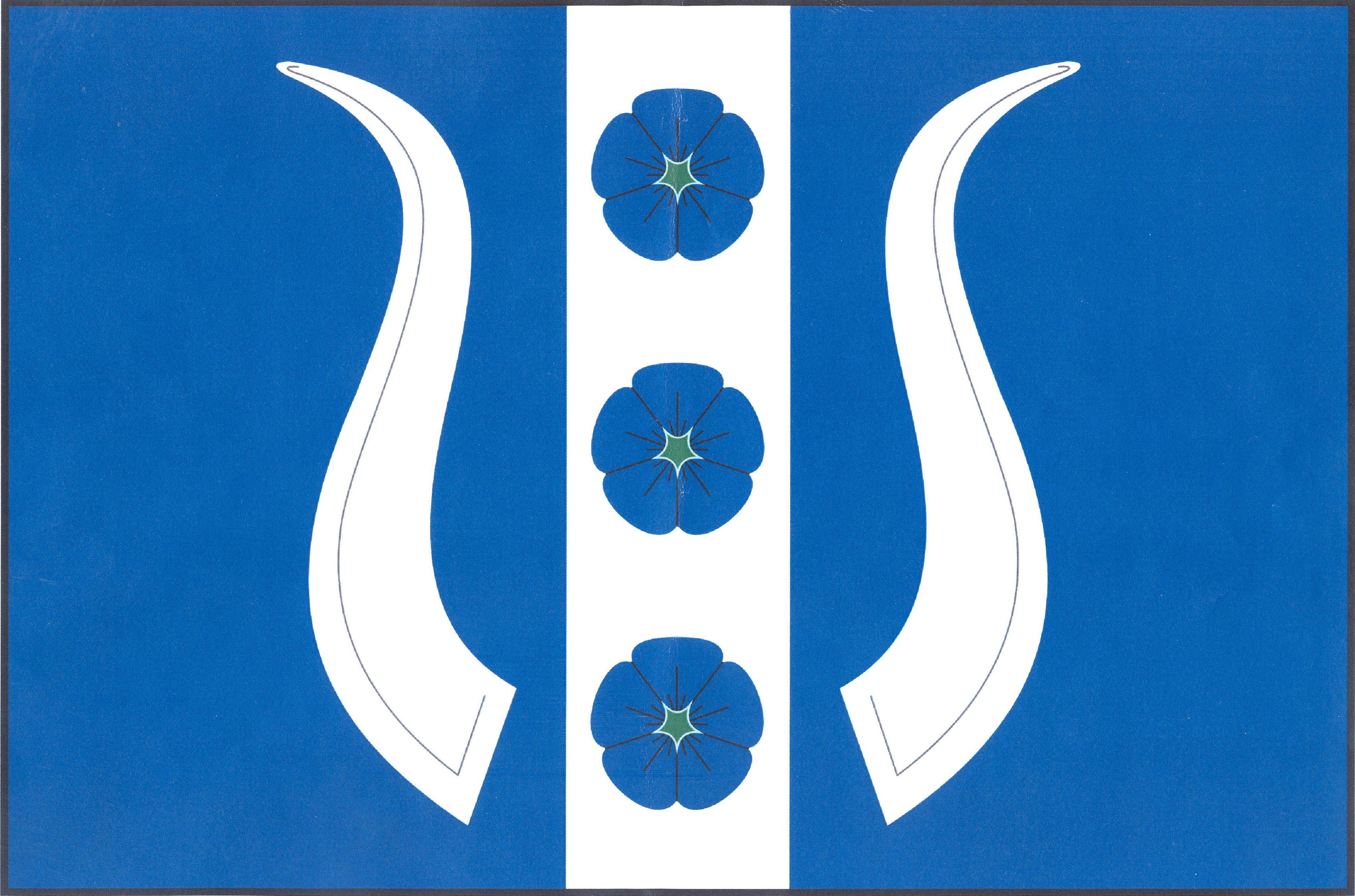
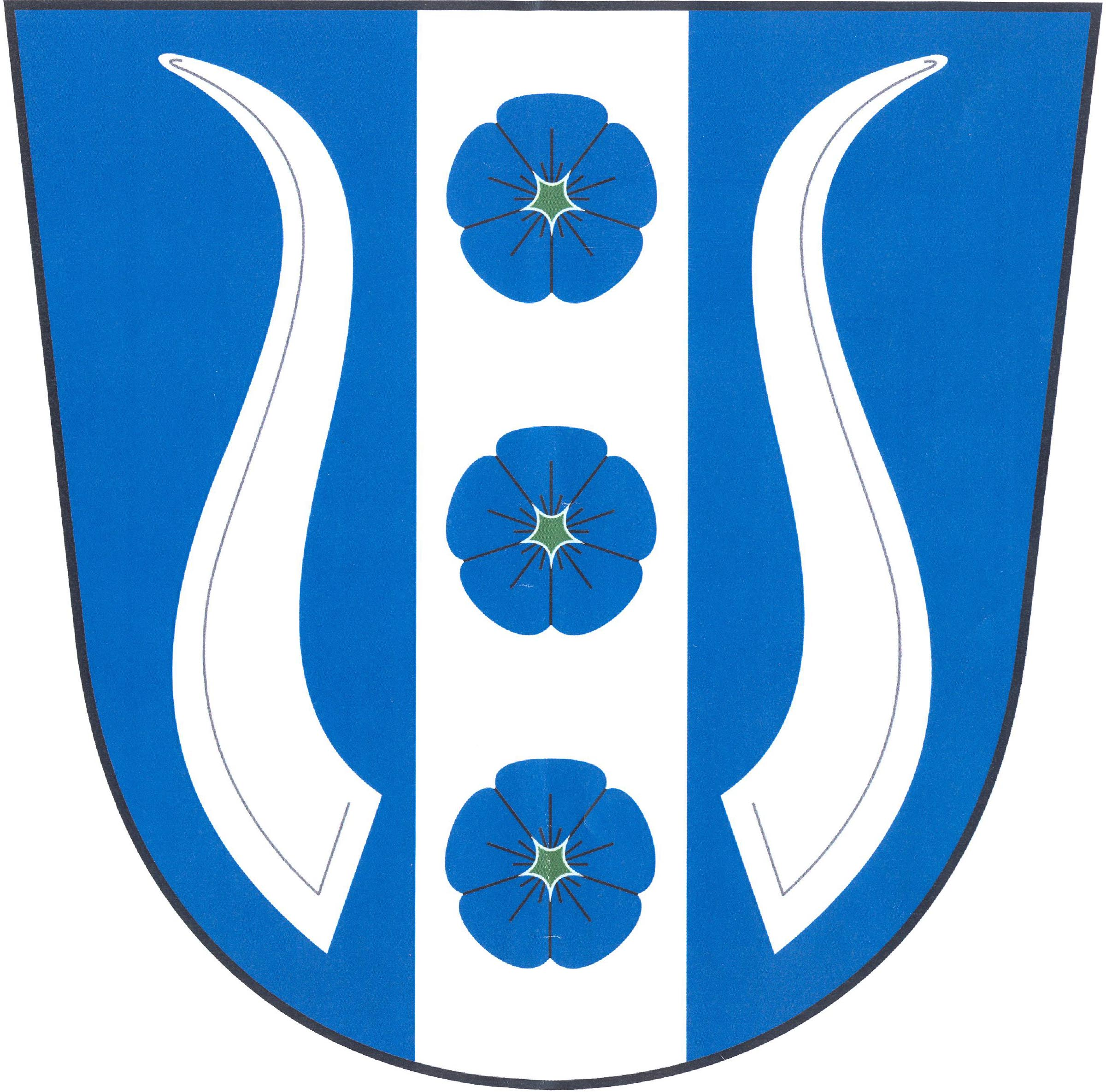
- Flag Coat of arms

- Location in the Czech Republic
- Coordinates: 49°32′41″N 16°23′27″E
- Country: Czech Republic
- Region: South Moravian
- District: Blansko
- First mentioned: 1349

Area
  - Total: 2.26 km^{2} (0.87 sq mi)
- Elevation: 485 m (1,591 ft)

Population (2026-01-01)
  - Total: 44
  - Density: 19/km^{2} (50/sq mi)
- Time zone: UTC+1 (CET)
  - Summer (DST): UTC+2 (CEST)
- Postal code: 679 74
- Website: www.lhotauolesnice.cz

Lhota u Olešnice is a municipality and village in Blansko District in the South Moravian Region of the Czech Republic. It has about 40 inhabitants.

Lhota u Olešnice lies approximately 28 kilometres (17 mi) north-west of Blansko, 43 km (27 mi) north-west of Brno, and 154 km (96 mi) south-east of Prague.

== Demographics ==
Historical population
Year	Pop.	±%
1869	202	—
1880	191	−5.4%
1890	186	−2.6%
1900	187	+0.5%
1910	177	−5.3%
1921	185	+4.5%
1930	164	−11.4%
1950	131	−20.1%
1961	131	+0.0%
1970	95	−27.5%
1980	71	−25.3%
1991	44	−38.0%
2001	37	−15.9%
2011	37	+0.0%
2021	42	+13.5%
Source: Censuses
