= Sulíkov =

- Municipality
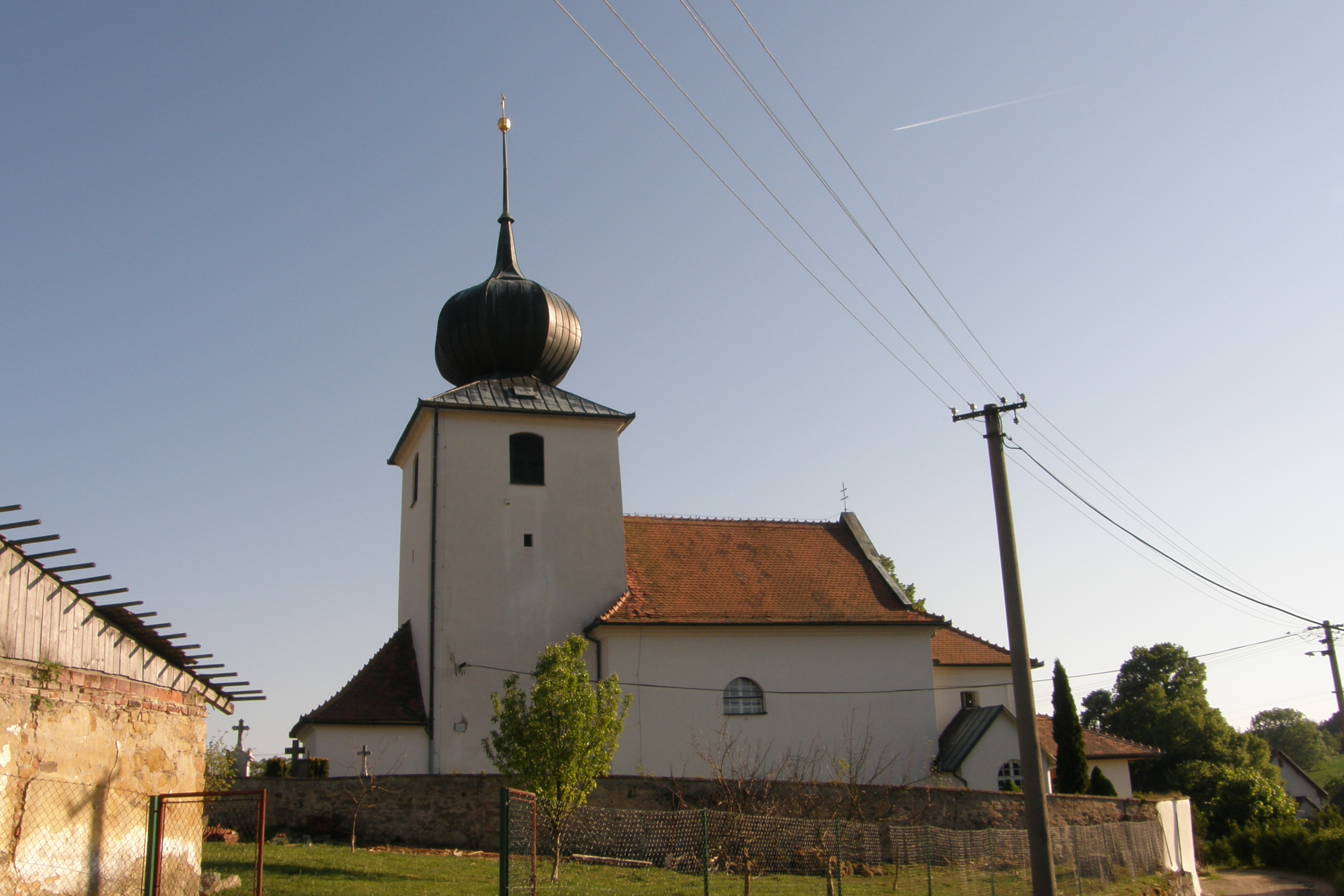
- Church of Saint Mary Magdalene

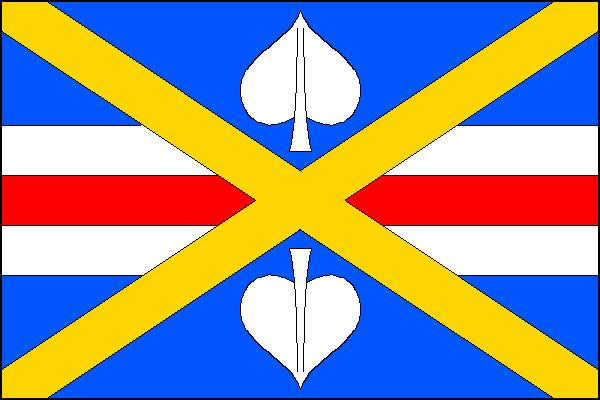
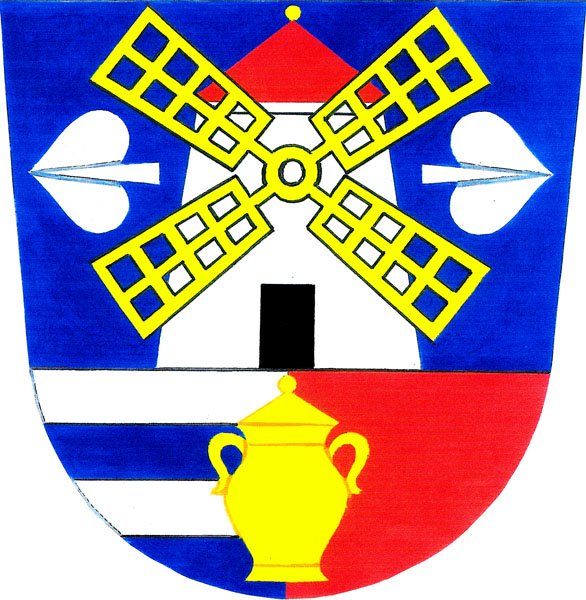
- Flag Coat of arms

- Location in the Czech Republic
- Coordinates: 49°32′41″N 16°29′23″E
- Country: Czech Republic
- Region: South Moravian
- District: Blansko
- First mentioned: 1374

Area
  - Total: 3.72 km^{2} (1.44 sq mi)
- Elevation: 562 m (1,844 ft)

Population (2026-01-01)
  - Total: 305
  - Density: 82.0/km^{2} (212/sq mi)
- Time zone: UTC+1 (CET)
  - Summer (DST): UTC+2 (CEST)
- Postal code: 679 62
- Website: www.sulikov.cz

Sulíkov is a municipality and village in Blansko District in the South Moravian Region of the Czech Republic. It has about 300 inhabitants.

Sulíkov lies approximately 24 kilometres (15 mi) north-west of Blansko, 40 km (25 mi) north of Brno, and 160 km (99 mi) east of Prague.

== Administrative division ==
Sulíkov consists of two municipal parts (in brackets population according to the 2021 census):

- Sulíkov (178)
- Vřesice (113)

== Demographics ==
Historical population
Year	Pop.	±%
1869	218	—
1880	237	+8.7%
1890	238	+0.4%
1900	241	+1.3%
1910	247	+2.5%
1921	248	+0.4%
1930	249	+0.4%
1950	207	−16.9%
1961	229	+10.6%
1970	229	+0.0%
1980	257	+12.2%
1991	268	+4.3%
2001	264	−1.5%
2011	277	+4.9%
2021	291	+5.1%
Source: Censuses
