= Valchov =

- Municipality
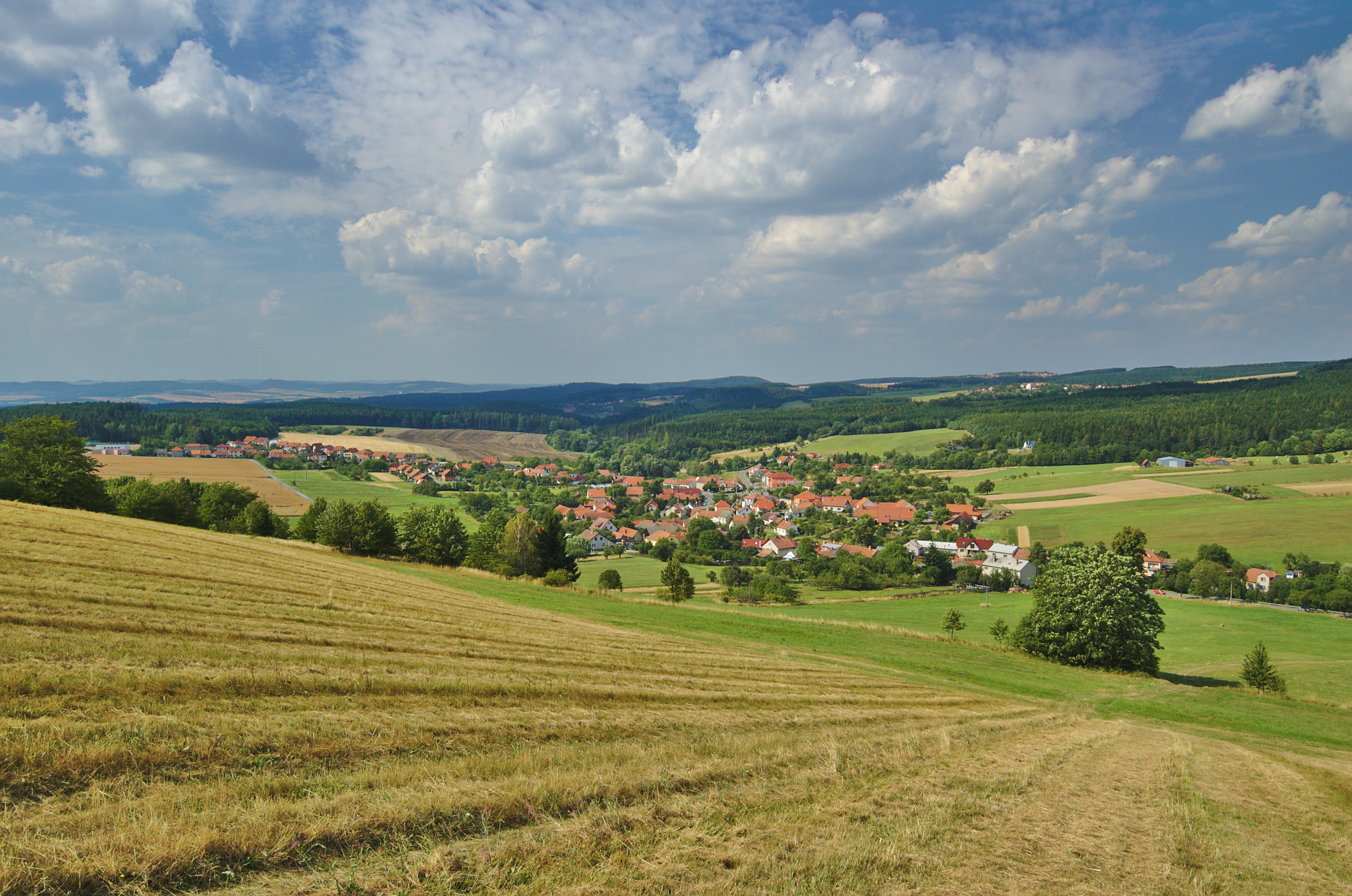
- View from the south

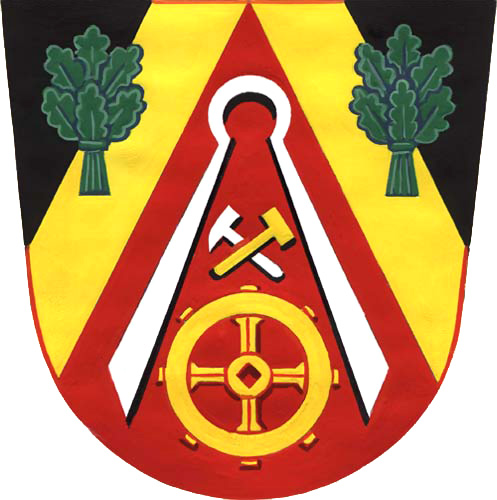
- Flag Coat of arms

- Location in the Czech Republic
- Coordinates: 49°28′13″N 16°43′12″E
- Country: Czech Republic
- Region: South Moravian
- District: Blansko
- First mentioned: 1505

Area
  - Total: 3.72 km^{2} (1.44 sq mi)
- Elevation: 482 m (1,581 ft)

Population (2026-01-01)
  - Total: 471
  - Density: 127/km^{2} (328/sq mi)
- Time zone: UTC+1 (CET)
  - Summer (DST): UTC+2 (CEST)
- Postal code: 680 01
- Website: valchov.cz

Valchov is a municipality and village in Blansko District in the South Moravian Region of the Czech Republic. It has about 500 inhabitants.

Valchov lies approximately 13 kilometres (8 mi) north-east of Blansko, 31 km (19 mi) north of Brno, and 180 km (110 mi) south-east of Prague.

== Demographics ==
Historical population
Year	Pop.	±%
1869	387	—
1880	378	−2.3%
1890	374	−1.1%
1900	415	+11.0%
1910	389	−6.3%
1921	411	+5.7%
1930	406	−1.2%
1950	414	+2.0%
1961	465	+12.3%
1970	439	−5.6%
1980	425	−3.2%
1991	425	+0.0%
2001	447	+5.2%
2011	464	+3.8%
2021	445	−4.1%
Source: Censuses
