= Újezd u Boskovic =

- Municipality
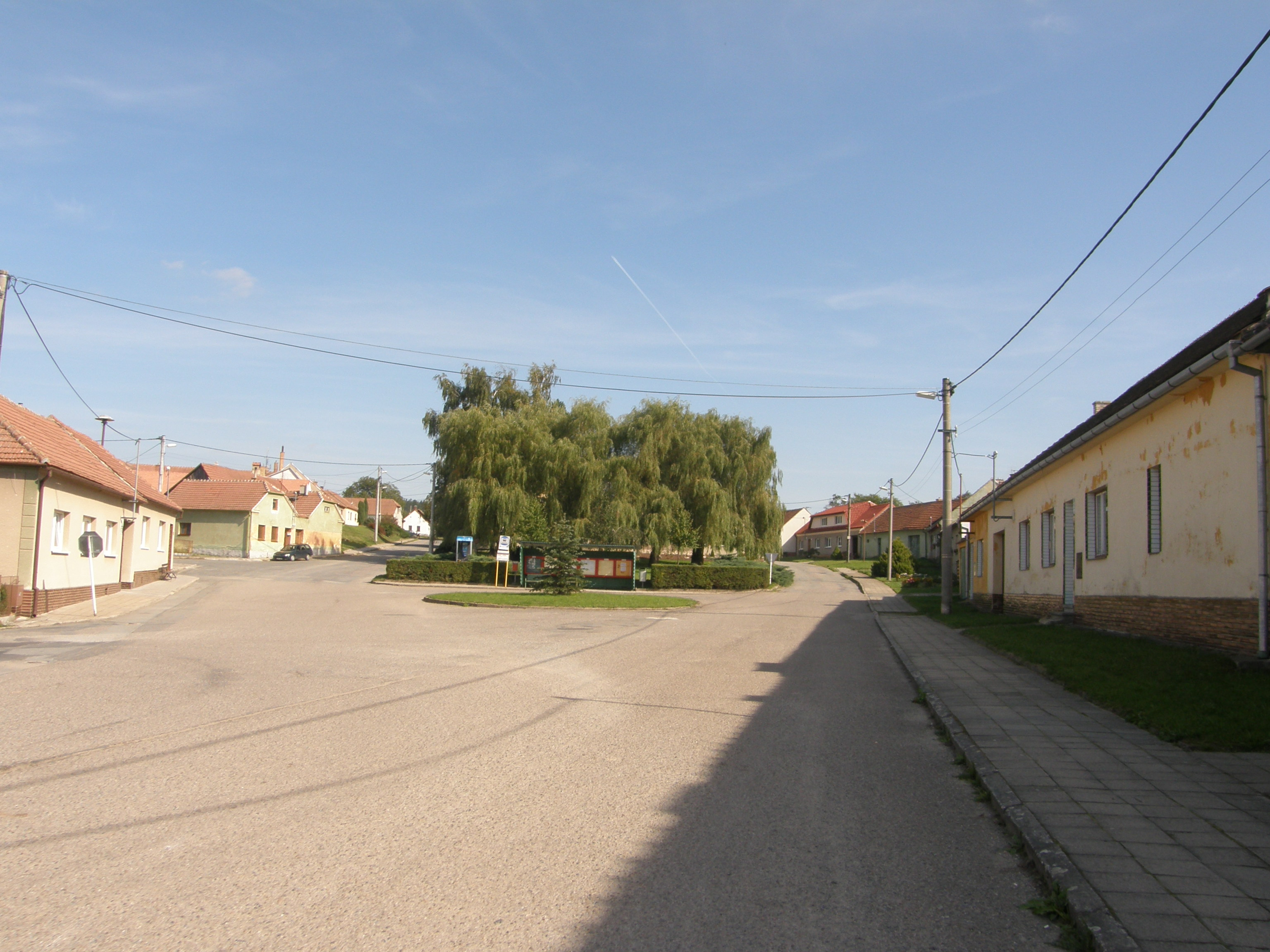
- Centre of Újezd u Boskovic

- Flag Coat of arms

- Location in the Czech Republic
- Coordinates: 49°27′50″N 16°39′15″E
- Country: Czech Republic
- Region: South Moravian
- District: Blansko
- First mentioned: 1505

Area
  - Total: 12.78 km^{2} (4.93 sq mi)
- Elevation: 527 m (1,729 ft)

Population (2026-01-01)
  - Total: 453
  - Density: 35.4/km^{2} (91.8/sq mi)
- Time zone: UTC+1 (CET)
  - Summer (DST): UTC+2 (CEST)
- Postal code: 680 01
- Website: www.ujezduboskovic.cz

Újezd u Boskovic is a municipality and village in Blansko District in the South Moravian Region of the Czech Republic. It has about 500 inhabitants.

Újezd u Boskovic lies approximately 12 kilometres (7 mi) north of Blansko, 30 km (19 mi) north of Brno, and 177 km (110 mi) south-east of Prague.

== Demographics ==
Historical population
Year	Pop.	±%
1869	500	—
1880	549	+9.8%
1890	580	+5.6%
1900	602	+3.8%
1910	651	+8.1%
1921	652	+0.2%
1930	651	−0.2%
1950	580	−10.9%
1961	559	−3.6%
1970	510	−8.8%
1980	499	−2.2%
1991	446	−10.6%
2001	444	−0.4%
2011	473	+6.5%
2021	451	−4.7%
Source: Censuses
