= Crhov =

- Municipality
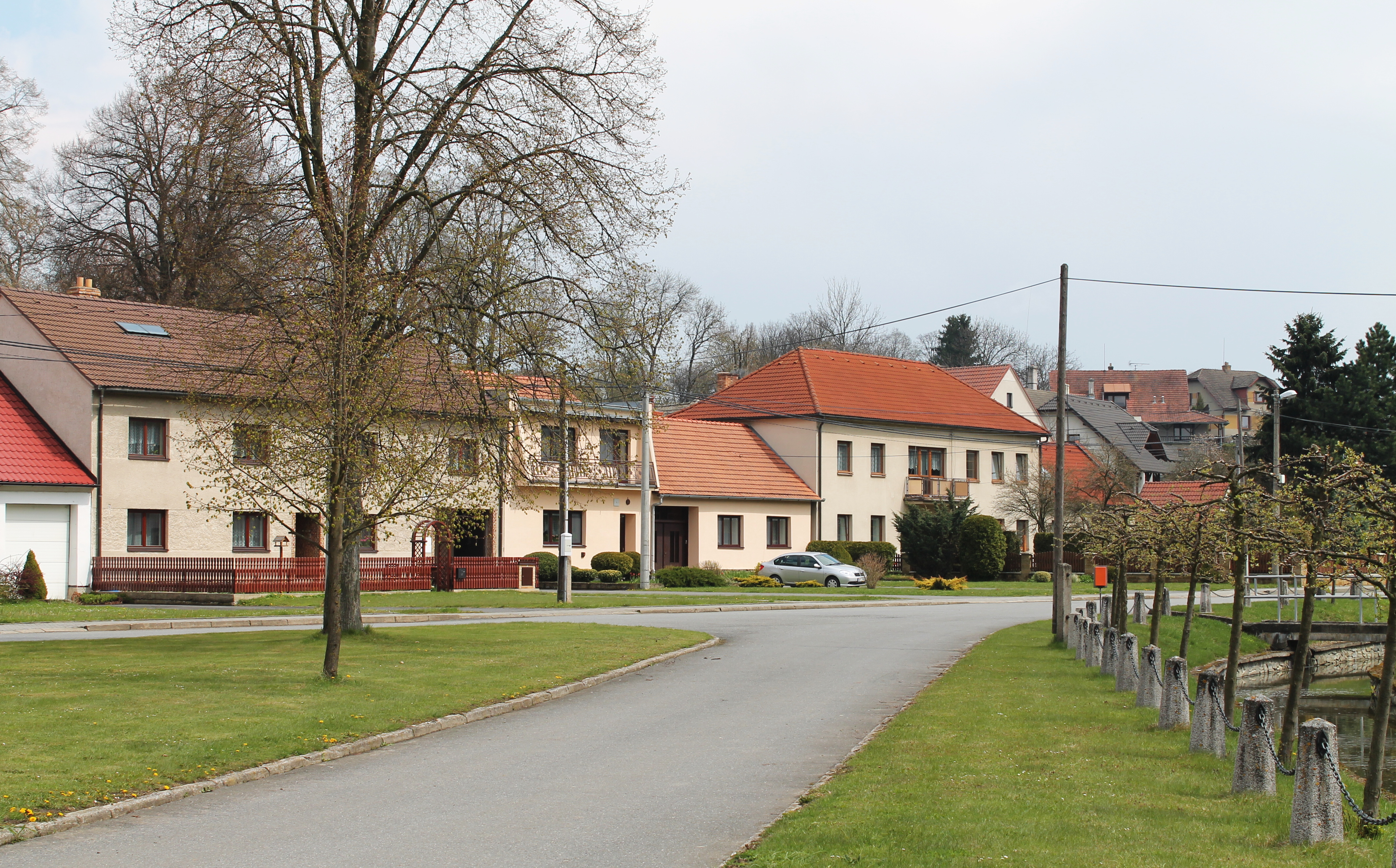
- Centre of Crhov

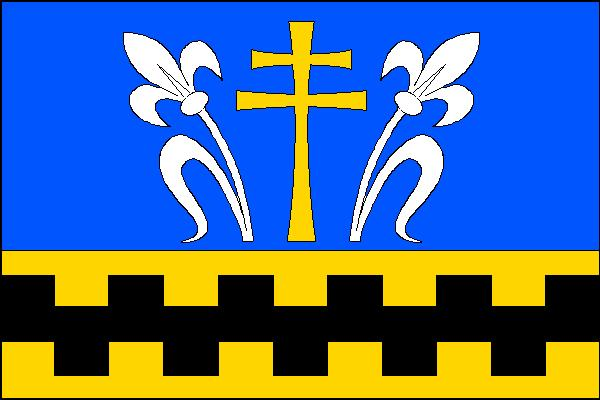
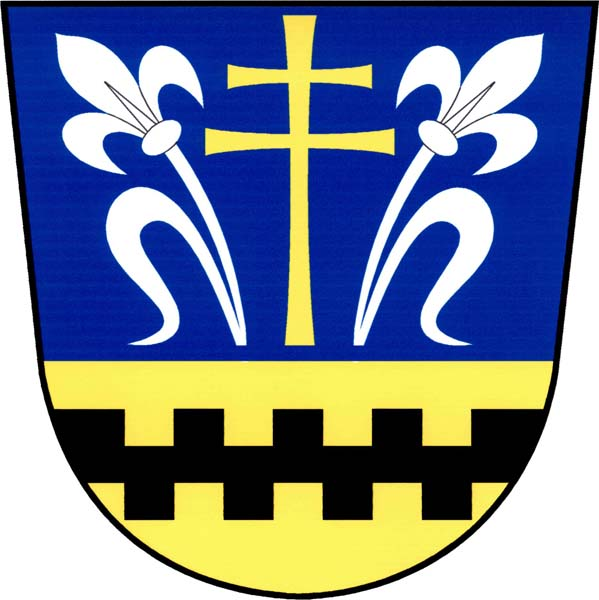
- Flag Coat of arms

- Location in the Czech Republic
- Coordinates: 49°32′42″N 16°26′5″E
- Country: Czech Republic
- Region: South Moravian
- District: Blansko
- First mentioned: 1353

Area
  - Total: 3.65 km^{2} (1.41 sq mi)
- Elevation: 538 m (1,765 ft)

Population (2026-01-01)
  - Total: 170
  - Density: 47/km^{2} (120/sq mi)
- Time zone: UTC+1 (CET)
  - Summer (DST): UTC+2 (CEST)
- Postal code: 679 74
- Website: www.obeccrhov.cz

Crhov is a municipality and village in Blansko District in the South Moravian Region of the Czech Republic. It has about 200 inhabitants.

Crhov lies approximately 26 kilometres (16 mi) north-west of Blansko, 41 km (25 mi) north of Brno, and 157 km (98 mi) south-east of Prague.

== Demographics ==
Historical population
Year	Pop.	±%
1869	288	—
1880	254	−11.8%
1890	272	+7.1%
1900	321	+18.0%
1910	311	−3.1%
1921	311	+0.0%
1930	265	−14.8%
1950	228	−14.0%
1961	242	+6.1%
1970	224	−7.4%
1980	190	−15.2%
1991	185	−2.6%
2001	187	+1.1%
2011	171	−8.6%
2021	167	−2.3%
Source: Censuses
