= Roubanina =

- Municipality
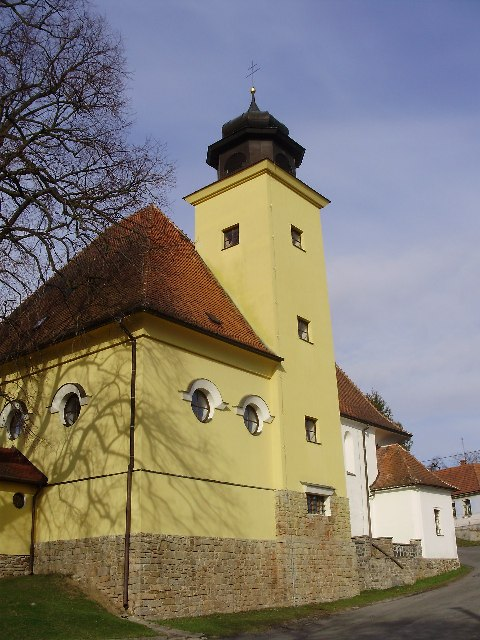
- Church of Saint Andrew

- Flag Coat of arms

- Location in the Czech Republic
- Coordinates: 49°36′56″N 16°35′39″E
- Country: Czech Republic
- Region: South Moravian
- District: Blansko
- First mentioned: 1356

Area
  - Total: 2.69 km^{2} (1.04 sq mi)
- Elevation: 474 m (1,555 ft)

Population (2026-01-01)
  - Total: 121
  - Density: 45.0/km^{2} (117/sq mi)
- Time zone: UTC+1 (CET)
  - Summer (DST): UTC+2 (CEST)
- Postal code: 679 61
- Website: www.roubanina.cz

Roubanina is a municipality and village in Blansko District in the South Moravian Region of the Czech Republic. It has about 100 inhabitants.

Roubanina lies approximately 28 kilometres (17 mi) north of Blansko, 47 km (29 mi) north of Brno, and 165 km (103 mi) east of Prague.

== Demographics ==
Historical population
Year	Pop.	±%
1869	261	—
1880	257	−1.5%
1890	252	−1.9%
1900	272	+7.9%
1910	260	−4.4%
1921	236	−9.2%
1930	218	−7.6%
1950	140	−35.8%
1961	160	+14.3%
1970	172	+7.5%
1980	136	−20.9%
1991	115	−15.4%
2001	125	+8.7%
2011	134	+7.2%
2021	107	−20.1%
Source: Censuses
