= Ústup =

- Municipality
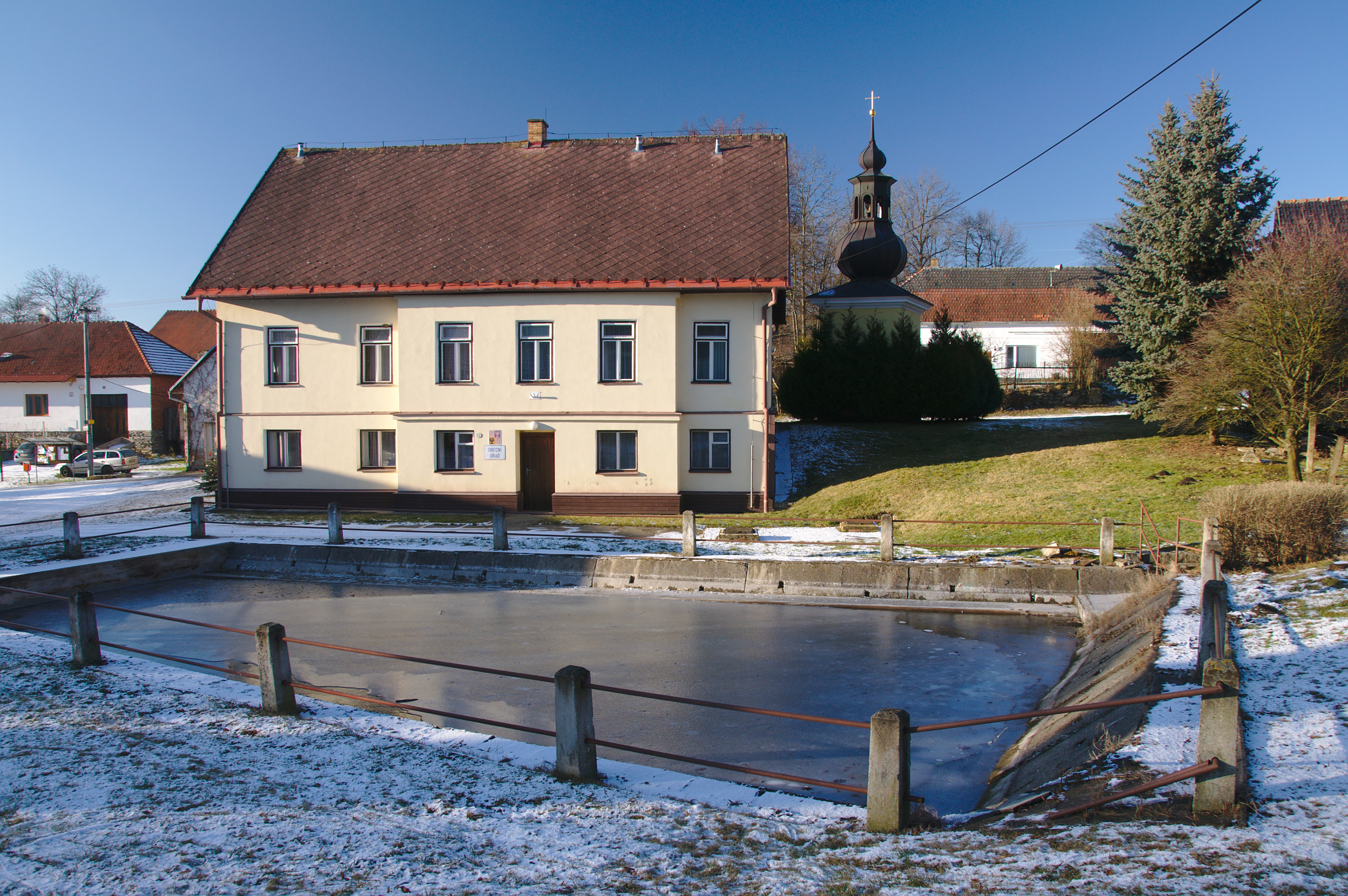
- Municipal office in the centre of Ústup

- Location in the Czech Republic
- Coordinates: 49°33′54″N 16°27′47″E
- Country: Czech Republic
- Region: South Moravian
- District: Blansko
- First mentioned: 1374

Area
  - Total: 2.65 km^{2} (1.02 sq mi)
- Elevation: 634 m (2,080 ft)

Population (2026-01-01)
  - Total: 38
  - Density: 14/km^{2} (37/sq mi)
- Time zone: UTC+1 (CET)
  - Summer (DST): UTC+2 (CEST)
- Postal code: 679 74
- Website: obec-ustup.webnode.cz

Ústup is a municipality and village in Blansko District in the South Moravian Region of the Czech Republic. It has about 40 inhabitants.

Ústup lies approximately 27 kilometres (17 mi) north-west of Blansko, 43 km (27 mi) north of Brno, and 158 km (98 mi) east of Prague.

== Demographics ==
Historical population
Year	Pop.	±%
1869	208	—
1880	220	+5.8%
1890	206	−6.4%
1900	207	+0.5%
1910	194	−6.3%
1921	183	−5.7%
1930	150	−18.0%
1950	113	−24.7%
1961	101	−10.6%
1970	89	−11.9%
1980	75	−15.7%
1991	46	−38.7%
2001	39	−15.2%
2011	49	+25.6%
2021	43	−12.2%
Source: Censuses
