= Kozárov =

- Municipality
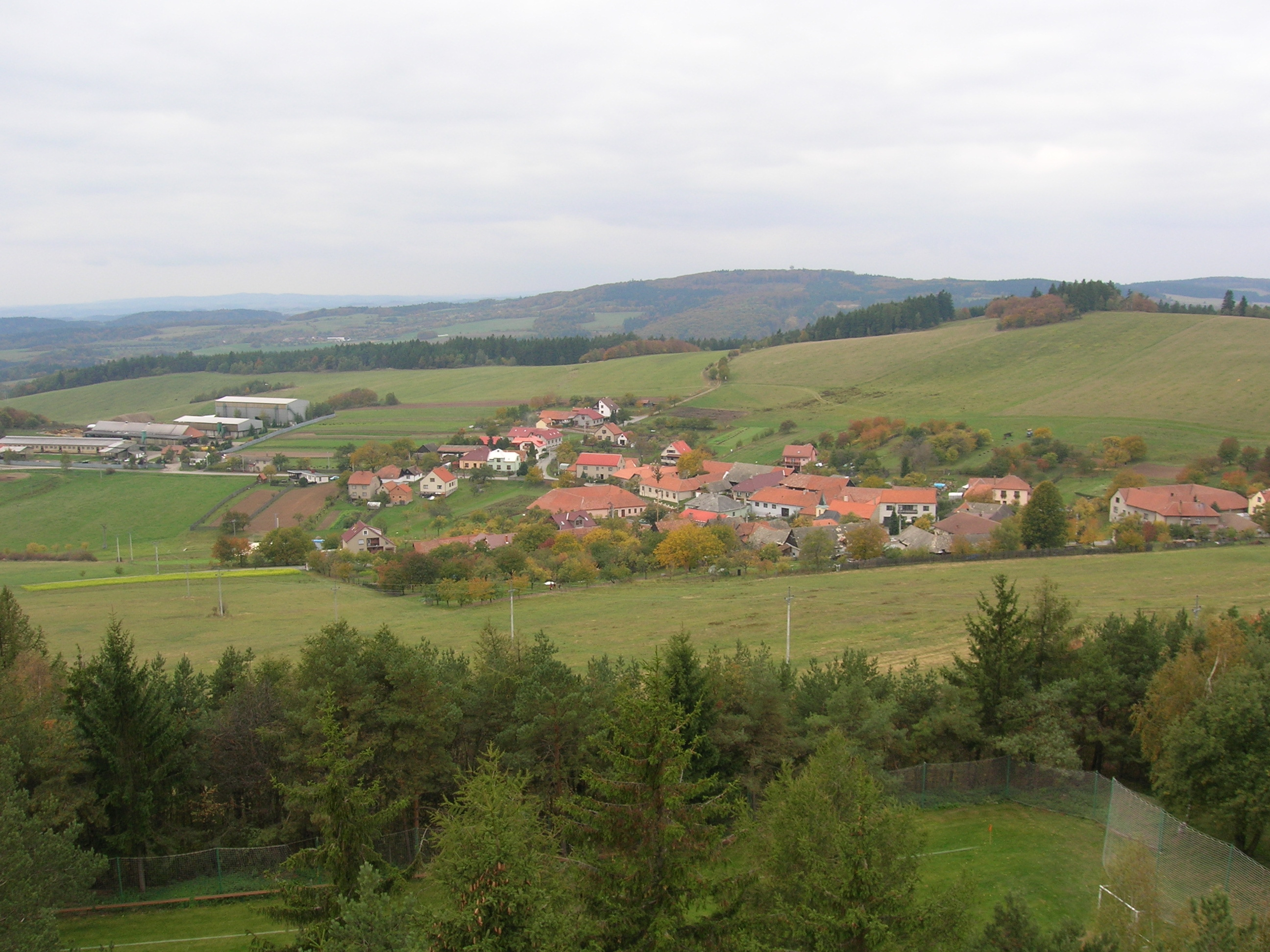
- General view

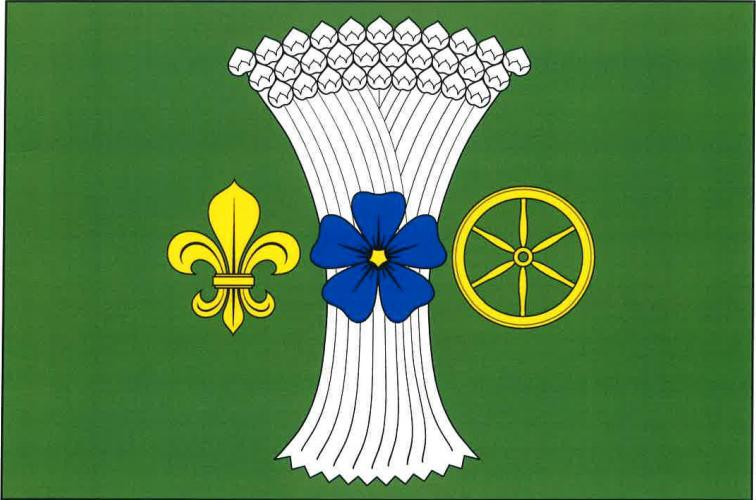
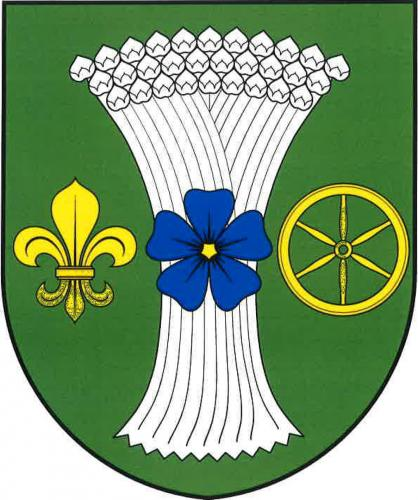
- Flag Coat of arms

- Location in the Czech Republic
- Coordinates: 49°26′38″N 16°27′31″E
- Country: Czech Republic
- Region: South Moravian
- District: Blansko
- First mentioned: 1601

Area
  - Total: 2.30 km^{2} (0.89 sq mi)
- Elevation: 614 m (2,014 ft)

Population (2026-01-01)
  - Total: 121
  - Density: 52.6/km^{2} (136/sq mi)
- Time zone: UTC+1 (CET)
  - Summer (DST): UTC+2 (CEST)
- Postal code: 679 71
- Website: www.kozarov.cz

Kozárov is a municipality and village in Blansko District in the South Moravian Region of the Czech Republic. It has about 100 inhabitants.

Kozárov lies approximately 17 kilometres (11 mi) north-west of Blansko, 30 km (19 mi) north-west of Brno, and 163 km (101 mi) south-east of Prague.

== Demographics ==
Historical population
| Year | Pop. | ±% |
|---|---|---|
| 1869 | 210 | — |
| 1880 | 195 | −7.1% |
| 1890 | 214 | +9.7% |
| 1900 | 189 | −11.7% |
| 1910 | 193 | +2.1% |
| 1921 | 188 | −2.6% |
| 1930 | 171 | −9.0% |
| 1950 | 171 | +0.0% |
| 1961 | 164 | −4.1% |
| 1970 | 156 | −4.9% |
| 1980 | 140 | −10.3% |
| 1991 | 131 | −6.4% |
| 2001 | 115 | −12.2% |
| 2011 | 128 | +11.3% |
| 2021 | 113 | −11.7% |
Source: Censuses
