= Kunčina Ves =

- Municipality
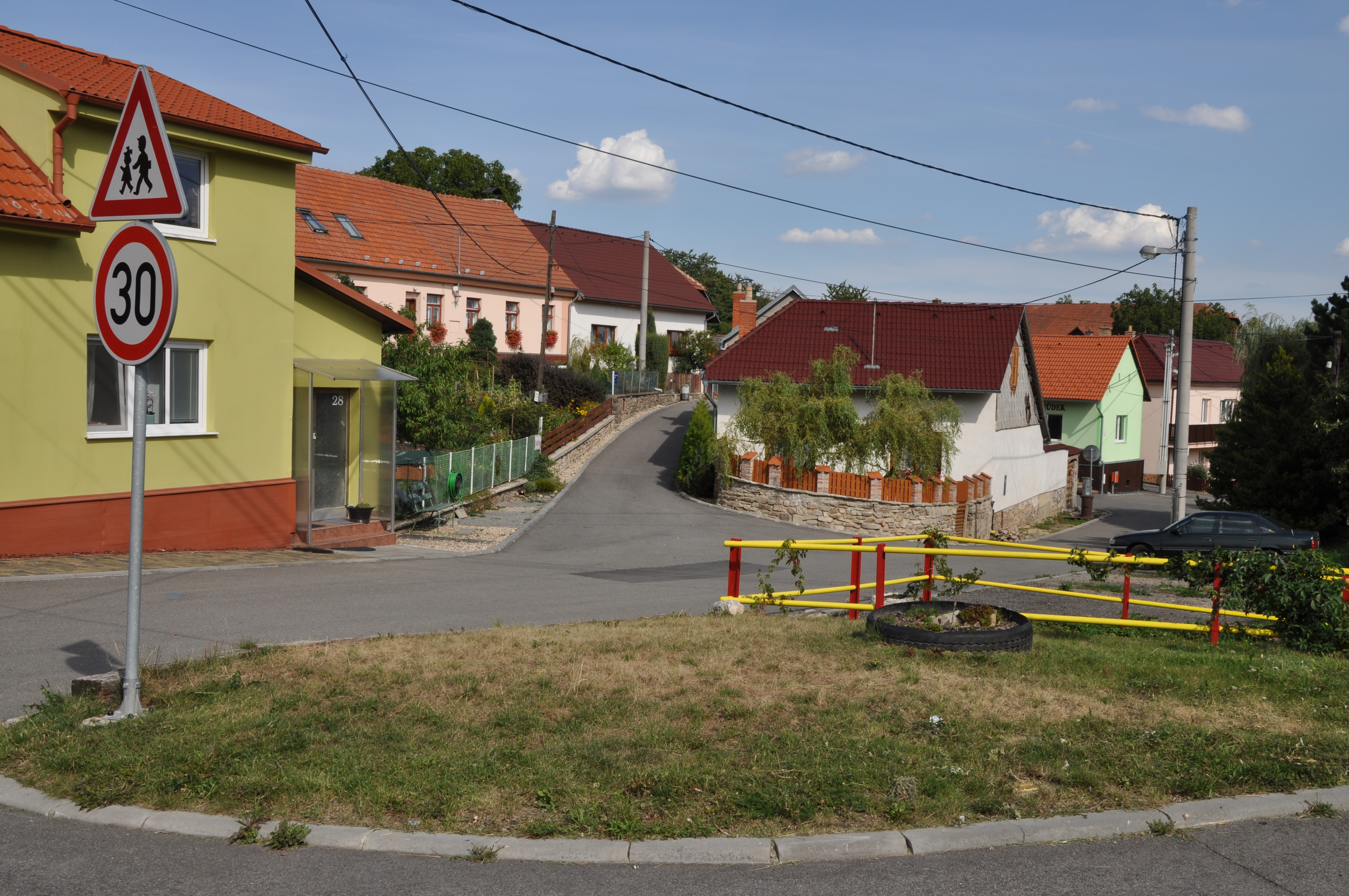
- Centre of Kunčina Ves

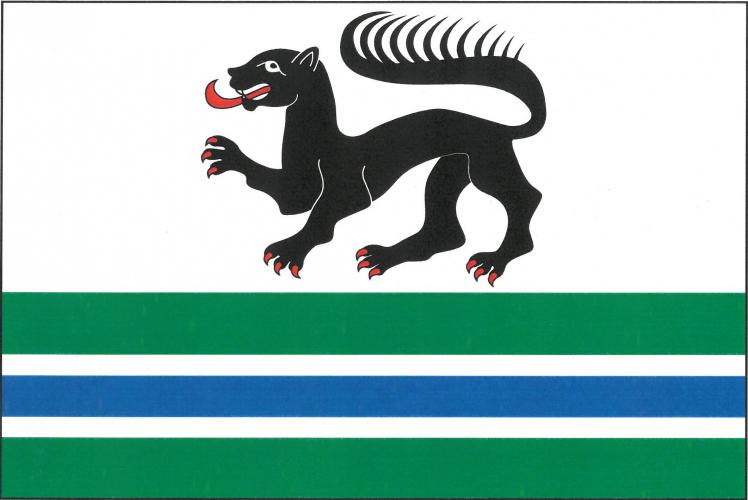
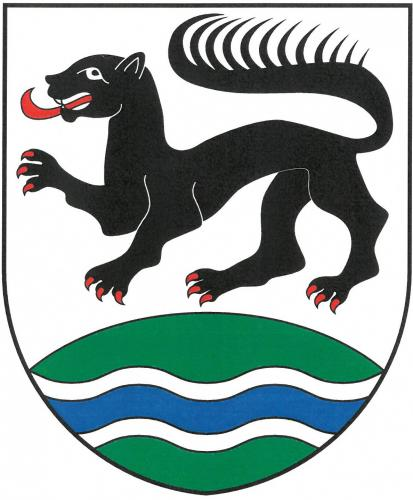
- Flag Coat of arms

- Location in the Czech Republic
- Coordinates: 49°26′49″N 16°28′31″E
- Country: Czech Republic
- Region: South Moravian
- District: Blansko
- First mentioned: 1392

Area
  - Total: 5.26 km^{2} (2.03 sq mi)
- Elevation: 583 m (1,913 ft)

Population (2026-01-01)
  - Total: 66
  - Density: 13/km^{2} (32/sq mi)
- Time zone: UTC+1 (CET)
  - Summer (DST): UTC+2 (CEST)
- Postal code: 679 71
- Website: www.kuncinaves.cz

Kunčina Ves (German: Kunzendorf) is a municipality and village in Blansko District in the South Moravian Region of the Czech Republic. It has about 70 inhabitants.

Kunčina Ves lies approximately 15 kilometres (9 mi) north-west of Blansko, 30 km (19 mi) north of Brno, and 165 km (103 mi) south-east of Prague.

== Demographics ==
Historical population
Year	Pop.	±%
1869	286	—
1880	294	+2.8%
1890	301	+2.4%
1900	313	+4.0%
1910	233	−25.6%
1921	219	−6.0%
1930	214	−2.3%
1950	136	−36.4%
1961	170	+25.0%
1970	122	−28.2%
1980	90	−26.2%
1991	62	−31.1%
2001	51	−17.7%
2011	58	+13.7%
2021	63	+8.6%
Source: Censuses
