= Úsobrno =

- Municipality
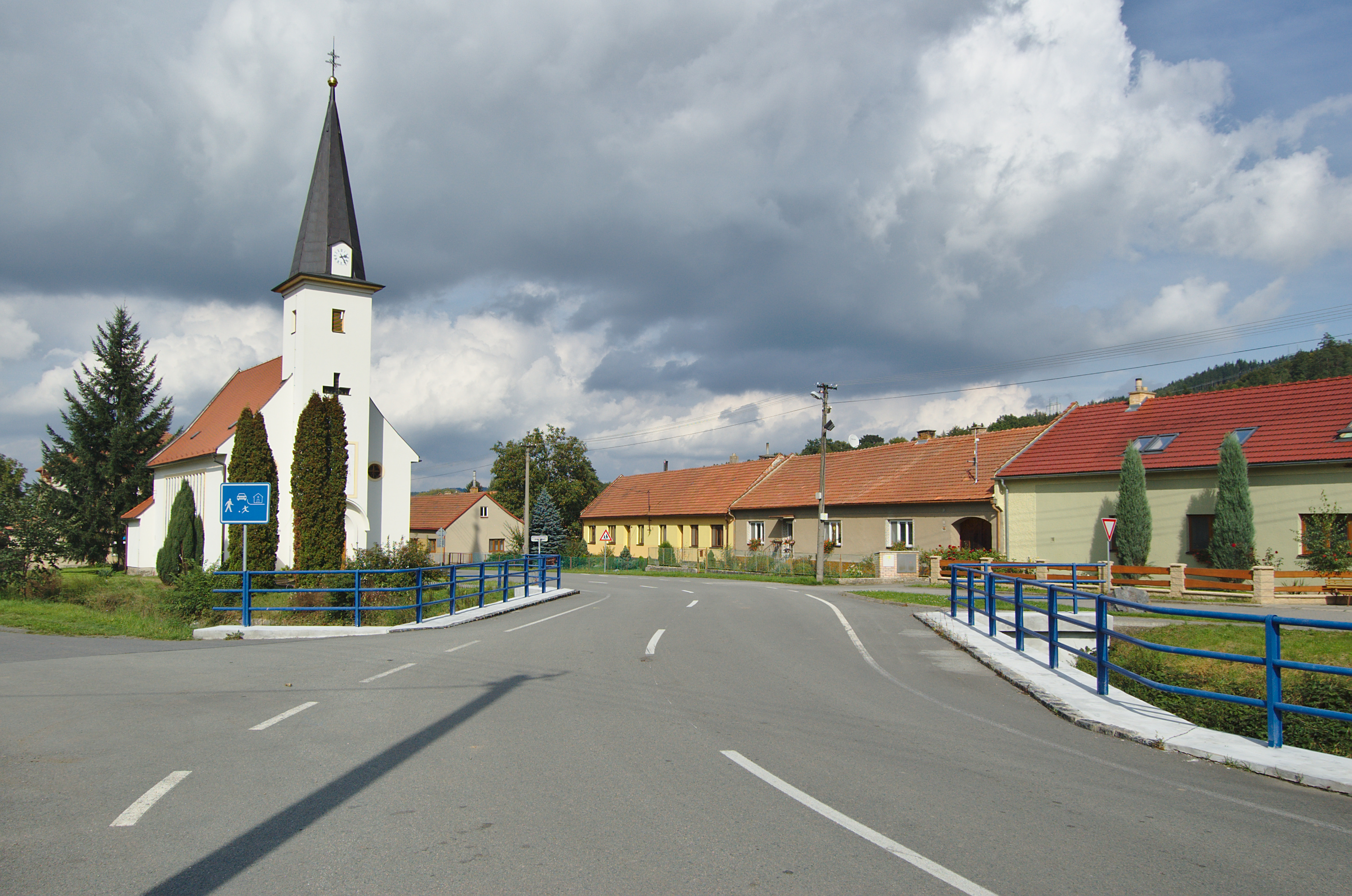
- Church of Saints Cyril and Methodius

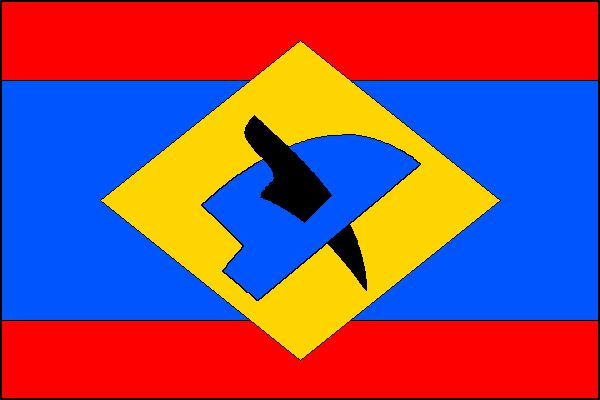
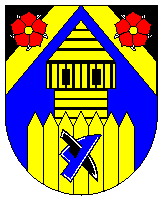
- Flag Coat of arms

- Location in the Czech Republic
- Coordinates: 49°35′20″N 16°45′47″E
- Country: Czech Republic
- Region: South Moravian
- District: Blansko
- First mentioned: 1073

Area
  - Total: 7.79 km^{2} (3.01 sq mi)
- Elevation: 415 m (1,362 ft)

Population (2026-01-01)
  - Total: 412
  - Density: 52.9/km^{2} (137/sq mi)
- Time zone: UTC+1 (CET)
  - Summer (DST): UTC+2 (CEST)
- Postal code: 679 39
- Website: www.usobrno.eu

Úsobrno (German: Hausbrunn) is a municipality and village in Blansko District in the South Moravian Region of the Czech Republic. It has about 400 inhabitants.

== Demographics ==
Historical population
Year	Pop.	±%
1869	653	—
1880	650	−0.5%
1890	599	−7.8%
1900	615	+2.7%
1910	670	+8.9%
1921	825	+23.1%
1930	835	+1.2%
1950	649	−22.3%
1961	652	+0.5%
1970	629	−3.5%
1980	586	−6.8%
1991	501	−14.5%
2001	467	−6.8%
2011	424	−9.2%
2021	432	+1.9%
Source: Censuses
