= Velenov =

- Municipality
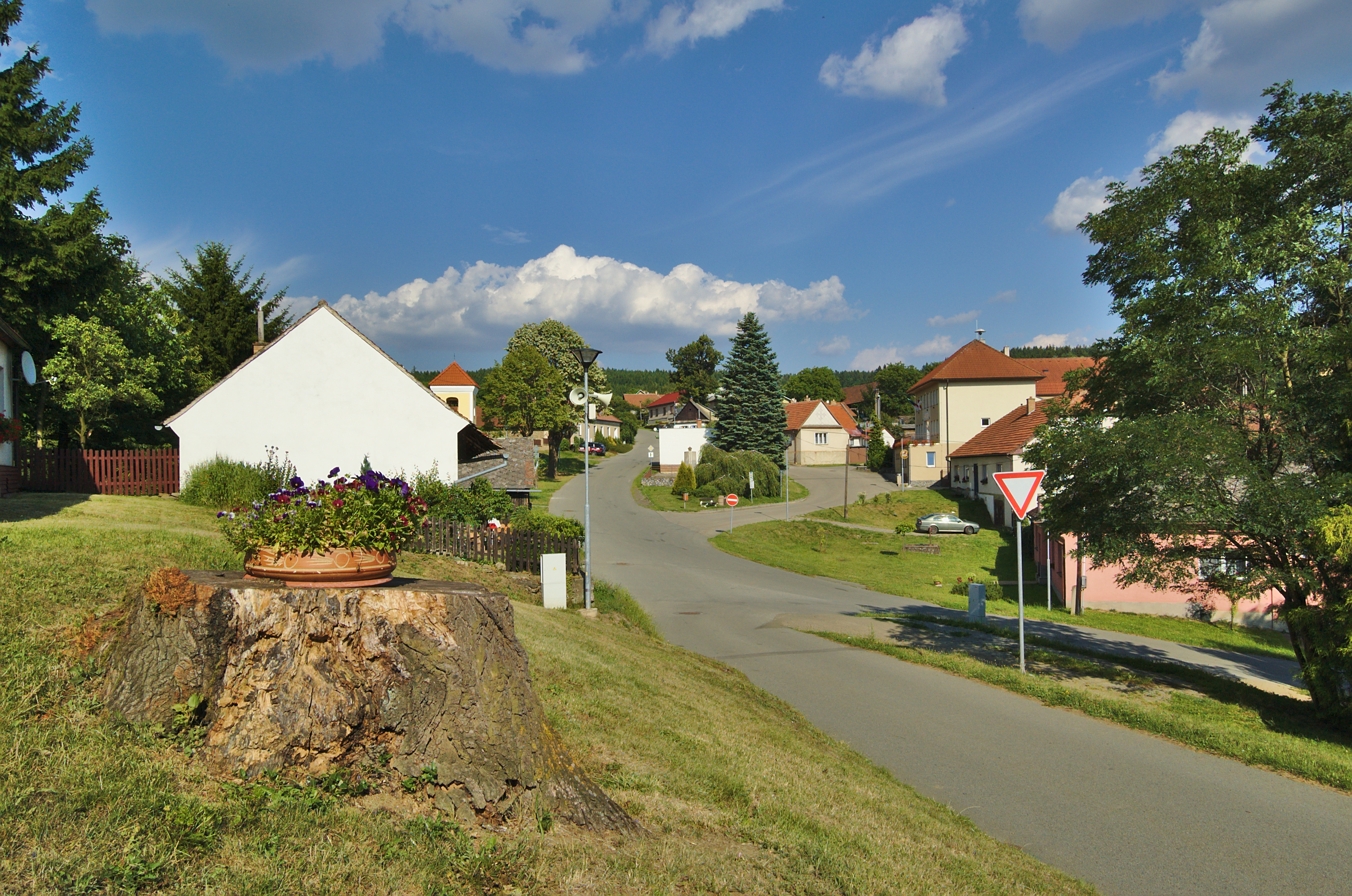
- Centre of Velenov

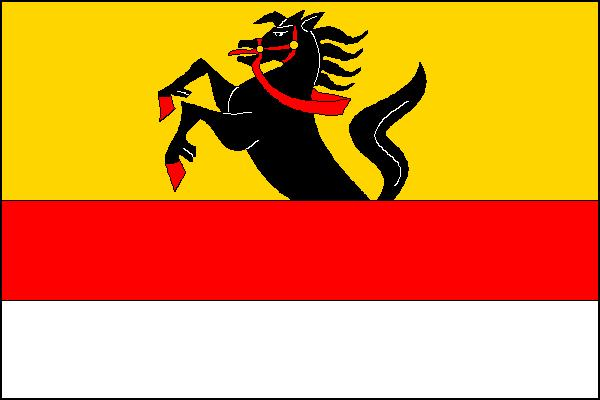
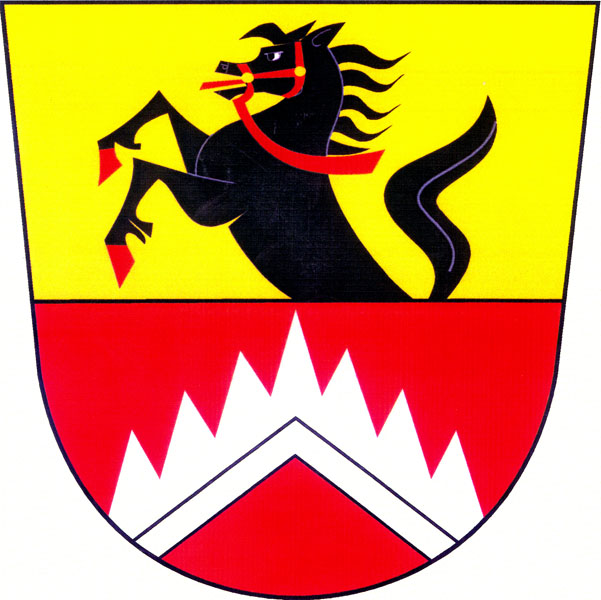
- Flag Coat of arms

- Location in the Czech Republic
- Coordinates: 49°29′13″N 16°43′58″E
- Country: Czech Republic
- Region: South Moravian
- District: Blansko
- First mentioned: 1378

Area
  - Total: 7.51 km^{2} (2.90 sq mi)
- Elevation: 560 m (1,840 ft)

Population (2026-01-01)
  - Total: 267
  - Density: 35.6/km^{2} (92.1/sq mi)
- Time zone: UTC+1 (CET)
  - Summer (DST): UTC+2 (CEST)
- Postal code: 680 01
- Website: www.velenov.cz

Velenov is a municipality and village in Blansko District in the South Moravian Region of the Czech Republic. It has about 300 inhabitants.

Velenov lies approximately 15 kilometres (9 mi) north-east of Blansko, 33 km (21 mi) north of Brno, and 180 km (110 mi) east of Prague.

== Demographics ==
Historical population
Year	Pop.	±%
1869	271	—
1880	330	+21.8%
1890	346	+4.8%
1900	338	−2.3%
1910	368	+8.9%
1921	382	+3.8%
1930	361	−5.5%
1950	296	−18.0%
1961	326	+10.1%
1970	292	−10.4%
1980	242	−17.1%
1991	206	−14.9%
2001	191	−7.3%
2011	216	+13.1%
2021	249	+15.3%
Source: Censuses
