= Míchov =

- Municipality
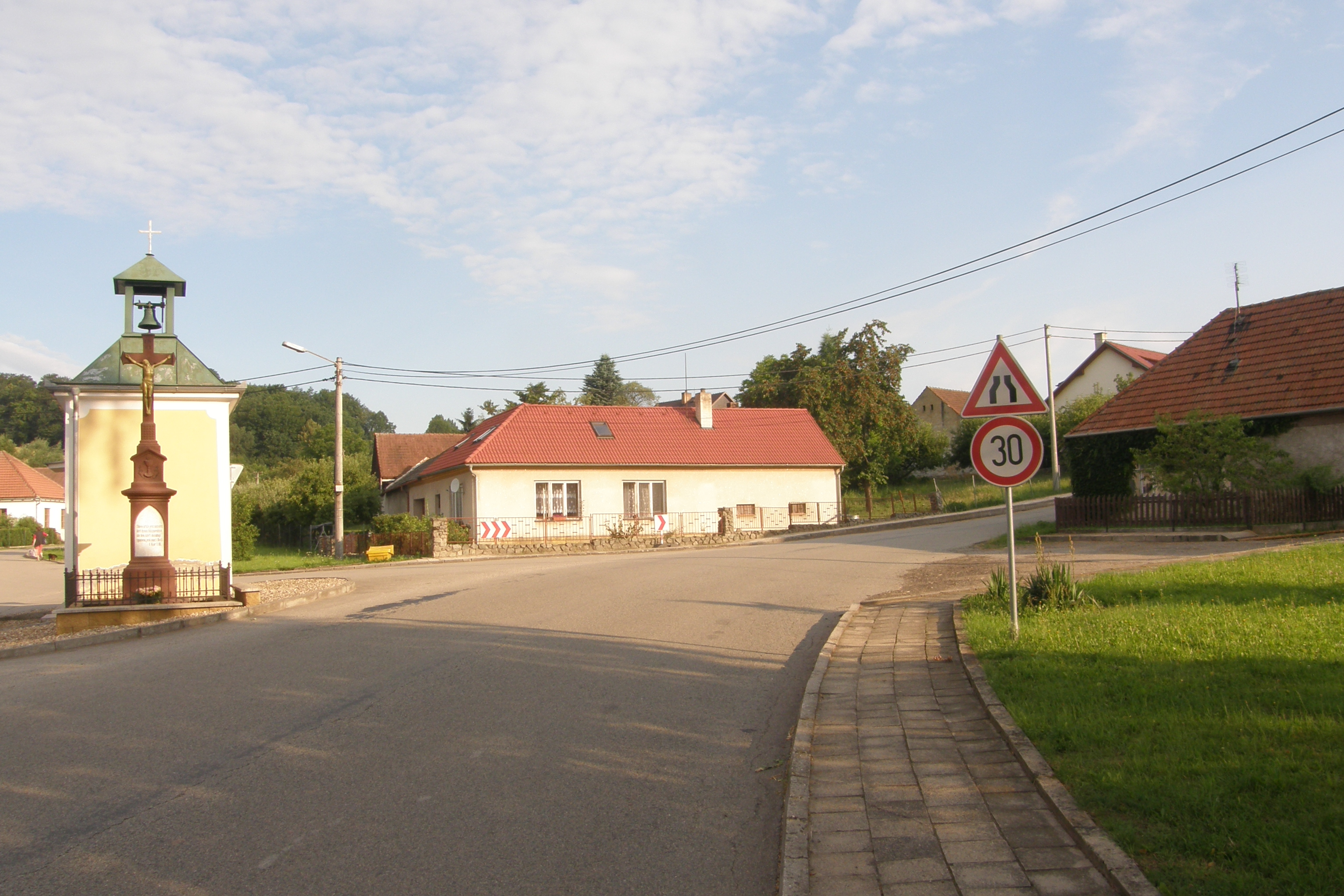
- Centre of Míchov with a chapel

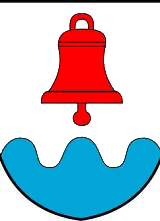
- Coat of arms

- Location in the Czech Republic
- Coordinates: 49°31′27″N 16°36′57″E
- Country: Czech Republic
- Region: South Moravian
- District: Blansko
- First mentioned: 1201

Area
  - Total: 3.01 km^{2} (1.16 sq mi)
- Elevation: 356 m (1,168 ft)

Population (2026-01-01)
  - Total: 170
  - Density: 56/km^{2} (150/sq mi)
- Time zone: UTC+1 (CET)
  - Summer (DST): UTC+2 (CEST)
- Postal code: 679 61
- Website: www.obecmichov.cz

Míchov is a municipality and village in Blansko District in the South Moravian Region of the Czech Republic. It has about 200 inhabitants.

Míchov lies approximately 19 kilometres (12 mi) north of Blansko, 37 km (23 mi) north of Brno, and 169 km (105 mi) east of Prague.

== Demographics ==
Historical population
Year	Pop.	±%
1869	194	—
1880	213	+9.8%
1890	200	−6.1%
1900	232	+16.0%
1910	249	+7.3%
1921	223	−10.4%
1930	224	+0.4%
1950	178	−20.5%
1961	174	−2.2%
1970	167	−4.0%
1980	144	−13.8%
1991	134	−6.9%
2001	150	+11.9%
2011	162	+8.0%
2021	173	+6.8%
Source: Censuses
