= Zbraslavec =

- Municipality
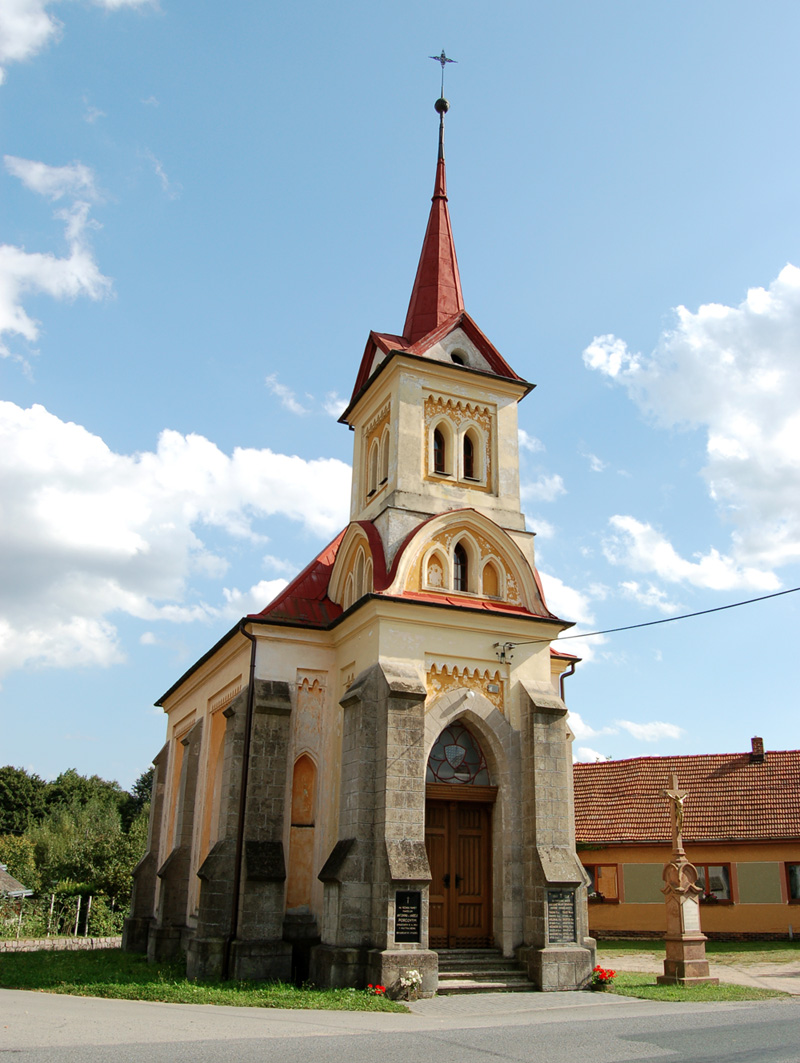
- Chapel of Our Lady of Mount Carmel

- Flag Coat of arms

- Location in the Czech Republic
- Coordinates: 49°29′2″N 16°31′42″E
- Country: Czech Republic
- Region: South Moravian
- District: Blansko
- First mentioned: 1374

Area
  - Total: 2.62 km^{2} (1.01 sq mi)
- Elevation: 371 m (1,217 ft)

Population (2026-01-01)
  - Total: 238
  - Density: 90.8/km^{2} (235/sq mi)
- Time zone: UTC+1 (CET)
  - Summer (DST): UTC+2 (CEST)
- Postal code: 679 72
- Website: www.zbraslavec.cz

Zbraslavec is a municipality and village in Blansko District in the South Moravian Region of the Czech Republic. It has about 200 inhabitants.

Zbraslavec lies approximately 16 kilometres (10 mi) north-west of Blansko, 33 km (21 mi) north of Brno, and 166 km (103 mi) south-east of Prague.

== Demographics ==
Historical population
Year	Pop.	±%
1869	252	—
1880	332	+31.7%
1890	310	−6.6%
1900	322	+3.9%
1910	340	+5.6%
1921	295	−13.2%
1930	257	−12.9%
1950	217	−15.6%
1961	232	+6.9%
1970	235	+1.3%
1980	231	−1.7%
1991	215	−6.9%
2001	182	−15.3%
2011	197	+8.2%
2021	213	+8.1%
Source: Censuses
