= Benešov (Blansko District) =

- Municipality
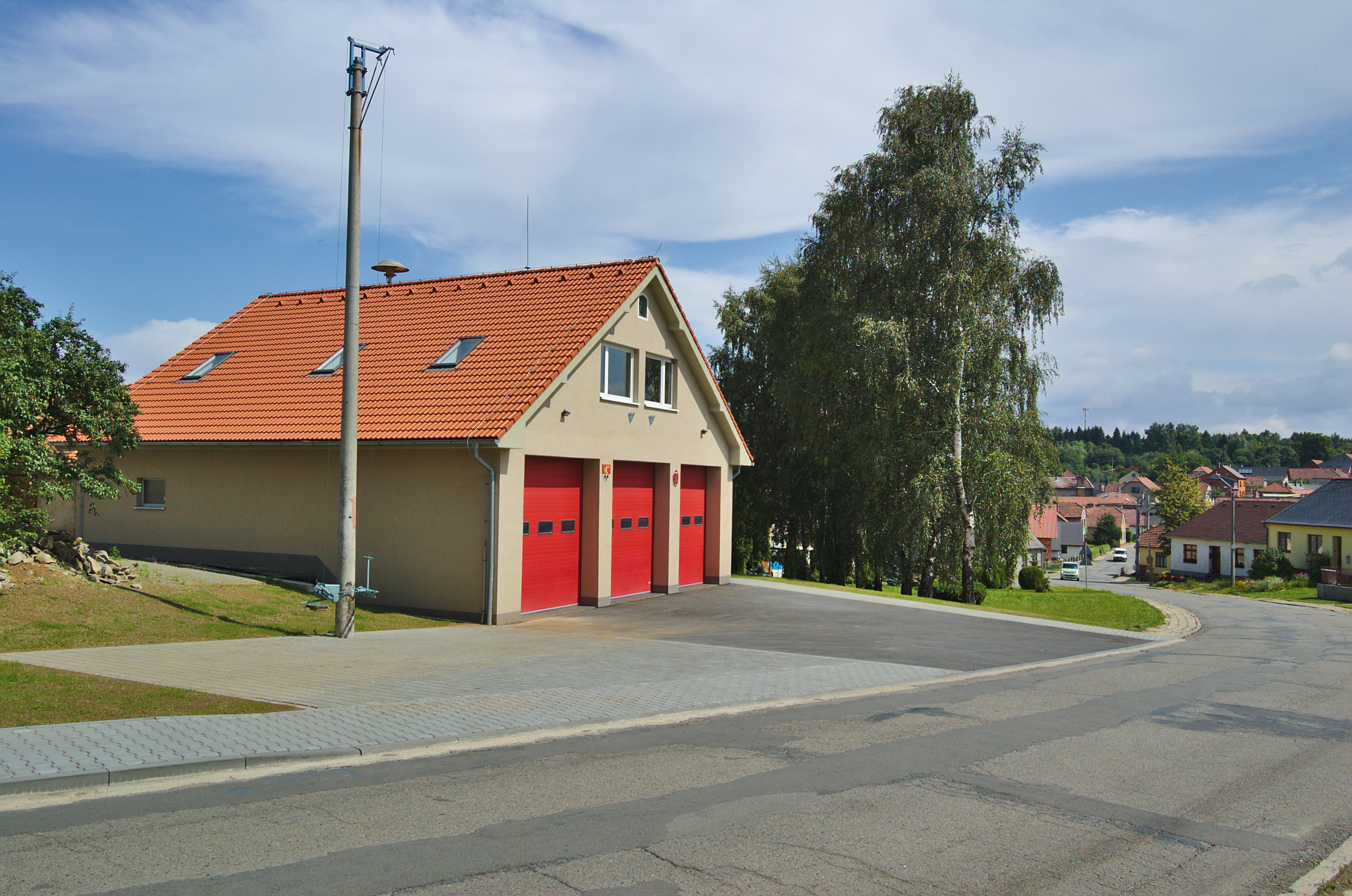
- Centre of Benešov

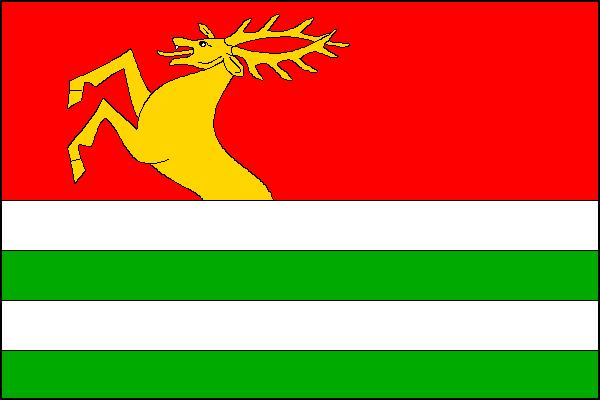
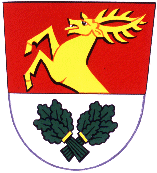
- Flag Coat of arms

- Location in the Czech Republic
- Coordinates: 49°30′34″N 16°46′14″E
- Country: Czech Republic
- Region: South Moravian
- District: Blansko
- First mentioned: 1362

Area
  - Total: 13.63 km^{2} (5.26 sq mi)
- Elevation: 694 m (2,277 ft)

Population (2026-01-01)
  - Total: 676
  - Density: 49.6/km^{2} (128/sq mi)
- Time zone: UTC+1 (CET)
  - Summer (DST): UTC+2 (CEST)
- Postal code: 679 53
- Website: www.benesov-u-boskovic.cz

Benešov is a municipality and village in Blansko District in the South Moravian Region of the Czech Republic. It has about 700 inhabitants.

Benešov lies approximately 20 kilometres (12 mi) north-east of Blansko, 38 km (24 mi) north of Brno, and 182 km (113 mi) east of Prague.

== Demographics ==
Historical population
Year	Pop.	±%
1869	810	—
1880	795	−1.9%
1890	825	+3.8%
1900	850	+3.0%
1910	923	+8.6%
1921	873	−5.4%
1930	918	+5.2%
1950	837	−8.8%
1961	872	+4.2%
1970	805	−7.7%
1980	710	−11.8%
1991	622	−12.4%
2001	580	−6.8%
2011	651	+12.2%
2021	629	−3.4%
Source: Censuses
