= Rozsíčka =

- Municipality
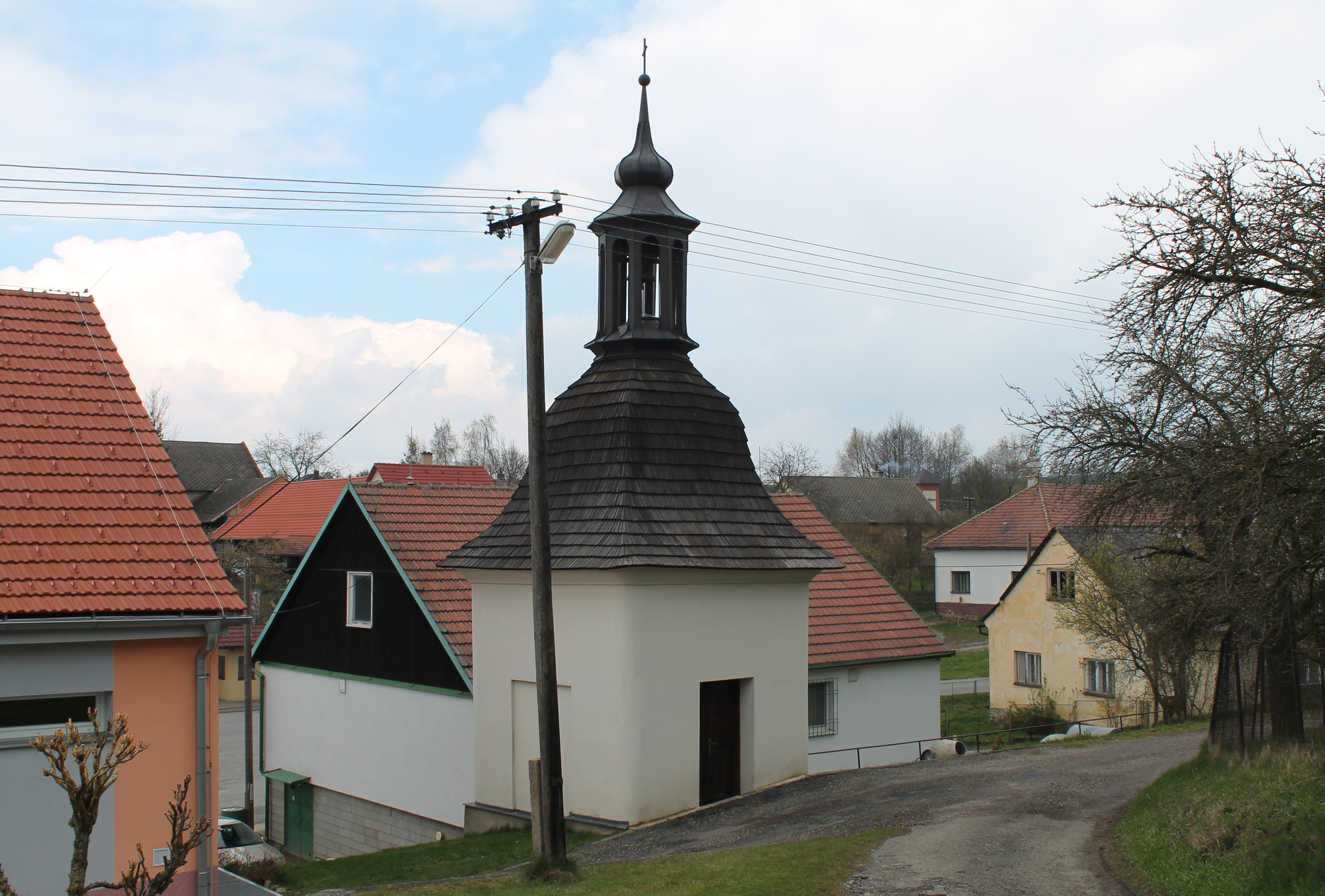
- Belfry

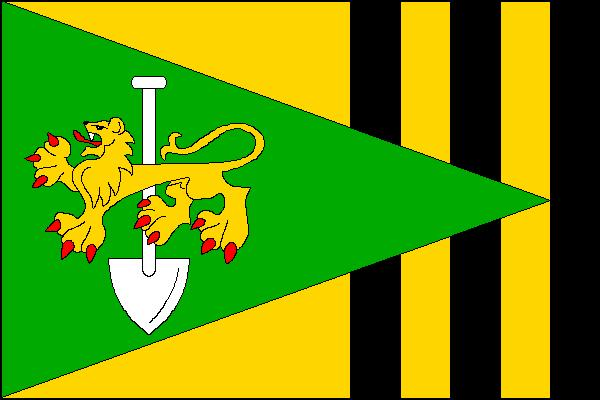
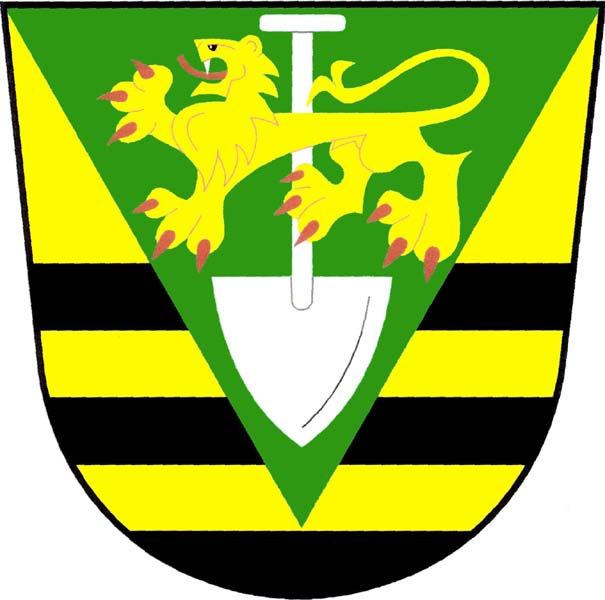
- Flag Coat of arms

- Location in the Czech Republic
- Coordinates: 49°33′8″N 16°28′1″E
- Country: Czech Republic
- Region: South Moravian
- District: Blansko
- First mentioned: 1374

Area
  - Total: 4.01 km^{2} (1.55 sq mi)
- Elevation: 607 m (1,991 ft)

Population (2026-01-01)
  - Total: 141
  - Density: 35.2/km^{2} (91.1/sq mi)
- Time zone: UTC+1 (CET)
  - Summer (DST): UTC+2 (CEST)
- Postal code: 679 33
- Website: rozsicka.cz

Rozsíčka is a municipality and village in Blansko District in the South Moravian Region of the Czech Republic. It has about 100 inhabitants.

Rozsíčka lies approximately 24 kilometres (15 mi) north-west of Blansko, 40 km (25 mi) north of Brno, and 159 km (99 mi) east of Prague.

== Demographics ==
Historical population
Year	Pop.	±%
1869	294	—
1880	302	+2.7%
1890	299	−1.0%
1900	331	+10.7%
1910	321	−3.0%
1921	296	−7.8%
1930	257	−13.2%
1950	234	−8.9%
1961	215	−8.1%
1970	172	−20.0%
1980	198	+15.1%
1991	169	−14.6%
2001	163	−3.6%
2011	155	−4.9%
2021	131	−15.5%
Source: Censuses
