= Horní Smržov =

- Municipality
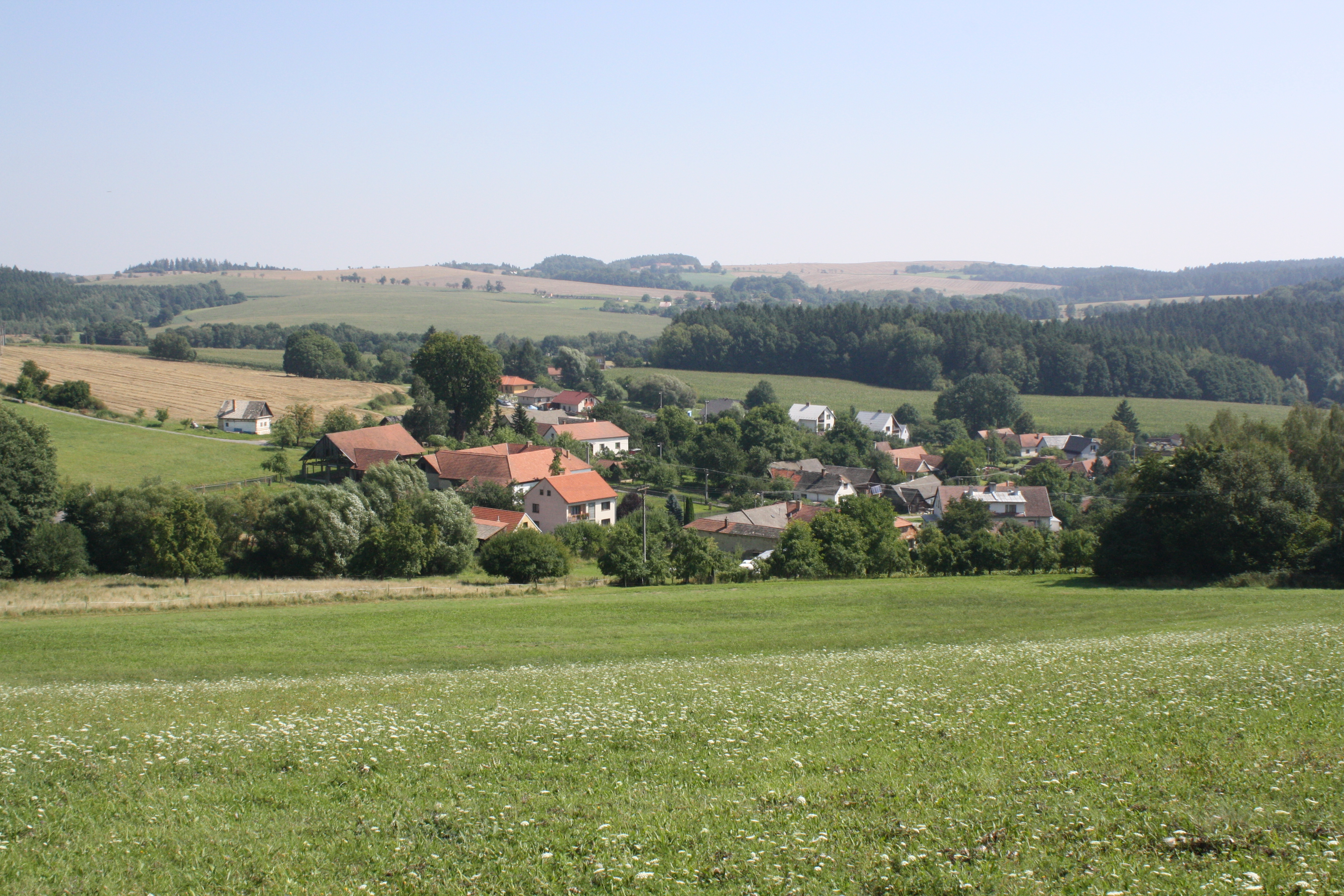
- View from the northeast

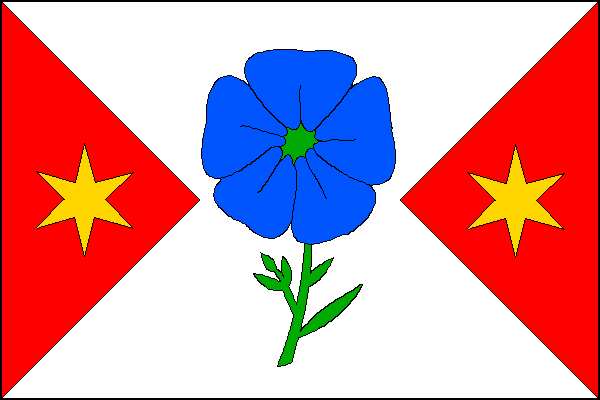
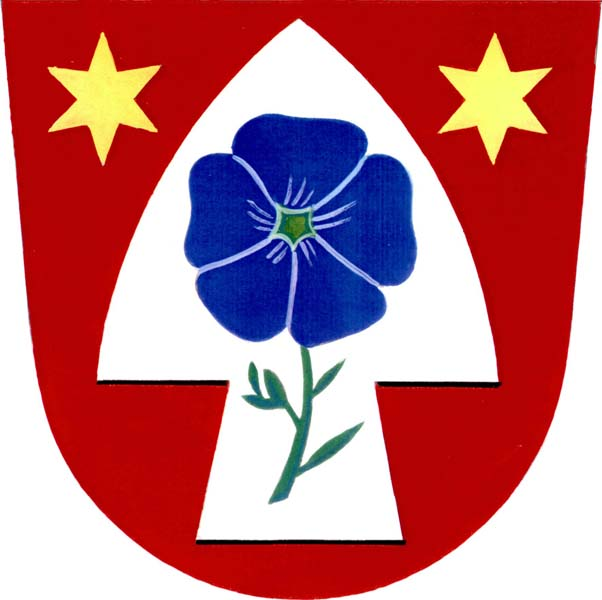
- Flag Coat of arms

- Location in the Czech Republic
- Coordinates: 49°37′6″N 16°34′37″E
- Country: Czech Republic
- Region: South Moravian
- District: Blansko
- First mentioned: 1317

Area
  - Total: 3.91 km^{2} (1.51 sq mi)
- Elevation: 455 m (1,493 ft)

Population (2026-01-01)
  - Total: 123
  - Density: 31.5/km^{2} (81.5/sq mi)
- Time zone: UTC+1 (CET)
  - Summer (DST): UTC+2 (CEST)
- Postal code: 679 61
- Website: hornismrzov.cz

Horní Smržov is a municipality and village in Blansko District in the South Moravian Region of the Czech Republic. It has about 100 inhabitants.

Horní Smržov lies approximately 28 kilometres (17 mi) north of Blansko, 47 km (29 mi) north of Brno, and 164 km (102 mi) east of Prague.

== Demographics ==
Historical population
Year	Pop.	±%
1869	177	—
1880	185	+4.5%
1890	168	−9.2%
1900	192	+14.3%
1910	210	+9.4%
1921	192	−8.6%
1930	174	−9.4%
1950	105	−39.7%
1961	122	+16.2%
1970	124	+1.6%
1980	115	−7.3%
1991	140	+21.7%
2001	137	−2.1%
2011	118	−13.9%
2021	122	+3.4%
Source: Censuses
