= Chrudichromy =

- Municipality
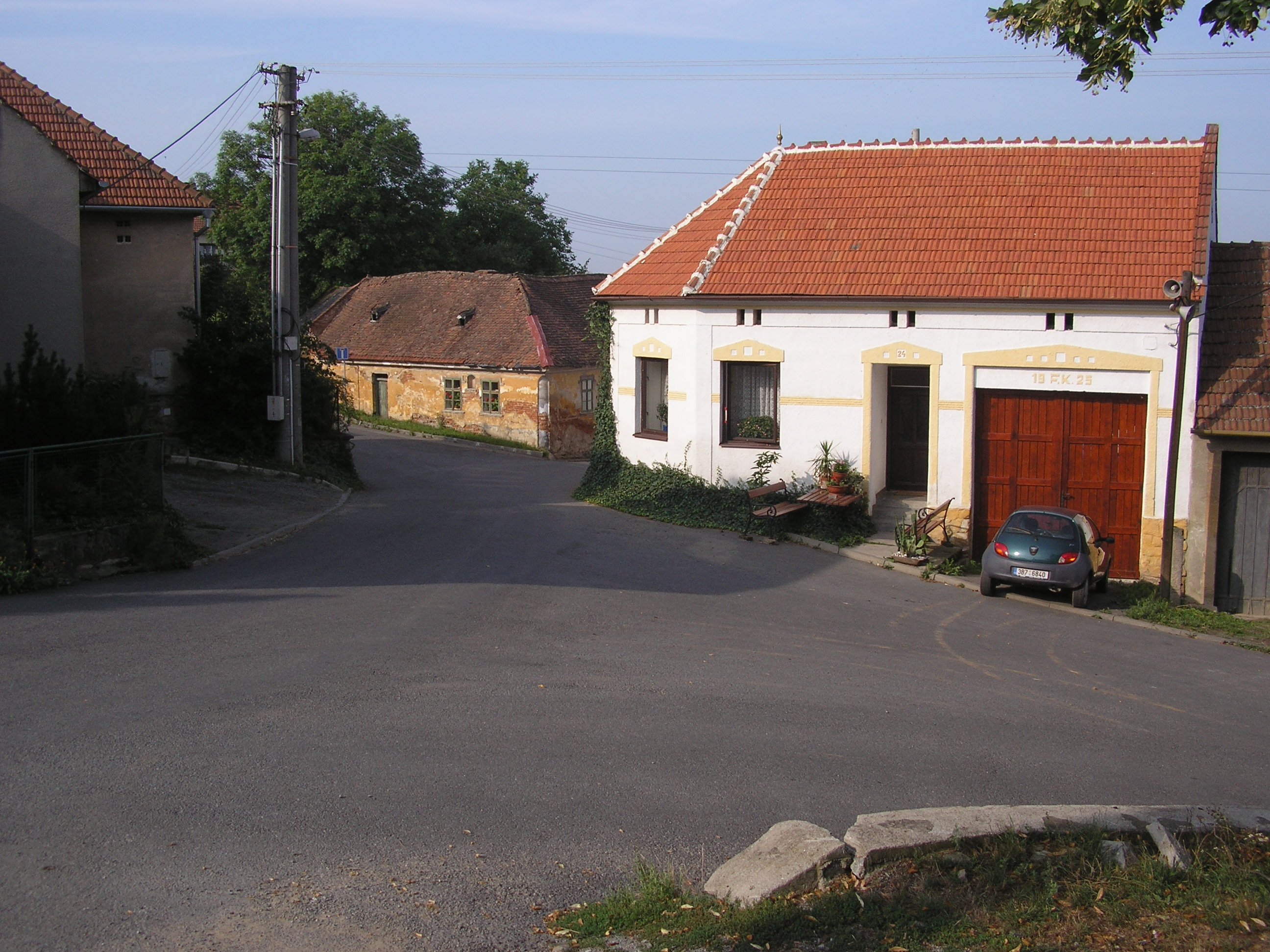
- Crossroads

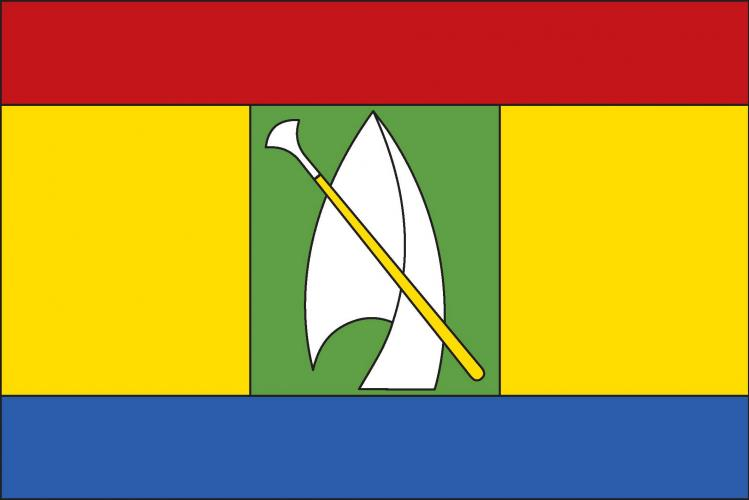
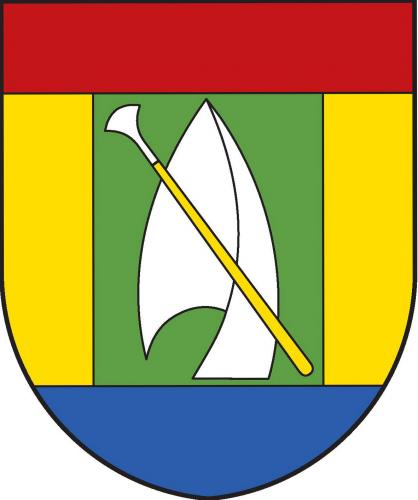
- Flag Coat of arms

- Location in the Czech Republic
- Coordinates: 49°30′11″N 16°37′41″E
- Country: Czech Republic
- Region: South Moravian
- District: Blansko
- First mentioned: 1386

Area
  - Total: 2.67 km^{2} (1.03 sq mi)
- Elevation: 330 m (1,080 ft)

Population (2026-01-01)
  - Total: 214
  - Density: 80.1/km^{2} (208/sq mi)
- Time zone: UTC+1 (CET)
  - Summer (DST): UTC+2 (CEST)
- Postal code: 680 01
- Website: www.chrudichromy.cz

Chrudichromy is a municipality and village in Blansko District in the South Moravian Region of the Czech Republic. It has about 200 inhabitants.

Chrudichromy lies approximately 16 kilometres (10 mi) north of Blansko, 35 km (22 mi) north of Brno, and 172 km (107 mi) east of Prague.

== Demographics ==
Historical population
Year	Pop.	±%
1869	289	—
1880	334	+15.6%
1890	332	−0.6%
1900	359	+8.1%
1910	341	−5.0%
1921	380	+11.4%
1930	378	−0.5%
1950	282	−25.4%
1961	301	+6.7%
1970	239	−20.6%
1980	211	−11.7%
1991	170	−19.4%
2001	185	+8.8%
2011	182	−1.6%
2021	211	+15.9%
Source: Censuses
