= Křtěnov =

- Municipality
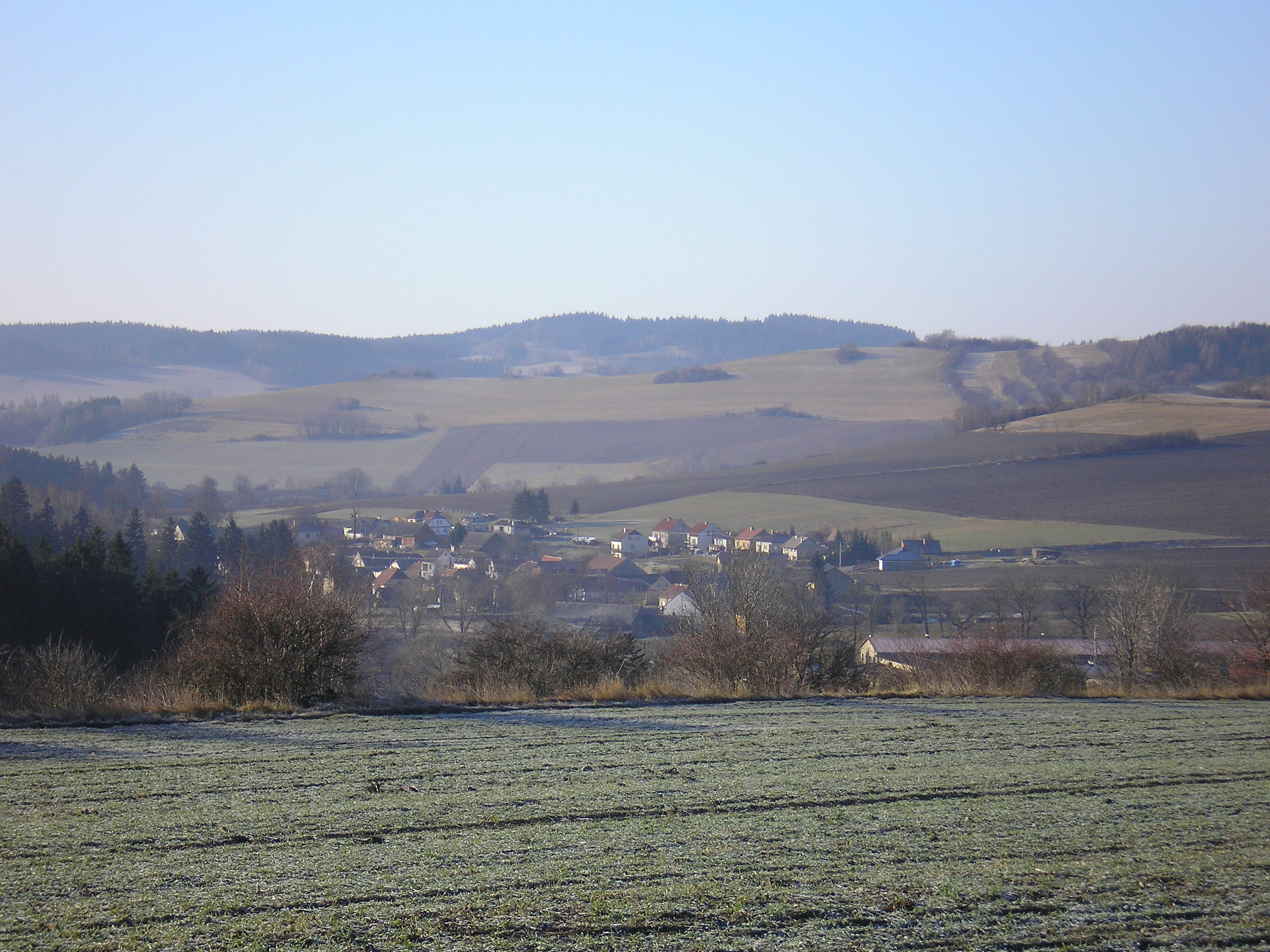
- General view

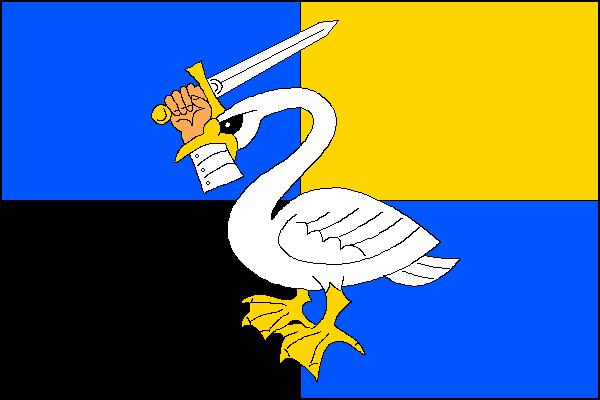
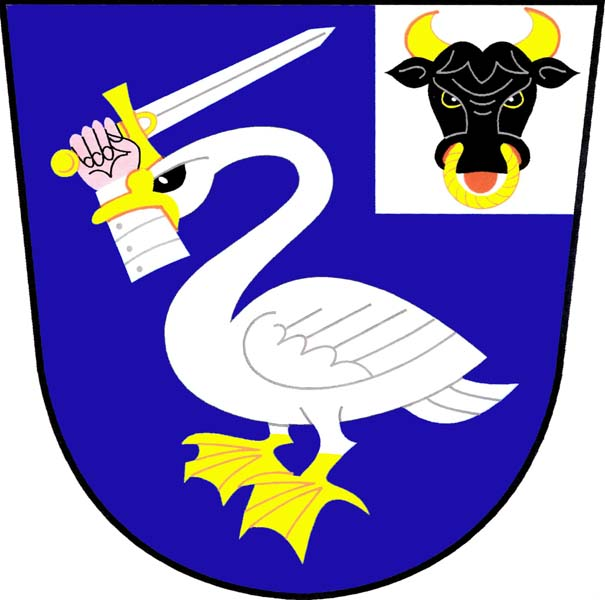
- Flag Coat of arms

- Location in the Czech Republic
- Coordinates: 49°32′42″N 16°25′9″E
- Country: Czech Republic
- Region: South Moravian
- District: Blansko
- First mentioned: 1447

Area
  - Total: 2.82 km^{2} (1.09 sq mi)
- Elevation: 527 m (1,729 ft)

Population (2026-01-01)
  - Total: 200
  - Density: 71/km^{2} (180/sq mi)
- Time zone: UTC+1 (CET)
  - Summer (DST): UTC+2 (CEST)
- Postal code: 679 74
- Website: www.krtenov.cz

Křtěnov is a municipality and village in Blansko District in the South Moravian Region of the Czech Republic. It has about 200 inhabitants.

Křtěnov lies approximately 26 kilometres (16 mi) north-west of Blansko, 41 km (25 mi) north of Brno, and 156 km (97 mi) south-east of Prague.

== Demographics ==
Historical population
Year	Pop.	±%
1869	277	—
1880	288	+4.0%
1890	305	+5.9%
1900	299	−2.0%
1910	292	−2.3%
1921	308	+5.5%
1930	260	−15.6%
1950	218	−16.2%
1961	209	−4.1%
1970	217	+3.8%
1980	180	−17.1%
1991	205	+13.9%
2001	211	+2.9%
2011	225	+6.6%
2021	196	−12.9%
Source: Censuses
