= Pamětice =

- Municipality
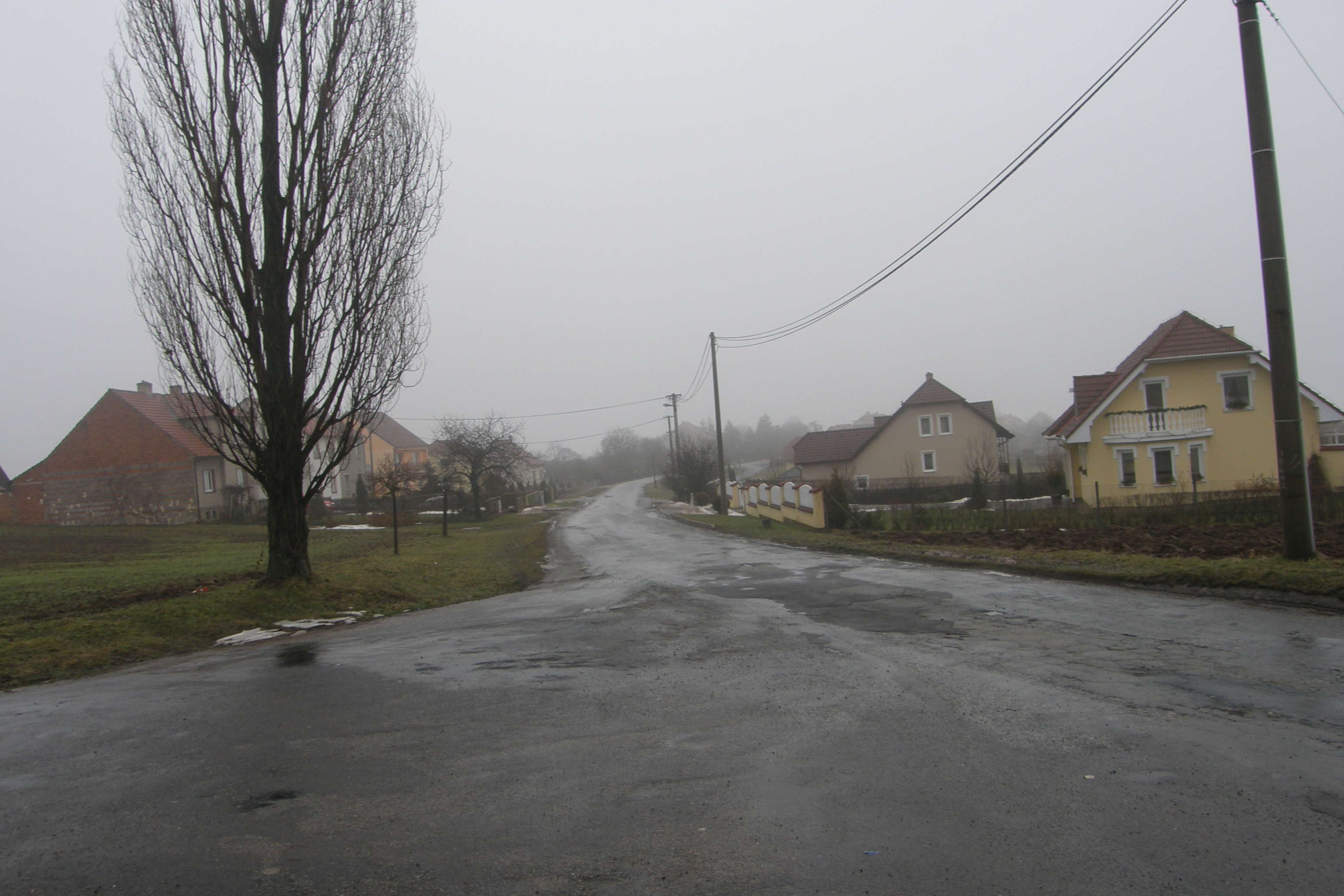
- Crossroads in the centre of Pamětice

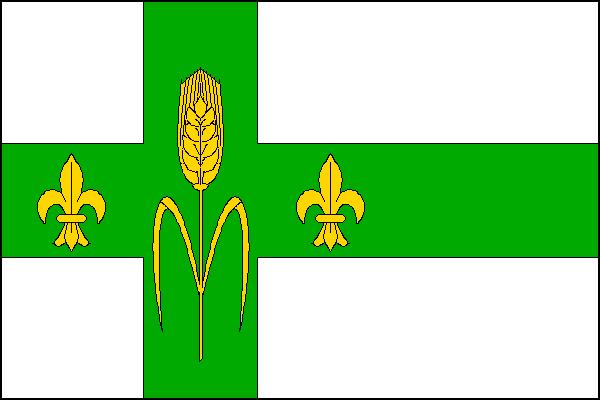
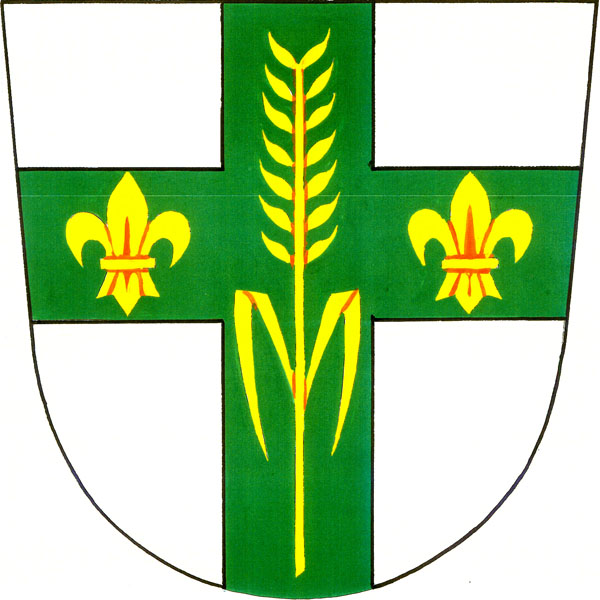
- Flag Coat of arms

- Location in the Czech Republic
- Coordinates: 49°32′58″N 16°38′40″E
- Country: Czech Republic
- Region: South Moravian
- District: Blansko
- First mentioned: 1145

Area
  - Total: 3.51 km^{2} (1.36 sq mi)
- Elevation: 458 m (1,503 ft)

Population (2026-01-01)
  - Total: 260
  - Density: 74/km^{2} (190/sq mi)
- Time zone: UTC+1 (CET)
  - Summer (DST): UTC+2 (CEST)
- Postal code: 679 61
- Website: www.pametice.cz

Pamětice is a municipality and village in Blansko District in the South Moravian Region of the Czech Republic. It has about 300 inhabitants.

Pamětice lies approximately 21 kilometres (13 mi) north of Blansko, 39 km (24 mi) north of Brno, and 171 km (106 mi) east of Prague.

== Demographics ==
Historical population
Year	Pop.	±%
1869	248	—
1880	256	+3.2%
1890	240	−6.2%
1900	258	+7.5%
1910	270	+4.7%
1921	280	+3.7%
1930	288	+2.9%
1950	240	−16.7%
1961	255	+6.2%
1970	223	−12.5%
1980	216	−3.1%
1991	223	+3.2%
2001	210	−5.8%
2011	238	+13.3%
2021	255	+7.1%
Source: Censuses
