= Štěchov =

- Municipality
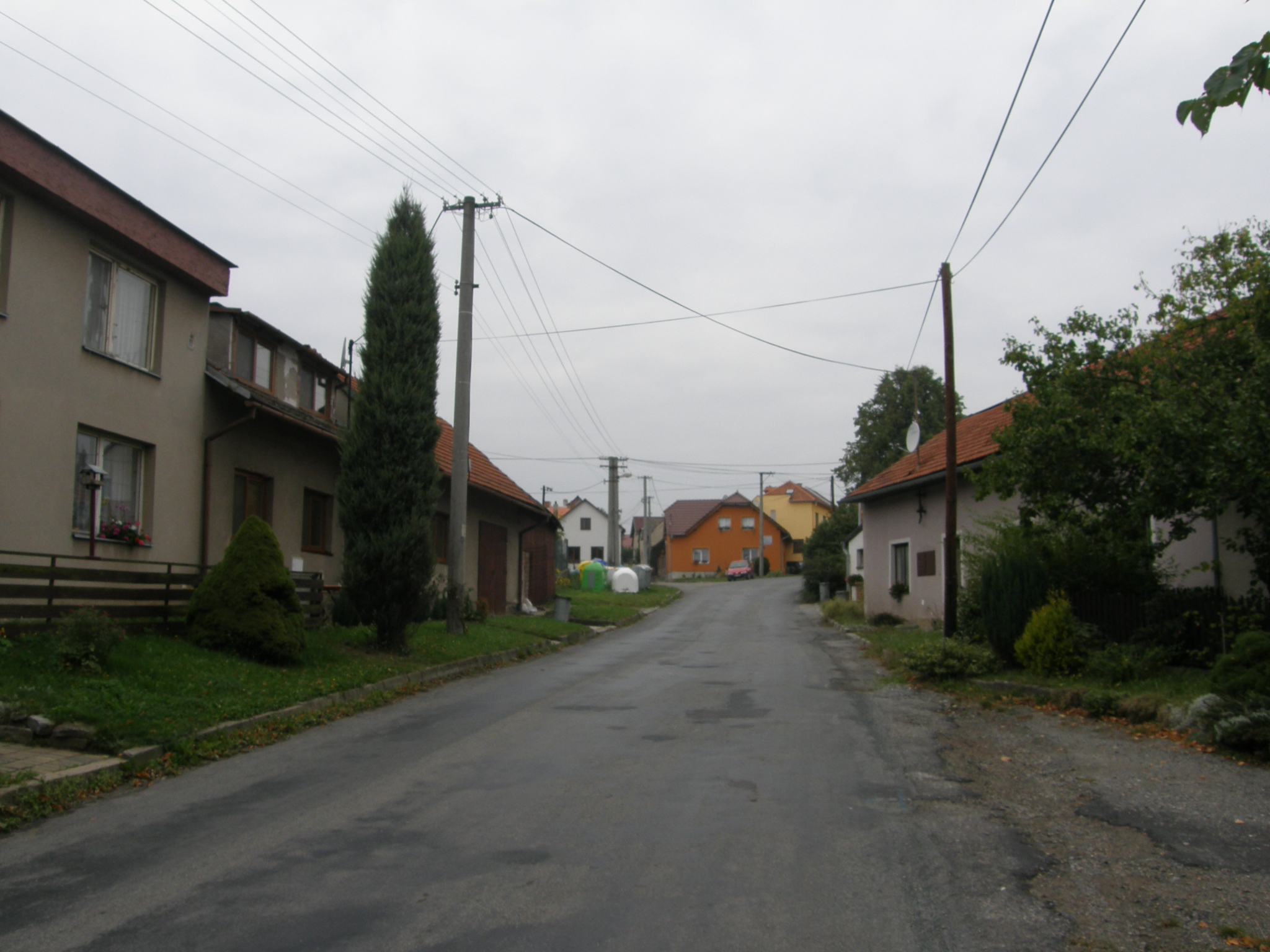
- A street in Štěchov

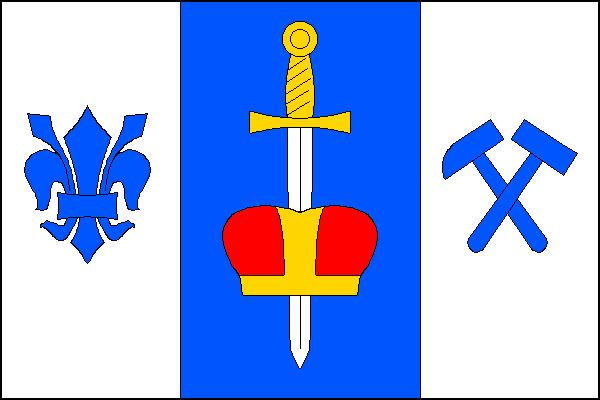
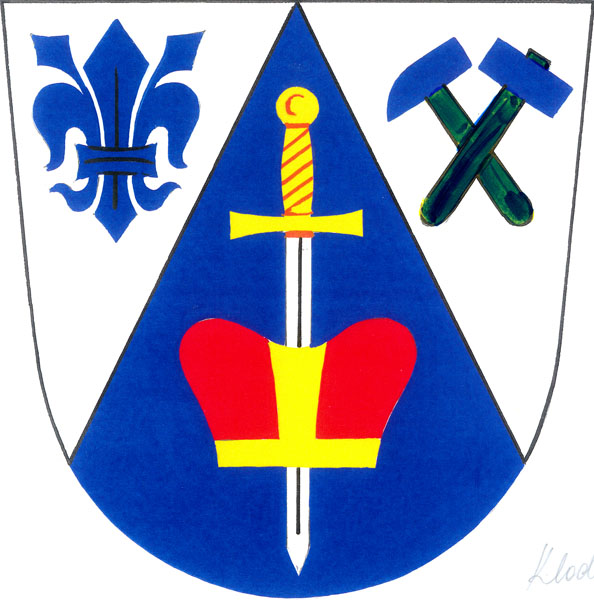
- Flag Coat of arms

- Location in the Czech Republic
- Coordinates: 49°27′8″N 16°30′22″E
- Country: Czech Republic
- Region: South Moravian
- District: Blansko
- First mentioned: 1385

Area
  - Total: 1.68 km^{2} (0.65 sq mi)
- Elevation: 479 m (1,572 ft)

Population (2026-01-01)
  - Total: 199
  - Density: 118/km^{2} (307/sq mi)
- Time zone: UTC+1 (CET)
  - Summer (DST): UTC+2 (CEST)
- Postal code: 679 71
- Website: www.stechov.cz

Štěchov is a municipality and village in Blansko District in the South Moravian Region of the Czech Republic. It has about 200 inhabitants.

Štěchov lies approximately 15 kilometres (9 mi) north-west of Blansko, 30 km (19 mi) north of Brno, and 166 km (103 mi) south-east of Prague.

== Administrative division ==
Štěchov consists of two municipal parts (in brackets population according to the 2021 census):

- Štěchov (122)
- Lačnov (64)

== Demographics ==
Historical population
Year	Pop.	±%
1869	316	—
1880	304	−3.8%
1890	309	+1.6%
1900	327	+5.8%
1910	304	−7.0%
1921	312	+2.6%
1930	324	+3.8%
1950	254	−21.6%
1961	282	+11.0%
1970	235	−16.7%
1980	196	−16.6%
1991	166	−15.3%
2001	169	+1.8%
2011	166	−1.8%
2021	186	+12.0%
Source: Censuses
