= Blansko District =

Blansko District Okres Blansko
- District
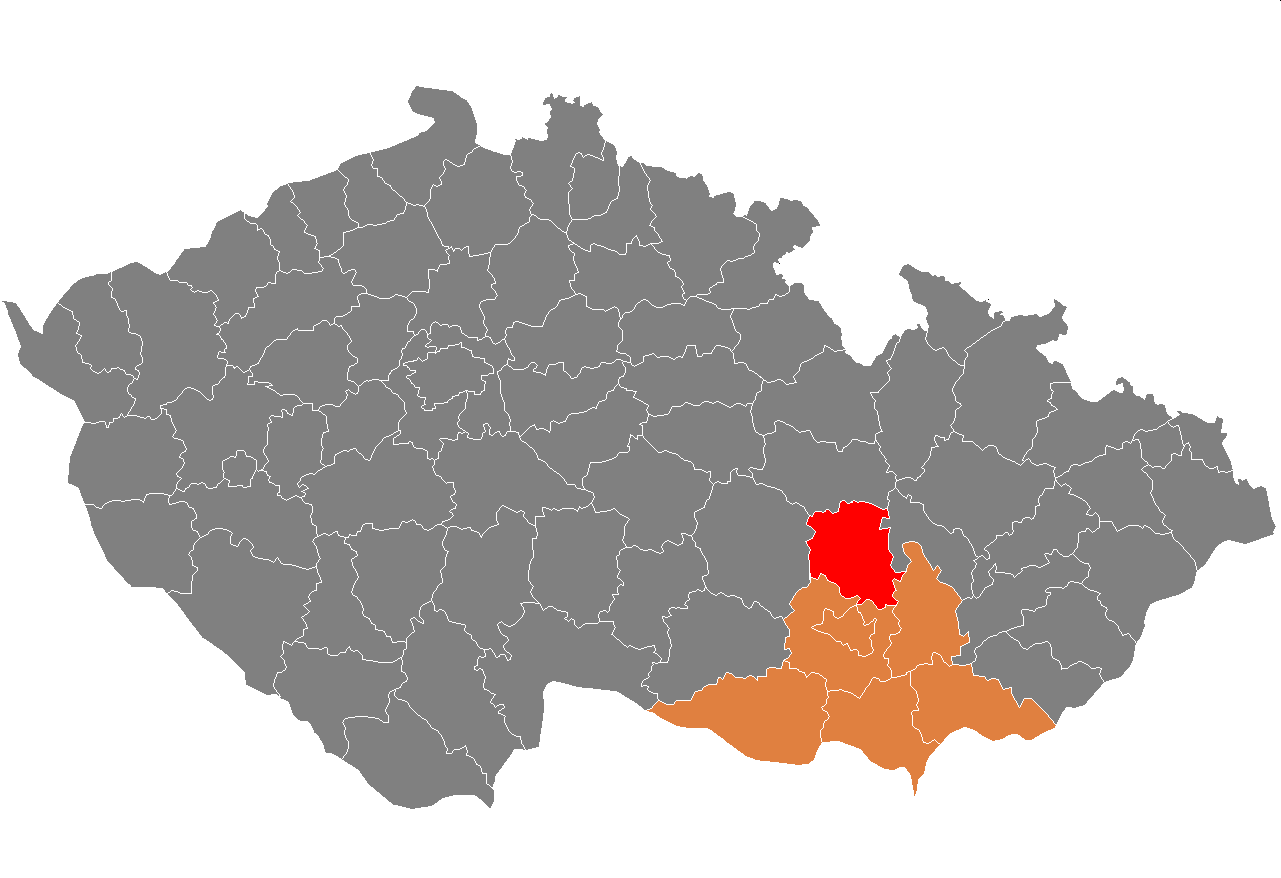
- Location in the South Moravian Region within the Czech Republic
- Coordinates: 49°28′N 16°38′E
- Country: Czech Republic
- Region: South Moravian
- Capital: Blansko

Area
  - Total: 862.43 km^{2} (332.99 sq mi)

Population (2026)
  - Total: 111,052
  - Density: 128.77/km^{2} (333.50/sq mi)
- Time zone: UTC+1 (CET)
  - Summer (DST): UTC+2 (CEST)
- Municipalities: 116
- * Towns: 8
- * Market towns: 9

Blansko District (Czech: okres Blansko) is a district in the South Moravian Region of the Czech Republic. Its capital is the town of Blansko.

== Administrative division ==
Blansko District is divided into two administrative districts of municipalities with extended competence: Blansko and Boskovice.

=== List of municipalities ===
Towns are marked in bold and market towns in italics:

Adamov - Bedřichov - Benešov - Blansko - Borotín - Bořitov - Boskovice - Brťov-Jeneč - Bukovina - Bukovinka - Býkovice - Černá Hora - Černovice - Cetkovice - Chrudichromy - Crhov - Deštná - Dlouhá Lhota - Doubravice nad Svitavou - Drnovice - Habrůvka - Hodonín - Holštejn - Horní Poříčí - Horní Smržov - Jabloňany - Jedovnice - Kněževes - Knínice - Kořenec - Kotvrdovice - Kozárov - Krasová - Křetín - Krhov - Křtěnov - Křtiny - Kulířov - Kunčina Ves - Kunice - Kuničky - Kunštát - Lazinov - Lažany - Letovice - Lhota Rapotina - Lhota u Lysic - Lhota u Olešnice - Lipovec - Lipůvka - Louka - Lubě - Ludíkov - Lysice - Makov - Malá Lhota - Malá Roudka - Míchov - Milonice - Němčice - Nýrov - Obora - Okrouhlá - Olešnice - Olomučany - Ostrov u Macochy - Pamětice - Petrov - Petrovice - Prostřední Poříčí - Rájec-Jestřebí - Ráječko - Roubanina - Rozseč nad Kunštátem - Rozsíčka - Rudice - Šebetov - Sebranice - Šebrov-Kateřina - Senetářov - Skalice nad Svitavou - Skrchov - Sloup - Šošůvka - Spešov - Štěchov - Stvolová - Sudice - Suchý - Sulíkov - Světlá - Svinošice - Svitávka - Tasovice - Uhřice - Újezd u Boskovic - Újezd u Černé Hory - Úsobrno - Ústup - Valchov - Vanovice - Vavřinec - Vážany - Velenov - Velké Opatovice - Vilémovice - Vísky - Voděrady - Vranová - Vysočany - Závist - Zbraslavec - Žďár - Žďárná - Žernovník - Žerůtky

== Geography ==
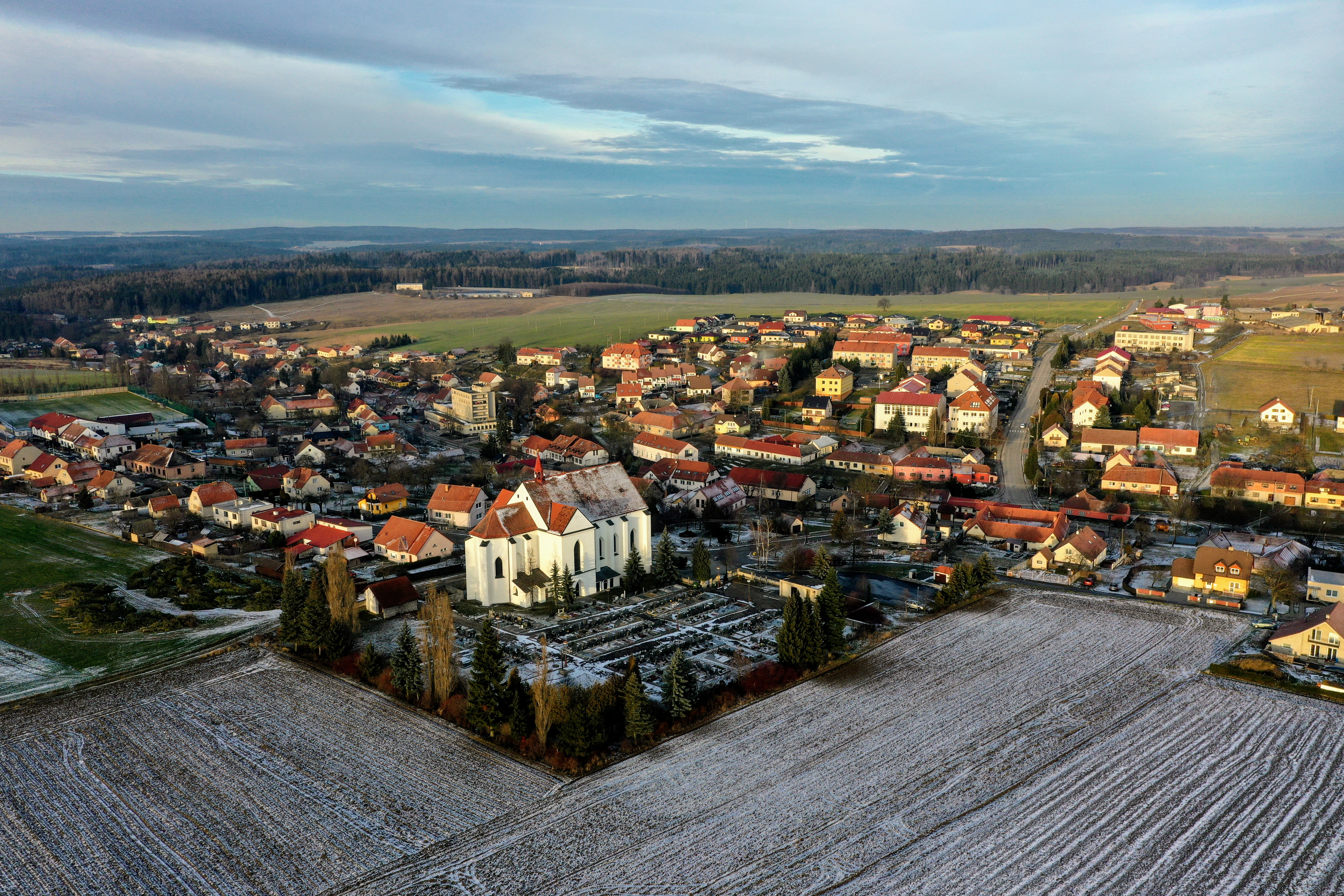
Lipovec and surrounding landscape

The landscape is rugged and it has mostly the character of highlands. The territory extends into four geomorphological mesoregions: Drahany Highlands (most of the territory), Upper Svratka Highlands (northwest), Boskovice Furrow (a strip from southwest to northeast) and Svitavy Uplands (north). The highest point of the district is a contour line on the hill Skalky in Benešov with an elevation of 728 m (2,388 ft), the lowest point is the river bed of the Svitava in Adamov at 246 m (807 ft).

From the total district area of 862.4 km^{2} (333.0 sq mi), agricultural land occupies 399.9 km^{2} (154.4 sq mi), forests occupy 376.0 km^{2} (145.2 sq mi), and water area occupies 7.6 km^{2} (2.9 sq mi). Forests cover 43.6% of the district's area.

The most important river is the Svitava, which flows across the entire territory from north to south. A notable river is also the Punkva, the longest underground river in the country. There are not many bodies of water; the most notable are Letovice Reservoir and Olšovec Pond.

Most of the Moravian Karst Protected Landscape Area lies in the district, in its southern part. It includes the Macocha Gorge and cave systems.

== Demographics ==
Historical population

Year	Pop.	±%
1869	77,979	—
1880	81,311	+4.3%
1890	83,332	+2.5%
1900	87,690	+5.2%
1910	94,148	+7.4%

Year	Pop.	±%
1921	93,166	−1.0%
1930	93,512	+0.4%
1950	87,340	−6.6%
1961	95,891	+9.8%
1970	98,522	+2.7%

Year	Pop.	±%
1980	105,044	+6.6%
1991	104,106	−0.9%
2001	104,101	−0.0%
2011	105,708	+1.5%
2021	107,227	+1.4%

Source: Censuses

=== Most populous municipalities ===
Name	Population	Area (km^{2})
Blansko	19,900	45
Boskovice	12,457	28
Letovice	7,071	51
Adamov	4,564	4
Rájec-Jestřebí	3,740	16
Velké Opatovice	3,410	26
Jedovnice	2,947	14
Kunštát	2,946	24
Černá Hora	2,124	16
Lysice	1,970	11

== Economy ==
The largest employers with headquarters in Blansko District and at least 500 employees are:

Economic entity	Location	Number of employees	Main activity
Blansko Hospital	Blansko	500–999	Health care
Boskovice Hospital	Boskovice	500–999	Health care
Minerva Boskovice	Boskovice	500–999	Manufacture of sewing machines
Alps Electric Czech	Sebranice	500–999	Manufacturie of components for consumer electronics and computers
RHI Magnesita Czech Republic	Velké Opatovice	500–999	Manufacture of refractory products

== Transport ==
There are no motorways passing through the district. The most important road is the I/43 (part of European route E461) from Brno to Svitavy.

== Sights ==
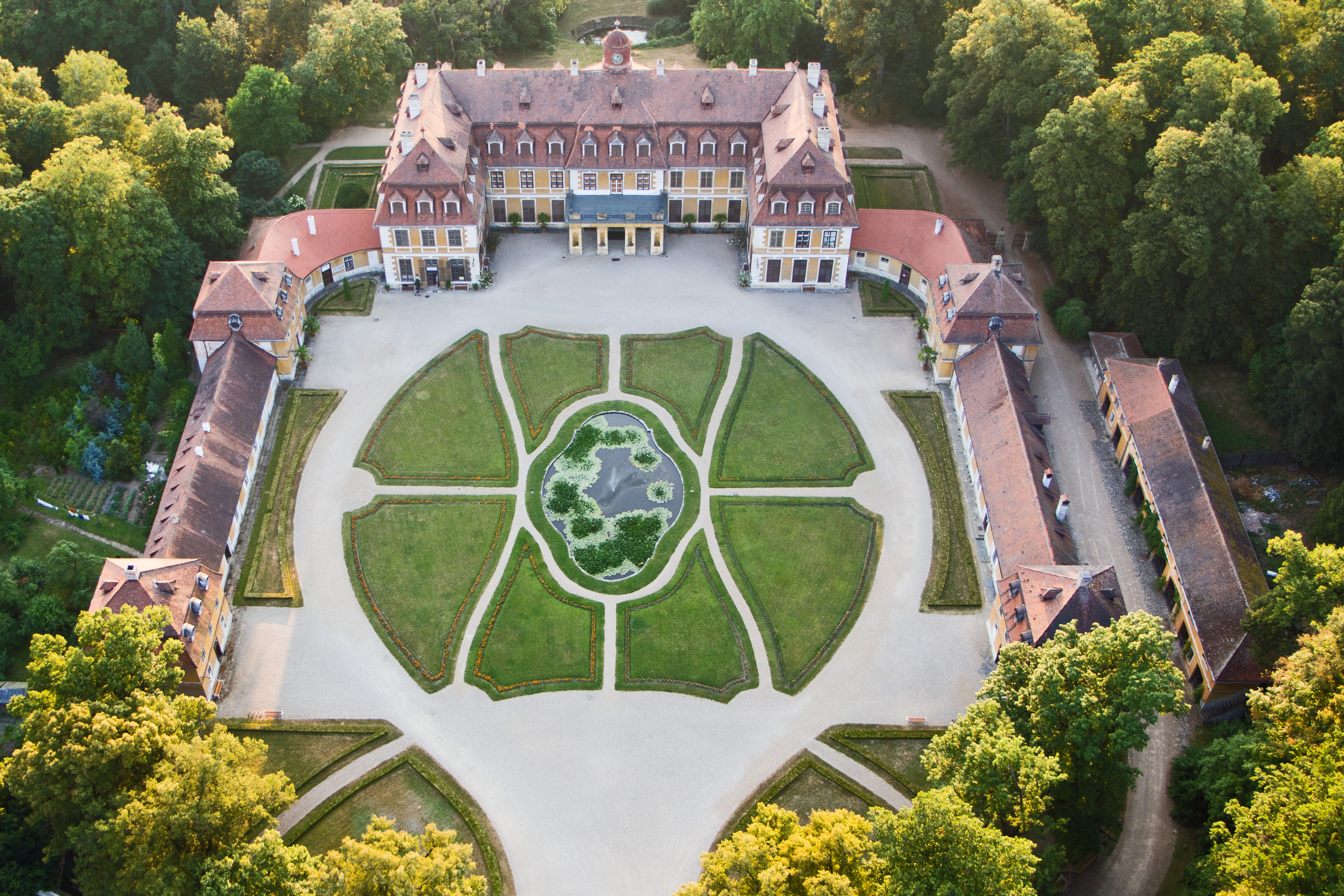
Rájec nad Svitavou Castle

The most important monuments in the district, protected as national cultural monuments, are:

- Kunštát Castle
- Lysice Castle
- Rájec nad Svitavou Castle
- Church of the Name of the Virgin Mary in Křtiny
- Stará huť ironworks in Adamov

The best-preserved settlements and landscapes, protected as monument reservations and monument zones, are:

- Stará Huť industrial area in Adamov (monument reservation)
- Boskovice
- Veselka

The most visited tourist destination are the Punkva Caves with the Macocha Gorge.
