= Křetínka =

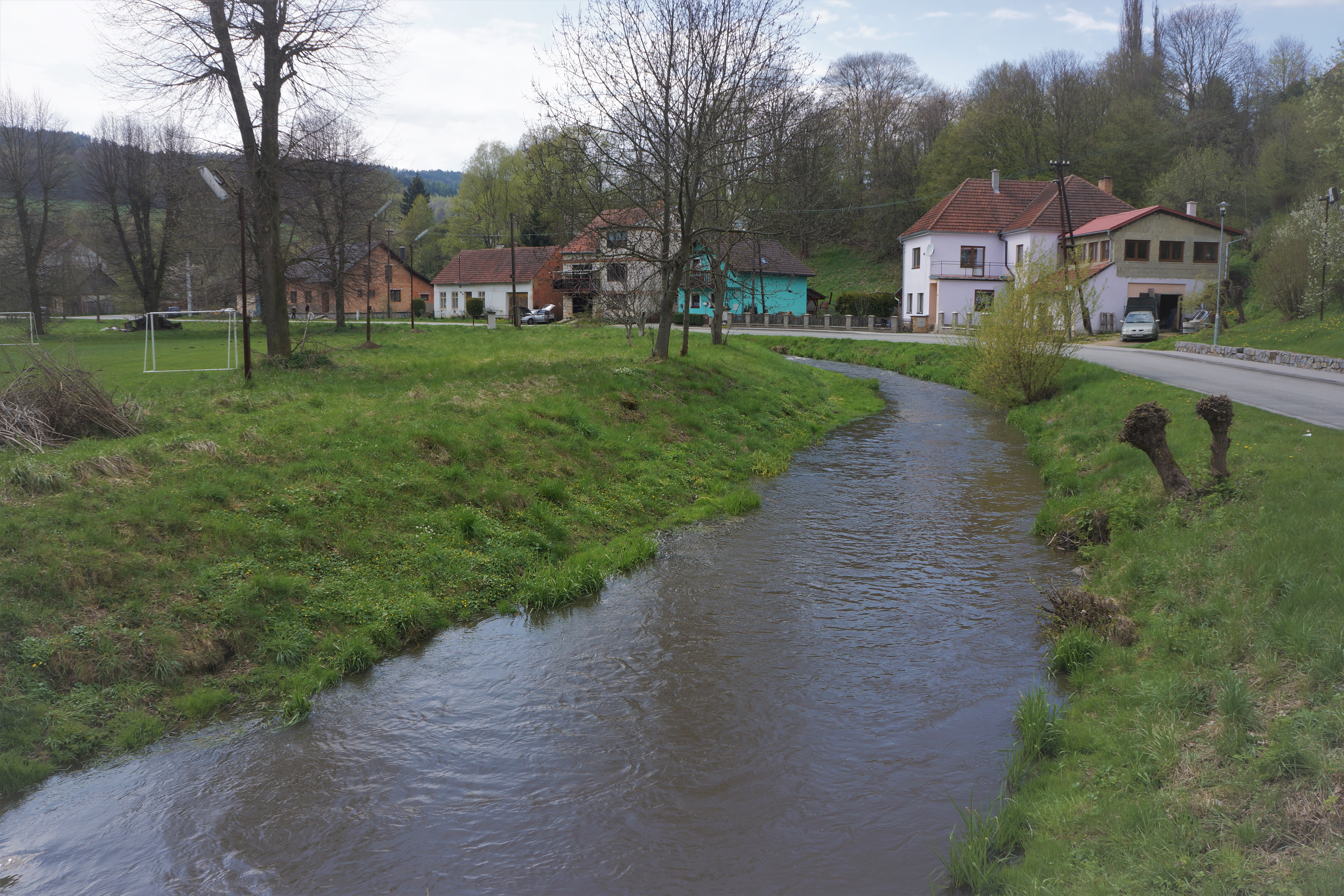
- The Křetínka in Prostřední Poříčí

Location
- Country: Czech Republic
- Regions: South Moravian; Pardubice

Physical characteristics
- Source
  - location: Radiměř, Svitavy Uplands
  - coordinates: 49°41′44″N 16°21′41″E
  - elevation: 637 m (2,090 ft)
- Mouth
  - location: Svitava
  - coordinates: 49°32′7″N 16°34′43″E
  - elevation: 324 m (1,063 ft)
- Length: 31.4 km (19.5 mi)
- Basin size: 127.4 km^{2} (49.2 sq mi)
- Discharge
  - average: 0.56 m^{3}/s (20 cu ft/s) near estuary

Basin features
- Progression: Svitava→ Svratka→ Thaya→ Morava→ Danube→ Black Sea

The Křetínka is a river in the Czech Republic, a right tributary of the Svitava River. It flows through the South Moravian and Pardubice regions. It is 31.4 km (19.5 mi) long.

== Etymology ==
The river is named after the village of Křetín, located in the middle course of the river.

== Characteristic ==
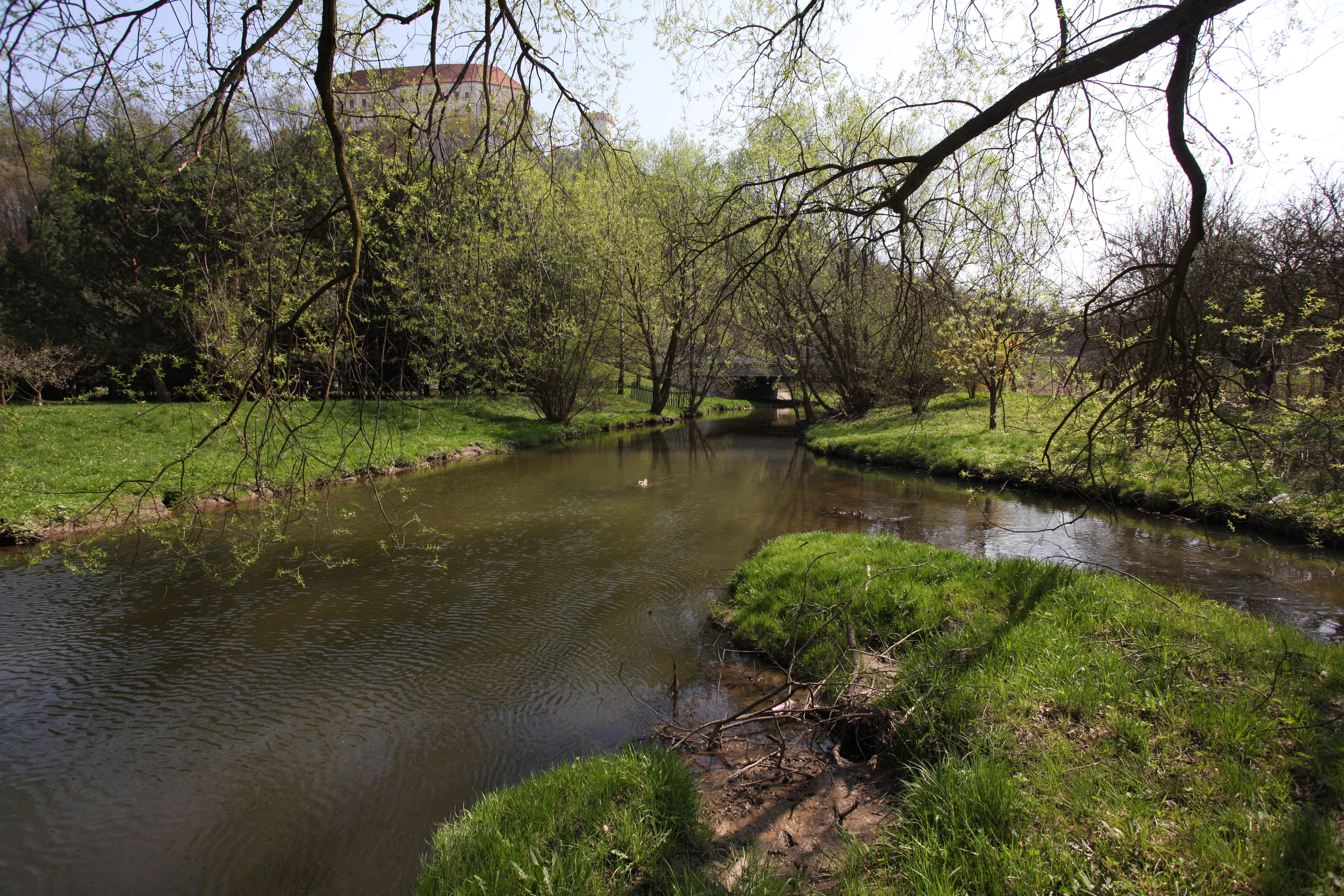
Confluence of the Svitava and Křetínka

The Křetínka originates in the territory of Radiměř in the Svitavy Uplands at an elevation of 637 m (2,090 ft) and flows to Letovice, where it enters the Svitava River at an elevation of 324 m (1,063 ft). It is 31.4 km (19.5 mi) long. Its drainage basin has an area of 127.4 km^{2} (49.2 sq mi). The average discharge near the mouth is 0.56 m^{3}/s (20 cu ft/s) m3/s.

The longest tributaries of the Křetínka are:

| Tributary | Length (km) | Side |
|---|---|---|
| Zlatý potok | 8.4 | right |
| Rohozenský potok | 7.2 | left |

== Course ==
The river flows through the municipal territories of Radiměř, Stašov, Rohozná, Jedlová, Bystré, Svojanov, Bohuňov, Horní Poříčí, Prostřední Poříčí, Křetín, Lazinov, Vranová and Letovice.

== Bodies of water ==
The largest body of water in the entire Svitava basin area is the Letovice Reservoir, built on the lower course of the Křetínka. It has an area of 98 ha (240 acres). It was built in 1972–1976 and the purpose of the reservoir is to control the flow of the Svitava River, flood protection, electricity production, recreation and sport fishing.

== Fauna ==
The fish that live in the river include river trout, rainbow trout, brook trout and grayling.

== See also ==
- List of rivers of the Czech Republic
