= Radiměř =

- Market town
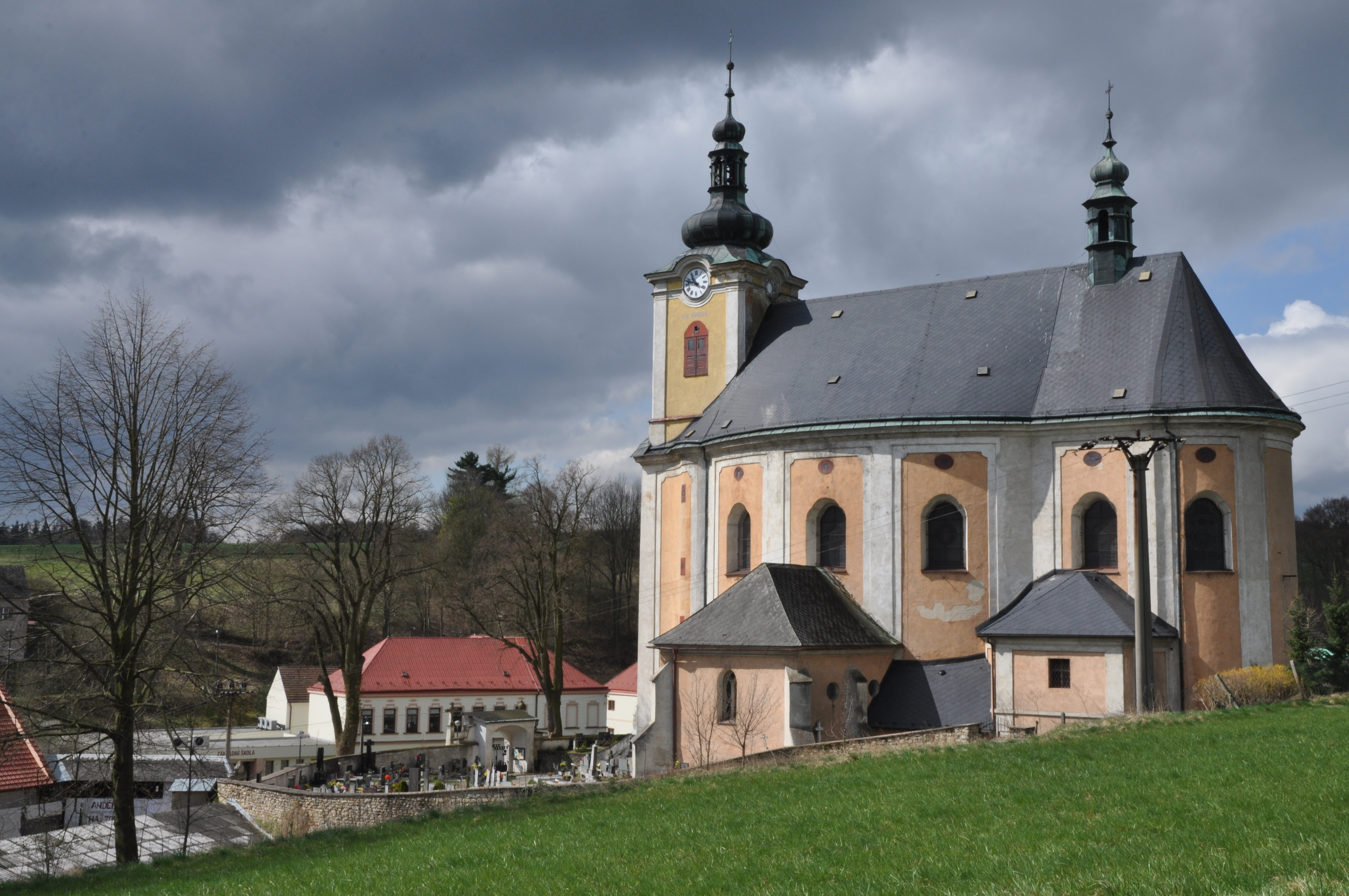
- Church of Saint Anne

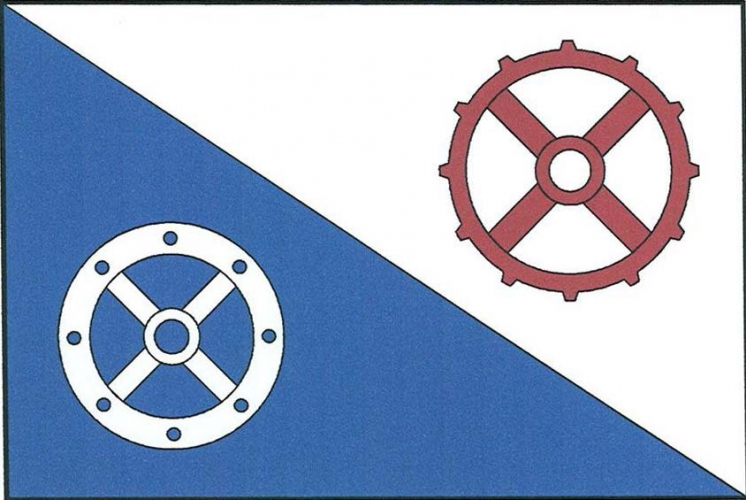
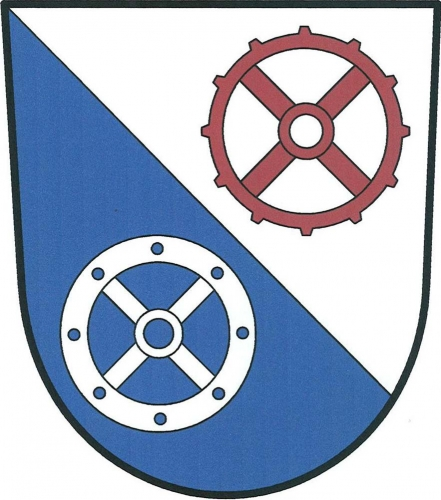
- Flag Coat of arms

- Location in the Czech Republic
- Coordinates: 49°41′58″N 16°25′53″E
- Country: Czech Republic
- Region: Pardubice
- District: Svitavy
- First mentioned: 1291

Area
  - Total: 28.58 km^{2} (11.03 sq mi)
- Elevation: 485 m (1,591 ft)

Population (2026-01-01)
  - Total: 1,260
  - Density: 44.1/km^{2} (114/sq mi)
- Time zone: UTC+1 (CET)
  - Summer (DST): UTC+2 (CEST)
- Postal code: 569 07
- Website: www.obec-radimer.cz

Radiměř (Czech pronunciation: [ˈraɟɪmɲɛr̝̊]; German: Rothmühl) is a market town in Svitavy District in the Pardubice Region of the Czech Republic. It has about 1,300 inhabitants.

== Etymology ==
The name is derived from the personal name Radimír, meaning "Radimír's (court)".

== Geography ==
Radiměř is located about 6 kilometres (4 mi) south of Svitavy and 59 km (37 mi) southeast of Pardubice. It lies in the Svitavy Uplands. The highest point is at 683 m (2,241 ft) above sea level. The built-up area is situated along the stream Radiměřský potok. The Křetínka River originates in the western part of the municipal territory. The market town is situated on the historical border between Bohemia and Moravia.

== History ==
The first written mention of Radiměř is in a deed of Queen Judith of Habsburg from 1291. It was probably founded by the lokator Konrád of Levendorf. Two parts used to be distinguished – Radiměř (from the 19th century known as Česká Radiměř – 'Bohemian Radiměř') and Moravská ('Moravian') Radiměř. It was successively a part of the Svojanov, Letovice and Kunštát estates.

== Demographics ==
Historical population

Year	Pop.	±%
1869	3,593	—
1880	3,622	+0.8%
1890	3,486	−3.8%
1900	3,422	−1.8%
1910	3,186	−6.9%

Year	Pop.	±%
1921	2,810	−11.8%
1930	2,603	−7.4%
1950	1,379	−47.0%
1961	1,415	+2.6%
1970	1,343	−5.1%

Year	Pop.	±%
1980	1,233	−8.2%
1991	1,140	−7.5%
2001	1,146	+0.5%
2011	1,066	−7.0%
2021	1,113	+4.4%

Source: Censuses

== Transport ==
There are no railways or major roads passing through the municipal territory.

== Sights ==
The main landmark of Radiměř is the Church of Saint Anne. It was built in the late Baroque style in 1771, on the site of an older Gothic church from the second half of the 14th century. The presbytery with supporting pillars has been preserved from the original church.

== Notable people ==
- Hugo Jury (1887–1945), Austrian Nazi politician
