= Vranová =

- Municipality
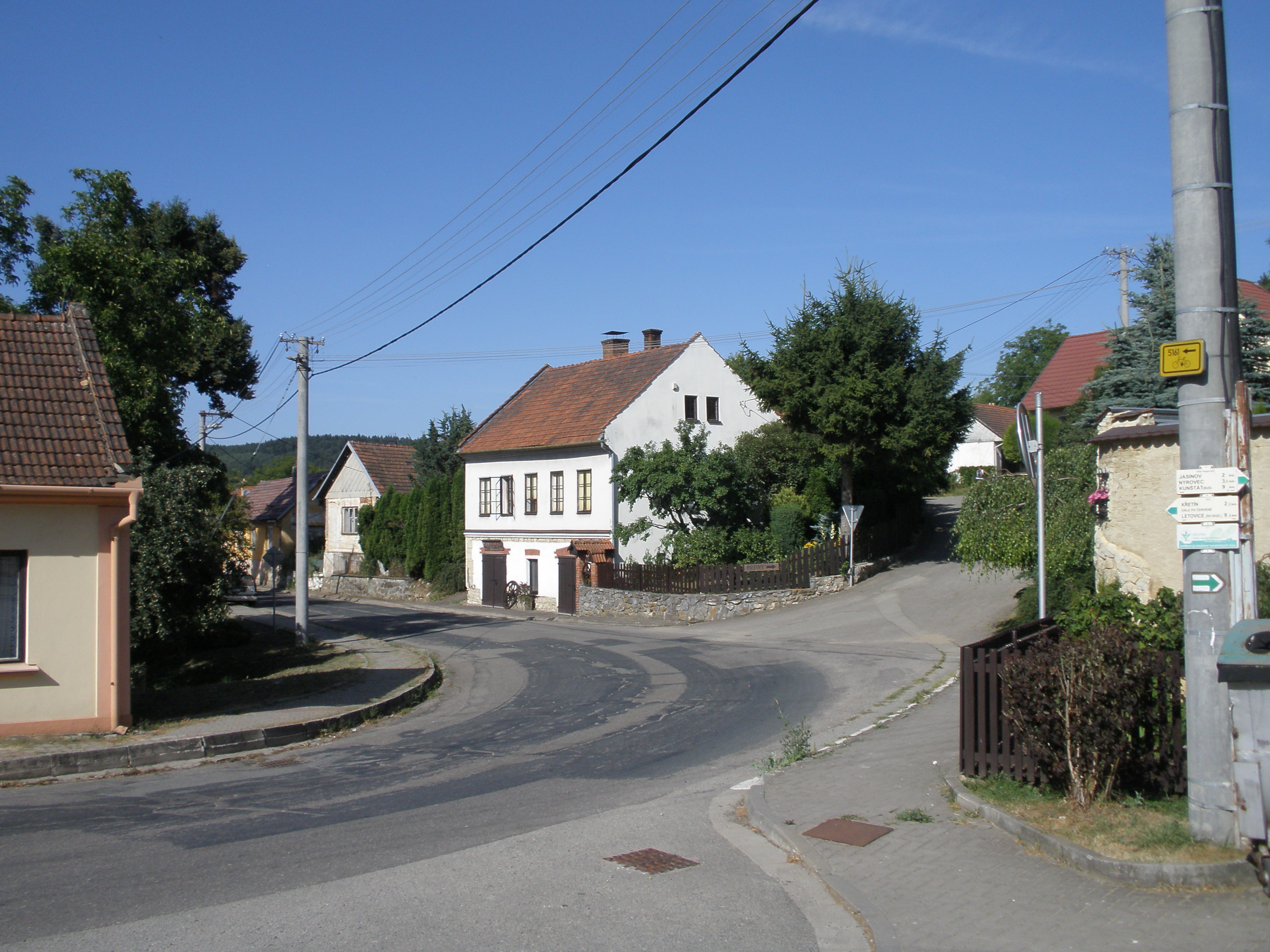
- Road through Vranová

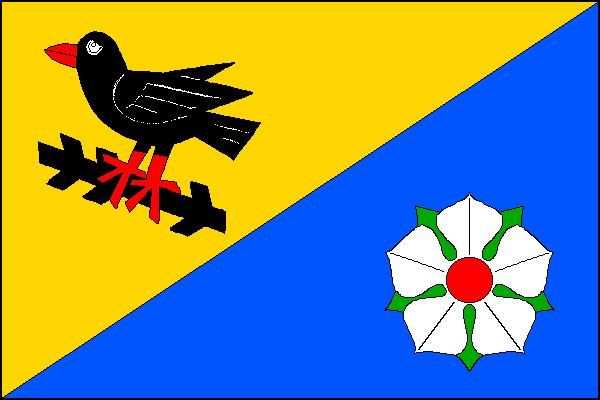
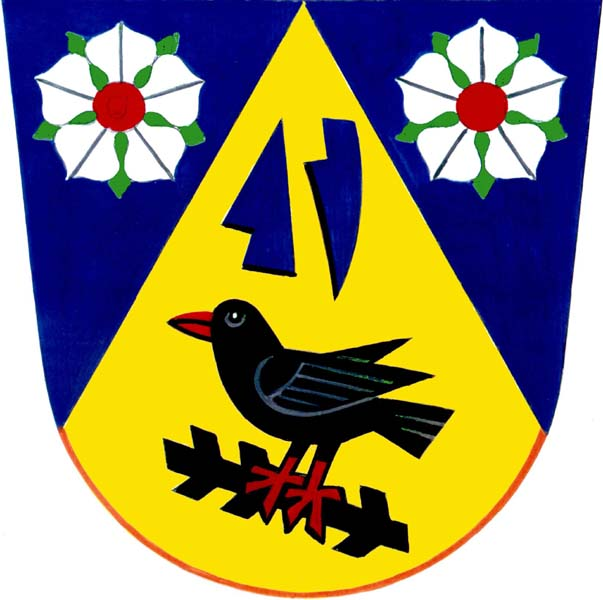
- Flag Coat of arms

- Location in the Czech Republic
- Coordinates: 49°33′15″N 16°31′29″E
- Country: Czech Republic
- Region: South Moravian
- District: Blansko
- First mentioned: 1398

Area
  - Total: 3.90 km^{2} (1.51 sq mi)
- Elevation: 395 m (1,296 ft)

Population (2026-01-01)
  - Total: 407
  - Density: 104/km^{2} (270/sq mi)
- Time zone: UTC+1 (CET)
  - Summer (DST): UTC+2 (CEST)
- Postal code: 679 62
- Website: www.vranova.info

Vranová is a municipality and village in Blansko District in the South Moravian Region of the Czech Republic. It has about 400 inhabitants.

== Etymology ==
The village was probably named after its lokator, whose name was Vrána.

== Geography ==
Vranová is located about 23 kilometres (14 mi) north of Blansko and 38 km (24 mi) north of Brno. It lies in the Upper Svratka Highlands. The highest point is the hill Fadrnák at 547 m (1,795 ft) above sea level. The municipality is situated on the shore of Letovice Reservoir, which is built on the Křetínka River.

== History ==
The first written mention of Vranová is from 1398. It belonged to the Letovice estate and shared its owners.

== Demographics ==
Historical population

Year	Pop.	±%
1869	356	—
1880	412	+15.7%
1890	432	+4.9%
1900	462	+6.9%
1910	523	+13.2%

Year	Pop.	±%
1921	509	−2.7%
1930	494	−2.9%
1950	378	−23.5%
1961	363	−4.0%
1970	320	−11.8%

Year	Pop.	±%
1980	289	−9.7%
1991	307	+6.2%
2001	321	+4.6%
2011	347	+8.1%
2021	392	+13.0%

Source: Censuses

== Transport ==
There are no railways or major roads passing through the municipal territory.

== Sights ==
Vranová is poor in monuments. The only protected cultural monument is a homestead from the 19th century, one of the last examples of the local folk architecture.
