= Rohozná =

Rohozná may refer to places in the Czech Republic:

- Rohozná (Jihlava District), a municipality and village in the Vysočina Region
- Rohozná (Svitavy District), a municipality and village in the Pardubice Region
- Rohozná, a village and part of Osek (Strakonice District) in the South Bohemian Region
- Rohozná, a village and part of Trhová Kamenice in the Pardubice Region
