= Horní Poříčí =

Horní Poříčí may refer to places in the Czech Republic:

- Horní Poříčí (Blansko District), a municipality and village in the South Moravian Region
- Horní Poříčí (Strakonice District), a municipality and village in the South Bohemian Region
