= Korouhev =

- Municipality
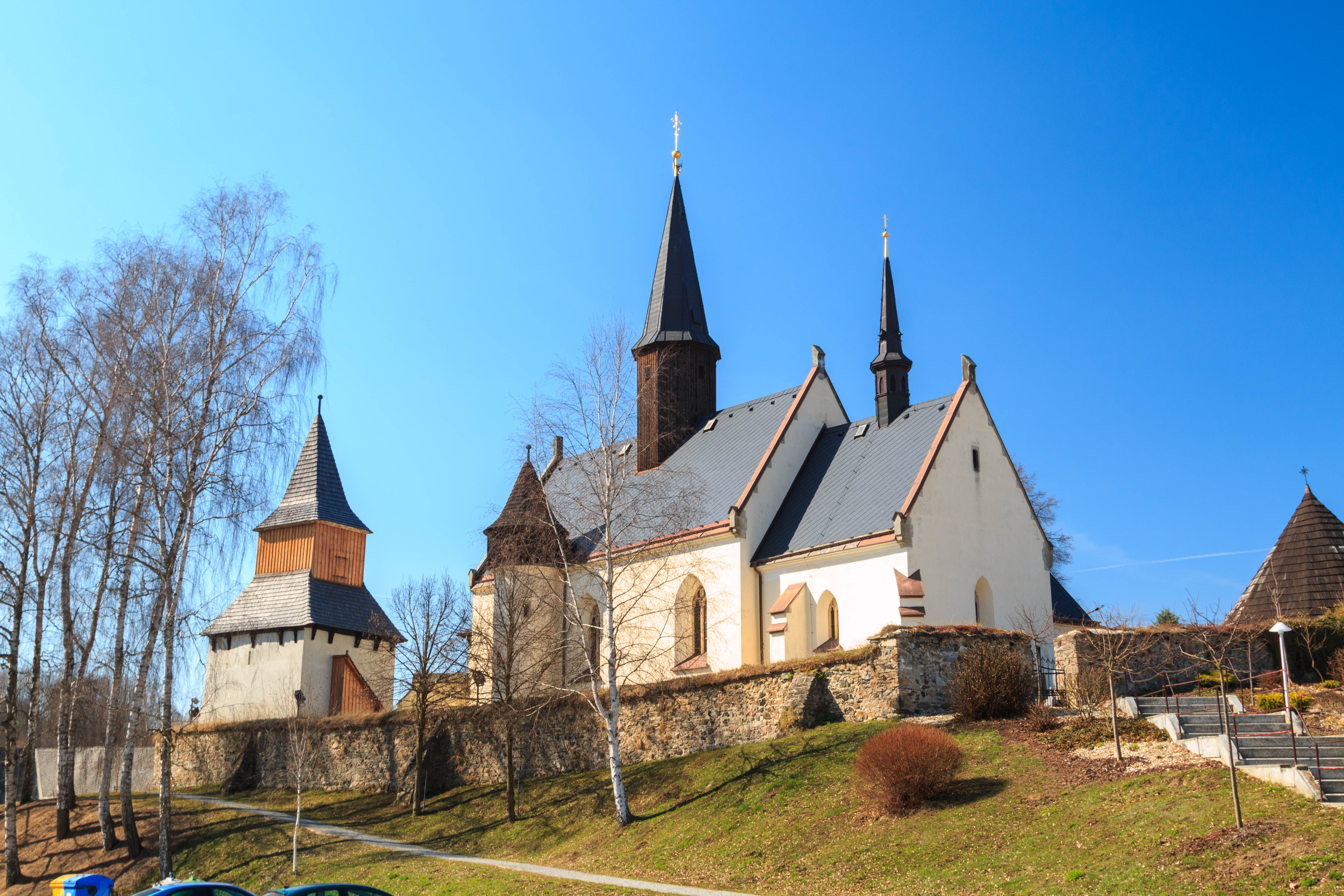
- Church of Saints Peter and Paul

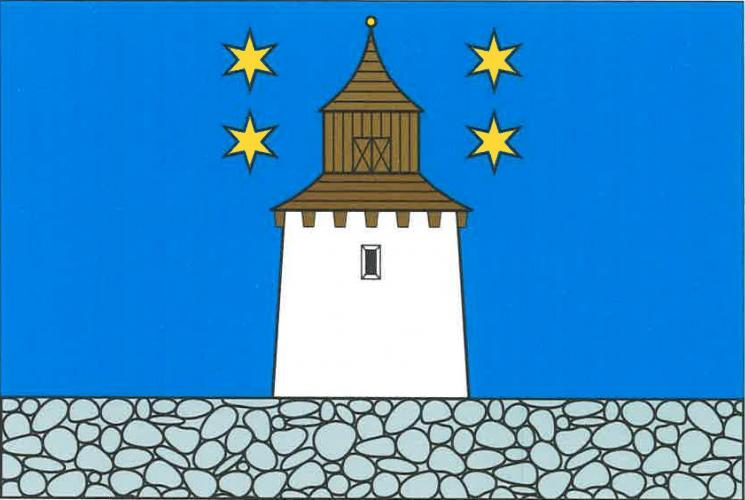
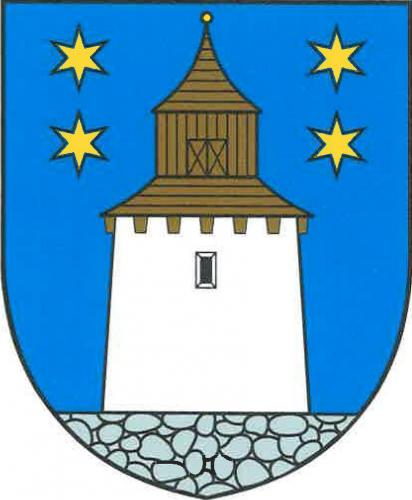
- Flag Coat of arms

- Location in the Czech Republic
- Coordinates: 49°40′17″N 16°14′45″E
- Country: Czech Republic
- Region: Pardubice
- District: Svitavy
- First mentioned: 1279

Area
  - Total: 17.87 km^{2} (6.90 sq mi)
- Elevation: 558 m (1,831 ft)

Population (2026-01-01)
  - Total: 810
  - Density: 45/km^{2} (120/sq mi)
- Time zone: UTC+1 (CET)
  - Summer (DST): UTC+2 (CEST)
- Postal codes: 569 93, 572 01
- Website: obeckorouhev.cz

Korouhev (German: Kurau) is a municipality and village in Svitavy District in the Pardubice Region of the Czech Republic. It has about 800 inhabitants.

== Administrative division ==
Korouhev consists of two municipal parts (in brackets population according to the 2021 census):

- Korouhev (724)
- Lačnov (37)

== Etymology ==
The name Korouhev means 'pennon' in Czech (and in modern Czech also 'weather vane'). The village probably got its name from its length.

== Geography ==
Polička is located about 18 kilometres (11 mi) southwest of Svitavy and 52 km (32 mi) southeast of Pardubice. It lies in the Upper Svratka Highlands. The highest point is the hill U Jamek at 713 m (2,339 ft) above sea level. The stream Korouhevský potok flows through the village.

== History ==
The first written mention of Korouhev is from 1167. Until 1555, the village belonged to the Svojanov estate. In 1555, most of Korouhev was annexed to the Bystré estate, only a small part was annexed to the Polička estate.

== Demographics ==
Historical population

Year	Pop.	±%
1869	1,458	—
1880	1,536	+5.3%
1890	1,602	+4.3%
1900	1,663	+3.8%
1910	1,585	−4.7%

Year	Pop.	±%
1921	1,597	+0.8%
1930	1,650	+3.3%
1950	1,106	−33.0%
1961	1,079	−2.4%
1970	967	−10.4%

Year	Pop.	±%
1980	836	−13.5%
1991	791	−5.4%
2001	768	−2.9%
2011	759	−1.2%
2021	761	+0.3%

Source: Censuses

== Transport ==
There are no railways or major roads passing through the municipality.

== Sights ==
The main landmark of Korouhev is the Church of Saints Peter and Paul. It was built in the early Gothic style and modified in the Baroque style. Its current appearance is the result of neo-Gothic reconstruction. Next to the church is a separate bell tower from the 17th century.
