= Hugo Jury =

Austrian Nazi, Gauleiter, SS-Obergruppenführer (1887–1945)

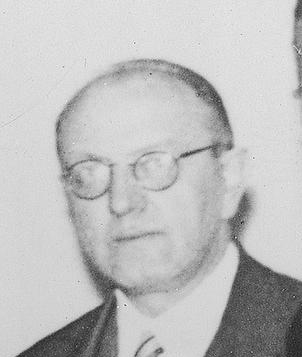
- Jury in 1938

Gauleiter of Reichsgau Niederdonau
- In office 21 May 1938 – 8 May 1945
- Preceded by: Roman Jäger
- Succeeded by: Position abolished

Reichsstatthalter of Lower Austria
- In office 1 April 1940 – 8 May 1945
- Preceded by: Position created
- Succeeded by: Position abolished

Landeshauptmann of Lower Austria
- In office 24 May 1938 – 1 April 1940
- Preceded by: Roman Jäger
- Succeeded by: Position abolished

Federal Minister of Social Affairs
- In office 11 March 1938 – 13 March 1938
- Chancellor: Arthur Seyss-Inquart
- Preceded by: Josef Resch
- Succeeded by: Johann Böhm

Personal details
- Born: 13 July 1887 Mährisch-Rothmühl, Moravia, Austro-Hungarian Empire
- Died: 8 May 1945 (aged 57) Zwettl, German Reich (now in Austria)
- Cause of death: Suicide
- Party: Nazi Party
- Spouse: Karoline Roppert (m. 1913)
- Education: Karl Ferdinand University
- Profession: Physician

Hugo Jury (13 July 1887 – 8 May 1945) was an Austrian Nazi who held the offices of Gauleiter of Reichsgau Niederdonau and Reichsstatthalter (Reich Governor) for Lower Austria. At the end of World War II in Europe, he committed suicide in the town of Zwettl.

== Early life ==
Jury was the son of Hugo Jury (1856–1931) a teacher in Rothmühl, Moravia and Julia Jury (1862–1934, née Haberhauer). Educated in the local Gymnasium, he began studying medicine at the Karl Ferdinand University in Prague in 1905. From 1908 to 1909, he served as a one-year volunteer in the Austro-Hungarian army. On 31 October 1911, he received his doctorate in medicine. On 14 January 1913, he married Karoline Roppert in Vienna. After his internship, Jury served temporarily as a ship's doctor. After several voyages, he then worked from 1913 to 1919 as a community health doctor in Frankenfels.

During the First World War he was called up to serve as a doctor in a military hospital. He was then employed as chief physician of a POW officers' camp, not far from Frankenfels. Discharged in 1919, he began medical practice as a pulmonary specialist in tuberculosis in St. Pölten.

== Career in Austria ==
Jury became a member of the Austrian right-wing organization, the Heimwehr, in 1927. On 15 February 1931, he joined the Austrian Nazi Party. In St. Pölten, he was the Nazi Party Ortsgruppenleiter (local group leader) and, in 1932, leader of his party faction in the municipal council. After the Austrian Nazi Party was banned on 19 June 1933, he continued to work underground, advancing to the positions of Bezirksleiter and Kreisleiter, during which time he was arrested and detained several times.

He became Deputy Landesleiter (state leader) of the illegal Nazi Party under Josef Leopold in autumn 1936 and held this post until 1938. After the reorganization of the government forced on Chancellor Kurt Schuschnigg by Adolf Hitler, Jury was appointed to the Austrian State Council on 20 February 1938 and became deputy to Arthur Seyss-Inquart, the Nazi Austrian Interior Minister. On 11 March 1938, Jury was appointed Minister for Social Administration in the short-lived federal government of now-Chancellor Seyss-Inquart. On 12 March he joined the SS with the rank of Sturmbannführer.

== Career under the Third Reich ==
After the Anschluss of Austria to the German Reich on 13 March 1938, Jury remained head of the same Social Administration Ministry in the state government of Austria until 24 May. At the parliamentary election of 10 April, he was elected as a Nazi deputy to the Reichstag from the newly renamed Ostmark. On 21 May, he was appointed by Hitler as the Nazi Party Gauleiter of the Reichsgau Niederdonau. On 24 May, he was named Landeshauptmann for the state of Lower Austria, thus uniting under his control the highest party and governmental offices in his jurisdiction.

In March 1939, he became the head of the party liaison office for the Protectorate of Bohemia and Moravia. On 15 March 1940, he was appointed as Reichsstatthalter (Reich Governor) of Lower Austria, effective 1 April. On 16 November 1942, he became the Reich Defense Commissioner for his Gau. On 15 June 1943, Heinrich Himmler named him the Reich Commissioner for the Consolidation of German Nationality in his Gau. He was promoted to SS-Obergruppenführer on 21 June 1943.

Hugo Jury was an ardent advocate of Nazi racial policies. He supported the persecution of Jews, Sinti and Roma, as well as the mentally or physically incapacitated. Jury particularly was interested in "Germanizing" his home region of Moravia, some administrative districts of which were administered as part of Reichsgau Niederdonau. On 23 March 1945, Jury attended a conference with Himmler, other Austrian Nazi leaders and the commandant of the Mauthausen concentration camp. Himmler ordered the evacuation of all camp inmates in Austria, decreeing that none should fall into Allied hands. On 15 April, Jury ordered the execution of 44 prisoners at the Stein prison in Krems.

Towards the end of the war in Europe, when Vienna was falling to the Soviet Red Army, Jury fled westward and arrived in Krems. Jury, a fanatical Nazi, continued to call for armed resistance, personally commanding a Volkssturm force against Soviet forces. After the final collapse of Nazi Germany, on the night of 8 May 1945, Hugo Jury committed suicide by shooting himself in the town of Zwettl.

He was reputed to have been one of the lovers of Elisabeth Schwarzkopf.

== Awards and decorations ==
- Blood Order
- Golden Party Badge
- War Merit Cross 1st and 2nd class without swords

== Sources ==
- Karl Höffkes: Hitlers Politische Generale. Die Gauleiter des Dritten Reiches: ein biographisches Nachschlagewerk. Grabert-Verlag, Tübingen, 1986, ISBN 3-87847-163-7.
- Miller, Michael D.; Schulz, Andreas (2017). Gauleiter: The Regional Leaders of the Nazi Party and Their Deputies, 1925–1945. Vol. 2 (Georg Joel - Dr. Bernhard Rust). R. James Bender Publishing. ISBN 978-1-932-97032-6.
- Williams, Max (2015). SS Elite: The Senior Leaders of Hitler's Praetorian Guard. Vol. 1. Fonthill Media LLC. ISBN 978-1-781-55433-3.
