= Prostřední Poříčí =

- Municipality
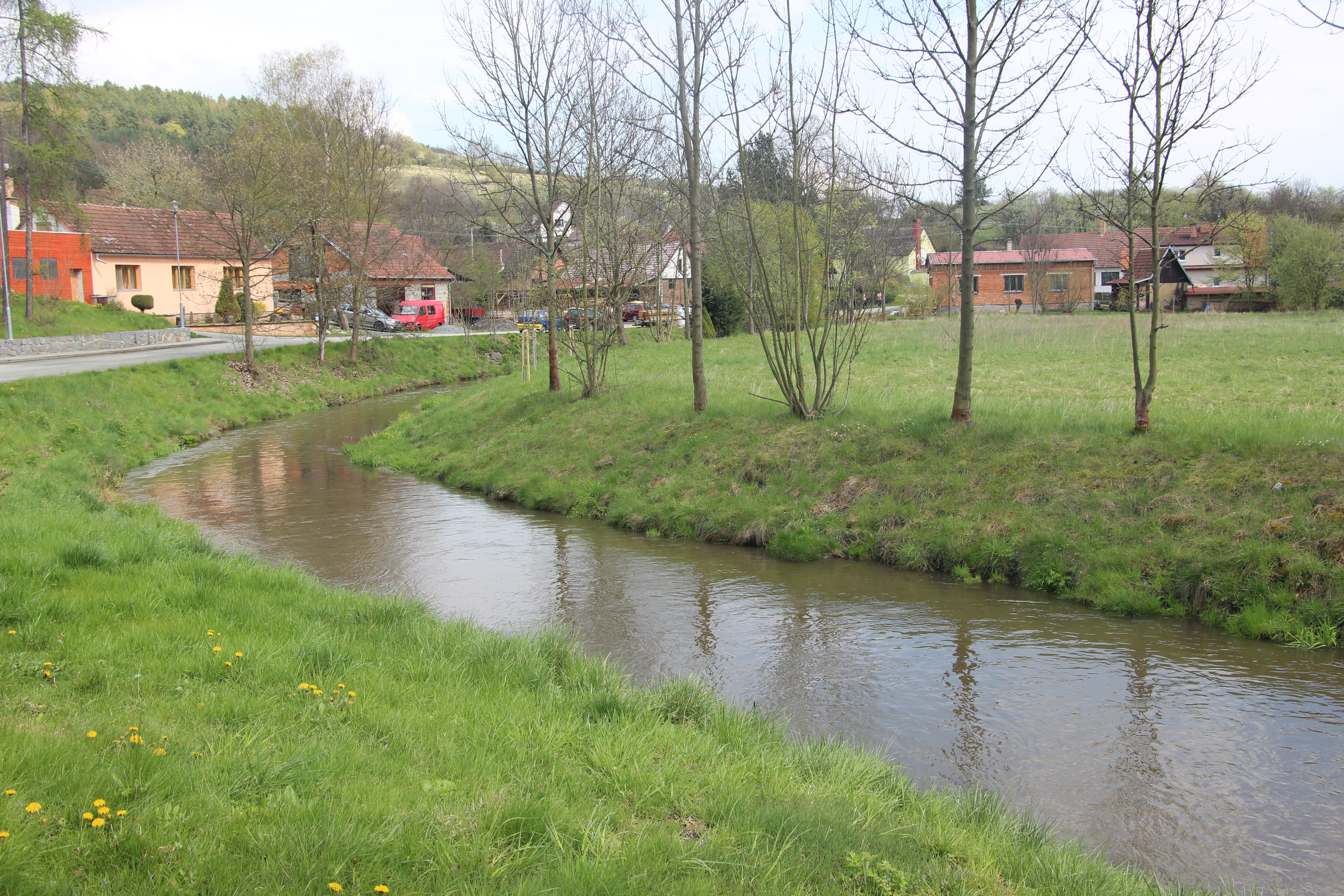
- Křetínka River in Prostřední Poříčí

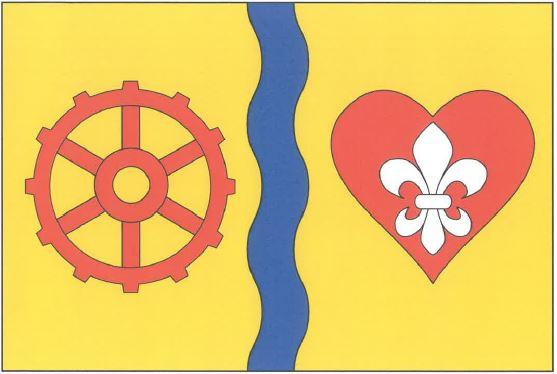
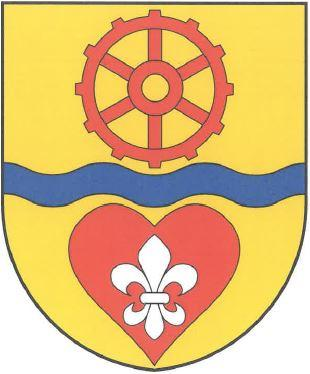
- Flag Coat of arms

- Location in the Czech Republic
- Coordinates: 49°34′20″N 16°29′51″E
- Country: Czech Republic
- Region: South Moravian
- District: Blansko
- First mentioned: 1629

Area
  - Total: 4.89 km^{2} (1.89 sq mi)
- Elevation: 370 m (1,210 ft)

Population (2026-01-01)
  - Total: 268
  - Density: 54.8/km^{2} (142/sq mi)
- Time zone: UTC+1 (CET)
  - Summer (DST): UTC+2 (CEST)
- Postal code: 679 62
- Website: www.prostredniporici.cz

Prostřední Poříčí (German: Mittel Porschütz) is a municipality and village in Blansko District in the South Moravian Region of the Czech Republic. It has about 300 inhabitants.

Prostřední Poříčí lies approximately 27 kilometres (17 mi) north-west of Blansko, 44 km (27 mi) north of Brno, and 159 km (99 mi) east of Prague.

== Demographics ==
Historical population
| Year | Pop. | ±% |
|---|---|---|
| 1869 | 438 | — |
| 1880 | 502 | +14.6% |
| 1890 | 508 | +1.2% |
| 1900 | 533 | +4.9% |
| 1910 | 616 | +15.6% |
| 1921 | 535 | −13.1% |
| 1930 | 519 | −3.0% |
| 1950 | 378 | −27.2% |
| 1961 | 404 | +6.9% |
| 1970 | 362 | −10.4% |
| 1980 | 288 | −20.4% |
| 1991 | 272 | −5.6% |
| 2001 | 274 | +0.7% |
| 2011 | 273 | −0.4% |
| 2021 | 257 | −5.9% |
Source: Censuses
