= Reichsgau Niederdonau =

Administrative division of Nazi Germany in annexed Austria

Reichsgau Lower Danube
- Reichsgau of Nazi Germany
- 1938–1945
- Flag Coat of arms

- Map of Nazi Germany showing its administrative subdivisions (Gaue and Reichsgaue)
- Capital: Krems
- Population
  - 1939: 1,698,658
- Government
- Gauleiter
  - 1939–1945: Hugo Jury
- History
  - Anschluss: 12 March 1938
  - German surrender: 8 May 1945
Preceded by
Lower Austria
Burgenland
Czechoslovakia
Succeeded by
Lower Austria
Burgenland
Czechoslovakia
- Today part of: Austria; Czech Republic; Slovakia

The Reichsgau Lower Danube (German: Reichsgau Niederdonau) was an administrative division of Nazi Germany consisting of areas in Lower Austria, Burgenland, southeastern parts of Bohemia, southern parts of Moravia, later expanded with Devín and Petržalka. It existed between 1939 and 1945.

== History ==
The Nazi Gau (plural Gaue) system was originally established in a party conference on 22 May 1926, in order to improve administration of the party structure. From 1933 onwards, after the Nazi seizure of power, the Gaue increasingly replaced the German states as administrative subdivisions in Germany. On 12 March 1938 Nazi Germany annexed Austria and on 24 May the Austrian provinces were reorganized and replaced by seven Nazi party Gaue. Under the Ostmarkgesetz law of 14 April 1939 with effect of 1 May, the Austrian Gaue were raised to the status of Reichsgaue and their Gauleiters were subsequently also named Reichsstatthalters.

At the head of each Gau stood a Gauleiter, a position which became increasingly more powerful, especially after the outbreak of the Second World War. Local Gauleiters were in charge of propaganda and surveillance and, from September 1944 onwards, the Volkssturm and the defence of the Gau.

The position of Gauleiter in Lower Danube was held by Hugo Jury for the duration of the existence of the Gau.

== Administrative divisions ==
The administrative divisions of the Gau:

=== Urban districts / Stadtkreise ===
1. City of Krems
2. City of Sankt Pölten
3. City of Wiener Neustadt

=== Rural districts / Landkreise ===
1. Landkreis Amstetten
2. Landkreis Baden
3. Landkreis Bruck an der Leitha
4. Landkreis Eisenstadt
5. Landkreis Gänserndorf
6. Landkreis Gmünd
7. Landkreis Hollabrunn
8. Landkreis Horn
9. Landkreis Korneuburg
10. Landkreis Krems
11. Landkreis Lilienfeld
12. Landkreis Melk
13. Landkreis Mistelbach an der Zaya
14. Landkreis Neubistritz
15. Landkreis Neunkirchen in Niederdonau
16. Landkreis Nikolsburg
17. Landkreis Oberpullendorf
18. Landkreis Sankt Pölten
19. Landkreis Scheibbs
20. Landkreis Tulln
21. Landkreis Waidhofen an der Thaya
22. Landkreis Wiener Neustadt
23. Landkreis Znaim
24. Landkreis Zwettl
