= Alois Biach =

Austrian medical doctor and writer

- Born: 1 May 1849; Letovice, Moravia, Austrian Empire
- Died: 1918 (aged 68–69)
- Occupations: Medical doctor and writer
- Writing career
- Language: German

Alois Biach (1 May 1849 – 1918) was an Austrian medical doctor and writer.

== Life ==
Biach was born in Letovice, Moravia, in 1849. He was educated at the gymnasium at Brno and at the University of Vienna. After graduating as Doctor of Medicine in 1873, he established himself in Vienna, where he was appointed a member of the board of health. In 1883 he became privat-docent of medicine at the university in that city. Biach also occupied the position of secretary to the society of medical doctors of Lower Austria.

== Publication ==
- "Über Aneurysmen an den Herzklappen". Jahrbücher der Gesellschaft der Ärzte in Wien. 1878.
- "Über Jaborandi und seine Alkaloide". Mittheilungen des Vereins der Ärzte in Niederösterreich. 1879.
- Biach, Alois; Loimann, Gustav (1881). "Versuche über die Physiologische Wirkung des Chinolins". Archiv für pathologische Anatomie und Physiologie und für klinische Medicin. 86 (3): 456–461. doi:10.1007/BF01915729. S2CID 37608887.
- "Cirrhosis hepatis mit wandständiger Thrombose der Vena portæ und Vena meseraica superior". Mittheilungen des Vereins der Ärzte in Niederösterreich. 1884.
- Die neueren Antipyretica. Vienna: Urban & Schwarzenberg. 1889.
- "Entwicklung von Krebs des Magens auf der Basis eines Runden Magengeschwürs". Wiener Medizinische Presse. 1890.
