= Horní Poříčí (Strakonice District) =

- Municipality
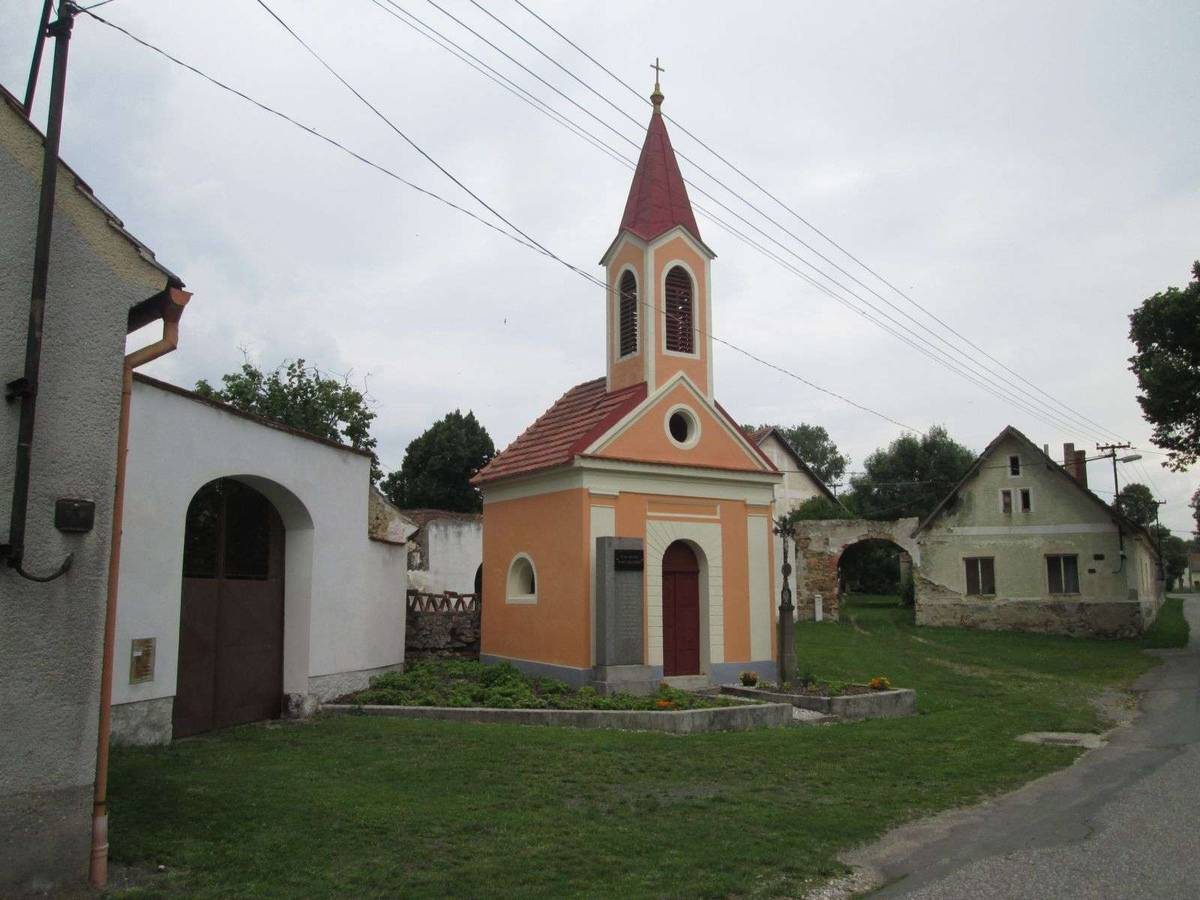
- Chapel of Saint Mary Magdalene

- Flag Coat of arms

- Location in the Czech Republic
- Coordinates: 49°17′10″N 13°46′58″E
- Country: Czech Republic
- Region: South Bohemian
- District: Strakonice
- First mentioned: 1315

Area
  - Total: 7.05 km^{2} (2.72 sq mi)
- Elevation: 412 m (1,352 ft)

Population (2026-01-01)
  - Total: 306
  - Density: 43.4/km^{2} (112/sq mi)
- Time zone: UTC+1 (CET)
  - Summer (DST): UTC+2 (CEST)
- Postal code: 386 01
- Website: www.horniporici.cz

Horní Poříčí is a municipality and village in Strakonice District in the South Bohemian Region of the Czech Republic. It has about 300 inhabitants.

Horní Poříčí lies approximately 10 kilometres (6 mi) west of Strakonice, 62 km (39 mi) north-west of České Budějovice, and 100 km (62 mi) south-west of Prague.

== Administrative division ==
Horní Poříčí consists of two municipal parts (in brackets population according to the 2021 census):

- Horní Poříčí (129)
- Dolní Poříčí (148)

== Demographics ==
Historical population
Year	Pop.	±%
1869	607	—
1880	602	−0.8%
1890	533	−11.5%
1900	533	+0.0%
1910	523	−1.9%
1921	555	+6.1%
1930	534	−3.8%
1950	403	−24.5%
1961	377	−6.5%
1970	325	−13.8%
1980	318	−2.2%
1991	272	−14.5%
2001	297	+9.2%
2011	301	+1.3%
2021	277	−8.0%
Source: Censuses
