= Frankenfels =

- Municipality
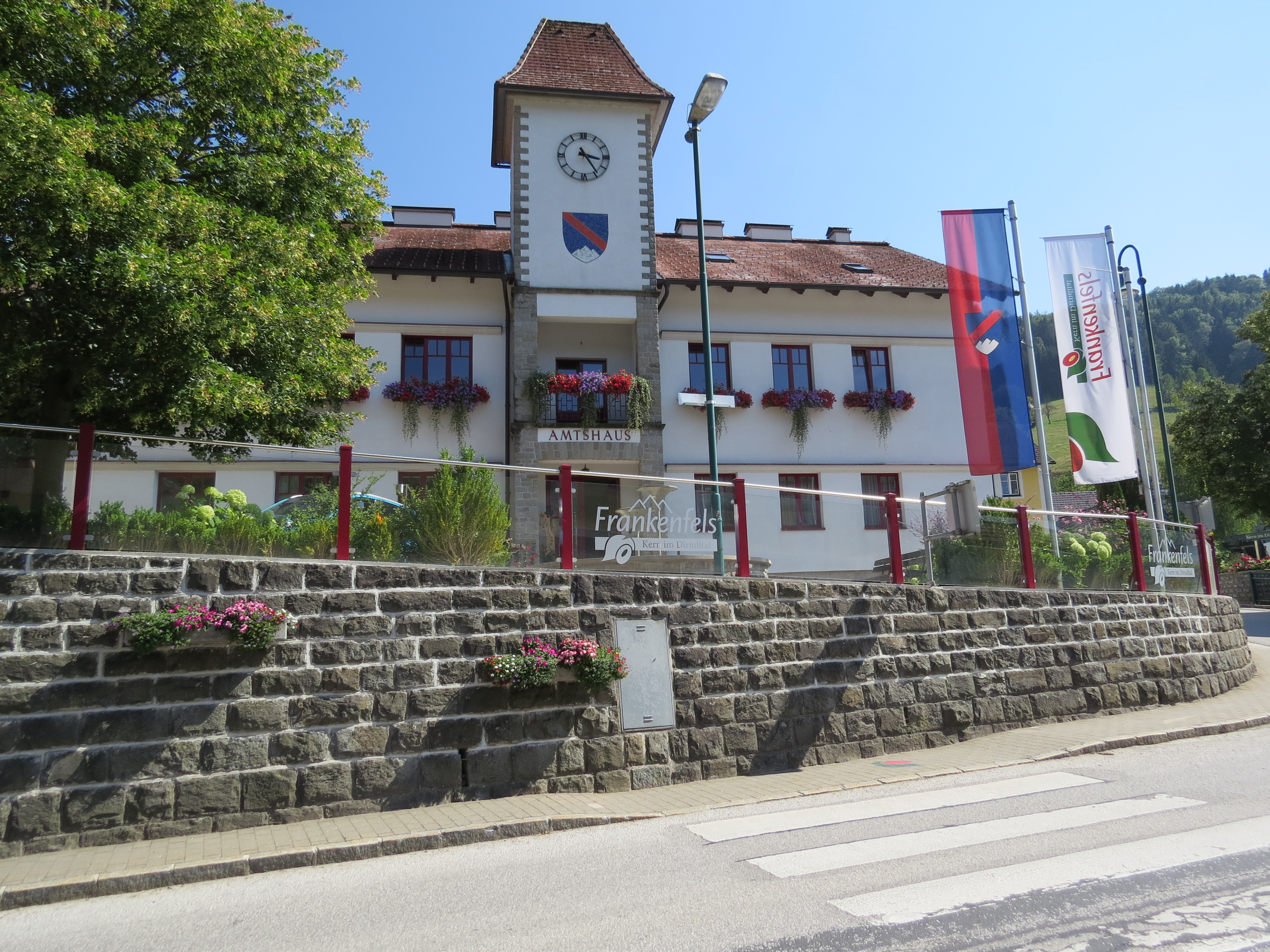
- Town hall in Frankenfels

- Coat of arms

- Location within Austria
- Coordinates: 47°58′N 15°19′E
- Country: Austria
- State: Lower Austria
- District: Sankt Pölten-Land

Government
  - Mayor: Herbert Winter (ÖVP)

Area
  - Total: 56.14 km^{2} (21.68 sq mi)
- Elevation: 464 m (1,522 ft)

Population (2018-01-01)
  - Total: 1,975
  - Density: 35.18/km^{2} (91.12/sq mi)
- Time zone: UTC+1 (CET)
  - Summer (DST): UTC+2 (CEST)
- Postal code: 3213
- Area code: 02725
- Website: http://www.frankenfels.at

Frankenfels is a market town with 1862 inhabitants (2025) in St. Pölten-Land which is a district of the state of Lower Austria, Austria.

== Population ==
Historical population
Year	Pop.	±%
1971	1,989	—
1981	2,026	+1.9%
1991	2,118	+4.5%
2001	2,187	+3.3%
2015	2,025	−7.4%
2017	1,989	−1.8%
2019	1,956	−1.7%
2025	1,862	−4.8%

== Sights ==
- The cave of Nixhöhle de
- The Falkensteinmauer de
- The Taubenbachklamm de
- The Castle Weißenburg de
- The Annakreuz de
- The Schwabeck-Kreuz (on the border of Texingtal) de
