= Lazinov =

- Municipality
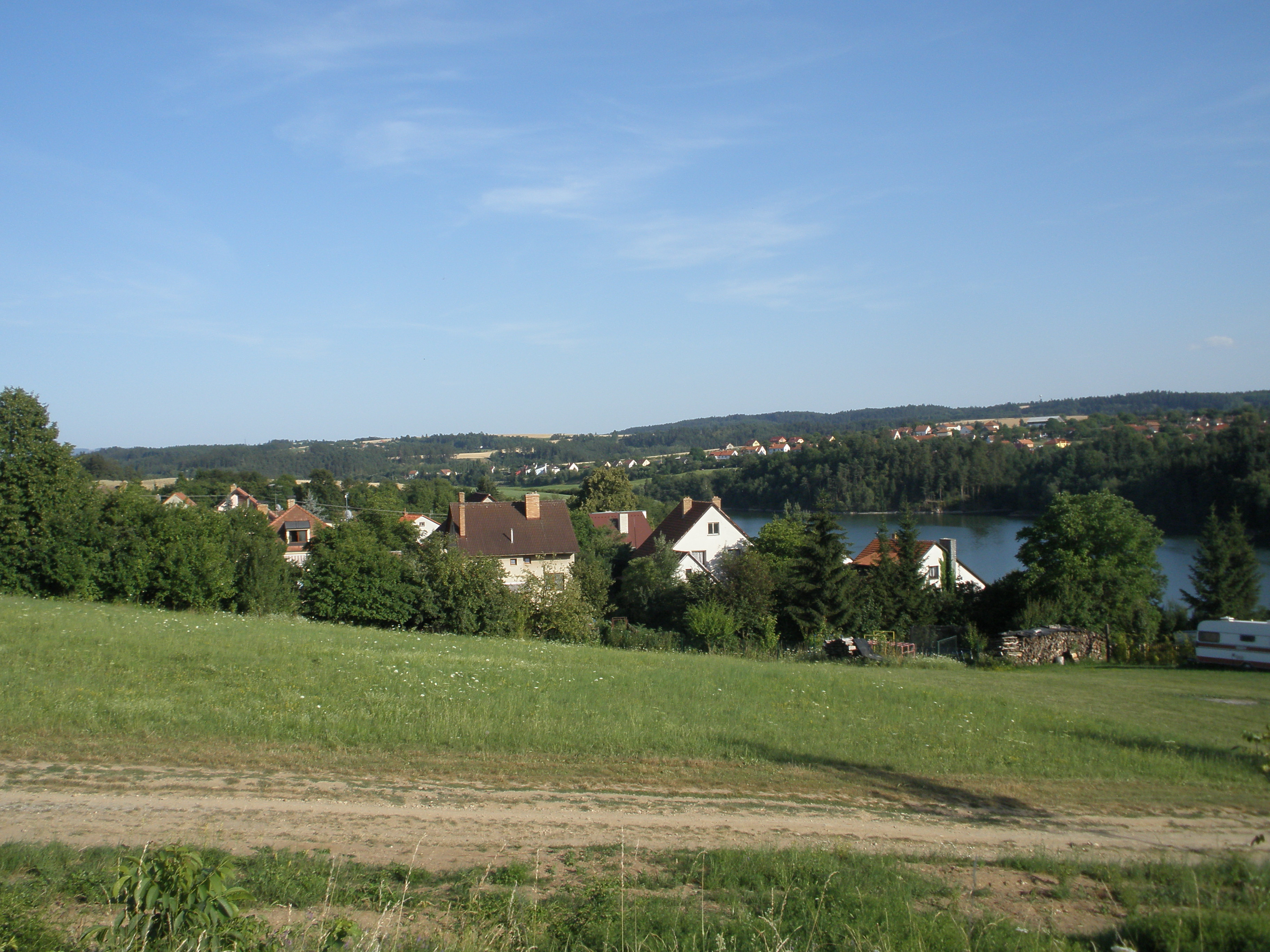
- View from the north

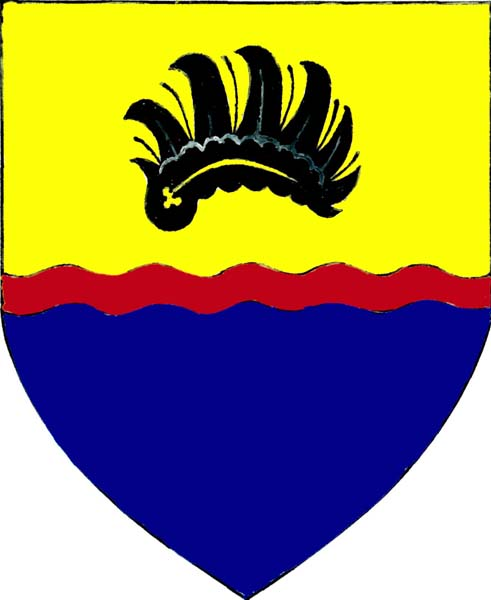
- Flag Coat of arms

- Location in the Czech Republic
- Coordinates: 49°33′50″N 16°31′24″E
- Country: Czech Republic
- Region: South Moravian
- District: Blansko
- First mentioned: 1420

Area
  - Total: 3.86 km^{2} (1.49 sq mi)
- Elevation: 402 m (1,319 ft)

Population (2026-01-01)
  - Total: 206
  - Density: 53.4/km^{2} (138/sq mi)
- Time zone: UTC+1 (CET)
  - Summer (DST): UTC+2 (CEST)
- Postal code: 679 62
- Website: www.lazinov.cz

Lazinov is a municipality and village in Blansko District in the South Moravian Region of the Czech Republic. It has about 200 inhabitants.

Lazinov lies approximately 24 kilometres (15 mi) north of Blansko, 42 km (26 mi) north of Brno, and 162 km (101 mi) east of Prague.

== Demographics ==
Historical population
| Year | Pop. | ±% |
|---|---|---|
| 1869 | 271 | — |
| 1880 | 287 | +5.9% |
| 1890 | 354 | +23.3% |
| 1900 | 352 | −0.6% |
| 1910 | 363 | +3.1% |
| 1921 | 352 | −3.0% |
| 1930 | 334 | −5.1% |
| 1950 | 290 | −13.2% |
| 1961 | 289 | −0.3% |
| 1970 | 237 | −18.0% |
| 1980 | 134 | −43.5% |
| 1991 | 146 | +9.0% |
| 2001 | 144 | −1.4% |
| 2011 | 151 | +4.9% |
| 2021 | 175 | +15.9% |
Source: Censuses
