= Křetín =

- Municipality
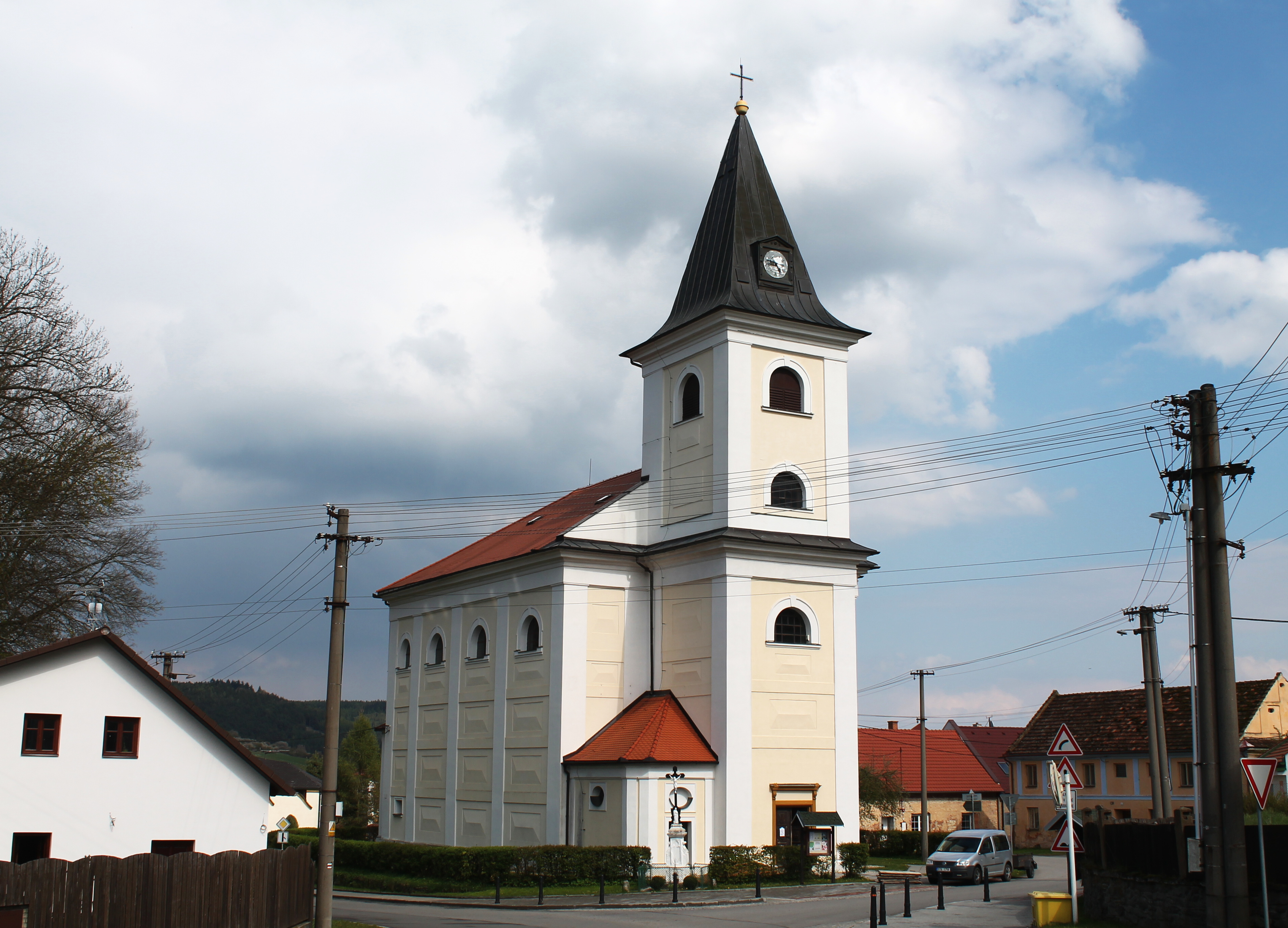
- Church of Saint Jerome

- Flag Coat of arms

- Location in the Czech Republic
- Coordinates: 49°33′47″N 16°30′16″E
- Country: Czech Republic
- Region: South Moravian
- District: Blansko
- First mentioned: 1308

Area
  - Total: 5.95 km^{2} (2.30 sq mi)
- Elevation: 393 m (1,289 ft)

Population (2026-01-01)
  - Total: 482
  - Density: 81.0/km^{2} (210/sq mi)
- Time zone: UTC+1 (CET)
  - Summer (DST): UTC+2 (CEST)
- Postal code: 679 62
- Website: www.kretin.eu

Křetín is a municipality and village in Blansko District in the South Moravian Region of the Czech Republic. It has about 500 inhabitants.

Křetín lies approximately 25 kilometres (16 mi) north-west of Blansko, 42 km (26 mi) north of Brno, and 160 km (99 mi) east of Prague.

== Administrative division ==
Křetín consists of two municipal parts (in brackets population according to the 2021 census):

- Křetín (453)
- Dolní Poříčí (33)

== Demographics ==
Historical population
Year	Pop.	±%
1869	580	—
1880	585	+0.9%
1890	614	+5.0%
1900	608	−1.0%
1910	645	+6.1%
1921	609	−5.6%
1930	576	−5.4%
1950	532	−7.6%
1961	584	+9.8%
1970	568	−2.7%
1980	552	−2.8%
1991	524	−5.1%
2001	502	−4.2%
2011	494	−1.6%
2021	486	−1.6%
Source: Censuses
