= Jedlová =

- Municipality
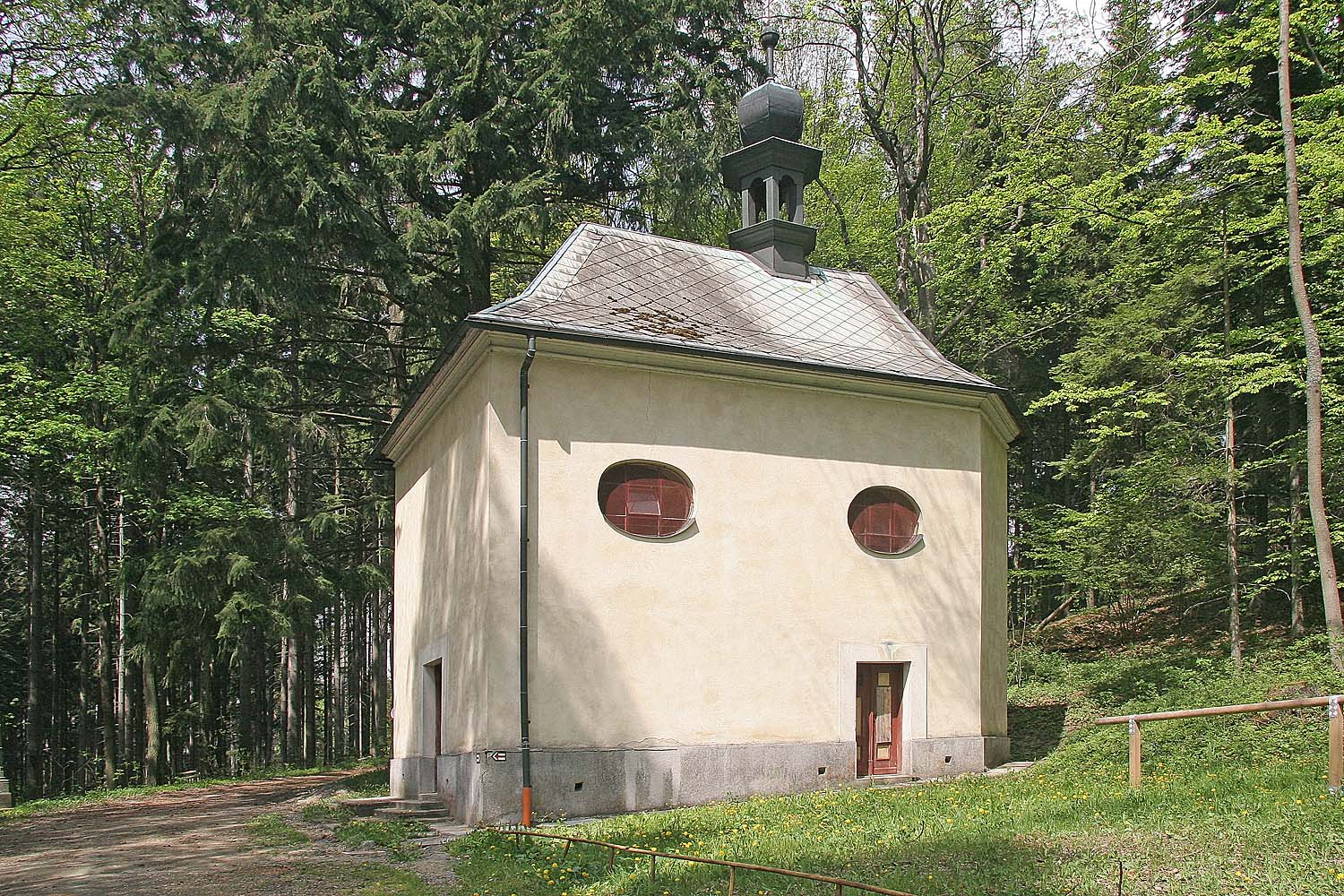
- Chapel of Our Lady of the Snow

- Flag Coat of arms

- Location in the Czech Republic
- Coordinates: 49°39′40″N 16°18′22″E
- Country: Czech Republic
- Region: Pardubice
- District: Svitavy
- First mentioned: 1349

Area
  - Total: 23.04 km^{2} (8.90 sq mi)
- Elevation: 590 m (1,940 ft)

Population (2026-01-01)
  - Total: 1,106
  - Density: 48.00/km^{2} (124.3/sq mi)
- Time zone: UTC+1 (CET)
  - Summer (DST): UTC+2 (CEST)
- Postal code: 569 91
- Website: www.jedlova.com

Jedlová (German: Schönbrunn) is a municipality and village in Svitavy District in the Pardubice Region of the Czech Republic. It has about 1,100 inhabitants.

Jedlová lies approximately 15 kilometres (9 mi) south-west of Svitavy, 58 km (36 mi) south-east of Pardubice, and 145 km (90 mi) east of Prague.

== Demographics ==
Historical population
Year	Pop.	±%
1869	1,919	—
1880	2,031	+5.8%
1890	2,032	+0.0%
1900	2,115	+4.1%
1910	2,073	−2.0%
1921	1,946	−6.1%
1930	1,967	+1.1%
1950	1,298	−34.0%
1961	1,327	+2.2%
1970	1,155	−13.0%
1980	1,111	−3.8%
1991	1,088	−2.1%
2001	1,014	−6.8%
2011	992	−2.2%
2021	1,020	+2.8%
Source: Censuses
