= Stašov (Svitavy District) =

- Municipality
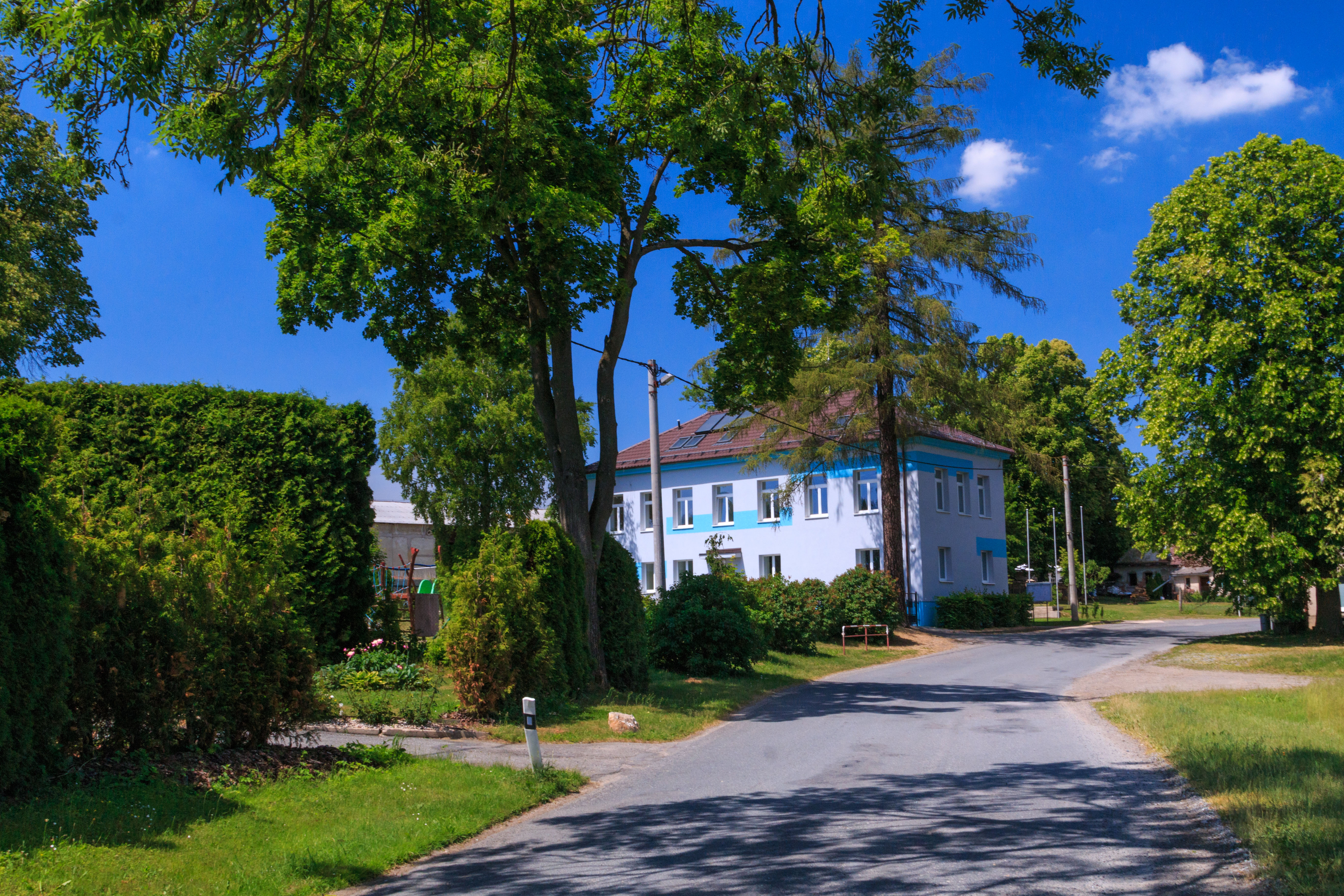
- Municipal office

- Flag Coat of arms

- Location in the Czech Republic
- Coordinates: 49°40′30″N 16°22′8″E
- Country: Czech Republic
- Region: Pardubice
- District: Svitavy
- First mentioned: 1557

Area
  - Total: 13.26 km^{2} (5.12 sq mi)
- Elevation: 585 m (1,919 ft)

Population (2026-01-01)
  - Total: 277
  - Density: 20.9/km^{2} (54.1/sq mi)
- Time zone: UTC+1 (CET)
  - Summer (DST): UTC+2 (CEST)
- Postal code: 572 01
- Website: www.obec-stasov.cz

Stašov (German: Dittersbach) is a municipality and village in Svitavy District in the Pardubice Region of the Czech Republic. It has about 300 inhabitants.

Stašov lies approximately 12 kilometres (7 mi) south-west of Svitavy, 59 km (37 mi) south-east of Pardubice, and 147 km (91 mi) east of Prague.

== Demographics ==
Historical population
Year	Pop.	±%
1869	1,304	—
1880	1,229	−5.8%
1890	1,244	+1.2%
1900	1,253	+0.7%
1910	1,181	−5.7%
1921	1,090	−7.7%
1930	933	−14.4%
1950	344	−63.1%
1961	363	+5.5%
1970	307	−15.4%
1980	277	−9.8%
1991	260	−6.1%
2001	258	−0.8%
2011	226	−12.4%
2021	242	+7.1%
Source: Censuses
