= Bystré (Svitavy District) =

- Town
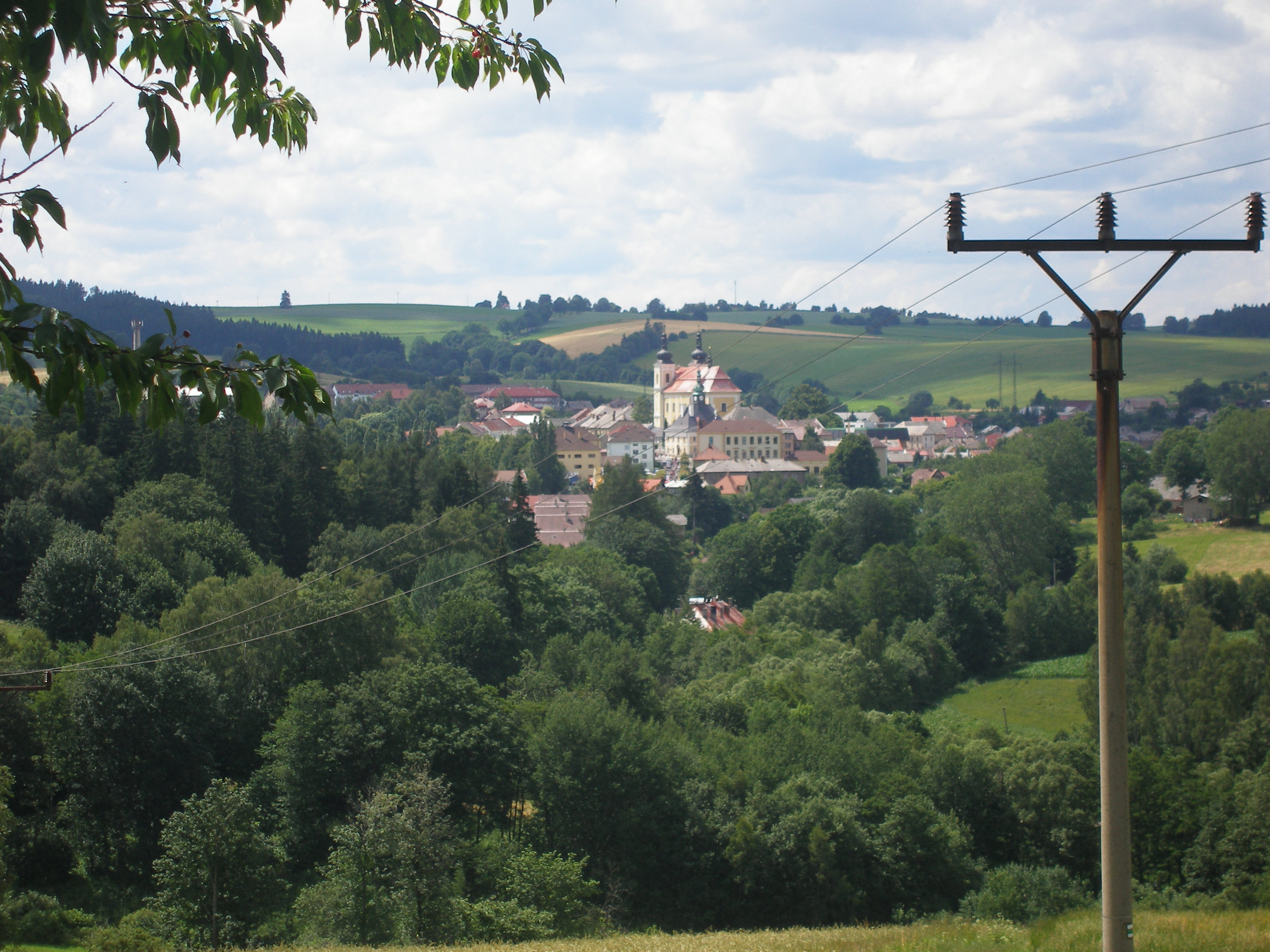
- Bystré as seen from Hartmanice

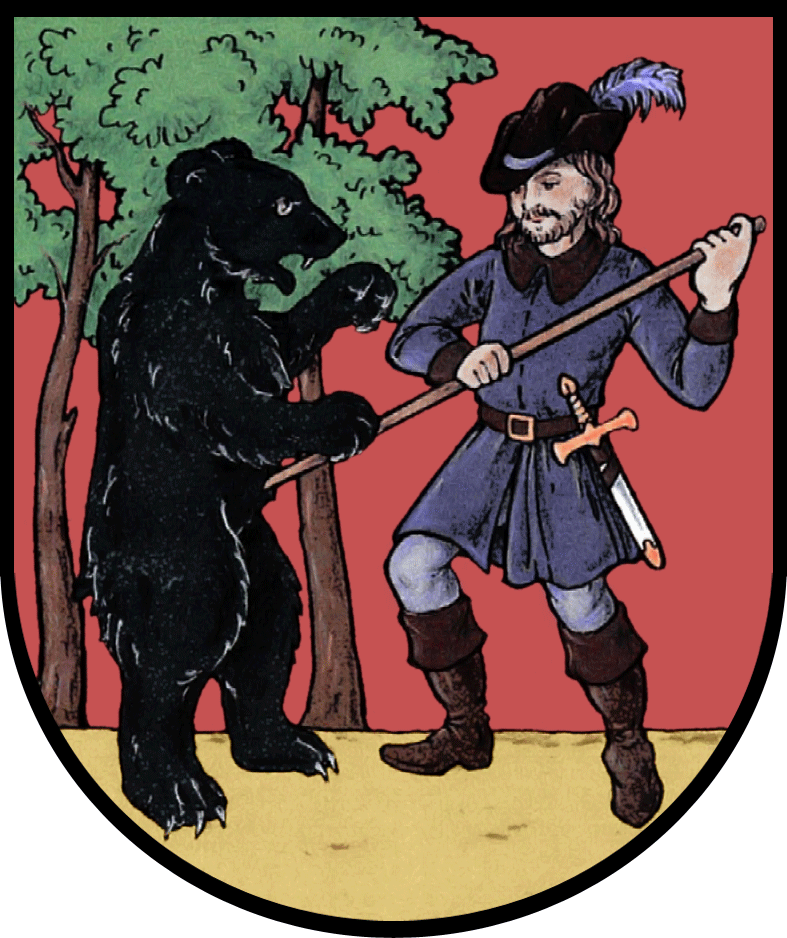
- Flag Coat of arms

- Location in the Czech Republic
- Coordinates: 49°37′42″N 16°20′49″E
- Country: Czech Republic
- Region: Pardubice
- District: Svitavy
- First mentioned: 1200

Area
  - Total: 14.10 km^{2} (5.44 sq mi)
- Elevation: 604 m (1,982 ft)

Population (2026-01-01)
  - Total: 1,561
  - Density: 110.7/km^{2} (286.7/sq mi)
- Time zone: UTC+1 (CET)
  - Summer (DST): UTC+2 (CEST)
- Postal code: 569 92
- Website: www.bystre.cz

Bystré (Czech pronunciation: [ˈbɪstrɛː]; German: Bistrau) is a town in Svitavy District in the Pardubice Region of the Czech Republic. It has about 1,600 inhabitants. The town is located in the Upper Svratka Highlands.

Bystré existed already in the 11th century and became a town in the 14th century. The historic town centre is well preserved and is protected as an urban monument zone. The main landmark is the Church of Saint John the Baptist and Our Lady of Mount Carmel.

== Administrative division ==
Bystré consists of two municipal parts (in brackets population according to the 2021 census):

- Bystré (1,426)
- Hamry (37)

== Etymology ==
The adjective bystrý ('fast-flowing', 'rapid' in older Czech) was often included in the names of streams. This also applied to the local stream, from which the name was transferred to the settlement.

== Geography ==
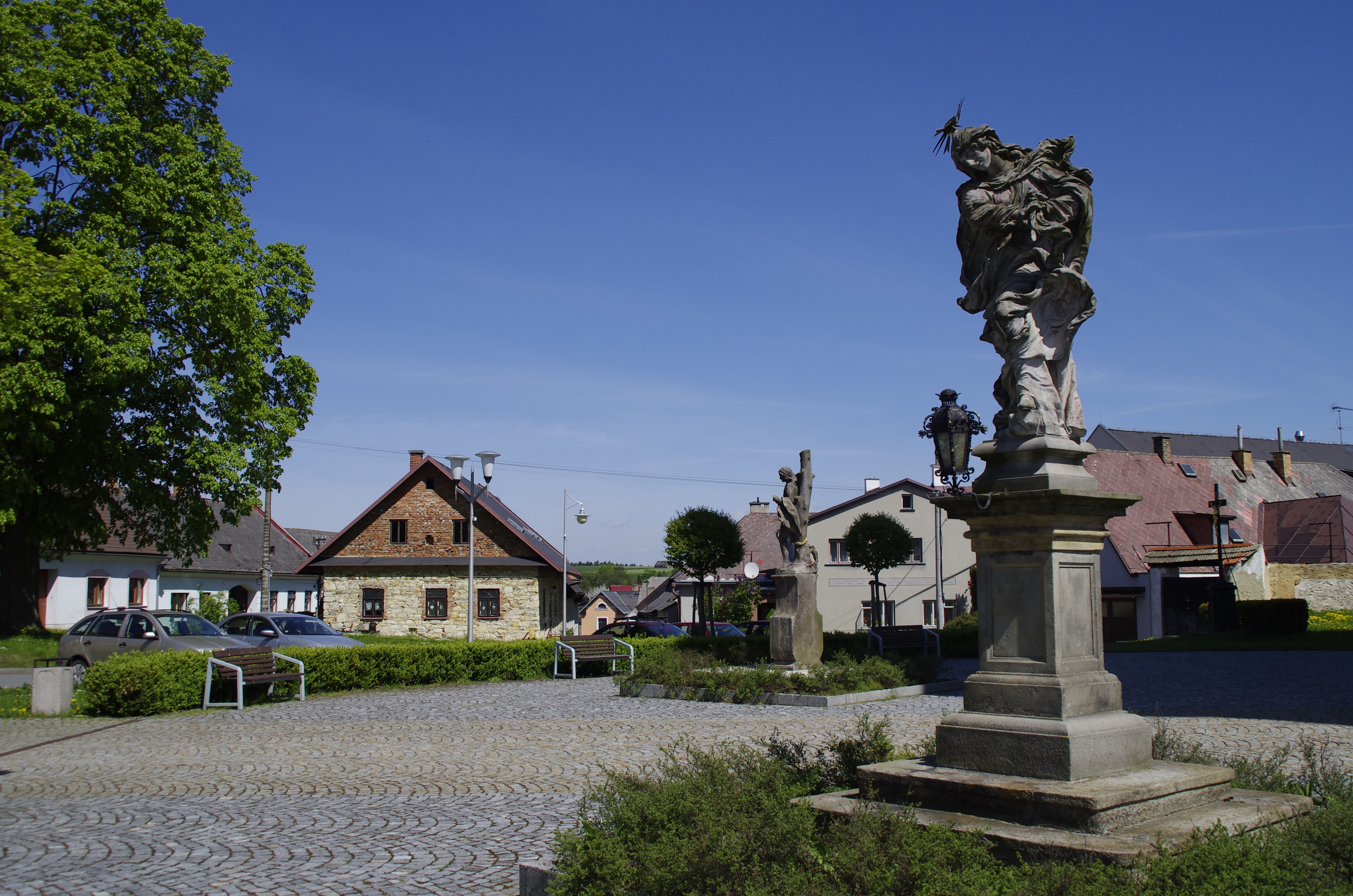
Town square

Bystré is located about 16 kilometres (10 mi) southwest of Svitavy and 48 km (30 mi) north of Brno. It lies in the Upper Svratka Highlands. The highest point is at 729 m (2,392 ft) above sea level. The stream Bysterský potok originates here and then flows through the town. The Křetínka River flows through the eastern part of the municipal territory, through the village of Hamry.

== History ==
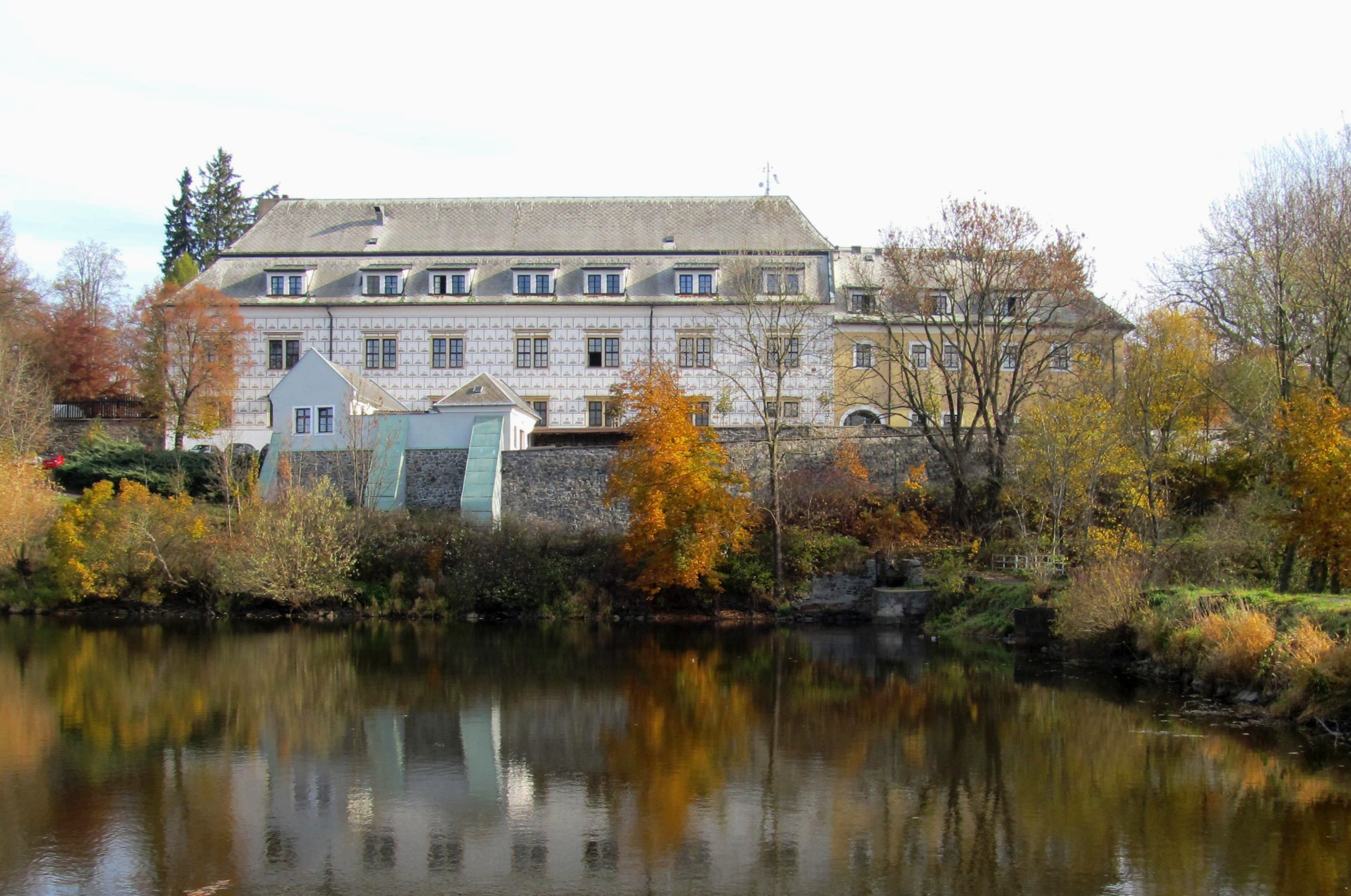
Bystré Castle

The first written mention of Bystré is from 1200 in the chronicle written by Wenceslaus Hajek, where it is written about Bystré in the year 1021 or 1098. The chronicle is not considered a credible source, however archaeological excavations show that Bystré did exist already in the 11th century.

Until 1213, Bystré was owned by the Mokrošínský family, who extended the settlement and had built a square shaped as a horseshoe. From 1213, the village belonged to the Svojanov estate, later owned by Záviš of Falkenstein. After his death, Bystré became a property of the royal chamber. Bystré received the town rights during the reign of King Charles IV.

In the 15th century, it became property of the Svojanovský of Boskovice family. In 1507, the town gained a number of privileges, such as toll collection right and the right for a weekly market. Sometime during the 16th century, a small hunting fortress was built. Jan Bezdružický of Kolowrat became the town owner in the 1580s. In 1586–1590, he had built a new Renaissance castle. Jan died in 1604 and was buried in a tomb in the local church.

The following owners, the Martinic family, started mining of iron ore in Hamry (currently a part of the municipality of Bystré). During the Thirty Years' War, the town was devastated. Jan Pavel of Walderode bought the Bystré estate in 1686. In 1707, the estate was sold again, this time in an auction to the count of Liechtenstein who exchanged it with Jakub Hanibal, the Count of Hohenems, in 1710. Jakub Hanibal had built the town hall. During the rule of his son, Franz Rudolph, the construction of a new church started and spa Balda was founded in the neighbourhood. As the Counts of Hohenems died out in 1869, the Bystré estate was passed to Emperor Franz Joseph I who owned it until the establishment of Czechoslovakia in 1918.

== Demographics ==
Historical population

Year	Pop.	±%
1869	2,305	—
1880	2,270	−1.5%
1890	2,251	−0.8%
1900	2,269	+0.8%
1910	2,386	+5.2%

Year	Pop.	±%
1921	2,068	−13.3%
1930	1,981	−4.2%
1950	1,442	−27.2%
1961	1,523	+5.6%
1970	1,496	−1.8%

Year	Pop.	±%
1980	1,576	+5.3%
1991	1,602	+1.6%
2001	1,692	+5.6%
2011	1,581	−6.6%
2021	1,463	−7.5%

Source: Censuses

== Transport ==
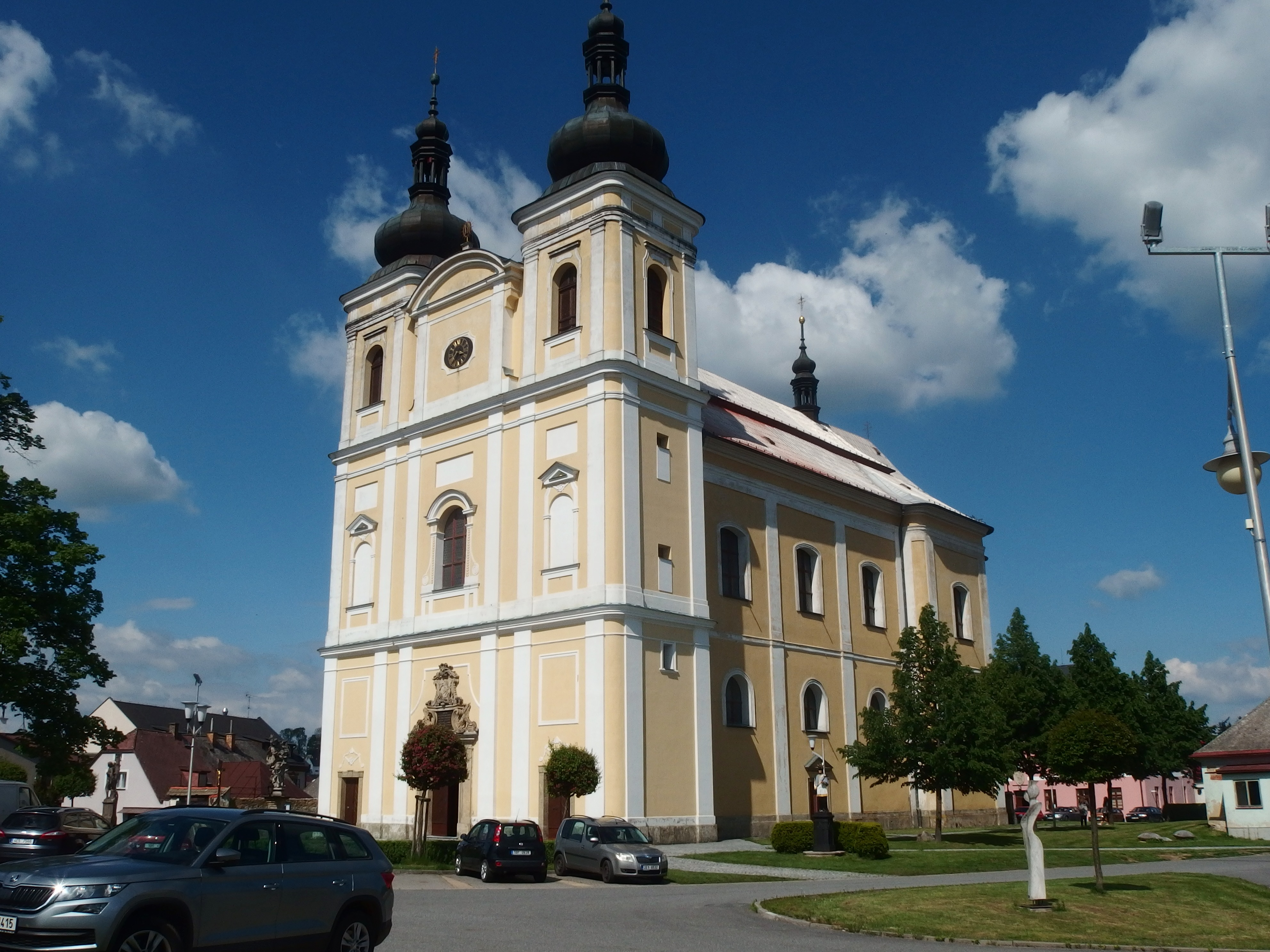
Church of Saint John the Baptist and Our Lady of Mount Carmel

There are no railways or major roads passing through the municipal territory.

== Sights ==
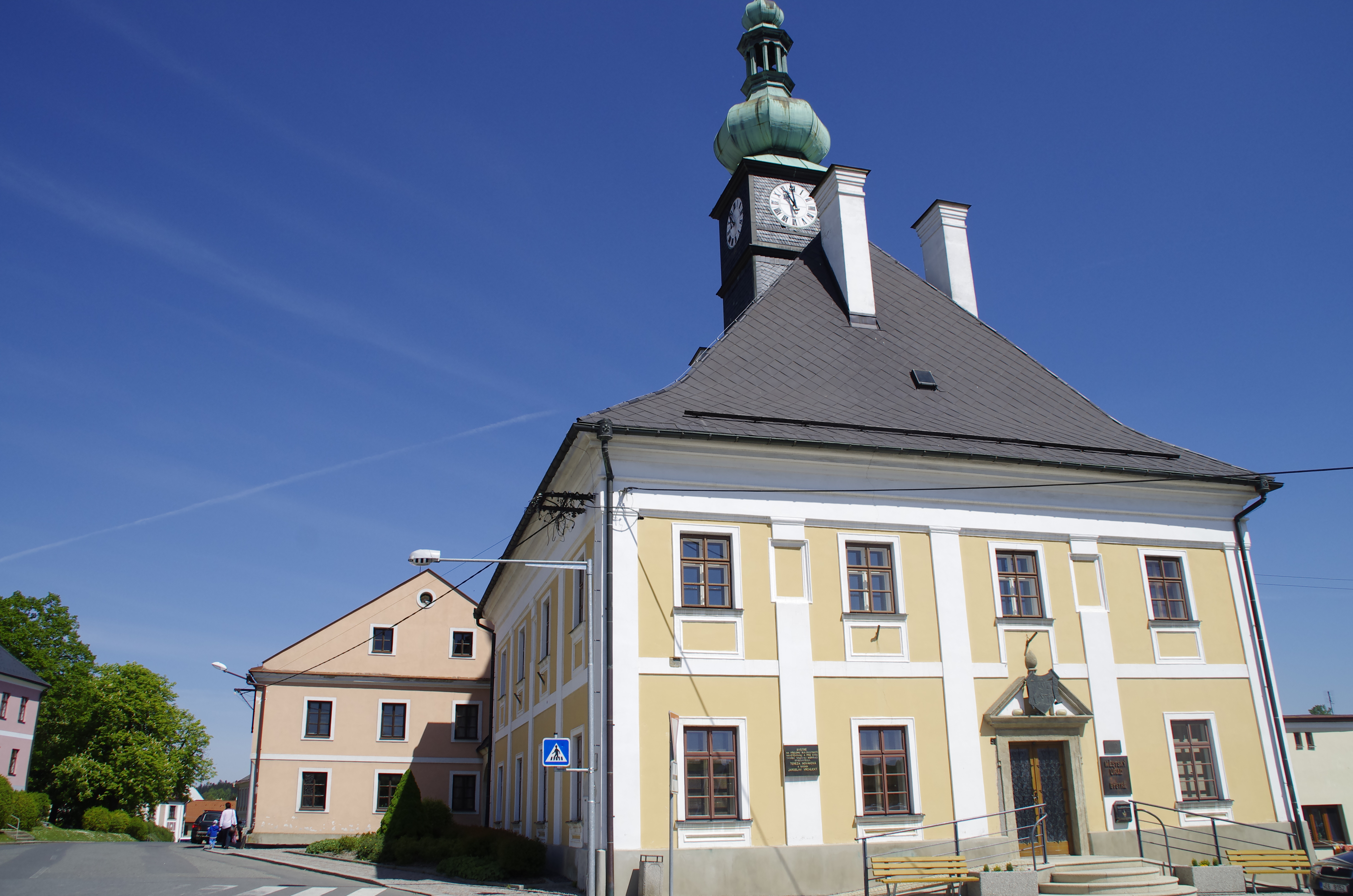
Town hall

The Church of Saint John the Baptist and Our Lady of Mount Carmel in one of the largest Baroque churches in the region. It was originally built in the 12th century and rebuilt in 1601. The current appearance is after reconstructions in the 1720s. Its rarity is the decoration, which is exclusively wood. The nearby rectory was built in 1690–1692.

The Baroque town hall built in 1716–1719 is unique with its high gabled roof and clock tower in all four directions.

The Bystré Castle is one of the main landmarks in the town. Nowadays the premises of the castle houses social care institute and special primary school. It includes a large castle park open to the public.

The Brtoun's Cottage is a preserved folk architecture house built in 1723. It contains a small museum with an exposition of handmade shoemaking.

== In popular culture ==
Vojtěch Jasný's movie All My Compatriots was in 1968 filmed in Bystré and its surroundings. Also the filming of a stand-alone sequel Návrat ztraceného ráje partially took place in Bystré in 1999.

== Twin towns – sister cities ==
Bystré is twinned with:

- Hohenems, Austria
