= Rohozná (Jihlava District) =

- Municipality
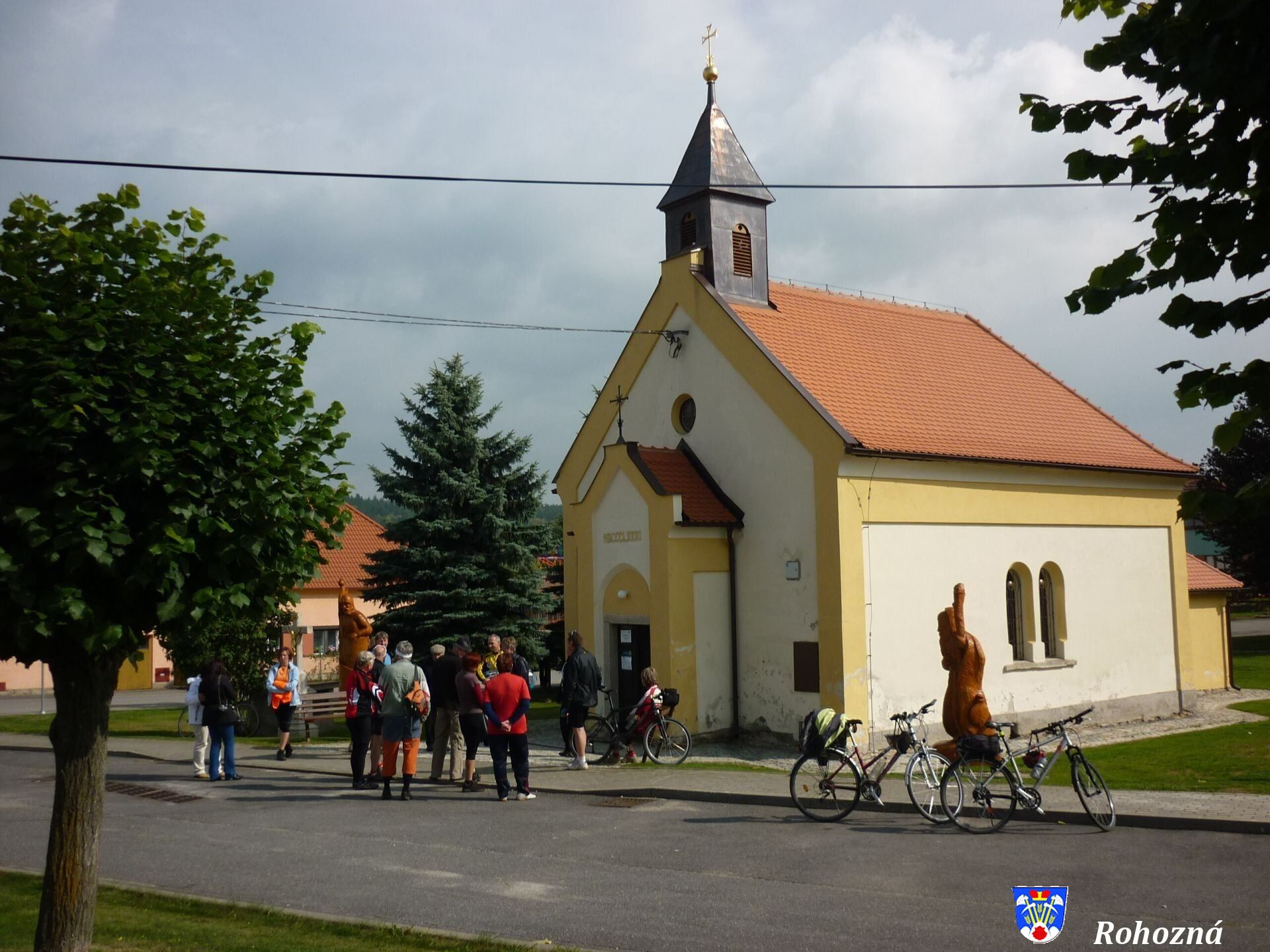
- Chapel of Saint Wenceslaus

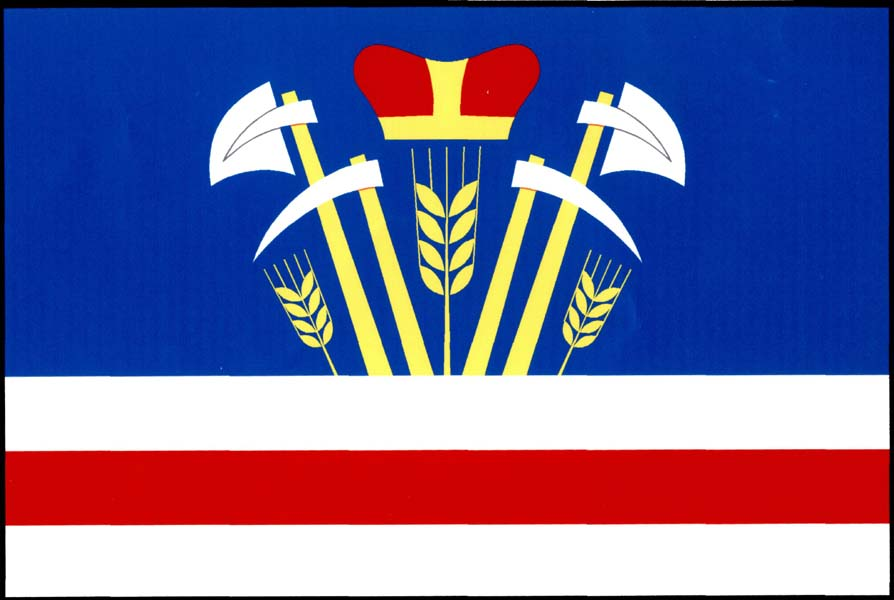
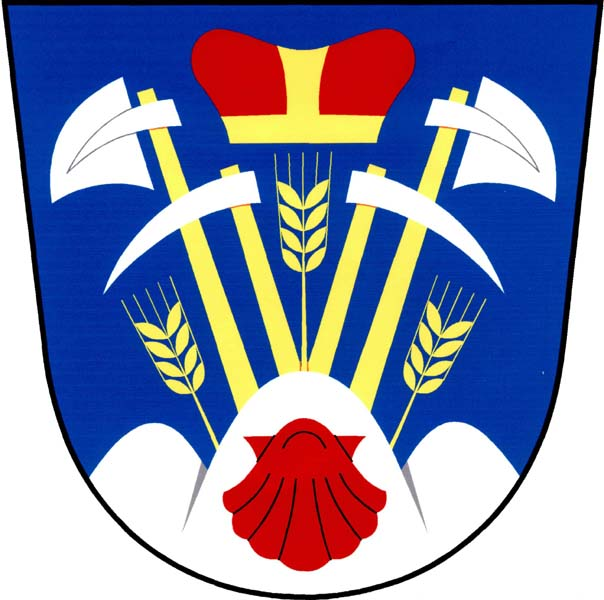
- Flag Coat of arms

- Location in the Czech Republic
- Coordinates: 49°21′0″N 15°23′57″E
- Country: Czech Republic
- Region: Vysočina
- District: Jihlava
- First mentioned: 1370

Area
  - Total: 11.44 km^{2} (4.42 sq mi)
- Elevation: 554 m (1,818 ft)

Population (2026-01-01)
  - Total: 413
  - Density: 36.1/km^{2} (93.5/sq mi)
- Time zone: UTC+1 (CET)
  - Summer (DST): UTC+2 (CEST)
- Postal code: 588 44
- Website: www.obec-rohozna.cz

Rohozná (Czech pronunciation: [ˈroɦoznaː]) is a municipality and village in Jihlava District in the Vysočina Region of the Czech Republic. It has about 400 inhabitants.

Rohozná lies approximately 16 kilometres (10 mi) west of Jihlava and 108 km (67 mi) south-east of Prague.

== Demographics ==
Historical population
Year	Pop.	±%
1869	860	—
1880	941	+9.4%
1890	911	−3.2%
1900	873	−4.2%
1910	868	−0.6%
1921	915	+5.4%
1930	805	−12.0%
1950	593	−26.3%
1961	596	+0.5%
1970	473	−20.6%
1980	438	−7.4%
1991	373	−14.8%
2001	357	−4.3%
2011	374	+4.8%
2021	397	+6.1%
Source: Censuses
