= Lokator =

Medieval surveyor

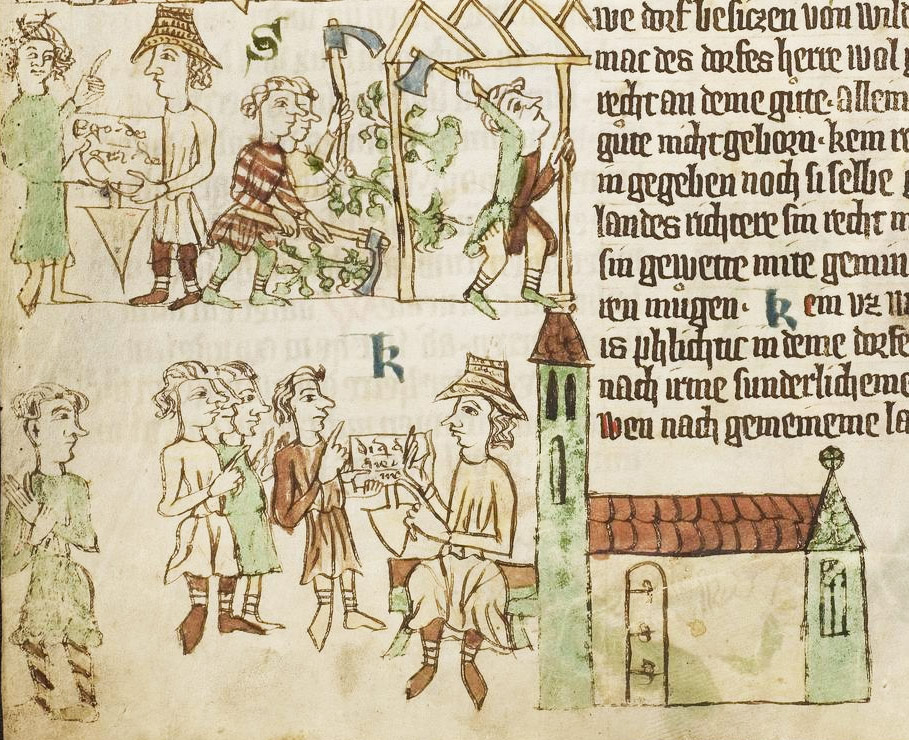
A scene from the Sachsenspiegel shows a lokator (in hat) during the German Ostsiedlung around 1300

The lokator (lat. locator: landlord, land allocator, from Latin (col)locare to allocate, rent, establish, settle or locate; also magister incolarum; in Mecklenburg and Pomerania also posessor or cultor, similar to the Reutemeister in South Germany) was a medieval sub-contractor, who was responsible to a territorial lord or landlord for the clearing, survey and apportionment of land that was to be settled. In addition, he hired settlers for this purpose, provided their means of subsistence during the transitional period (e.g. during the clearing of the land) and made materiel and implements available, such as seed, draught animals, iron ploughs, etc. He thus played a key role during the establishment of new towns and villages, as well as the clearing of uncultivated land during the phase of internal colonisation (Binnenkolonisation) in North Germany and the German Ostsiedlung and participated in its success.
