= Rohozná (Svitavy District) =

- Municipality
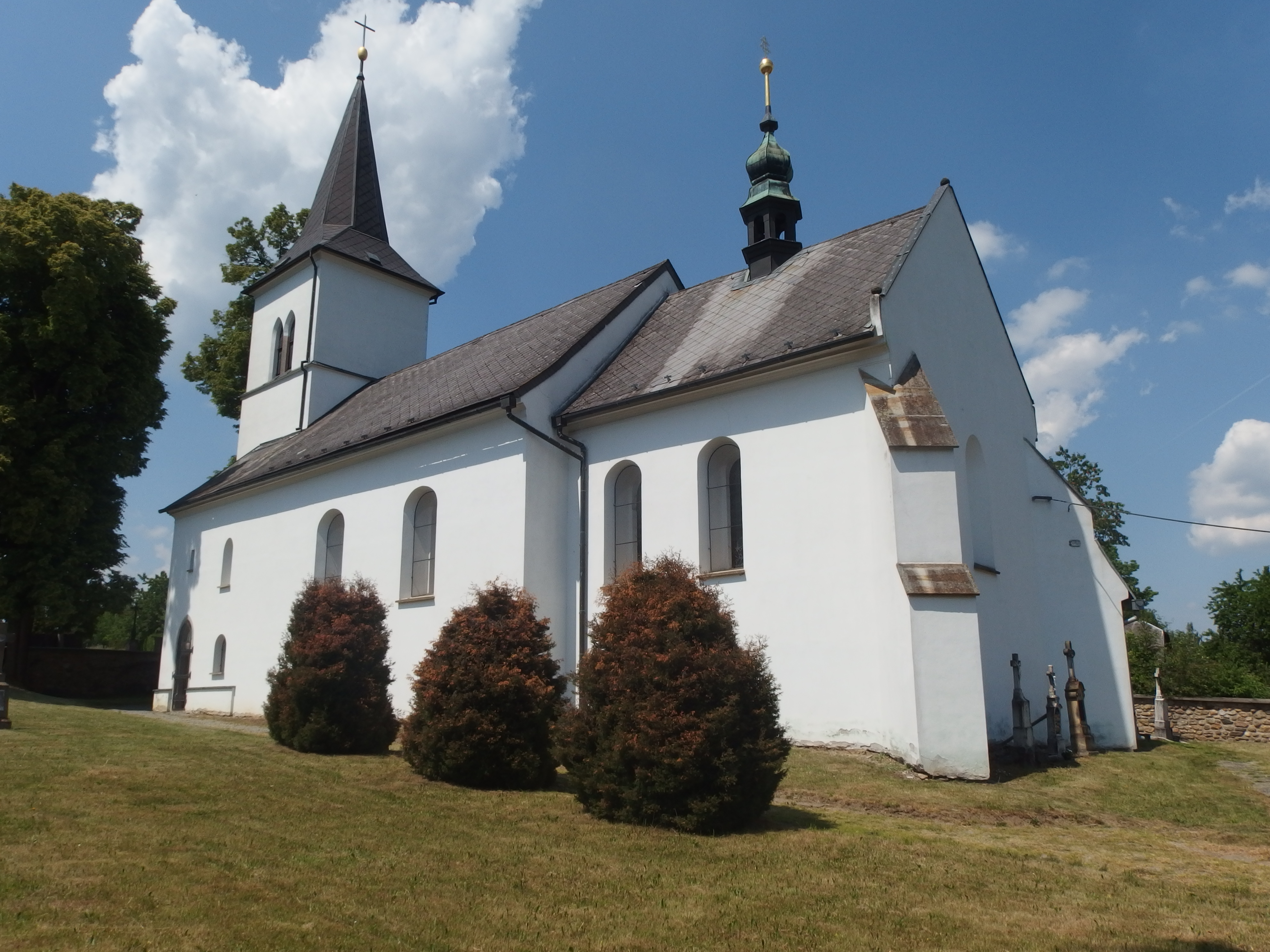
- Church of Saint Erasmus

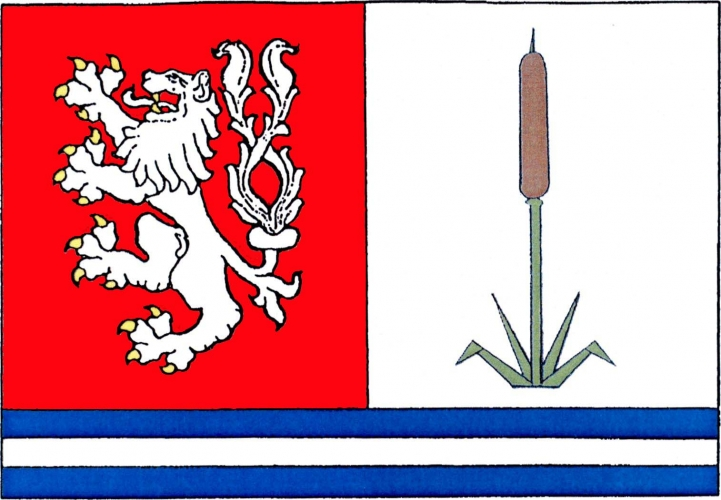
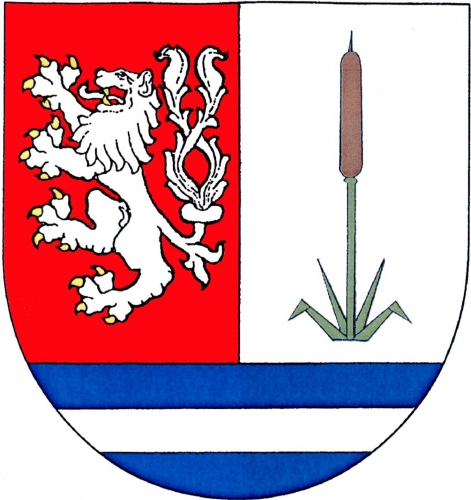
- Flag Coat of arms

- Location in the Czech Republic
- Coordinates: 49°39′13″N 16°24′29″E
- Country: Czech Republic
- Region: Pardubice
- District: Svitavy
- First mentioned: 1349

Area
  - Total: 11.78 km^{2} (4.55 sq mi)
- Elevation: 575 m (1,886 ft)

Population (2026-01-01)
  - Total: 646
  - Density: 54.8/km^{2} (142/sq mi)
- Time zone: UTC+1 (CET)
  - Summer (DST): UTC+2 (CEST)
- Postal codes: 569 72, 569 92
- Website: www.rohozna.cz

Rohozná is a municipality and village in Svitavy District in the Pardubice Region of the Czech Republic. It has about 600 inhabitants.

Rohozná lies approximately 12 kilometres (7 mi) south-west of Svitavy, 62 km (39 mi) south-east of Pardubice, and 150 km (93 mi) east of Prague.

== Administrative division ==
Rohozná consists of two municipal parts (in brackets population according to the 2021 census):

- Rohozná (589)
- Manova Lhota (17)

== Demographics ==
Historical population
Year	Pop.	±%
1869	1,785	—
1880	1,828	+2.4%
1890	1,872	+2.4%
1900	2,055	+9.8%
1910	2,197	+6.9%
1921	2,054	−6.5%
1930	2,026	−1.4%
1950	1,161	−42.7%
1961	1,251	+7.8%
1970	1,141	−8.8%
1980	956	−16.2%
1991	763	−20.2%
2001	715	−6.3%
2011	657	−8.1%
2021	606	−7.8%
Source: Censuses
