= Horní Poříčí (Blansko District) =

- Municipality
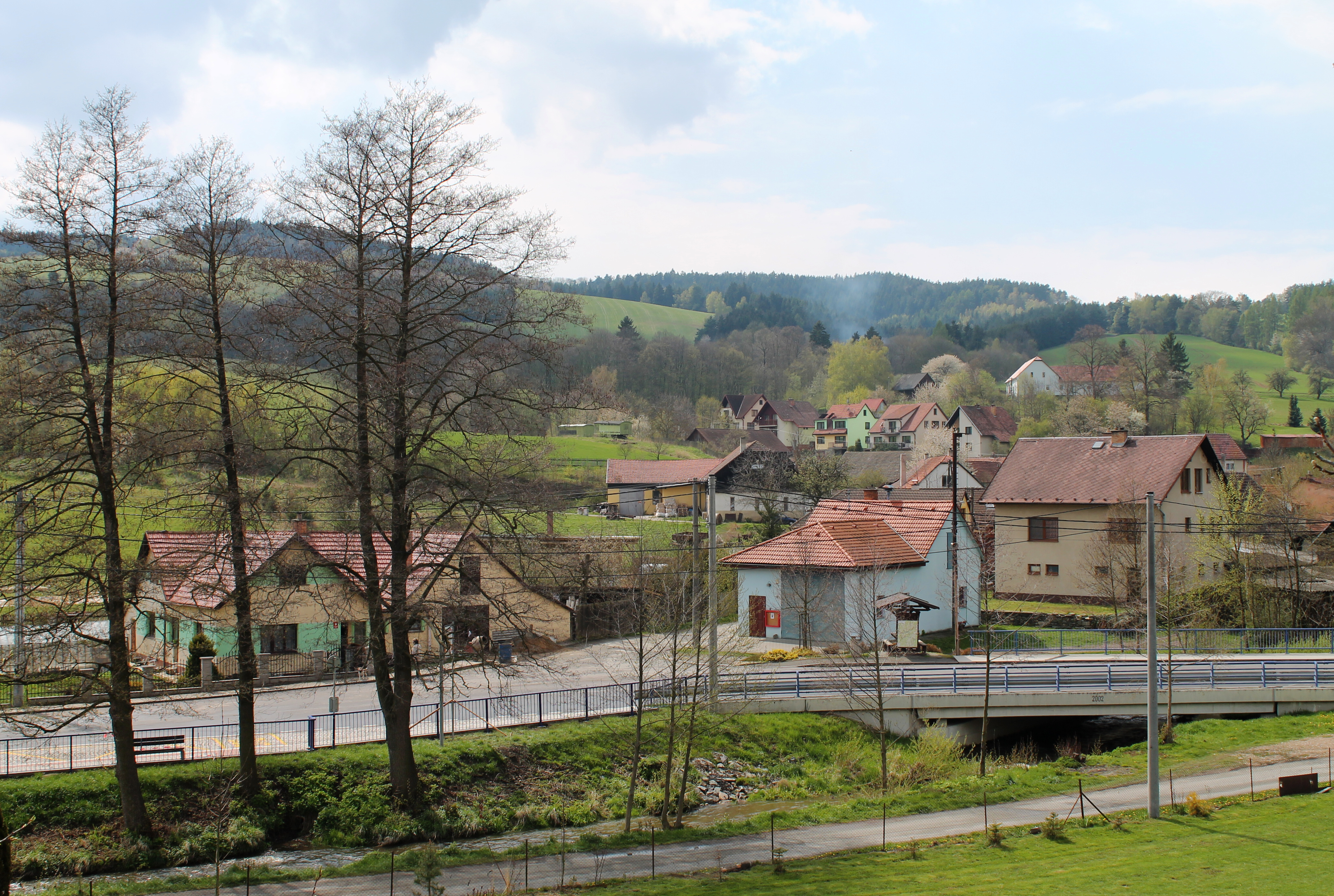
- General view

- Flag Coat of arms

- Location in the Czech Republic
- Coordinates: 49°35′15″N 16°28′39″E
- Country: Czech Republic
- Region: South Moravian
- District: Blansko
- First mentioned: 1591

Area
  - Total: 5.06 km^{2} (1.95 sq mi)
- Elevation: 385 m (1,263 ft)

Population (2026-01-01)
  - Total: 258
  - Density: 51.0/km^{2} (132/sq mi)
- Time zone: UTC+1 (CET)
  - Summer (DST): UTC+2 (CEST)
- Postal code: 679 62
- Website: horniporici.eu

Horní Poříčí is a municipality and village in Blansko District in the South Moravian Region of the Czech Republic. It has about 300 inhabitants.

Horní Poříčí lies approximately 28 kilometres (17 mi) north-west of Blansko, 45 km (28 mi) north of Brno, and 158 km (98 mi) east of Prague.

== Demographics ==
Historical population
Year	Pop.	±%
1869	436	—
1880	441	+1.1%
1890	411	−6.8%
1900	486	+18.2%
1910	496	+2.1%
1921	500	+0.8%
1930	518	+3.6%
1950	413	−20.3%
1961	414	+0.2%
1970	391	−5.6%
1980	333	−14.8%
1991	300	−9.9%
2001	279	−7.0%
2011	278	−0.4%
2021	261	−6.1%
Source: Censuses
