= Letovice =

- Town
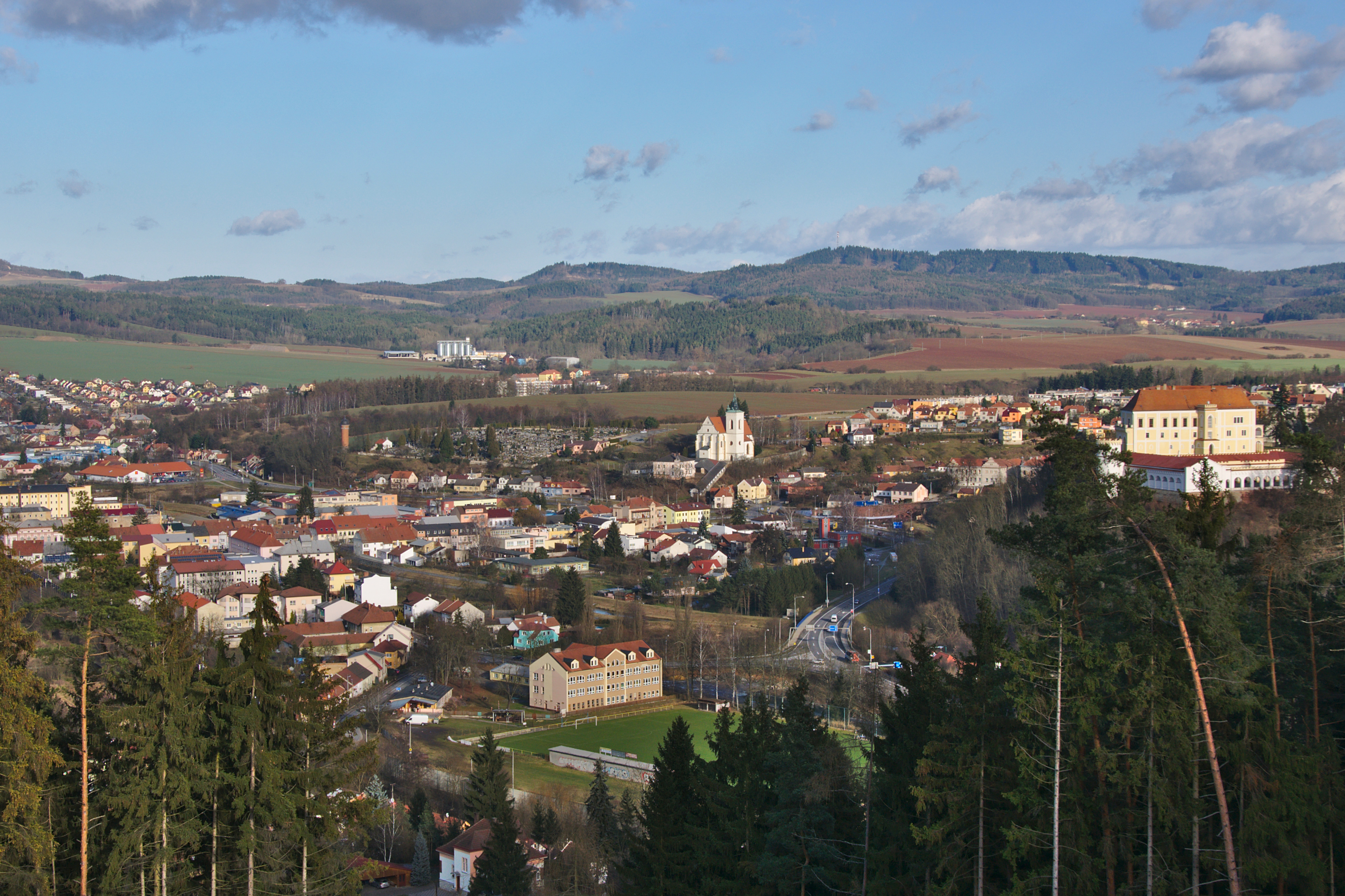
- View from the west

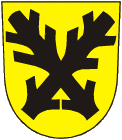
- Flag Coat of arms

- Location in the Czech Republic
- Coordinates: 49°32′50″N 16°34′25″E
- Country: Czech Republic
- Region: South Moravian
- District: Blansko
- First mentioned: 1145

Government
  - Mayor: Petr Novotný

Area
  - Total: 51.01 km^{2} (19.70 sq mi)
- Elevation: 330 m (1,080 ft)

Population (2026-01-01)
  - Total: 7,071
  - Density: 138.6/km^{2} (359.0/sq mi)
- Time zone: UTC+1 (CET)
  - Summer (DST): UTC+2 (CEST)
- Postal code: 679 61
- Website: www.letovice.net

Letovice (Czech pronunciation: [ˈlɛtovɪtsɛ]; German: Lettowitz) is a town in Blansko District in the South Moravian Region of the Czech Republic. It has about 7,100 inhabitants. The town is located at the confluence of the rivers Svitava and Křetínka. The main landmark is the Letovice Castle.

== Administrative division ==
Letovice consists of 17 municipal parts (in brackets population according to the 2021 census):

- Letovice (4,210)
- Babolky (50)
- Chlum (49)
- Dolní Smržov (112)
- Jasinov (96)
- Kladoruby (214)
- Klevetov (29)
- Kněževísko (35)
- Kochov (92)
- Lhota (55)
- Meziříčko (190)
- Novičí (82)
- Podolí (83)
- Slatinka (71)
- Třebětín (1,008)
- Zábludov (102)
- Zboněk (126)

== Geography ==
Letovice is located about 21 kilometres (13 mi) north of Blansko and 37 km (23 mi) north of Brno. It lies mostly in the Boskovice Furrow. The highest point is the hill Ve Vrších at 590 m (1,940 ft) above sea level. The town is situated in the valley of the Svitava River, at its confluence with the Křetínka River. West of the town is the Letovice Reservoir, built on the Křetínka.

== History ==
The first written mention of Letovice is from 1145. Until the 14th century, Letovice was owned by a local noble family that called themselves the Lords of Letovice. In the 14th century, Letovice was acquired by the Lords of Ronov family. During the Hussite Wars in 1424, the Hussites conquered the Letovice Castle. After the war, the Letovice estate was divided into two parts, which were gradually acquired by the Lords of Boskovice.

In 1544, the Letovice estate was sold to the Hardek family. They began to spread Lutheranism here and Germanised the town. Count Jindřich Václav Thurn acquired Letovice by marriage in 1614. During the Thirty Years' War in 1643, the local castle was captured by the Swedish army. The next owners of the town were the Szelepcsényi family. During their rule, at the end of the 17th century, the castle was rebuilt in the early Baroque style. The estate then changed owners frequently until it was acquired in 1724 by the Blümegen family, during whose rule the town grew economically. From 1820 to 1945, the estate belonged to the Hungarian Kálnoky family.

== Demographics ==
Historical population

Year	Pop.	±%
1869	5,152	—
1880	5,054	−1.9%
1890	5,561	+10.0%
1900	6,121	+10.1%
1910	6,850	+11.9%

Year	Pop.	±%
1921	6,562	−4.2%
1930	6,468	−1.4%
1950	6,196	−4.2%
1961	6,336	+2.3%
1970	6,483	+2.3%

Year	Pop.	±%
1980	6,811	+5.1%
1991	6,608	−3.0%
2001	6,640	+0.5%
2011	6,637	−0.0%
2021	6,604	−0.5%

Source: Censuses

== Transport ==
The I/43 road (part of the European route E461) from Brno to Svitavy runs through the market town.

Letovice is located on the railway line Prague–Brno.

== Sights ==
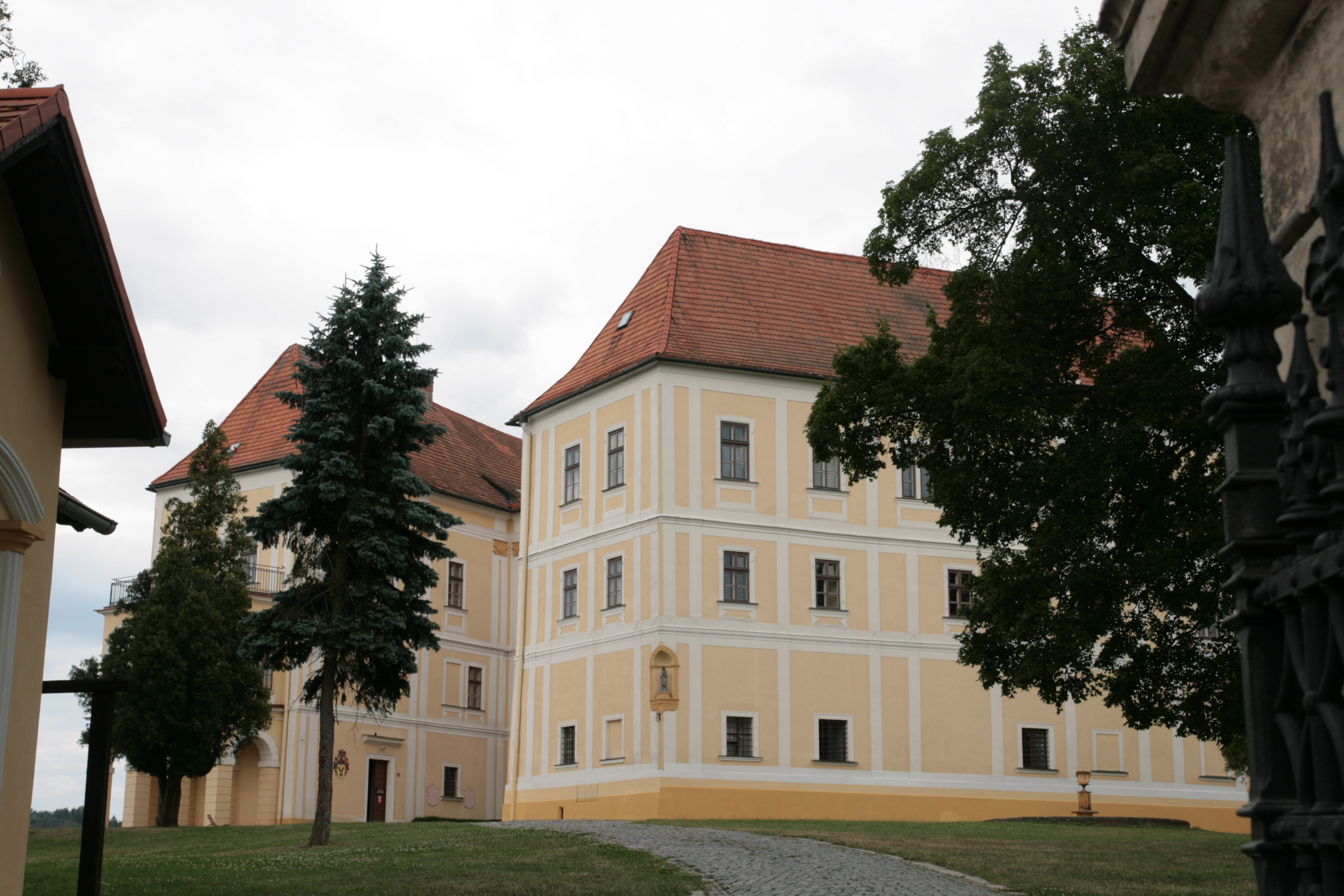
Letovice Castle

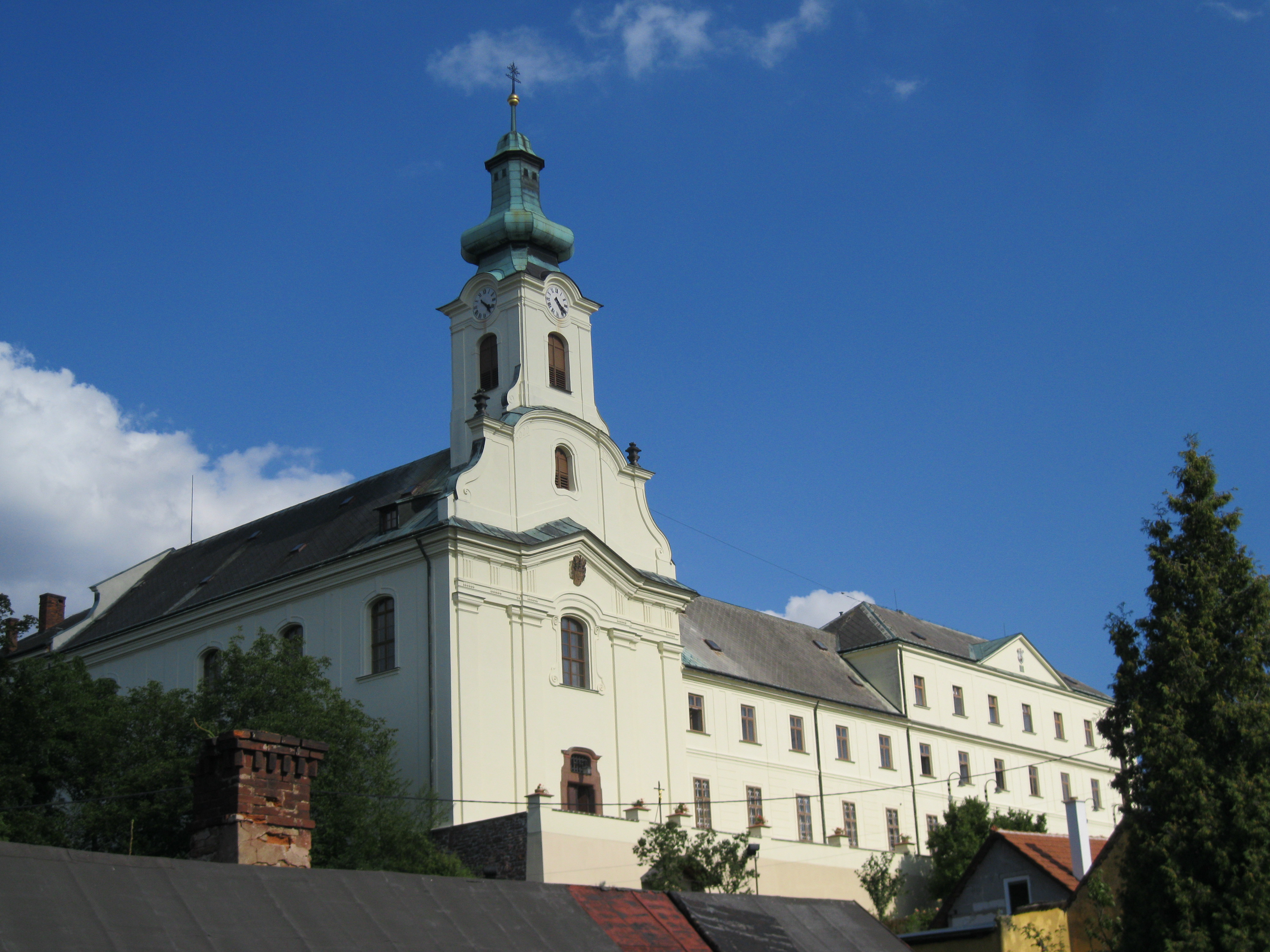
Former monastery

Among the main landmarks of the town is the Letovice Castle. The original castle from the 13th century was rebuilt into an early Baroque residence at the end of the 17th century. Today the castle is privately owned and gradually repaired with the aim of making it available to the public.

The Church of Saint Procopius was built in the Gothic style in the last quarter of the 14th century. It is an important historical and architectural monument. A covered staircase connects the church with the town centre.

The former monastery of the Merciful Brothers was founded in 1747. The monastery complex with the Church of Saint George and a hospital was built in the Baroque style in 1751–1784. Part of the monastery is a unique restored Baroque pharmacy from 1784, open to the public. Today, the entire premises of the former monastery belong to the Letovice Hospital.

== Notable people ==
- Count Gustav Kálnoky (1832–1898), Austro-Hungarian diplomat and statesman
- Alois Biach (1849–1918), Austrian medical doctor and writer
- Emanuel Löffler (1901–1986), gymnast

== Twin towns – sister cities ==
Letovice is twinned with:

- Chełmno, Poland
- Kirchlinteln, Germany
- Kőbánya (Budapest), Hungary
- Slepčany, Slovakia
- Stari Grad, Croatia
