= Lhota (disambiguation) =

Lhota is the most common name of villages in the Czech Republic. It may refer to:

== Places in the Czech Republic ==
=== Municipalities ===
- Lhota (Kladno District) in the Central Bohemian Region
- Lhota (Prague-East District) in the Central Bohemian Region
- Lhota (Přerov District) in the Olomouc Region
- Lhota (Zlín District) in the Zlín Region
- Balkova Lhota in the South Bohemian Region
- Bílá Lhota in the Olomouc Region
- Bradlecká Lhota in the Liberec Region
- Červená Lhota in the Vysočina Region
- Chodská Lhota in the Plzeň Region
- Dlouhá Lhota (Blansko District) in the South Moravian Region
- Dlouhá Lhota (Mladá Boleslav District) in the Central Bohemian Region
- Dlouhá Lhota (Příbram District) in the Central Bohemian Region
- Dlouhá Lhota (Tábor District) in the South Bohemian Region
- Francova Lhota in the Zlín Region
- Haškovcova Lhota in the South Bohemian Region
- Horní Lhota (Ostrava-City District) in the Moravian-Silesian Region
- Horní Lhota (Zlín District) in the Zlín Region
- Hroznová Lhota in the South Moravian Region
- Hurtova Lhota in the Vysočina Region
- Husí Lhota in the Central Bohemian Region
- Jestřabí Lhota in the Central Bohemian Region
- Kacákova Lhota in the Hradec Králové Region
- Kamenná Lhota in the Vysočina Region
- Klášterská Lhota in the Hradec Králové Region
- Králova Lhota (Písek District) in the South Bohemian Region
- Králova Lhota (Rychnov nad Kněžnou District) in the Hradec Králové Region
- Lhota pod Hořičkami in the Hradec Králové Region
- Lhota pod Libčany in the Hradec Králové Region
- Lhota pod Radčem in the Plzeň Region
- Lhota Rapotina in the South Moravian Region
- Lhota u Lysic in the South Moravian Region
- Lhota u Olešnice in the South Moravian Region
- Lhota u Příbramě in the Central Bohemian Region
- Lhota u Vsetína in the Zlín Region
- Lhota-Vlasenice in the Vysočina Region
- Malá Lhota in the South Moravian Region
- Nedašova Lhota in the Zlín Region
- Nová Lhota in the South Moravian Region
- Ostrožská Lhota in the Zlín Region
- Ovesná Lhota in the Vysočina Region
- Písková Lhota (Mladá Boleslav District) in the Central Bohemian Region
- Písková Lhota (Nymburk District) in the Central Bohemian Region
- Podhradní Lhota in the Zlín Region
- Podkopná Lhota in the Zlín Region
- Prosenická Lhota in the Central Bohemian Region
- Rabštejnská Lhota in the Pardubice Region
- Radkova Lhota in the Olomouc Region
- Salačova Lhota in the Vysočina Region
- Šárovcova Lhota in the Hradec Králové Region
- Smetanova Lhota in the South Bohemian Region
- Suchá Lhota in the Pardubice Region
- Tvarožná Lhota in the South Moravian Region
- Uhlířská Lhota in the Central Bohemian Region
- Úhřetická Lhota in the Pardubice Region
- Velká Lhota in the Zlín Region
- Vlachova Lhota in the Zlín Region
- Vranová Lhota in the Pardubice Region
- Vrbová Lhota in the Central Bohemian Region
- Vysoká Lhota in the Vysočina Region
- Zábeštní Lhota in the Olomouc Region
- Zářecká Lhota in the Pardubice Region
- Zelenecká Lhota in the Hradec Králové Region

=== Administrative parts of municipalities ===
- Lhota, a part of Bor (Tachov District) in the Plzeň Region
- Lhota, a part of Černošín in the Plzeň Region
- Lhota, a part of Chříč in the Plzeň Region
- Lhota, a part of Chuchelna in the Liberec Region
- Lhota, a part of Číměř (Jindřichův Hradec District) in the South Bohemian Region
- Lhota, a part of Čistá (Rakovník District) in the Central Bohemian Region
- Lhota, a part of Dolní Břežany in the Central Bohemian Region
- Lhota, a part of Dubá in the Liberec Region
- Lhota, a part of Dynín in the South Bohemian Region
- Lhota, a part of Háj ve Slezsku in the Moravian-Silesian Region
- Lhota, a part of Kelč in the Zlín Region
- Lhota, a part of Letovice in the South Moravian Region
- Lhota, a part of Lhota-Vlasenice in the Vysočina Region
- Lhota, a part of Liběšice (Louny District) in the Ústí nad Labem Region
- Lhota, a part of Lísek in the Vysočina Region
- Lhota, a part of Merklín (Plzeň-South District) in the Plzeň Region
- Lhota, a part of Mladošovice in the South Bohemian Region
- Lhota, a part of Nahořany in the Hradec Králové Region
- Lhota, a part of Netvořice in the Central Bohemian Region
- Lhota, a part of Pačlavice in the Zlín Region
- Lhota, a part of Plzeň in the Plzeň Region
- Lhota, a part of Přelouč in the Pardubice Region
- Lhota, a part of Třebenice (Litoměřice District) in the Ústí nad Labem Region
- Lhota, a part of Trutnov in the Hradec Králové Region
- Lhota, a part of Úštěk in the Ústí nad Labem Region
- Lhota, a part of Valašské Meziříčí in the Zlín Region
- Lhota, a part of Vyškov in the South Moravian Region

=== Castle ===
- Červená Lhota Castle in the South Bohemian Region

== People ==
- Antonín Lhota, Czech painter
- George Lhota, American slalom canoeist
- Joe Lhota, American public servant and politician

== Buildings ==
- William J. Lhota Building, a historic office building in Columbus, Ohio, United States

== See also ==
- Lhotka (disambiguation)
