= Haškovcova Lhota =

- Municipality
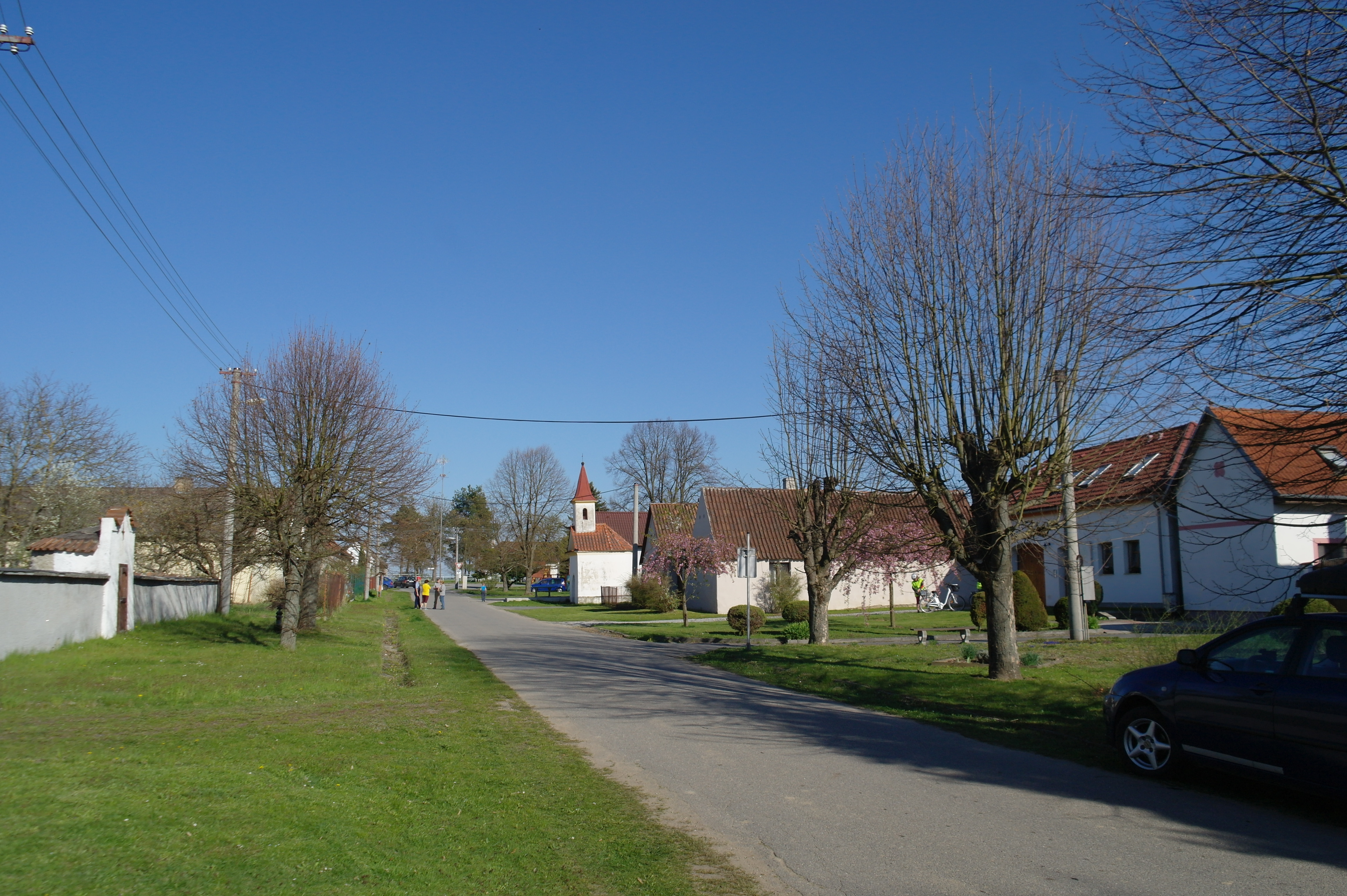
- Centre of Haškovcova Lhota

- Location in the Czech Republic
- Coordinates: 49°19′57″N 14°28′0″E
- Country: Czech Republic
- Region: South Bohemian
- District: Tábor
- First mentioned: 1511

Area
  - Total: 3.04 km^{2} (1.17 sq mi)
- Elevation: 417 m (1,368 ft)

Population (2026-01-01)
  - Total: 74
  - Density: 24/km^{2} (63/sq mi)
- Time zone: UTC+1 (CET)
  - Summer (DST): UTC+2 (CEST)
- Postal code: 391 65
- Website: www.haskovcovalhota.cz

Haškovcova Lhota is a municipality and village in Tábor District in the South Bohemian Region of the Czech Republic. It has about 70 inhabitants.

Haškovcova Lhota lies approximately 17 kilometres (11 mi) south-west of Tábor, 40 km (25 mi) north of České Budějovice, and 85 km (53 mi) south of Prague.

== Demographics ==
Historical population
Year	Pop.	±%
1869	190	—
1880	199	+4.7%
1890	193	−3.0%
1900	201	+4.1%
1910	188	−6.5%
1921	209	+11.2%
1930	207	−1.0%
1950	147	−29.0%
1961	142	−3.4%
1970	101	−28.9%
1980	74	−26.7%
1991	88	+18.9%
2001	83	−5.7%
2011	60	−27.7%
2021	65	+8.3%
Source: Censuses
