= Zábeštní Lhota =

- Municipality
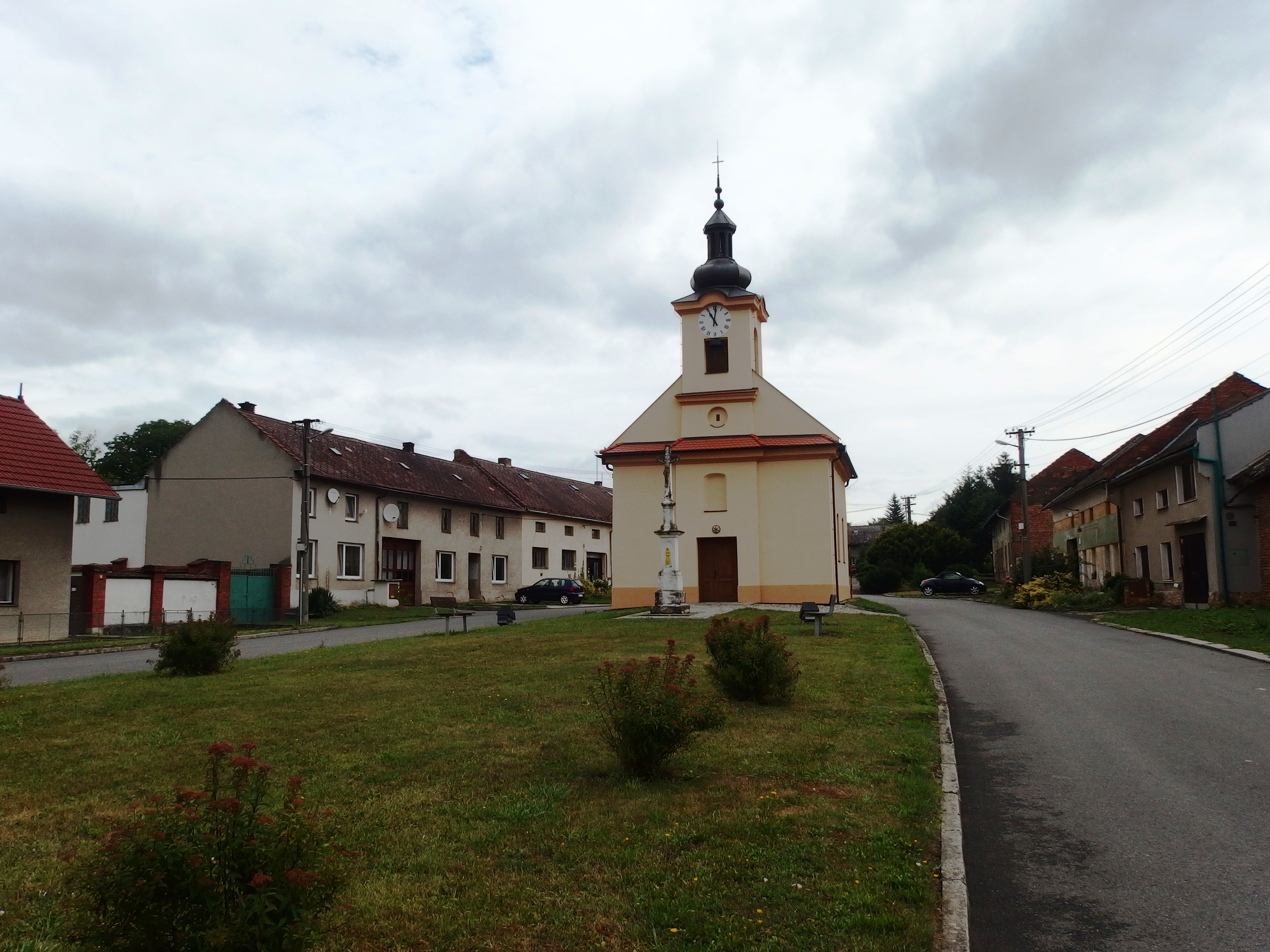
- Centre of Zábeštní Lhota with the Chapel of the Assumption of the Virgin Mary

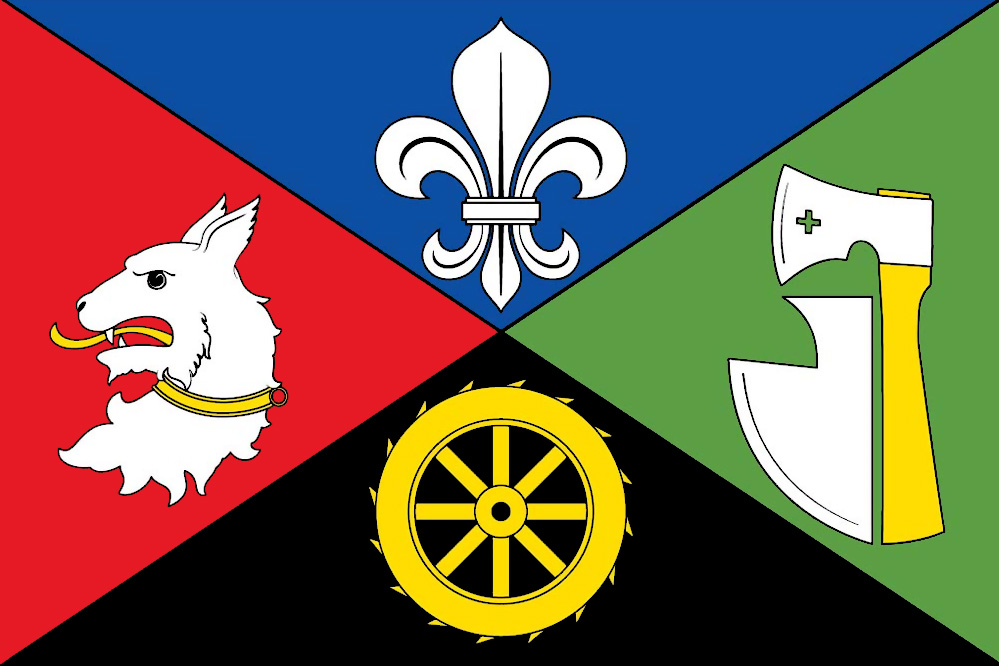
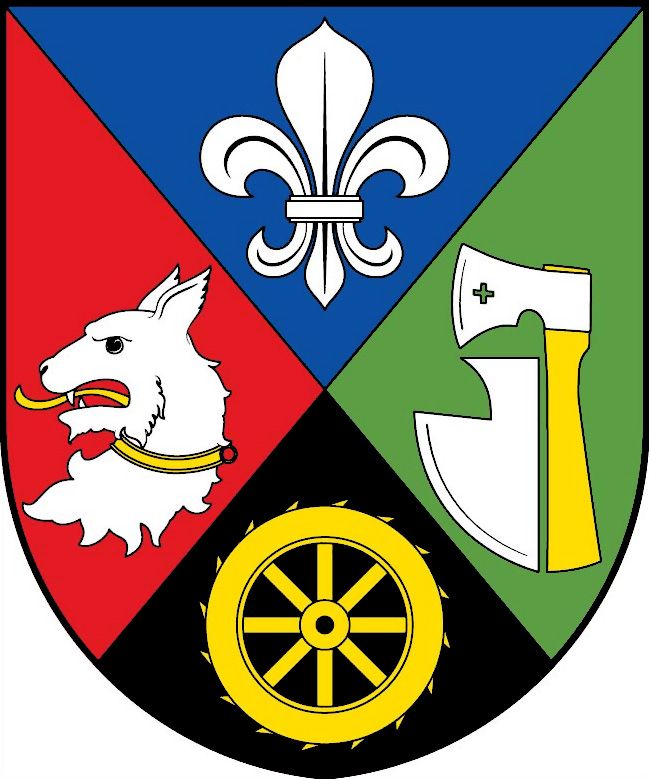
- Flag Coat of arms

- Location in the Czech Republic
- Coordinates: 49°30′43″N 17°25′52″E
- Country: Czech Republic
- Region: Olomouc
- District: Přerov
- First mentioned: 1437

Area
  - Total: 1.47 km^{2} (0.57 sq mi)
- Elevation: 293 m (961 ft)

Population (2026-01-01)
  - Total: 175
  - Density: 119/km^{2} (308/sq mi)
- Time zone: UTC+1 (CET)
  - Summer (DST): UTC+2 (CEST)
- Postal code: 751 27
- Website: www.zabestnilhota.cz

Zábeštní Lhota is a municipality and village in Přerov District in the Olomouc Region of the Czech Republic. It has about 200 inhabitants.

Zábeštní Lhota lies approximately 7 kilometres (4 mi) north of Přerov, 16 km (10 mi) south-east of Olomouc, and 226 km (140 mi) east of Prague.

== Demographics ==
Historical population
Year	Pop.	±%
1869	269	—
1880	256	−4.8%
1890	245	−4.3%
1900	265	+8.2%
1910	255	−3.8%
1921	256	+0.4%
1930	282	+10.2%
1950	219	−22.3%
1961	240	+9.6%
1970	217	−9.6%
1980	168	−22.6%
1991	129	−23.2%
2001	148	+14.7%
2011	158	+6.8%
2021	170	+7.6%
Source: Censuses
