= Lhota Rapotina =

- Municipality
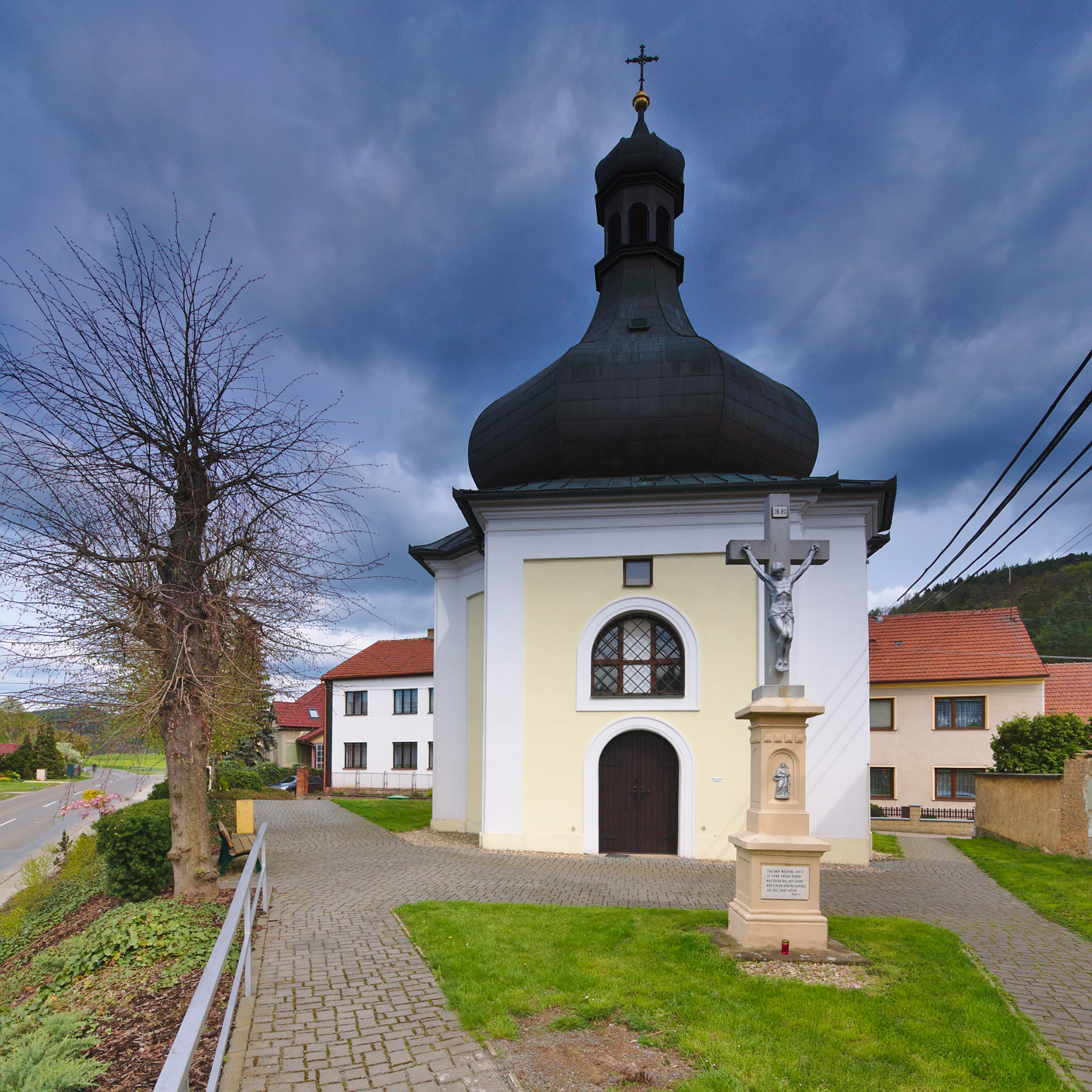
- Church of Saint Lawrence

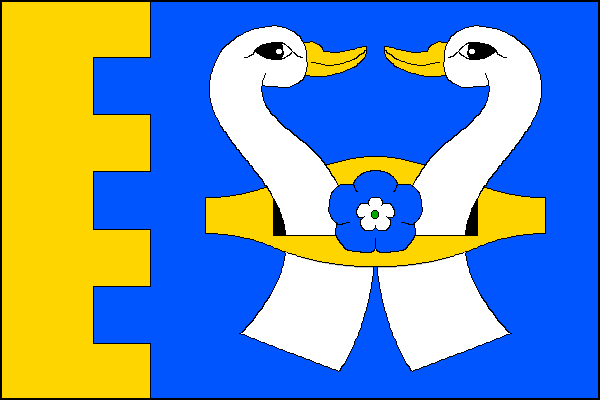
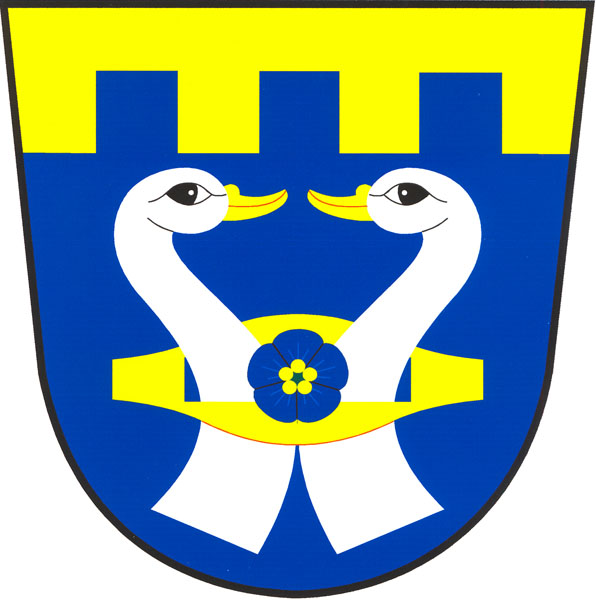
- Flag Coat of arms

- Location in the Czech Republic
- Coordinates: 49°27′58″N 16°37′30″E
- Country: Czech Republic
- Region: South Moravian
- District: Blansko
- First mentioned: 1364

Area
  - Total: 6.17 km^{2} (2.38 sq mi)
- Elevation: 308 m (1,010 ft)

Population (2026-01-01)
  - Total: 437
  - Density: 70.8/km^{2} (183/sq mi)
- Time zone: UTC+1 (CET)
  - Summer (DST): UTC+2 (CEST)
- Postal code: 679 01
- Website: www.lhotarapotina.eu

Lhota Rapotina is a municipality and village in Blansko District in the South Moravian Region of the Czech Republic. It has about 400 inhabitants.

Lhota Rapotina lies approximately 12 kilometres (7 mi) north of Blansko, 30 km (19 mi) north of Brno, and 174 km (108 mi) south-east of Prague.

== Demographics ==
Historical population
| Year | Pop. | ±% |
|---|---|---|
| 1869 | 383 | — |
| 1880 | 406 | +6.0% |
| 1890 | 417 | +2.7% |
| 1900 | 431 | +3.4% |
| 1910 | 520 | +20.6% |
| 1921 | 516 | −0.8% |
| 1930 | 501 | −2.9% |
| 1950 | 482 | −3.8% |
| 1961 | 462 | −4.1% |
| 1970 | 450 | −2.6% |
| 1980 | 400 | −11.1% |
| 1991 | 357 | −10.8% |
| 2001 | 357 | +0.0% |
| 2011 | 392 | +9.8% |
| 2021 | 421 | +7.4% |
Source: Censuses
