= Ovesná Lhota =

- Municipality
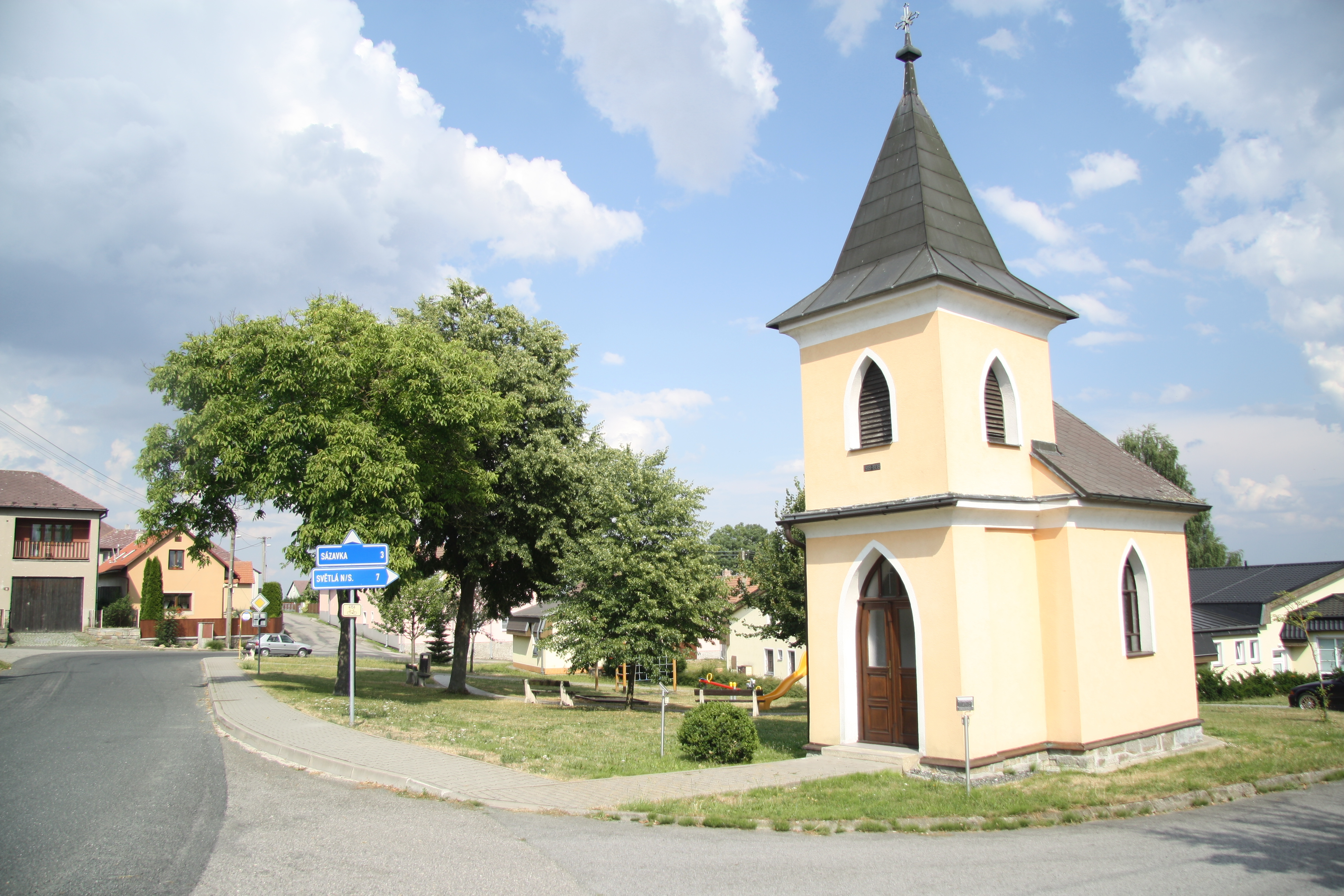
- Centre of Ovesná Lhota

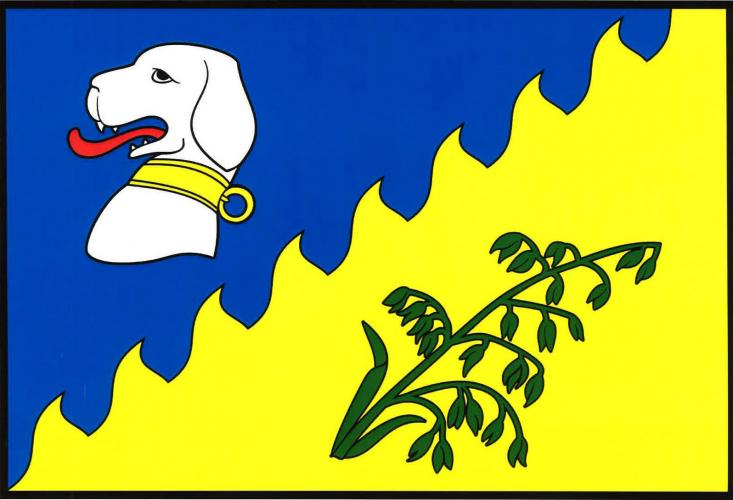
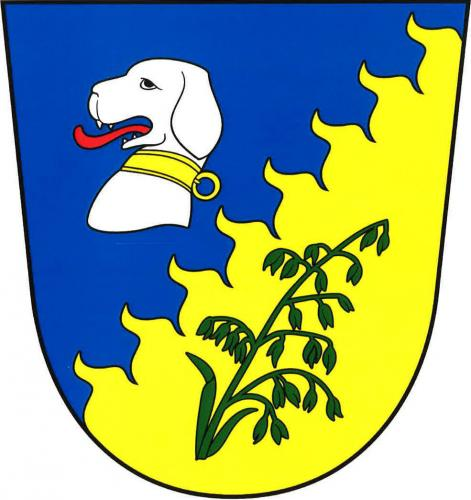
- Flag Coat of arms

- Location in the Czech Republic
- Coordinates: 49°43′21″N 15°23′3″E
- Country: Czech Republic
- Region: Vysočina
- District: Havlíčkův Brod
- First mentioned: 1382

Area
  - Total: 5.60 km^{2} (2.16 sq mi)
- Elevation: 540 m (1,770 ft)

Population (2026-01-01)
  - Total: 178
  - Density: 31.8/km^{2} (82.3/sq mi)
- Time zone: UTC+1 (CET)
  - Summer (DST): UTC+2 (CEST)
- Postal code: 582 91
- Website: www.ovesnalhota.cz

Ovesná Lhota is a municipality and village in Havlíčkův Brod District in the Vysočina Region of the Czech Republic. It has about 200 inhabitants.

Ovesná Lhota lies approximately 20 kilometres (12 mi) north-west of Havlíčkův Brod, 40 km (25 mi) north-west of Jihlava, and 80 km (50 mi) south-east of Prague.

== Demographics ==
Historical population
Year	Pop.	±%
1869	346	—
1880	372	+7.5%
1890	341	−8.3%
1900	331	−2.9%
1910	322	−2.7%
1921	327	+1.6%
1930	320	−2.1%
1950	227	−29.1%
1961	227	+0.0%
1970	221	−2.6%
1980	250	+13.1%
1991	225	−10.0%
2001	212	−5.8%
2011	179	−15.6%
2021	175	−2.2%
Source: Censuses
