= Radkova Lhota =

- Municipality
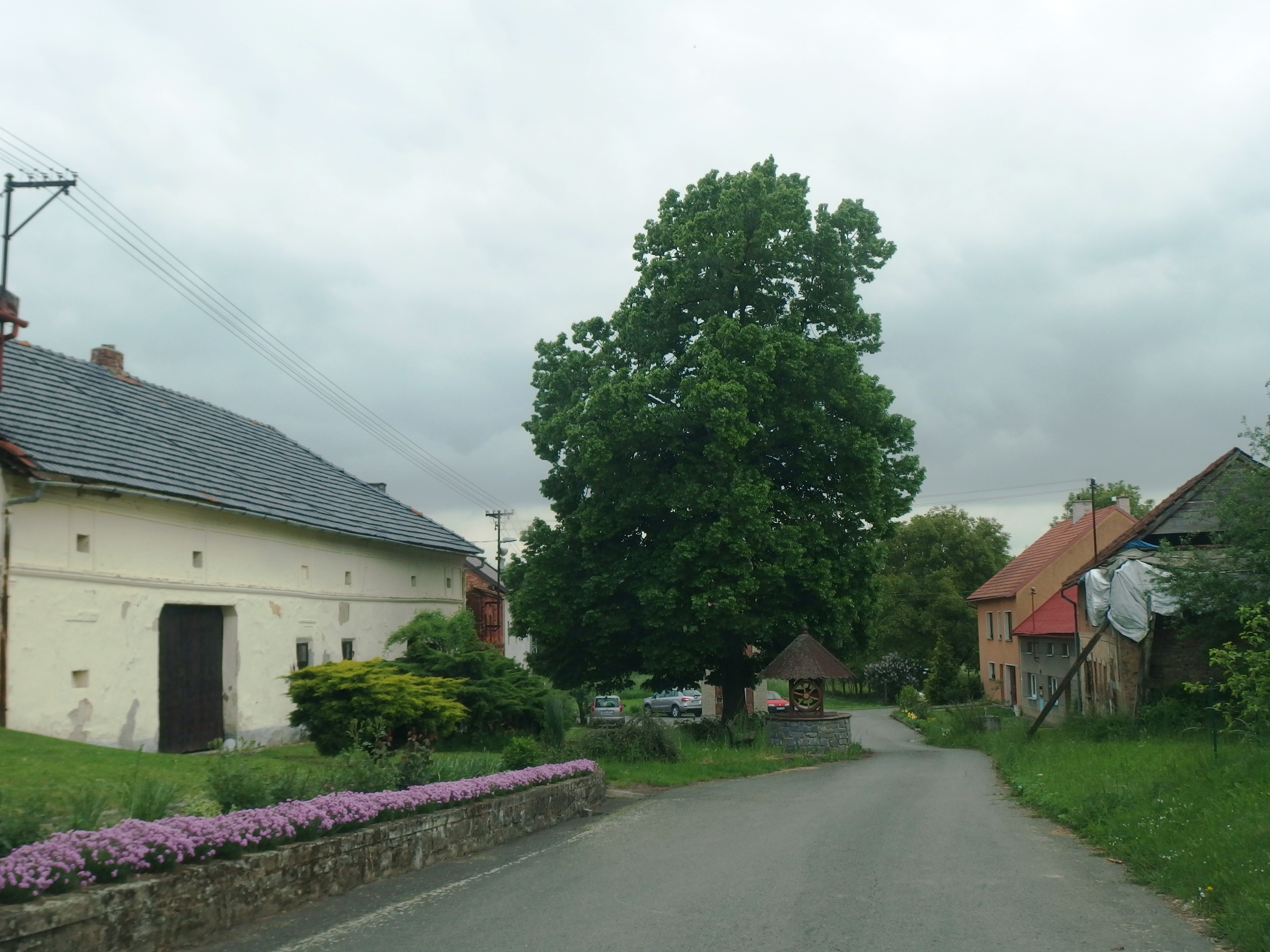
- Centre of Radkova Lhota

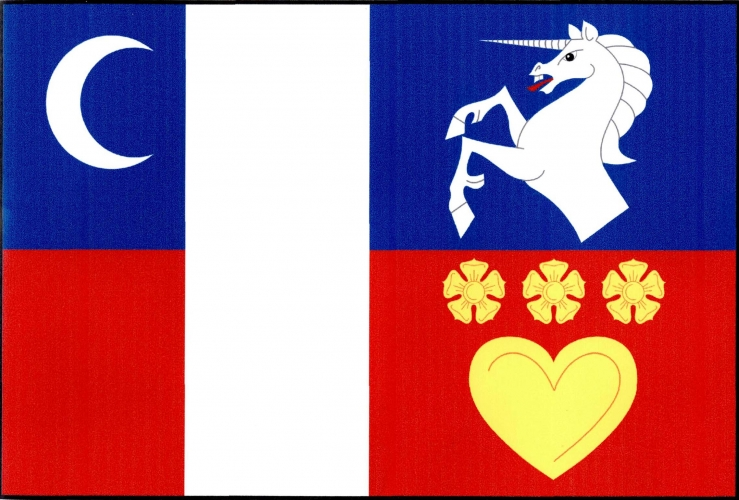
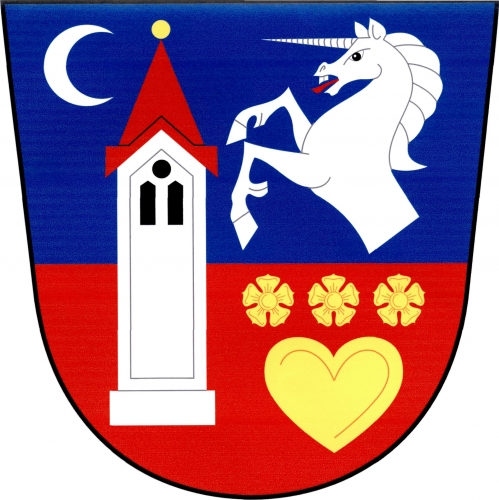
- Flag Coat of arms

- Location in the Czech Republic
- Coordinates: 49°26′30″N 17°37′14″E
- Country: Czech Republic
- Region: Olomouc
- District: Přerov
- First mentioned: 1397

Area
  - Total: 2.10 km^{2} (0.81 sq mi)
- Elevation: 246 m (807 ft)

Population (2026-01-01)
  - Total: 199
  - Density: 94.8/km^{2} (245/sq mi)
- Time zone: UTC+1 (CET)
  - Summer (DST): UTC+2 (CEST)
- Postal code: 751 14
- Website: www.radkovalhota.cz

Radkova Lhota is a municipality and village in Přerov District in the Olomouc Region of the Czech Republic. It has about 200 inhabitants.

Radkova Lhota lies approximately 13 kilometres (8 mi) east of Přerov, 32 km (20 mi) south-east of Olomouc, and 242 km (150 mi) east of Prague.

== Demographics ==
Historical population
Year	Pop.	±%
1869	163	—
1880	152	−6.7%
1890	188	+23.7%
1900	218	+16.0%
1910	212	−2.8%
1921	193	−9.0%
1930	207	+7.3%
1950	126	−39.1%
1961	199	+57.9%
1970	232	+16.6%
1980	221	−4.7%
1991	230	+4.1%
2001	215	−6.5%
2011	225	+4.7%
2021	281	+24.9%
Source: Censuses
