= Červená Lhota =

- Municipality
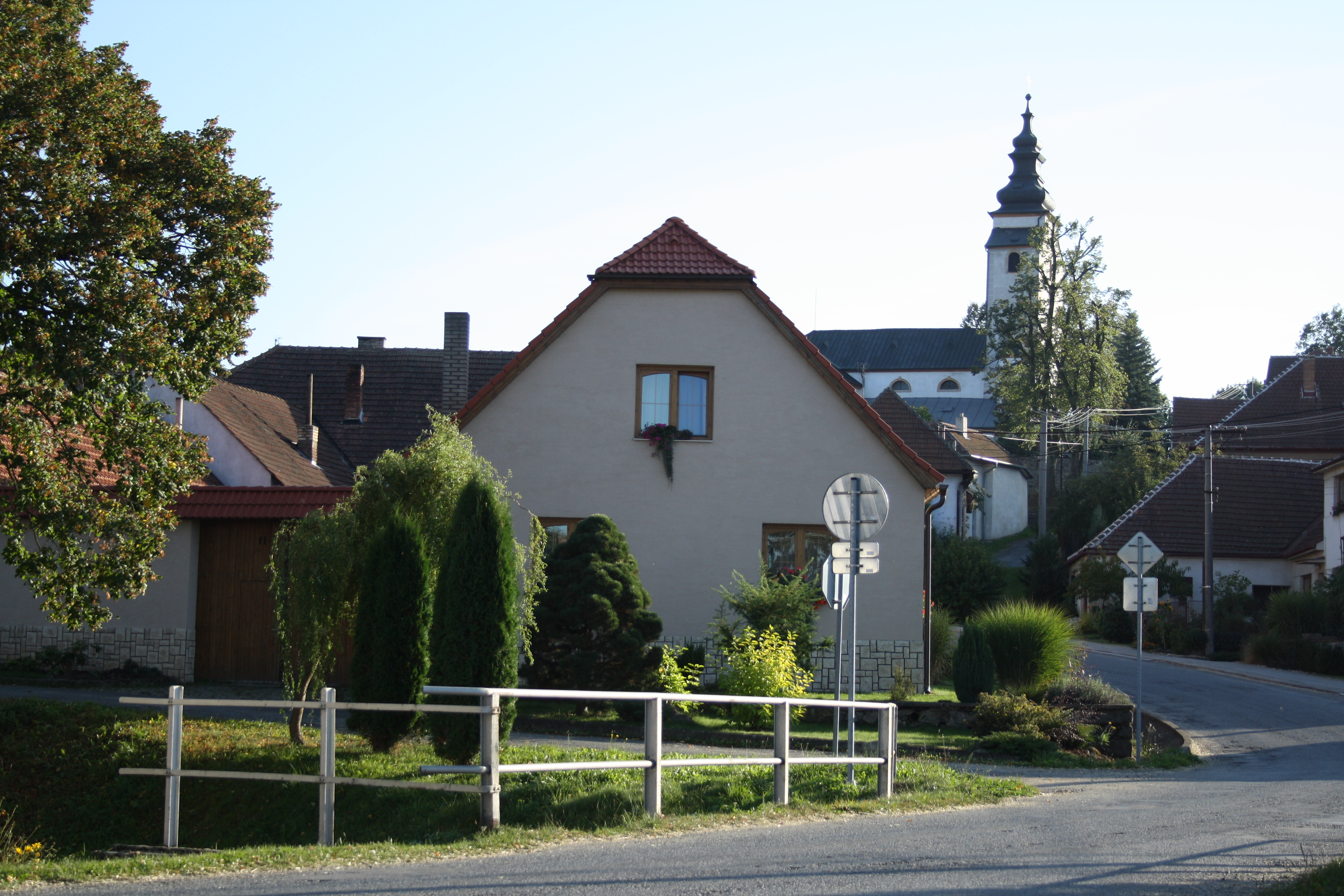
- View towards the Church of Saint Lawrence

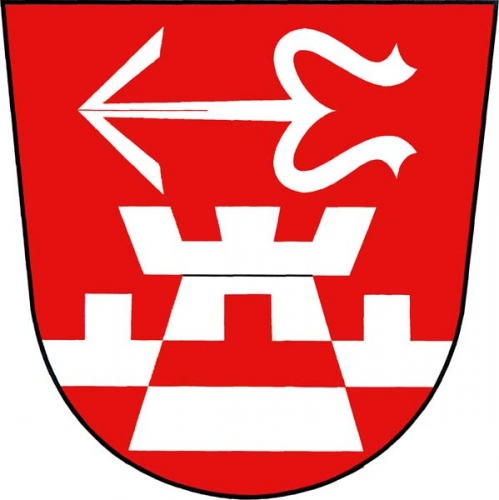
- Flag Coat of arms

- Location in the Czech Republic
- Coordinates: 49°17′4″N 15°48′22″E
- Country: Czech Republic
- Region: Vysočina
- District: Třebíč
- First mentioned: 1400

Area
  - Total: 7.40 km^{2} (2.86 sq mi)
- Elevation: 498 m (1,634 ft)

Population (2026-01-01)
  - Total: 178
  - Density: 24.1/km^{2} (62.3/sq mi)
- Time zone: UTC+1 (CET)
  - Summer (DST): UTC+2 (CEST)
- Postal code: 675 07
- Website: www.obeccervenalhota.cz

Červená Lhota is a municipality and village in Třebíč District in the Vysočina Region of the Czech Republic. It has about 200 inhabitants.

Červená Lhota lies approximately 10 kilometres (6 mi) north-west of Třebíč, 20 km (12 mi) south-east of Jihlava, and 134 km (83 mi) south-east of Prague.

== Demographics ==
Historical population
Year	Pop.	±%
1869	375	—
1880	337	−10.1%
1890	309	−8.3%
1900	343	+11.0%
1910	339	−1.2%
1921	326	−3.8%
1930	323	−0.9%
1950	257	−20.4%
1961	259	+0.8%
1970	232	−10.4%
1980	221	−4.7%
1991	207	−6.3%
2001	188	−9.2%
2011	186	−1.1%
2021	177	−4.8%
Source: Censuses
