= Husí Lhota =

- Municipality
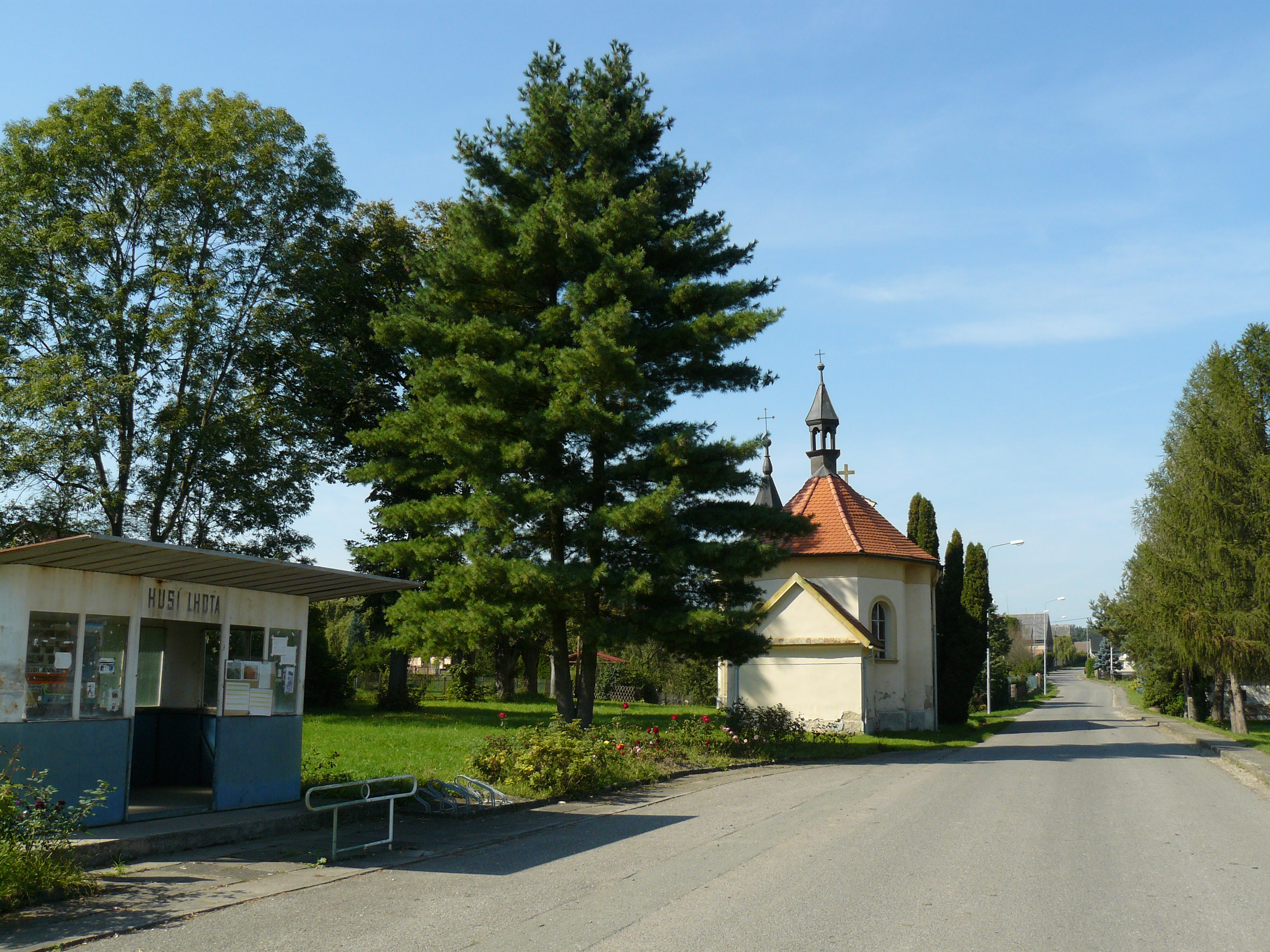
- Centre of Husí Lhota

- Flag Coat of arms

- Location in the Czech Republic
- Coordinates: 50°26′8″N 15°0′17″E
- Country: Czech Republic
- Region: Central Bohemian
- District: Mladá Boleslav
- First mentioned: 1391

Area
  - Total: 3.32 km^{2} (1.28 sq mi)
- Elevation: 229 m (751 ft)

Population (2026-01-01)
  - Total: 162
  - Density: 48.8/km^{2} (126/sq mi)
- Time zone: UTC+1 (CET)
  - Summer (DST): UTC+2 (CEST)
- Postal code: 294 06
- Website: www.husi-lhota.cz

Husí Lhota is a municipality and village in Mladá Boleslav District in the Central Bohemian Region of the Czech Republic. It has about 200 inhabitants.

== Demographics ==
Historical population
Year	Pop.	±%
1869	166	—
1880	181	+9.0%
1890	194	+7.2%
1900	191	−1.5%
1910	189	−1.0%
1921	193	+2.1%
1930	205	+6.2%
1950	129	−37.1%
1961	155	+20.2%
1970	131	−15.5%
1980	125	−4.6%
1991	120	−4.0%
2001	110	−8.3%
2011	151	+37.3%
2021	156	+3.3%
Source: Censuses
