= George Lhota =

American canoeist

Medal record

Men's canoe slalom

Representing United States

World Championships
Silver medal – second place	1975 Skopje	Mixed C-2

George Lhota is a former American slalom canoeist who competed in the mid-1970s. He won a silver medal in the mixed C-2 event at the 1975 ICF Canoe Slalom World Championships in Skopje.
