= Hurtova Lhota =

- Municipality
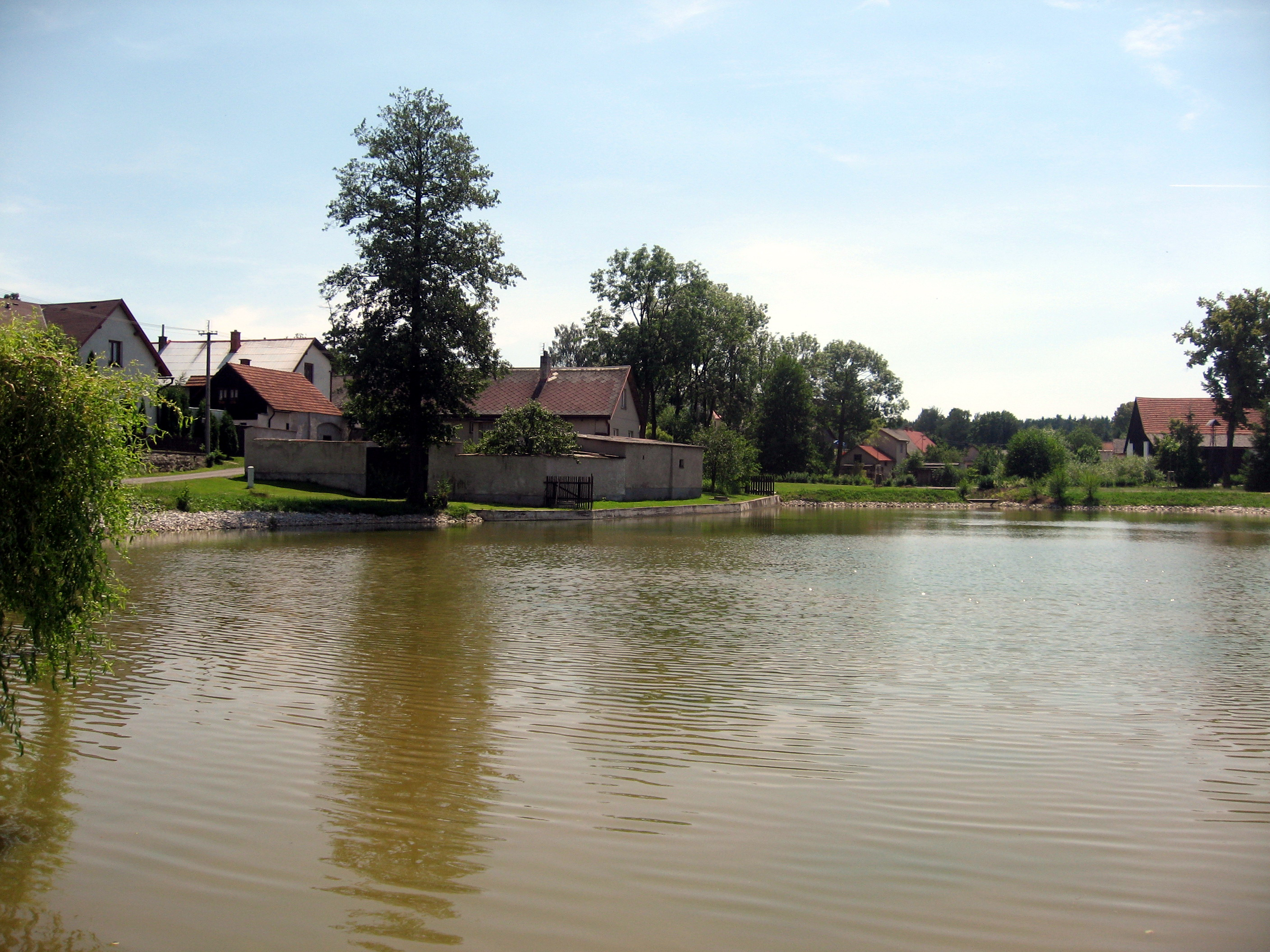
- Pond in the centre of Hurtova Lhota

- Location in the Czech Republic
- Coordinates: 49°35′47″N 15°30′32″E
- Country: Czech Republic
- Region: Vysočina
- District: Havlíčkův Brod
- First mentioned: 1436

Area
  - Total: 2.98 km^{2} (1.15 sq mi)
- Elevation: 455 m (1,493 ft)

Population (2026-01-01)
  - Total: 254
  - Density: 85.2/km^{2} (221/sq mi)
- Time zone: UTC+1 (CET)
  - Summer (DST): UTC+2 (CEST)
- Postal code: 580 01
- Website: www.obechurtovalhota.cz

Hurtova Lhota is a municipality and village in Havlíčkův Brod District in the Vysočina Region of the Czech Republic. It has about 300 inhabitants.

== History ==
The first written mention of Hurtova Lhota is from 1436.

== Demographics ==
Historical population
Year	Pop.	±%
1869	270	—
1880	248	−8.1%
1890	267	+7.7%
1900	273	+2.2%
1910	272	−0.4%
1921	263	−3.3%
1930	259	−1.5%
1950	214	−17.4%
1961	255	+19.2%
1970	234	−8.2%
1980	209	−10.7%
1991	185	−11.5%
2001	223	+20.5%
2011	222	−0.4%
2021	241	+8.6%
Source: Censuses
