= Lhota (Zlín District) =

- Municipality
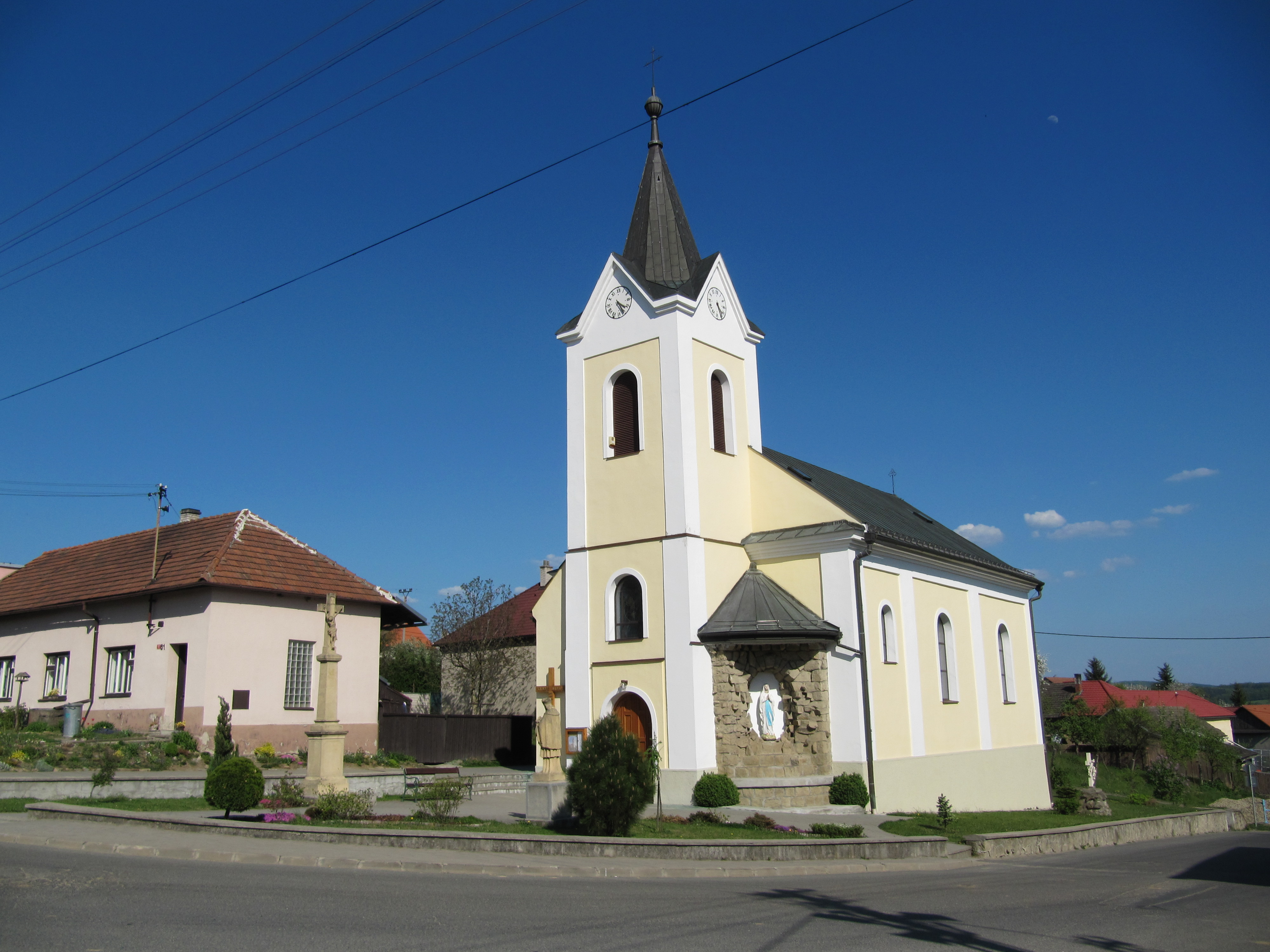
- Church of Saint Anne

- Flag Coat of arms

- Location in the Czech Republic
- Coordinates: 49°10′10″N 17°36′9″E
- Country: Czech Republic
- Region: Zlín
- District: Zlín
- First mentioned: 1362

Area
  - Total: 5.02 km^{2} (1.94 sq mi)
- Elevation: 340 m (1,120 ft)

Population (2026-01-01)
  - Total: 911
  - Density: 181/km^{2} (470/sq mi)
- Time zone: UTC+1 (CET)
  - Summer (DST): UTC+2 (CEST)
- Postal code: 763 02
- Website: www.lhota-zlin.cz

Lhota is a municipality and village in Zlín District in the Zlín Region of the Czech Republic. It has about 900 inhabitants.

Lhota lies approximately 9 kilometres (6 mi) south-west of Zlín and 252 km (157 mi) south-east of Prague.

== Demographics ==
Historical population
Year	Pop.	±%
1869	534	—
1880	610	+14.2%
1890	637	+4.4%
1900	753	+18.2%
1910	788	+4.6%
1921	772	−2.0%
1930	820	+6.2%
1950	858	+4.6%
1961	944	+10.0%
1970	875	−7.3%
1980	734	−16.1%
1991	645	−12.1%
2001	751	+16.4%
2011	800	+6.5%
2021	882	+10.3%
Source: Censuses
