= Vrbová Lhota =

- Municipality
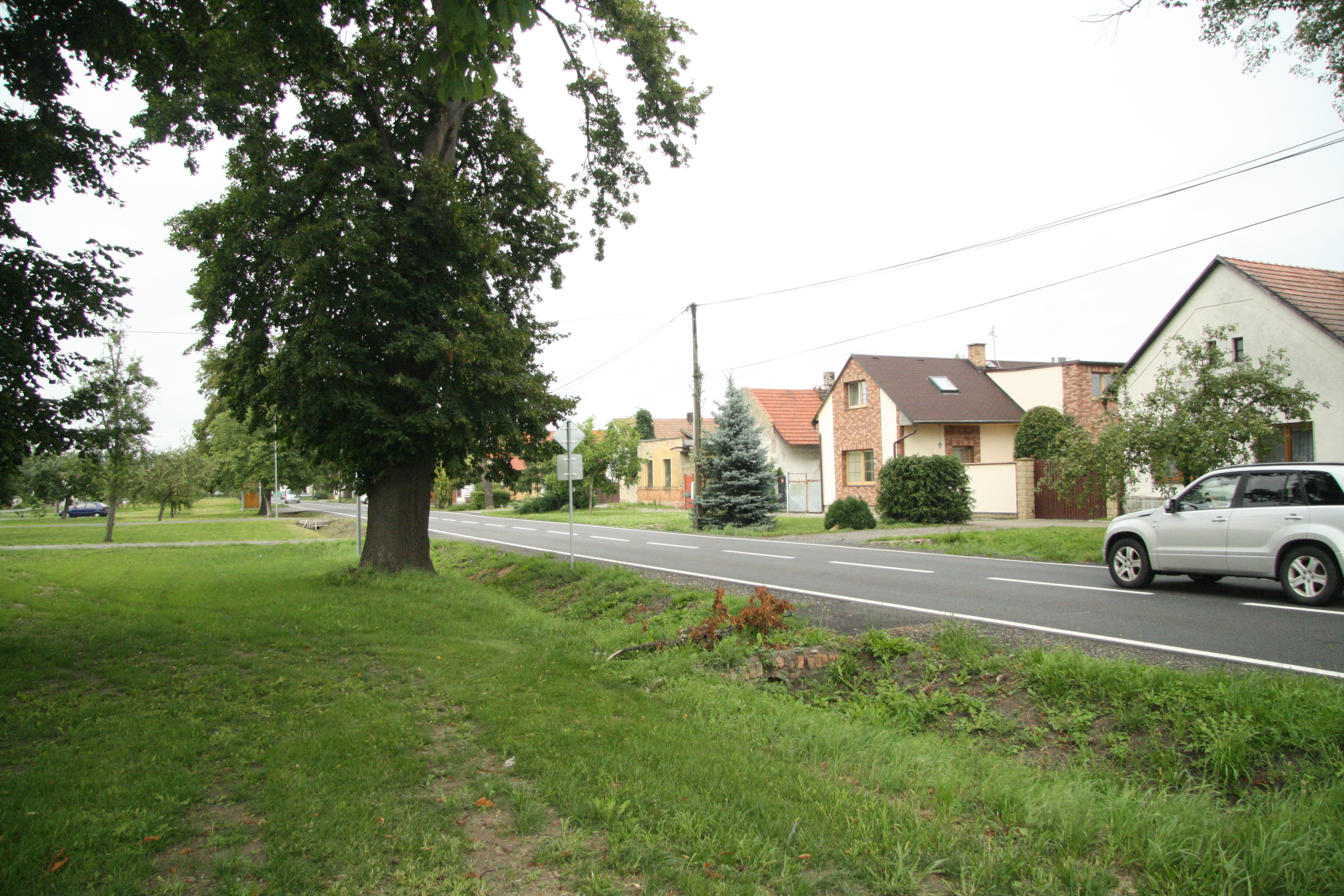
- Centre of Vrbová Lhota

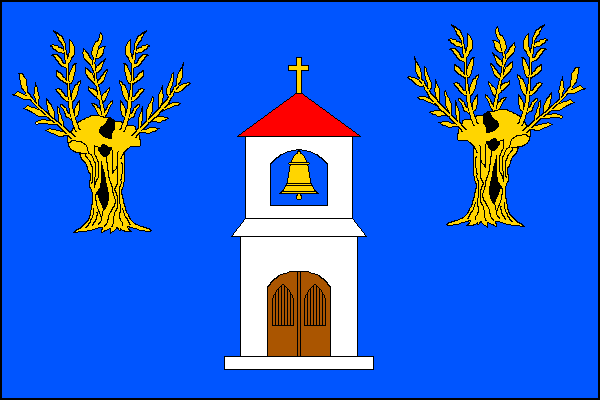
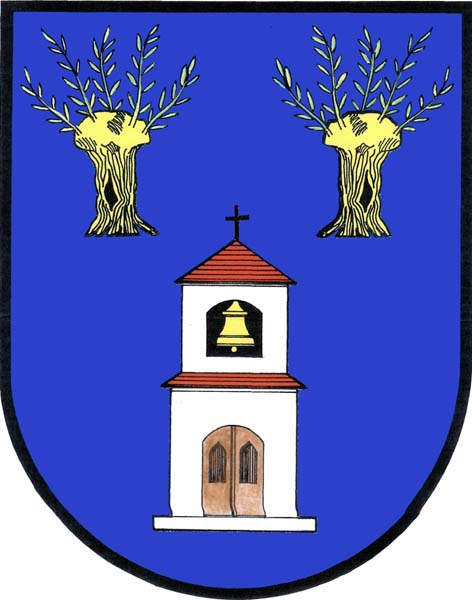
- Flag Coat of arms

- Location in the Czech Republic
- Coordinates: 50°6′43″N 15°3′46″E
- Country: Czech Republic
- Region: Central Bohemian
- District: Nymburk
- First mentioned: 1502

Area
  - Total: 6.04 km^{2} (2.33 sq mi)
- Elevation: 188 m (617 ft)

Population (2026-01-01)
  - Total: 561
  - Density: 92.9/km^{2} (241/sq mi)
- Time zone: UTC+1 (CET)
  - Summer (DST): UTC+2 (CEST)
- Postal code: 289 11
- Website: www.vrbova-lhota.cz

Vrbová Lhota is a municipality and village in Nymburk District in the Central Bohemian Region of the Czech Republic. It has about 600 inhabitants.

== Demographics ==
Historical population
Year	Pop.	±%
1869	341	—
1880	399	+17.0%
1890	392	−1.8%
1900	477	+21.7%
1910	547	+14.7%
1921	528	−3.5%
1930	522	−1.1%
1950	476	−8.8%
1961	442	−7.1%
1970	435	−1.6%
1980	391	−10.1%
1991	353	−9.7%
2001	369	+4.5%
2011	455	+23.3%
2021	543	+19.3%
Source: Censuses
