= Salačova Lhota =

- Municipality
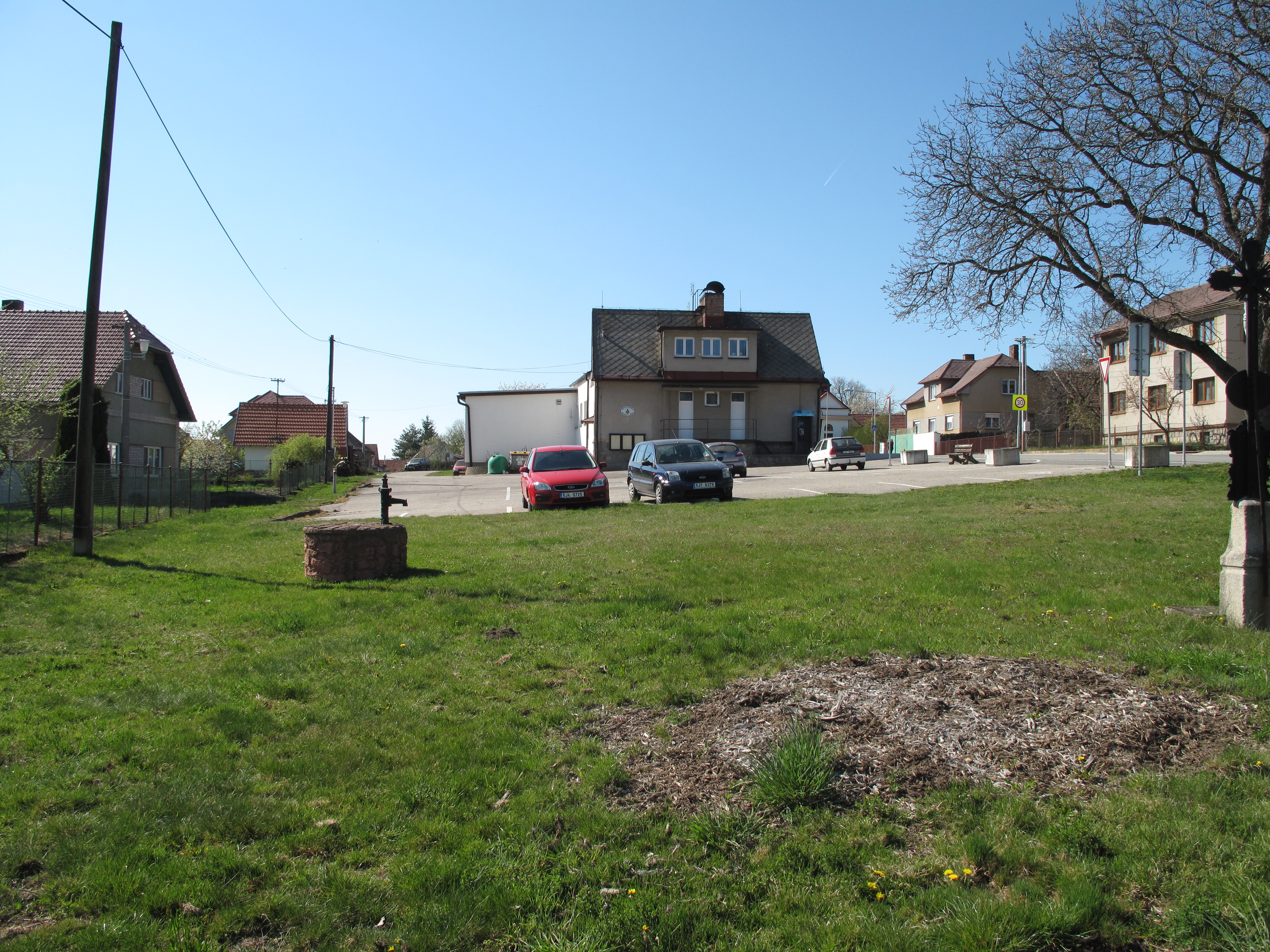
- Centre of Salačova Lhota

- Flag Coat of arms

- Location in the Czech Republic
- Coordinates: 49°31′27″N 14°58′49″E
- Country: Czech Republic
- Region: Vysočina
- District: Pelhřimov
- First mentioned: 1407

Area
  - Total: 5.98 km^{2} (2.31 sq mi)
- Elevation: 573 m (1,880 ft)

Population (2026-01-01)
  - Total: 131
  - Density: 21.9/km^{2} (56.7/sq mi)
- Time zone: UTC+1 (CET)
  - Summer (DST): UTC+2 (CEST)
- Postal code: 395 01
- Website: www.salacovalhota.cz

Salačova Lhota is a municipality and village in Pelhřimov District in the Vysočina Region of the Czech Republic. It has about 100 inhabitants.

Salačova Lhota lies approximately 21 kilometres (13 mi) north-west of Pelhřimov, 47 km (29 mi) west of Jihlava, and 75 km (47 mi) south-east of Prague.

== Administrative division ==
Salačova Lhota consists of three municipal parts (in brackets population according to the 2021 census):

- Salačova Lhota (99)
- Malá Černá (10)
- Velká Černá (18)

== Demographics ==
Historical population
Year	Pop.	±%
1869	387	—
1880	414	+7.0%
1890	370	−10.6%
1900	341	−7.8%
1910	351	+2.9%
1921	339	−3.4%
1930	256	−24.5%
1950	226	−11.7%
1961	236	+4.4%
1970	201	−14.8%
1980	194	−3.5%
1991	146	−24.7%
2001	140	−4.1%
2011	132	−5.7%
2021	127	−3.8%
Source: Censuses
