= Lhota pod Libčany =

- Municipality
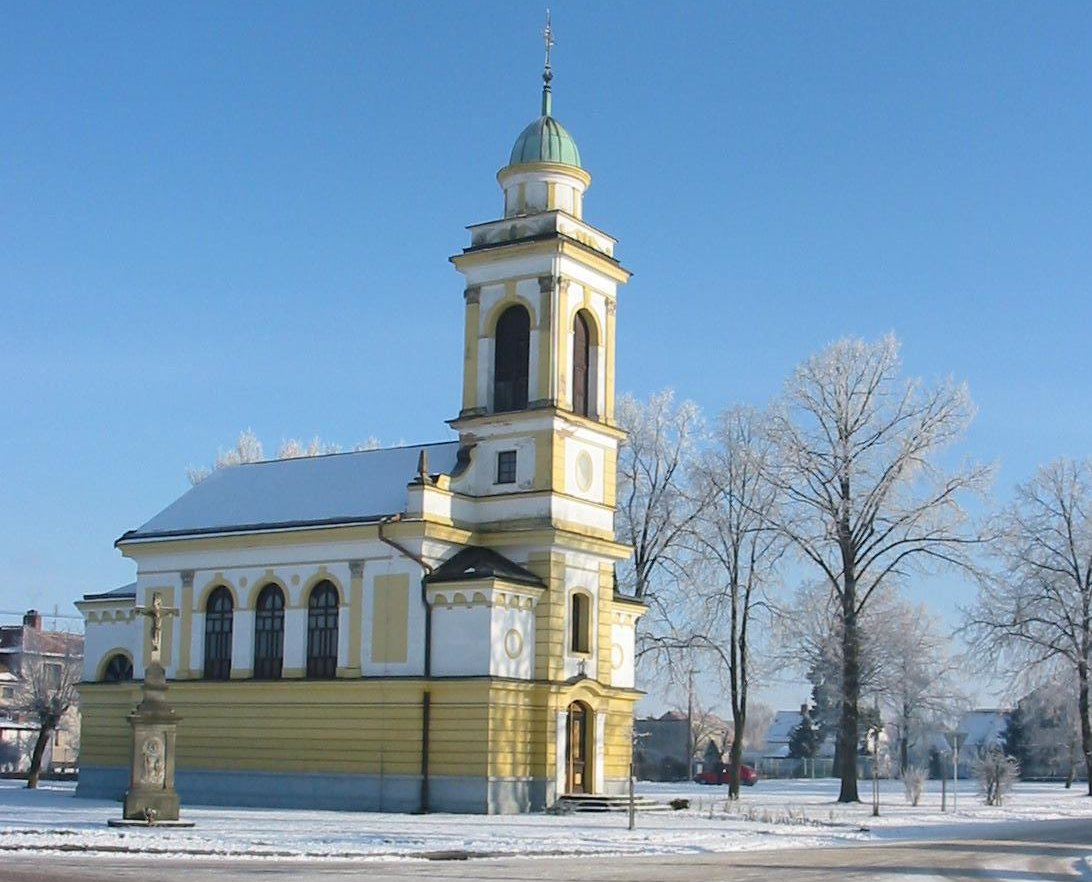
- Chapel of the Holy Trinity

- Flag Coat of arms

- Location in the Czech Republic
- Coordinates: 50°10′21″N 15°41′47″E
- Country: Czech Republic
- Region: Hradec Králové
- District: Hradec Králové
- First mentioned: 1436

Area
  - Total: 8.38 km^{2} (3.24 sq mi)
- Elevation: 239 m (784 ft)

Population (2026-01-01)
  - Total: 1,026
  - Density: 122/km^{2} (317/sq mi)
- Time zone: UTC+1 (CET)
  - Summer (DST): UTC+2 (CEST)
- Postal code: 503 27
- Website: www.lhotapodlibcany.cz

Lhota pod Libčany is a municipality and village in Hradec Králové District in the Hradec Králové Region of the Czech Republic. It has about 1,000 inhabitants.

== Administrative division ==
Lhota pod Libčany consists of two municipal parts (in brackets population according to the 2021 census):

- Lhota pod Libčany (872)
- Hubenice (92)

== Geography ==
Lhota pod Libčany is located about 9 kilometres (6 mi) southwest of Hradec Králové. It lies in a flat agricultural landscape in the East Elbe Table.

== Demographics ==
Historical population
Year	Pop.	±%
1869	749	—
1880	772	+3.1%
1890	846	+9.6%
1900	795	−6.0%
1910	798	+0.4%
1921	791	−0.9%
1930	839	+6.1%
1950	687	−18.1%
1961	722	+5.1%
1970	691	−4.3%
1980	733	+6.1%
1991	744	+1.5%
2001	785	+5.5%
2011	928	+18.2%
2021	964	+3.9%
Source: Censuses
