= Zelenecká Lhota =

- Municipality
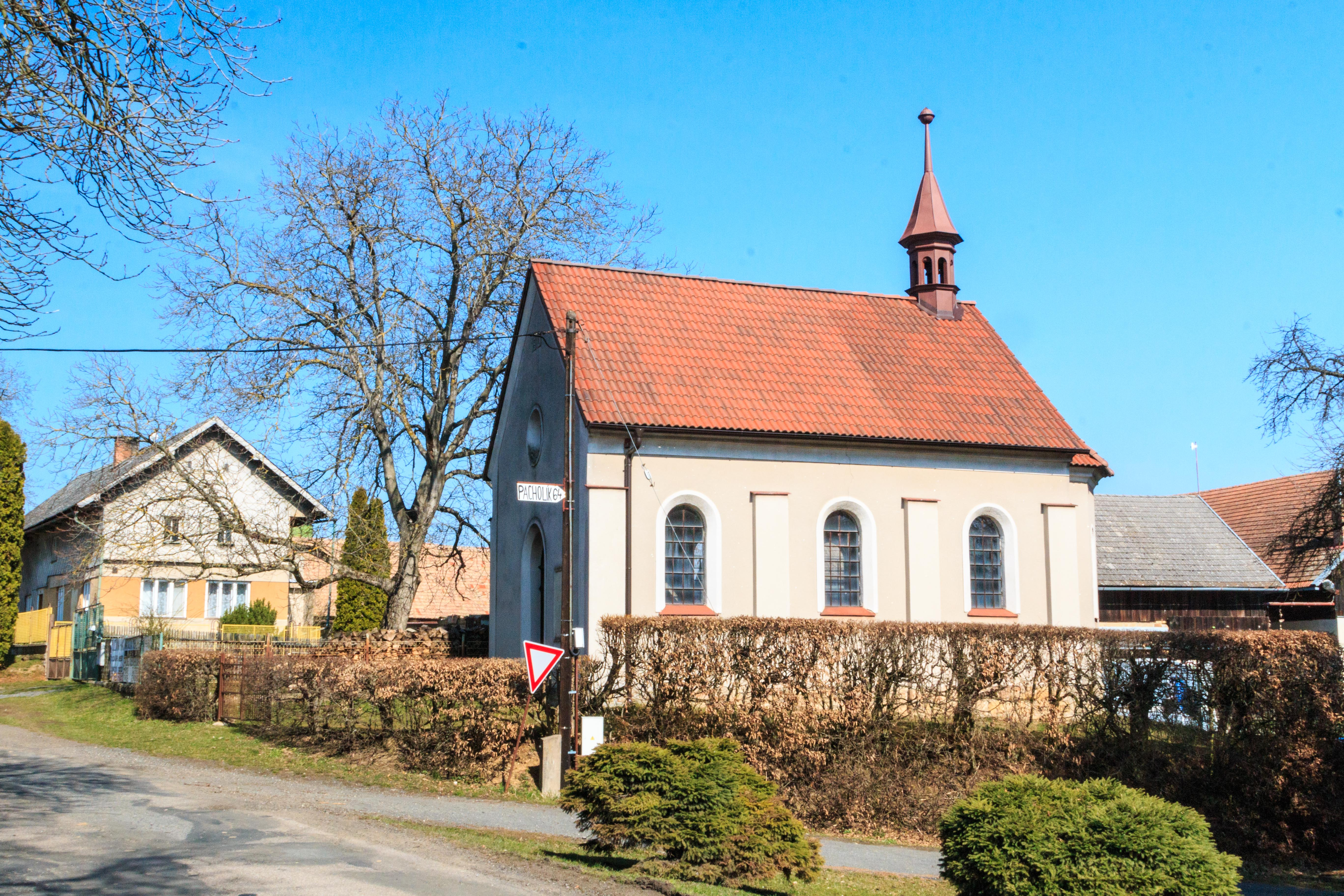
- Chapel of the Holy Trinity

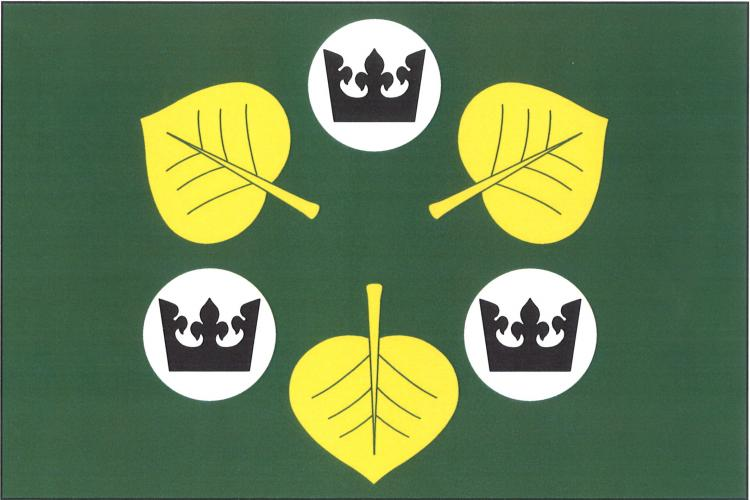
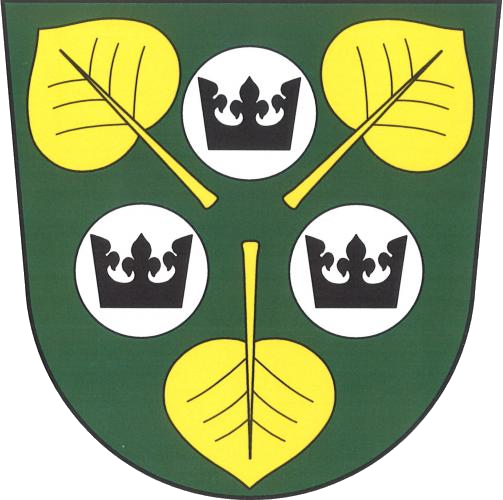
- Flag Coat of arms

- Location in the Czech Republic
- Coordinates: 50°24′6″N 15°10′44″E
- Country: Czech Republic
- Region: Hradec Králové
- District: Jičín
- First mentioned: 1532

Area
  - Total: 6.66 km^{2} (2.57 sq mi)
- Elevation: 332 m (1,089 ft)

Population (2026-01-01)
  - Total: 178
  - Density: 26.7/km^{2} (69.2/sq mi)
- Time zone: UTC+1 (CET)
  - Summer (DST): UTC+2 (CEST)
- Postal code: 507 23
- Website: www.zeleneckalhota.cz

Zelenecká Lhota is a municipality and village in Jičín District in the Hradec Králové Region of the Czech Republic. It has about 200 inhabitants.

== Administrative division ==
Zelenecká Lhota consists of two municipal parts (in brackets population according to the 2021 census):

- Zelenecká Lhota (114)
- Záhuby (48)

== History ==
The first written mention of Zelenecká Lhota is from 1532.

== Demographics ==
Historical population
Year	Pop.	±%
1869	469	—
1880	462	−1.5%
1890	458	−0.9%
1900	466	+1.7%
1910	474	+1.7%
1921	454	−4.2%
1930	410	−9.7%
1950	333	−18.8%
1961	278	−16.5%
1970	239	−14.0%
1980	215	−10.0%
1991	171	−20.5%
2001	161	−5.8%
2011	151	−6.2%
2021	162	+7.3%
Source: Censuses
