= Šárovcova Lhota =

- Municipality
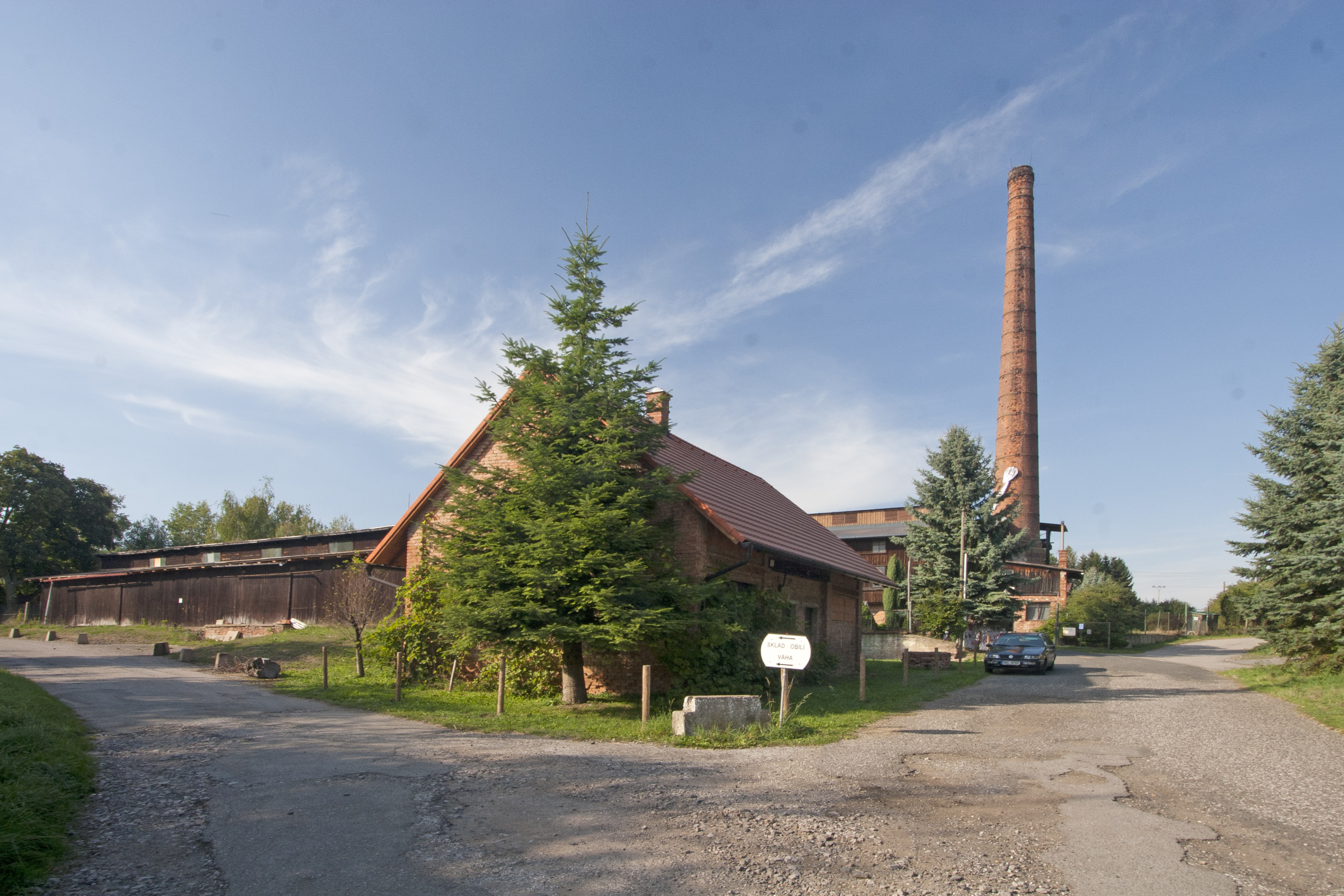
- Former brickworks

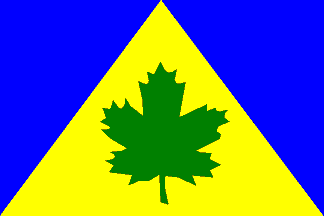
- Flag Coat of arms

- Location in the Czech Republic
- Coordinates: 50°24′27″N 15°33′45″E
- Country: Czech Republic
- Region: Hradec Králové
- District: Jičín
- First mentioned: 1518

Area
  - Total: 7.09 km^{2} (2.74 sq mi)
- Elevation: 292 m (958 ft)

Population (2026-01-01)
  - Total: 219
  - Density: 30.9/km^{2} (80.0/sq mi)
- Time zone: UTC+1 (CET)
  - Summer (DST): UTC+2 (CEST)
- Postal code: 507 59
- Website: www.sarovcova-lhota.cz

Šárovcova Lhota is a municipality and village in Jičín District in the Hradec Králové Region of the Czech Republic. It has about 200 inhabitants.

== Administrative division ==
Šárovcova Lhota consists of four municipal parts (in brackets population according to the 2021 census):

- Šárovcova Lhota (149)
- Bertoldka (2)
- Libín (12)
- Tikov (18)

== Demographics ==
Historical population
Year	Pop.	±%
1869	577	—
1880	586	+1.6%
1890	609	+3.9%
1900	539	−11.5%
1910	500	−7.2%
1921	464	−7.2%
1930	493	+6.2%
1950	320	−35.1%
1961	301	−5.9%
1970	296	−1.7%
1980	234	−20.9%
1991	201	−14.1%
2001	203	+1.0%
2011	200	−1.5%
2021	181	−9.5%
Source: Censuses
