= Lhota u Příbramě =

- Municipality
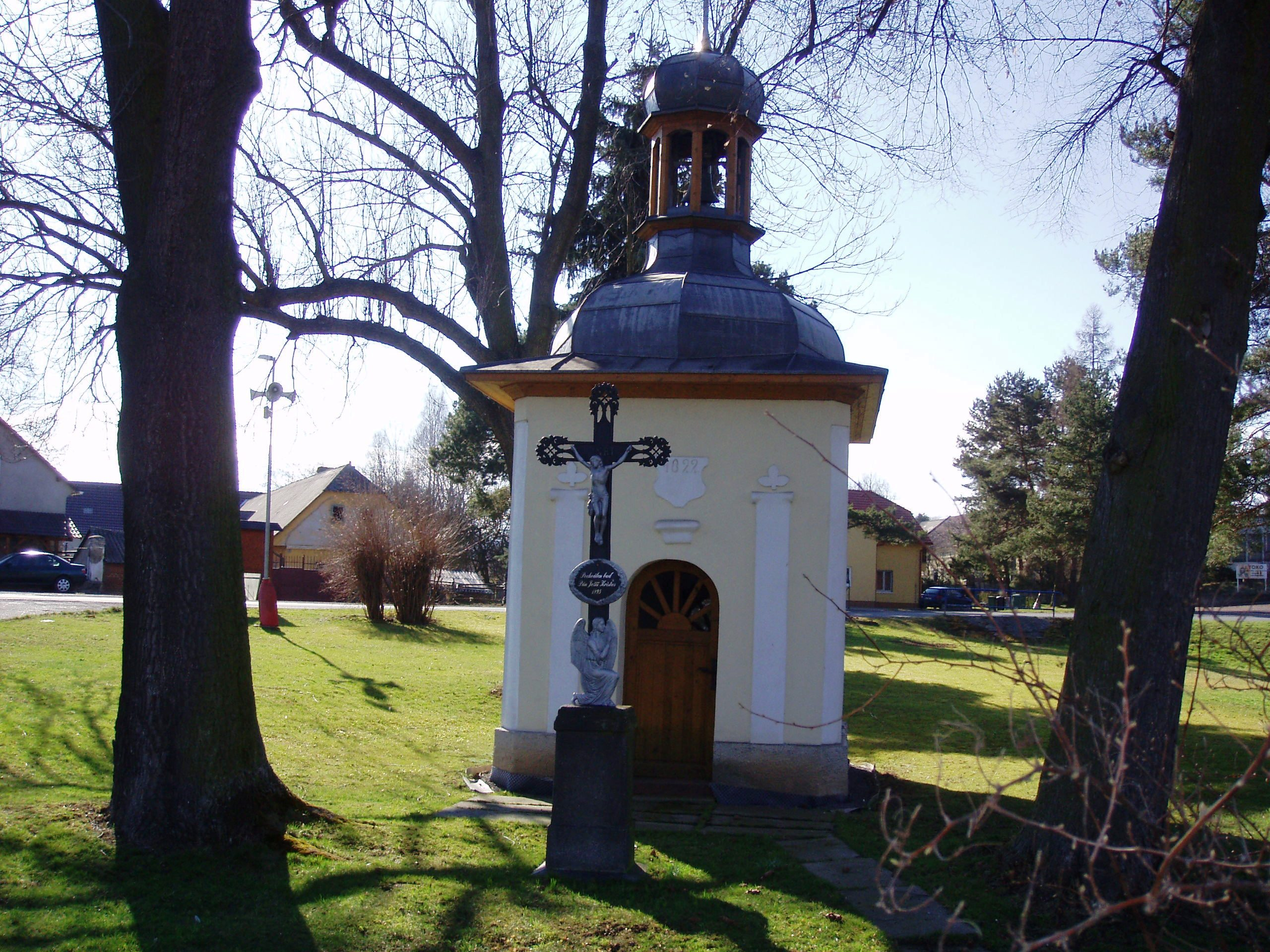
- Chapel in the centre of the village

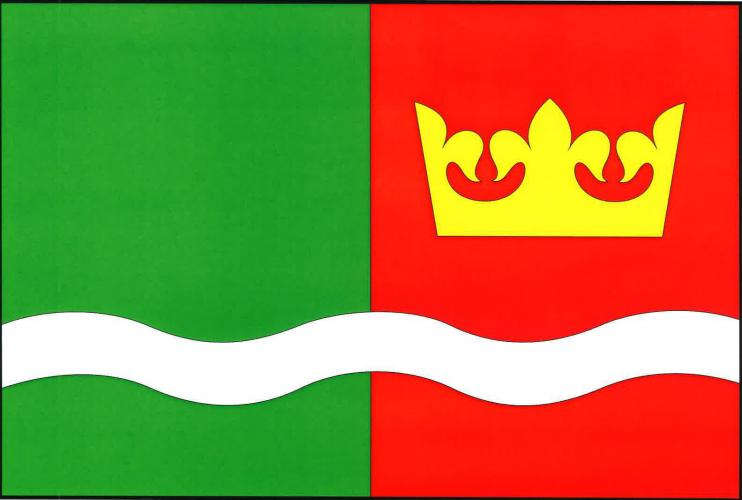
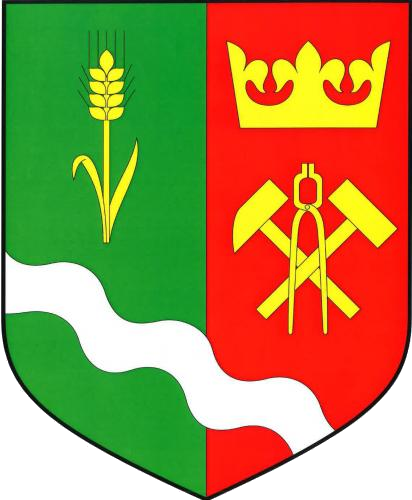
- Flag Coat of arms

- Location in the Czech Republic
- Coordinates: 49°42′51″N 13°58′50″E
- Country: Czech Republic
- Region: Central Bohemian
- District: Příbram
- First mentioned: 1292

Area
  - Total: 3.51 km^{2} (1.36 sq mi)
- Elevation: 487 m (1,598 ft)

Population (2026-01-01)
  - Total: 486
  - Density: 138/km^{2} (359/sq mi)
- Time zone: UTC+1 (CET)
  - Summer (DST): UTC+2 (CEST)
- Postal code: 261 01
- Website: www.lhotaupribrame.cz

Lhota u Příbramě is a municipality and village in Příbram District in the Central Bohemian Region of the Czech Republic. It has about 500 inhabitants.

== Etymology ==
The name Lhota is a common name of Czech villages. The suffix u Příbramě means 'near Příbram'. Until the 20th century, the village was called Německá Lhota ('German Lhota').

== Geography ==
Lhota u Příbramě is located about 4 kilometres (2 mi) north of Příbram and 47 km (29 mi) southwest of Prague. It lies in the Brdy Highlands. The highest point is the hill Hůrka at 535 m (1,755 ft). The stream Obecnický potok flows through the municipality and then merges with the Litavka River just outside the municipality.

== History ==
The first written mention of Německá Lhota is from 1292, when King Wenceslaus II donated the village to the newly established Zbraslav Monastery. After the monastery was burned down during the Hussite Wars (1419–1434), it became a property of the royal chamber again. From 1741 until the establishment of an independent municipality in 1849, Německá Lhota was owned by the town of Příbram.

In 1947, the municipality was renamed from Německá Lhota to its current name.

== Demographics ==
Historical population

Year	Pop.	±%
1869	507	—
1880	590	+16.4%
1890	751	+27.3%
1900	903	+20.2%
1910	806	−10.7%

Year	Pop.	±%
1921	660	−18.1%
1930	625	−5.3%
1950	444	−29.0%
1961	466	+5.0%
1970	426	−8.6%

Year	Pop.	±%
1980	544	+27.7%
1991	479	−11.9%
2001	471	−1.7%
2011	466	−1.1%
2021	496	+6.4%

Source: Censuses

== Transport ==
There are no railways or major roads passing through the municipality.

== Sights ==
There are no protected cultural monuments in the municipality. The main landmark is a chapel in the centre of the village, built in 1822.
