= Lhota-Vlasenice =

- Municipality
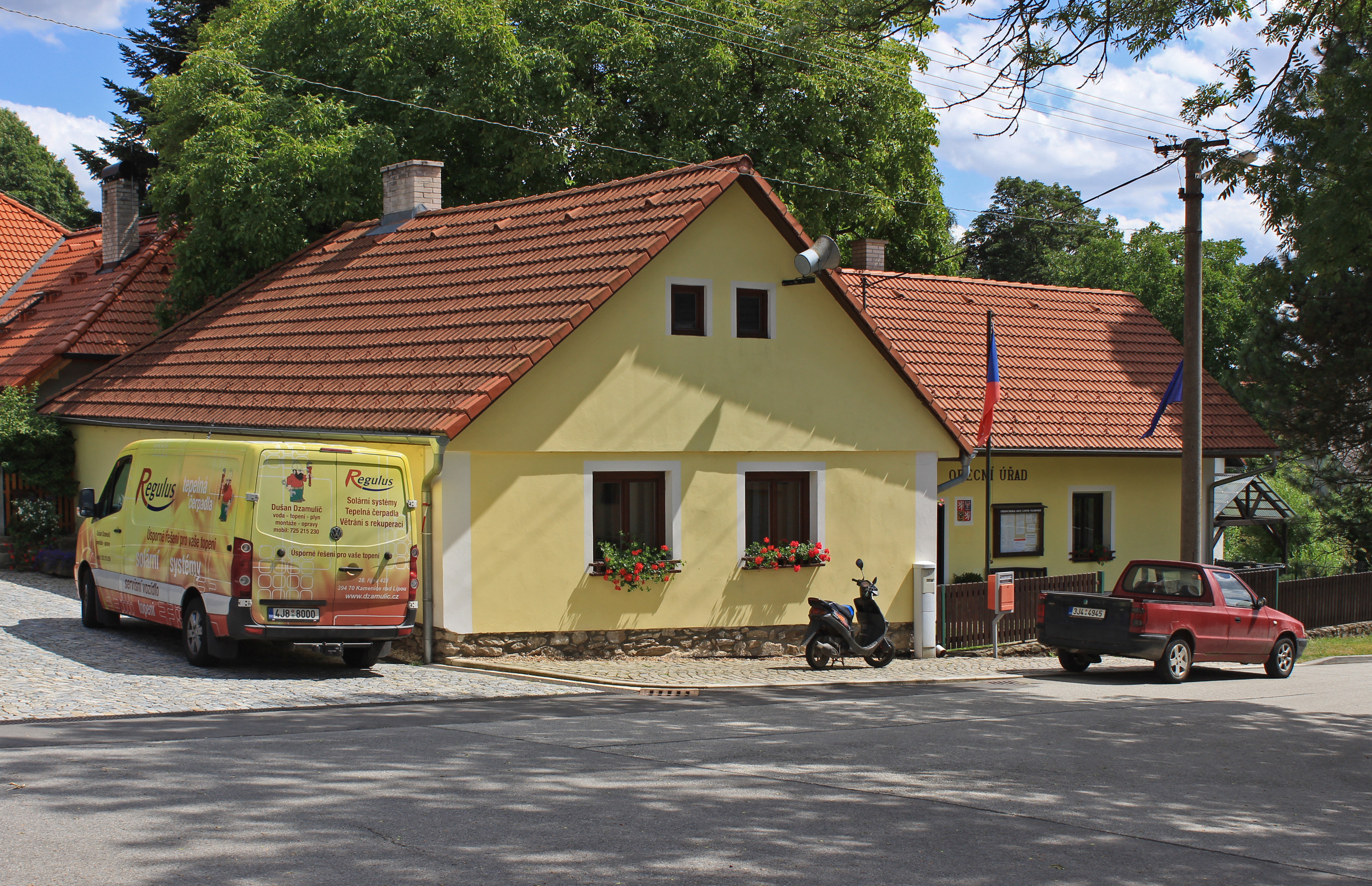
- Municipal office

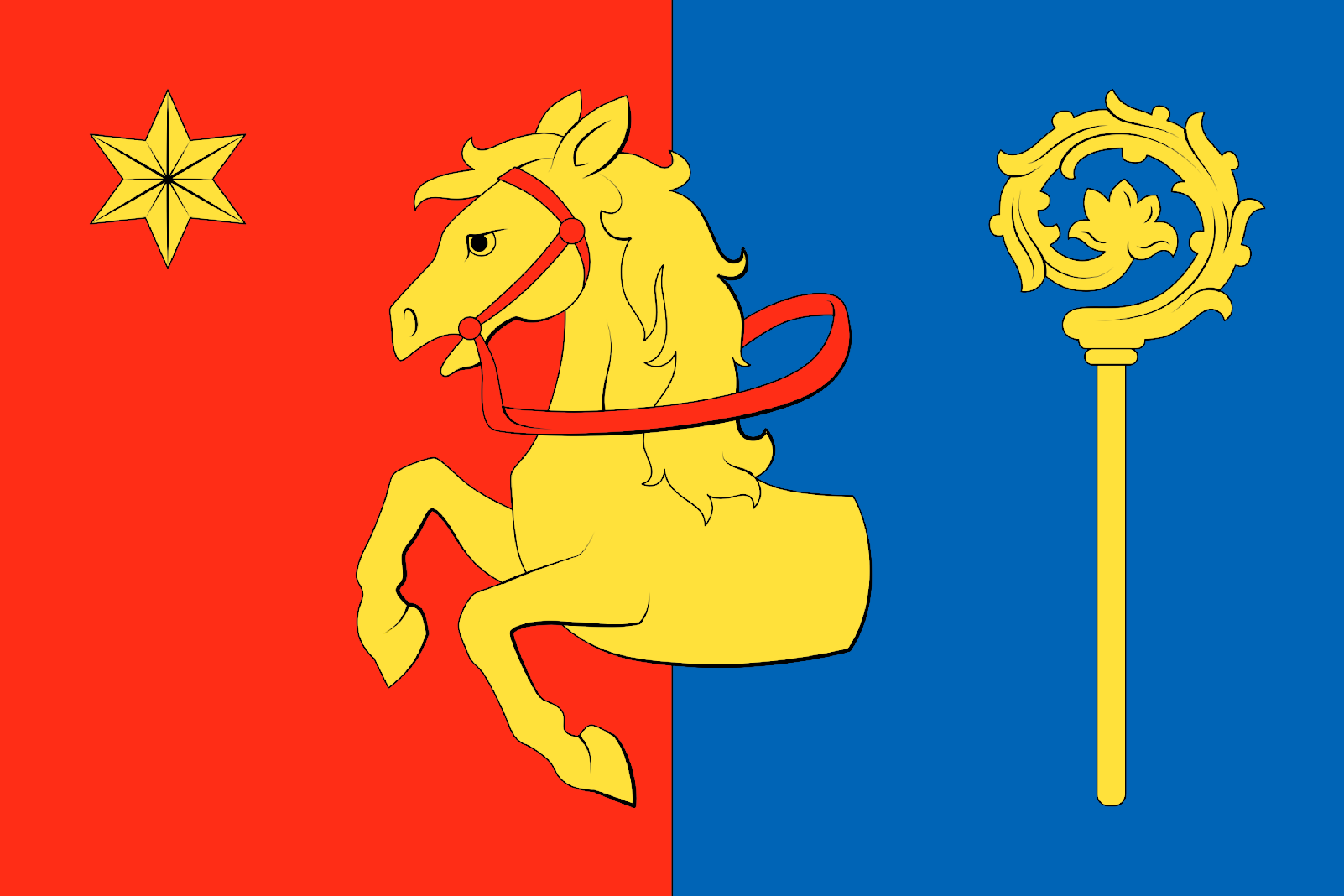
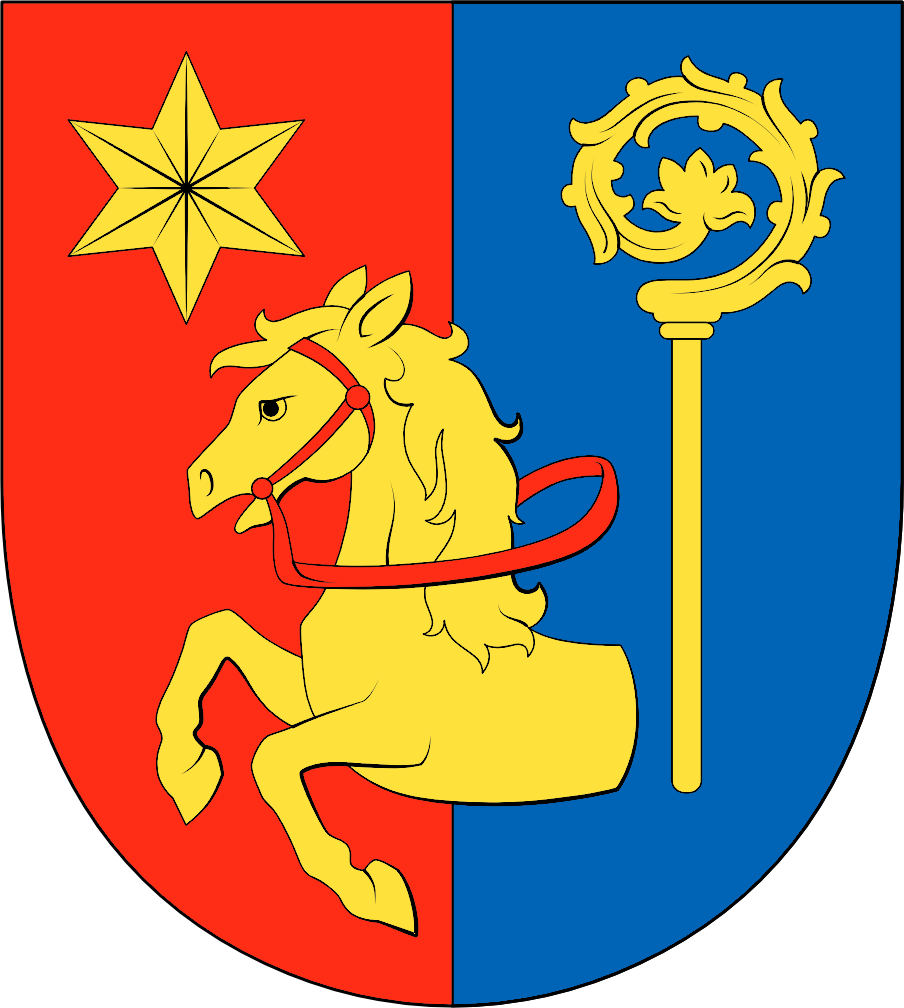
- Flag Coat of arms

- Location in the Czech Republic
- Coordinates: 49°17′41″N 15°7′50″E
- Country: Czech Republic
- Region: Vysočina
- District: Pelhřimov
- First mentioned: 1549

Area
  - Total: 7.05 km^{2} (2.72 sq mi)
- Elevation: 597 m (1,959 ft)

Population (2026-01-01)
  - Total: 116
  - Density: 16.5/km^{2} (42.6/sq mi)
- Time zone: UTC+1 (CET)
  - Summer (DST): UTC+2 (CEST)
- Postal code: 394 70
- Website: www.lhota-vlasenice.cz

Lhota-Vlasenice is a municipality in Pelhřimov District in the Vysočina Region of the Czech Republic. It has about 100 inhabitants.

Lhota-Vlasenice lies approximately 17 kilometres (11 mi) south-west of Pelhřimov, 36 km (22 mi) west of Jihlava, and 102 km (63 mi) south-east of Prague.

== Administrative division ==
Lhota-Vlasenice consists of two municipal parts (in brackets population according to the 2021 census):

- Lhota (18)
- Vlasenice (71)

== Demographics ==
Historical population
Year	Pop.	±%
1869	350	—
1880	307	−12.3%
1890	347	+13.0%
1900	366	+5.5%
1910	360	−1.6%
1921	344	−4.4%
1930	278	−19.2%
1950	216	−22.3%
1961	211	−2.3%
1970	157	−25.6%
1980	120	−23.6%
1991	82	−31.7%
2001	84	+2.4%
2011	66	−21.4%
2021	89	+34.8%
Source: Censuses
