= Vysoká Lhota =

- Municipality
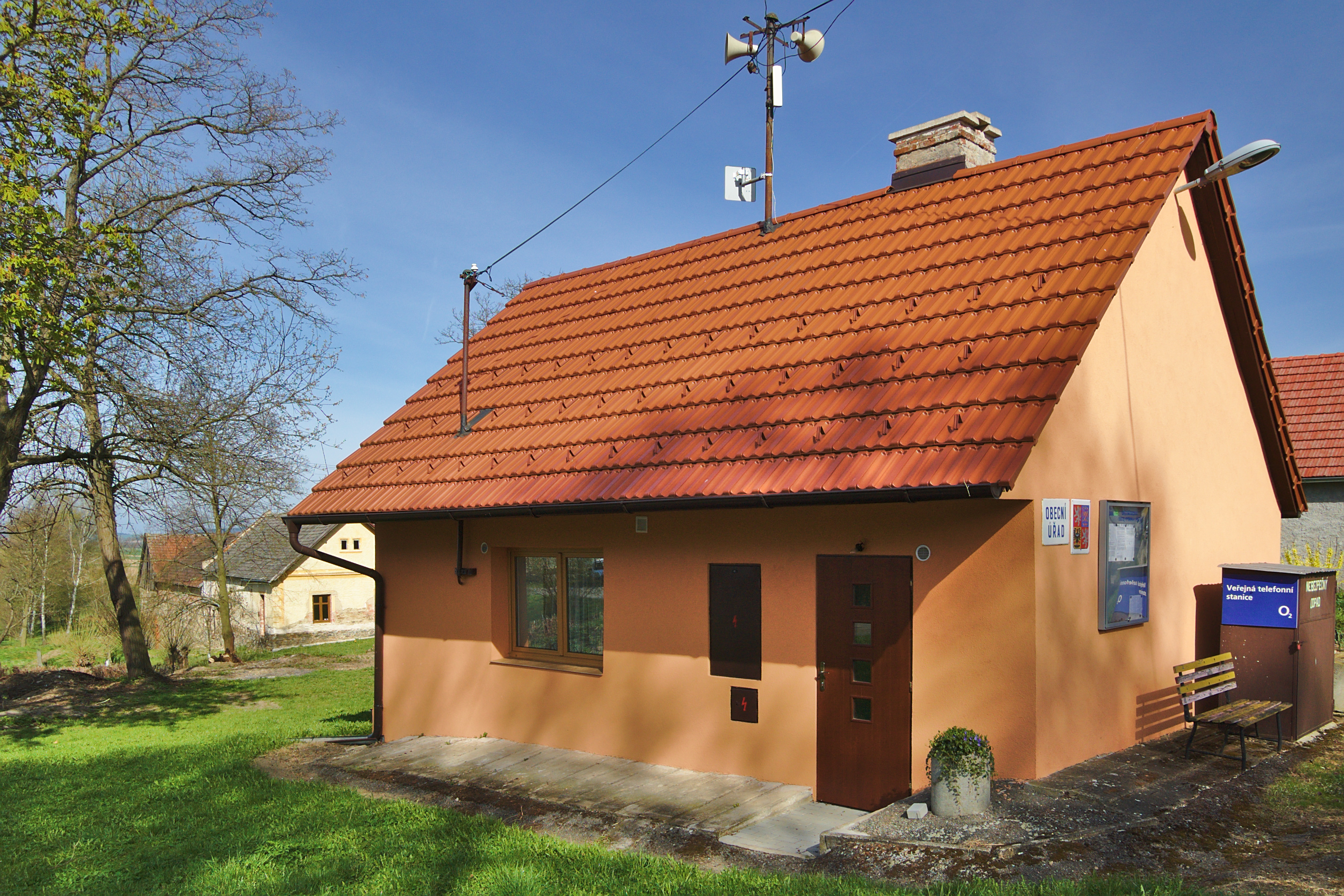
- Municipal office

- Location in the Czech Republic
- Coordinates: 49°25′0″N 15°2′32″E
- Country: Czech Republic
- Region: Vysočina
- District: Pelhřimov
- First mentioned: 1430

Area
  - Total: 3.10 km^{2} (1.20 sq mi)
- Elevation: 615 m (2,018 ft)

Population (2026-01-01)
  - Total: 16
  - Density: 5.2/km^{2} (13/sq mi)
- Time zone: UTC+1 (CET)
  - Summer (DST): UTC+2 (CEST)
- Postal code: 395 01
- Website: obecvysokalhota.webnode.cz

Vysoká Lhota is a municipality and village in Pelhřimov District in the Vysočina Region of the Czech Republic. As of 2025, it has 16 inhabitants, making it the least populous municipality of the country.

Vysoká Lhota lies approximately 13 kilometres (8 mi) west of Pelhřimov, 40 km (25 mi) west of Jihlava, and 87 km (54 mi) south-east of Prague.

== Demographics ==
Vysoká Lhota is the least populous municipality of the Czech Republic. As of 31 December 2025, it is also the municipality with the oldest population with an average age of 65.3.

Historical population
Year	Pop.	±%
1869	178	—
1880	176	−1.1%
1890	176	+0.0%
1900	151	−14.2%
1910	186	+23.2%
1921	177	−4.8%
1930	186	+5.1%
1950	103	−44.6%
1961	102	−1.0%
1970	84	−17.6%
1980	56	−33.3%
1991	43	−23.2%
2001	26	−39.5%
2011	17	−34.6%
2021	16	−5.9%
Source: Censuses
