= Prosenická Lhota =

- Municipality
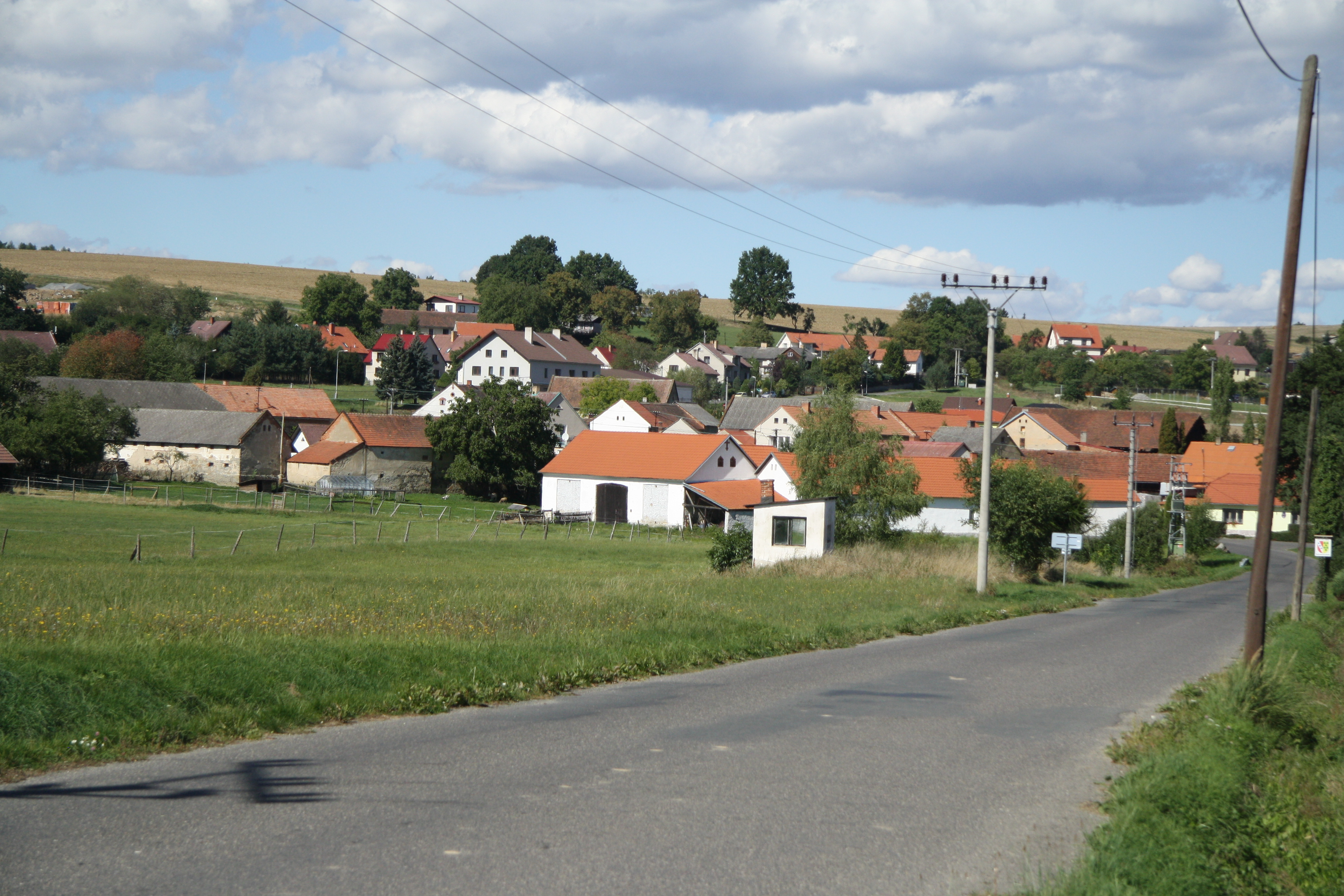
- General view

- Flag Coat of arms

- Location in the Czech Republic
- Coordinates: 49°41′23″N 14°28′58″E
- Country: Czech Republic
- Region: Central Bohemian
- District: Příbram
- First mentioned: 1561

Area
  - Total: 14.04 km^{2} (5.42 sq mi)
- Elevation: 423 m (1,388 ft)

Population (2026-01-01)
  - Total: 534
  - Density: 38.0/km^{2} (98.5/sq mi)
- Time zone: UTC+1 (CET)
  - Summer (DST): UTC+2 (CEST)
- Postal code: 264 01
- Website: www.prosenickalhota.cz

Prosenická Lhota is a municipality and village in Příbram District in the Central Bohemian Region of the Czech Republic. It has about 500 inhabitants.

== Administrative division ==
Prosenická Lhota consists of six municipal parts (in brackets population according to the 2021 census):

- Prosenická Lhota (130)
- Břišejov (17)
- Klimětice (47)
- Luhy (81)
- Prosenice (143)
- Suchdol (87)

== Demographics ==
Historical population
Year	Pop.	±%
1869	1,034	—
1880	1,049	+1.5%
1890	935	−10.9%
1900	888	−5.0%
1910	816	−8.1%
1921	778	−4.7%
1930	741	−4.8%
1950	538	−27.4%
1961	529	−1.7%
1970	473	−10.6%
1980	408	−13.7%
1991	437	+7.1%
2001	443	+1.4%
2011	458	+3.4%
2021	505	+10.3%
Source: Censuses
