= Balkova Lhota =

- Municipality
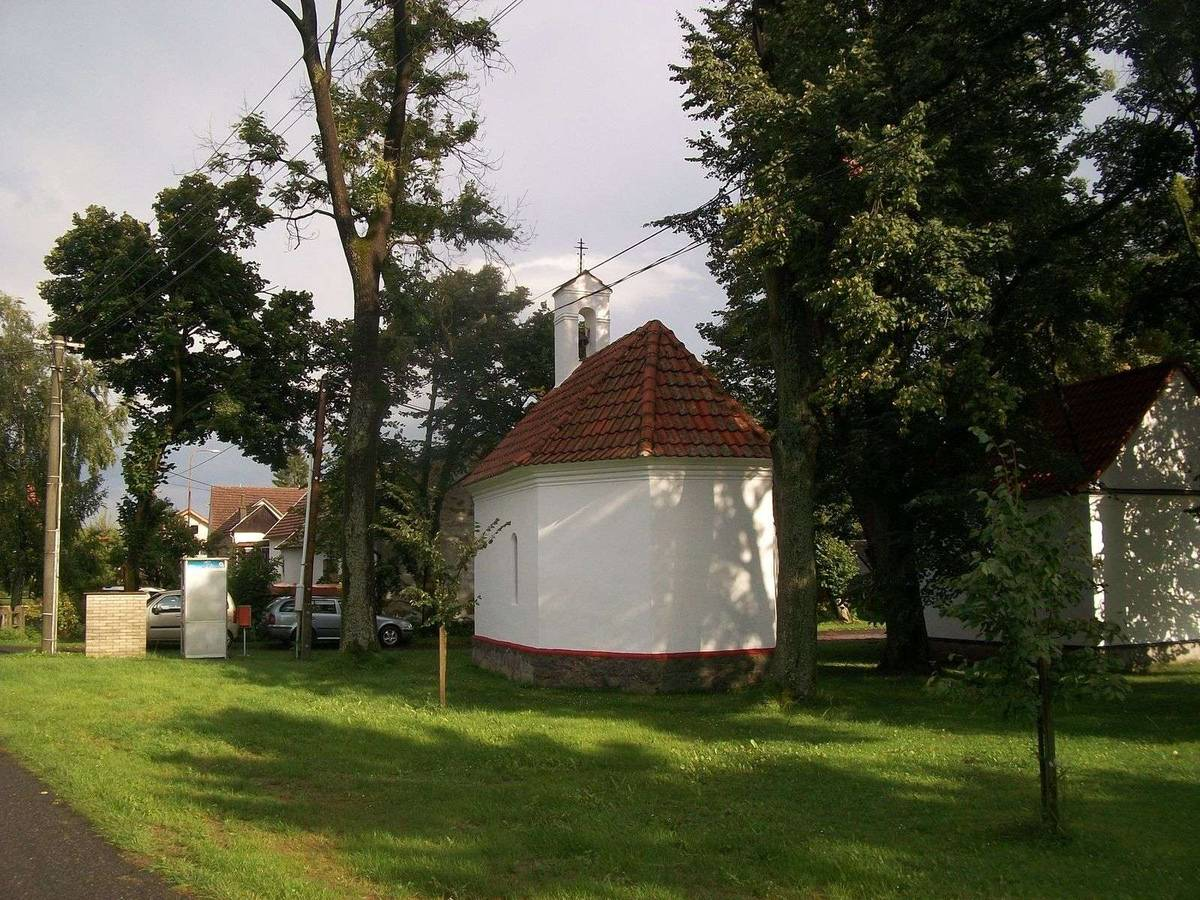
- Centre of Balkova Lhota

- Location in the Czech Republic
- Coordinates: 49°27′8″N 14°36′30″E
- Country: Czech Republic
- Region: South Bohemian
- District: Tábor
- First mentioned: 1523

Area
  - Total: 3.55 km^{2} (1.37 sq mi)
- Elevation: 493 m (1,617 ft)

Population (2026-01-01)
  - Total: 147
  - Density: 41.4/km^{2} (107/sq mi)
- Time zone: UTC+1 (CET)
  - Summer (DST): UTC+2 (CEST)
- Postal code: 391 31
- Website: www.balkovalhota.cz

Balkova Lhota is a municipality and village in Tábor District in the South Bohemian Region of the Czech Republic. It has about 100 inhabitants.

== Etymology ==
Lhota is a common Czech toponym. Until the 18th century, the village was called Lhota Čelákova ('Čelák's Lhota', from the surname Čelák). Since the beginning of the 18th century, it has been called Balkova Lhota ('Balek's Lhota') after Jan and Pavel Balek, who owned the village in the 17th century.

== Geography ==
Balkova Lhota is located about 6 kilometres (4 mi) northwest of Tábor and 53 km (33 mi) north of České Budějovice. It lies in the Tábor Uplands. The highest point is at 522 m (1,713 ft) above sea level. The fishpond Velký rybník is situated in the northern part of the municipality.

== History ==
The first written mention of Balkova Lhota is from 1523.

== Demographics ==
Historical population

Year	Pop.	±%
1869	247	—
1880	242	−2.0%
1890	271	+12.0%
1900	233	−14.0%
1910	252	+8.2%

Year	Pop.	±%
1921	241	−4.4%
1930	213	−11.6%
1950	184	−13.6%
1961	170	−7.6%
1970	145	−14.7%

Year	Pop.	±%
1980	122	−15.9%
1991	122	+0.0%
2001	124	+1.6%
2011	120	−3.2%
2021	143	+19.2%

Source: Censuses

== Transport ==
Balkova Lhota is located on the railway line Tábor–Písek.

== Sights ==
There are no protected cultural monuments in the municipality.
