= Kacákova Lhota =

- Municipality
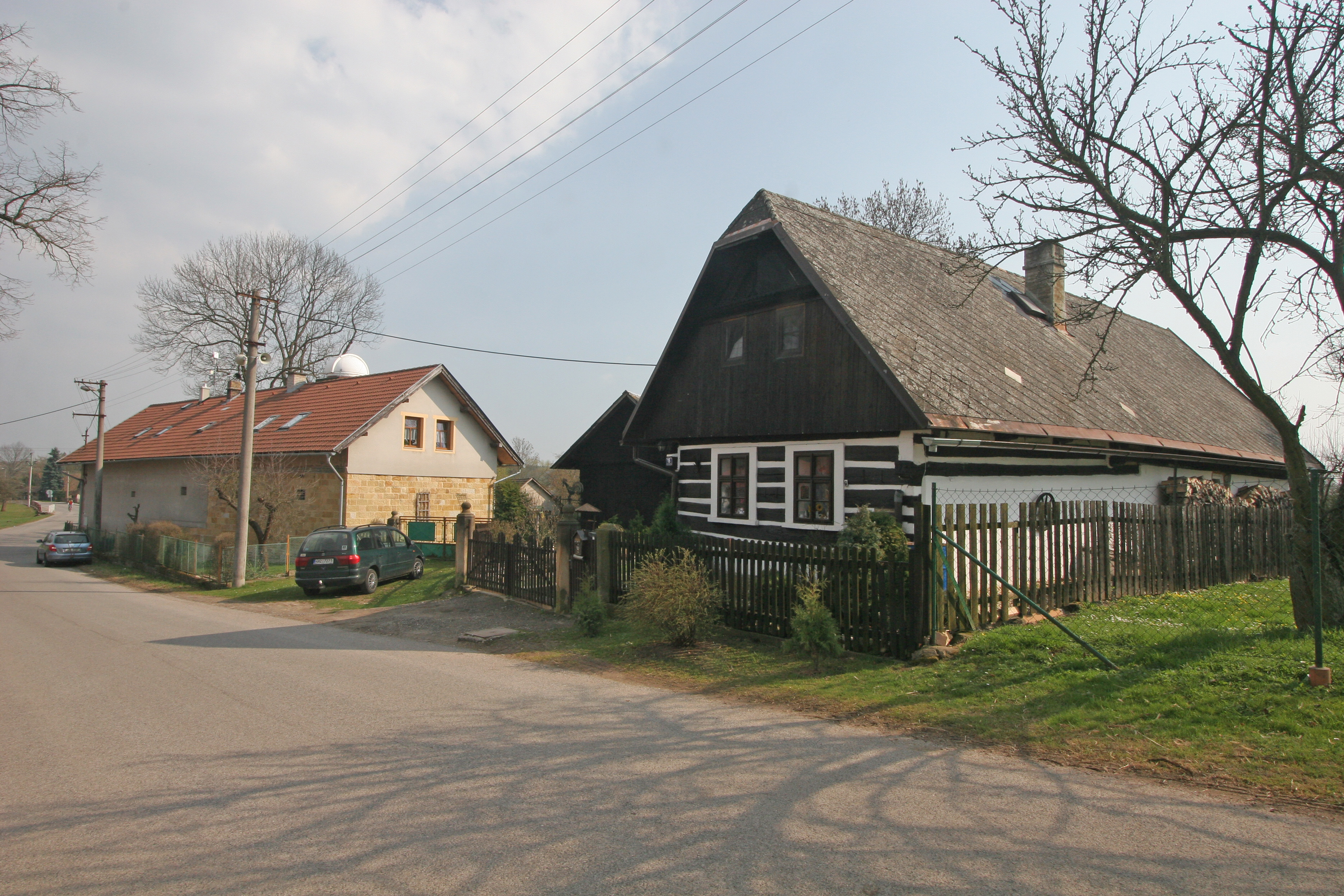
- Náchodsko, a part of Kacákova Lhota

- Location in the Czech Republic
- Coordinates: 50°24′34″N 15°25′10″E
- Country: Czech Republic
- Region: Hradec Králové
- District: Jičín
- First mentioned: 1546

Area
  - Total: 3.97 km^{2} (1.53 sq mi)
- Elevation: 267 m (876 ft)

Population (2026-01-01)
  - Total: 182
  - Density: 45.8/km^{2} (119/sq mi)
- Time zone: UTC+1 (CET)
  - Summer (DST): UTC+2 (CEST)
- Postal code: 506 01
- Website: www.kacakovalhota.cz

Kacákova Lhota is a municipality and village in Jičín District in the Hradec Králové Region of the Czech Republic. It has about 200 inhabitants.

== Administrative division ==
Kacákova Lhota consists of two municipal parts (in brackets population according to the 2021 census):

- Kacákova Lhota (138)
- Náchodsko (34)

== Demographics ==
Historical population
Year	Pop.	±%
1869	429	—
1880	452	+5.4%
1890	427	−5.5%
1900	404	−5.4%
1910	398	−1.5%
1921	334	−16.1%
1930	305	−8.7%
1950	240	−21.3%
1961	233	−2.9%
1970	185	−20.6%
1980	168	−9.2%
1991	135	−19.6%
2001	149	+10.4%
2011	150	+0.7%
2021	172	+14.7%
Source: Censuses
