= Lhota (Kladno District) =

- Municipality
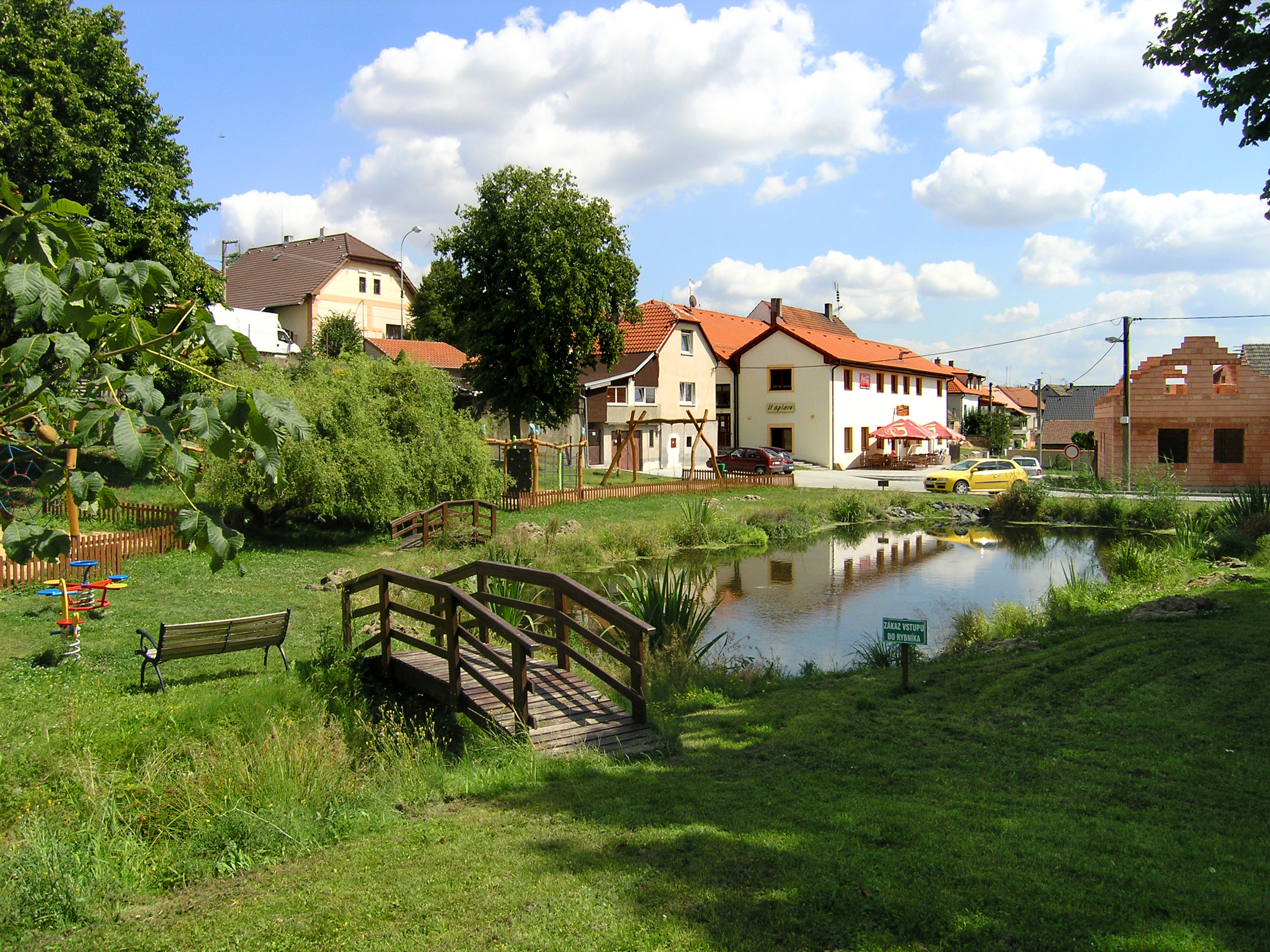
- Common in Lhota

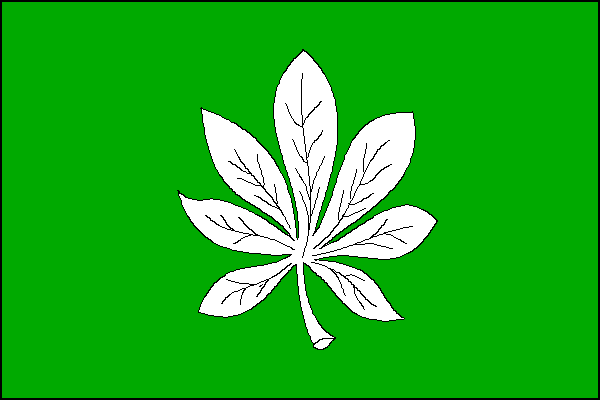
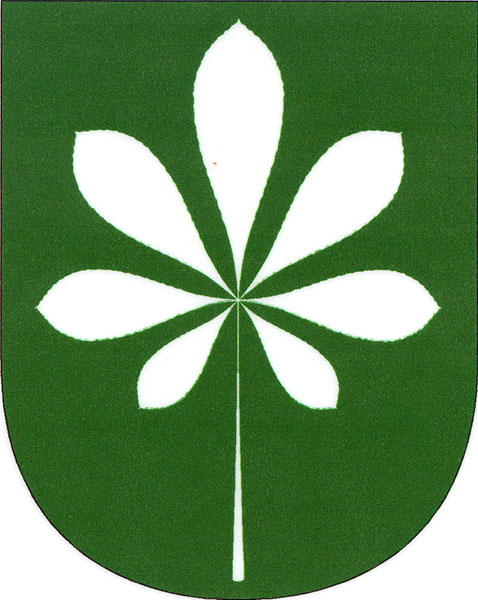
- Flag Coat of arms

- Location in the Czech Republic
- Coordinates: 50°5′19″N 14°0′43″E
- Country: Czech Republic
- Region: Central Bohemian
- District: Kladno
- First mentioned: 1530

Area
  - Total: 11.70 km^{2} (4.52 sq mi)
- Elevation: 400 m (1,300 ft)

Population (2026-01-01)
  - Total: 663
  - Density: 56.7/km^{2} (147/sq mi)
- Time zone: UTC+1 (CET)
  - Summer (DST): UTC+2 (CEST)
- Postal code: 273 01
- Website: www.lhotaukladna.cz

Lhota is a municipality and village in Kladno District in the Central Bohemian Region of the Czech Republic. It has about 700 inhabitants.

== Demographics ==
Historical population
Year	Pop.	±%
1869	505	—
1880	552	+9.3%
1890	629	+13.9%
1900	629	+0.0%
1910	680	+8.1%
1921	629	−7.5%
1930	679	+7.9%
1950	591	−13.0%
1961	610	+3.2%
1970	610	+0.0%
1980	629	+3.1%
1991	573	−8.9%
2001	535	−6.6%
2011	596	+11.4%
2021	675	+13.3%
Source: Censuses
