= Lhota u Lysic =

Municipality and village in the Czech Republic

- Municipality
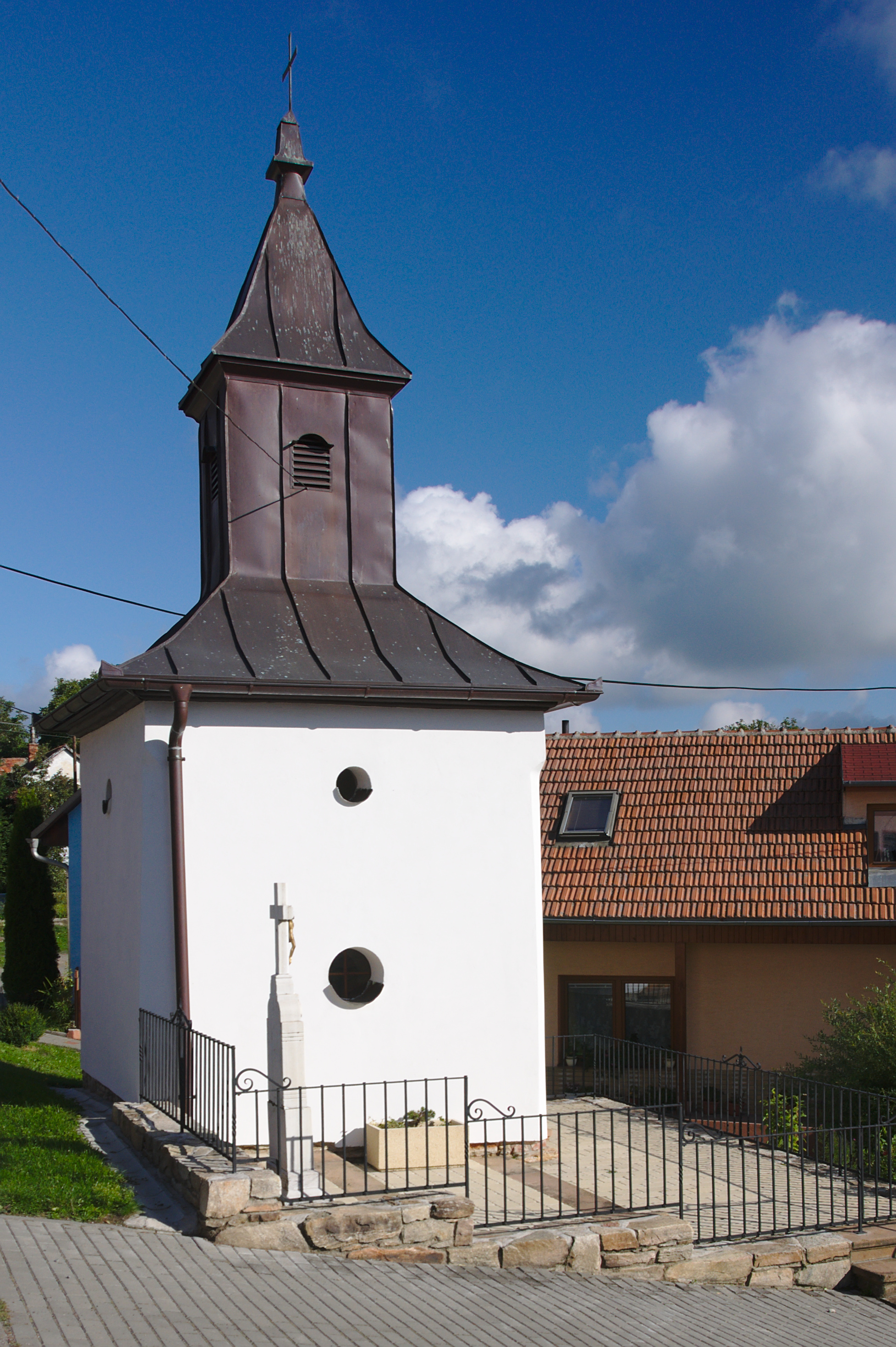
- Chapel of the Nativity of the Virgin Mary

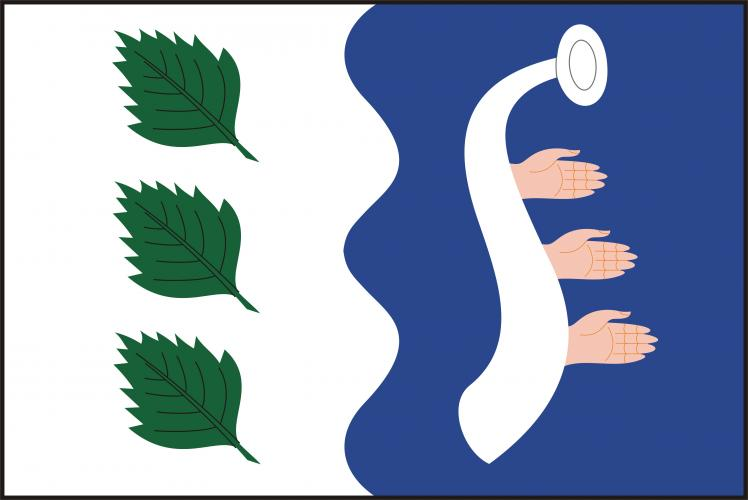
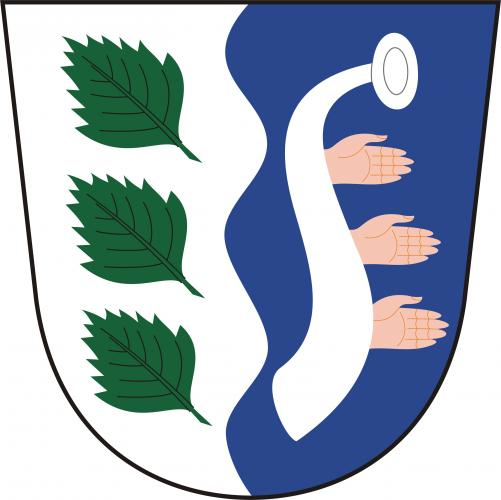
- Flag Coat of arms

- Location in the Czech Republic
- Coordinates: 49°28′11″N 16°29′49″E
- Country: Czech Republic
- Region: South Moravian
- District: Blansko
- First mentioned: 1351

Area
  - Total: 3.98 km^{2} (1.54 sq mi)
- Elevation: 530 m (1,740 ft)

Population (2026-01-01)
  - Total: 134
  - Density: 33.7/km^{2} (87.2/sq mi)
- Time zone: UTC+1 (CET)
  - Summer (DST): UTC+2 (CEST)
- Postal code: 679 71
- Website: www.lhotaulysic.cz

Lhota u Lysic is a municipality and village in Blansko District in the South Moravian Region of the Czech Republic. It has about 100 inhabitants.

Lhota u Lysic lies approximately 17 kilometres (11 mi) north-west of Blansko, 32 km (20 mi) north of Brno, and 164 km (102 mi) south-east of Prague.

== Demographics ==
Historical population
| Year | Pop. | ±% |
|---|---|---|
| 1869 | 215 | — |
| 1880 | 217 | +0.9% |
| 1890 | 219 | +0.9% |
| 1900 | 231 | +5.5% |
| 1910 | 212 | −8.2% |
| 1921 | 210 | −0.9% |
| 1930 | 202 | −3.8% |
| 1950 | 179 | −11.4% |
| 1961 | 175 | −2.2% |
| 1970 | 191 | +9.1% |
| 1980 | 172 | −9.9% |
| 1991 | 128 | −25.6% |
| 2001 | 132 | +3.1% |
| 2011 | 129 | −2.3% |
| 2021 | 128 | −0.8% |
Source: Censuses
