= Vilémovice (Blansko District) =

- Municipality
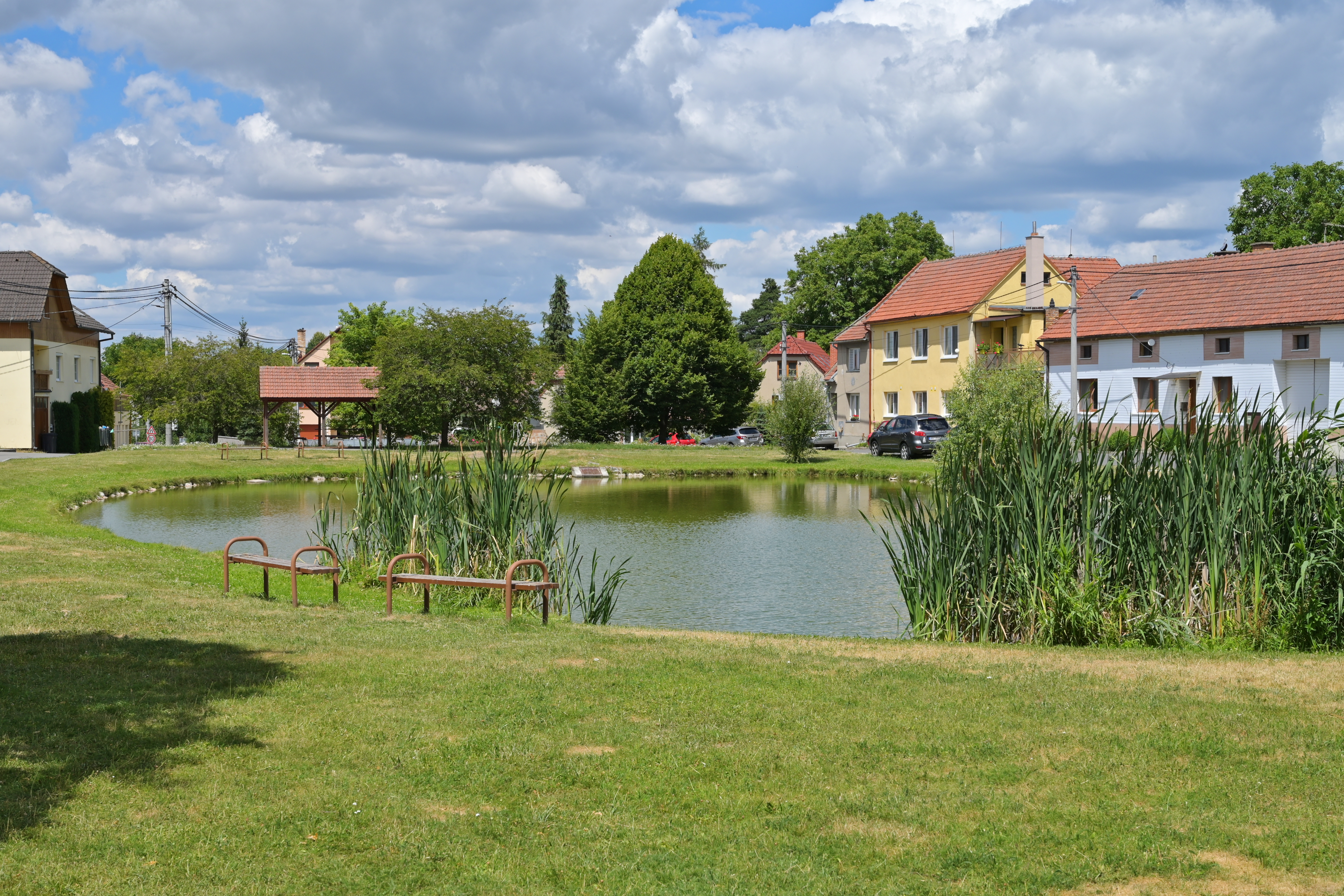
- Centre of Vilémovice with a pond

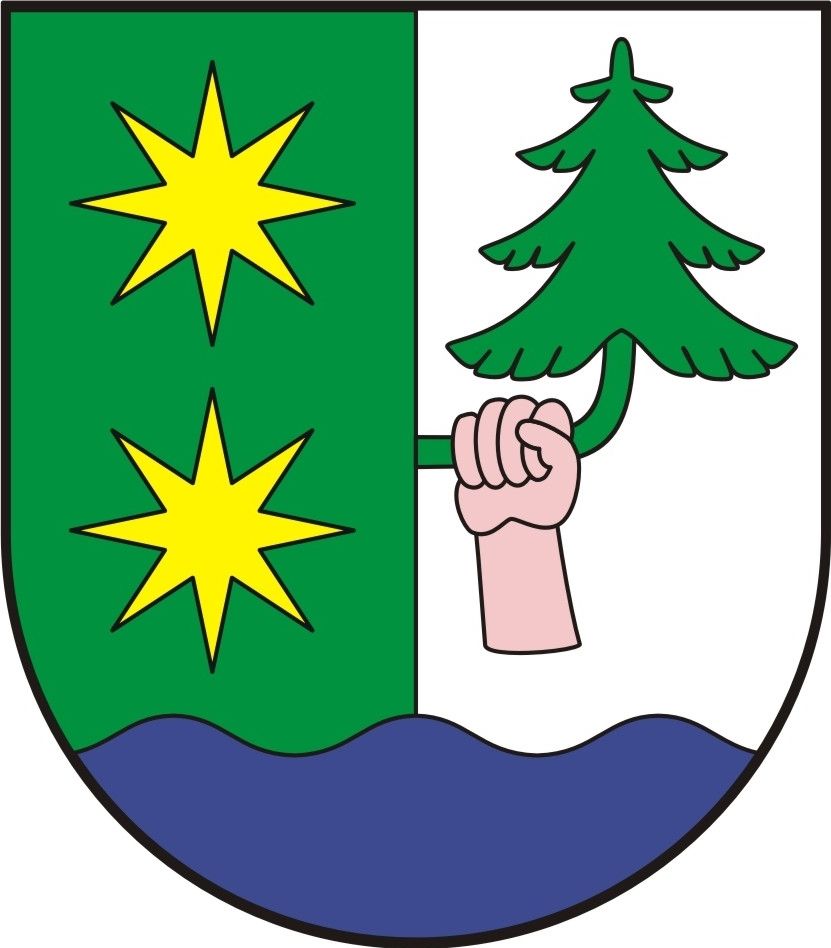
- Flag Coat of arms

- Location in the Czech Republic
- Coordinates: 49°21′50″N 16°44′48″E
- Country: Czech Republic
- Region: South Moravian
- District: Blansko
- First mentioned: 1267

Area
  - Total: 5.23 km^{2} (2.02 sq mi)
- Elevation: 497 m (1,631 ft)

Population (2026-01-01)
  - Total: 343
  - Density: 65.6/km^{2} (170/sq mi)
- Time zone: UTC+1 (CET)
  - Summer (DST): UTC+2 (CEST)
- Postal code: 679 06
- Website: www.vilemovice.cz

Vilémovice is a municipality and village in Blansko District in the South Moravian Region of the Czech Republic. It has about 300 inhabitants. The municipality is known for the Macocha Gorge, the deepest sinkhole in Central Europe.

== Geography ==
Vilémovice is located about 7 kilometres (4 mi) east of Blansko and 19 km (12 mi) north of Brno. It lies in the Drahany Highlands. The highest point is at 543 m (1,781 ft) above sea level. Vilémovice lies in the Moravian Karst Protected Landscape Area. Macocha Gorge, the deepest sinkhole of its kind in Central Europe, is located in the municipal territory.

== History ==
The first written mention of Vilémovice is from 1267. The village was divided into two parts, one belonging to the Holštejn estate and one belonging to the Blansko estate.

== Demographics ==
Historical population

Year	Pop.	±%
1869	532	—
1880	582	+9.4%
1890	576	−1.0%
1900	565	−1.9%
1910	659	+16.6%

Year	Pop.	±%
1921	616	−6.5%
1930	610	−1.0%
1950	542	−11.1%
1961	525	−3.1%
1970	461	−12.2%

Year	Pop.	±%
1980	388	−15.8%
1991	302	−22.2%
2001	303	+0.3%
2011	283	−6.6%
2021	310	+9.5%

Source: Censuses

== Transport ==
There are no railways or major roads passing through the municipality.

== Sights ==
There are no protected cultural monuments in the municipality. The main landmark of Vilémovice is the Chapel of Saint Peter of Alcántara. It was built in 1725.

== Notable people ==
- František Ševčík (1942–2017), ice hockey player
