= Punkva =

River in the Czech Republic

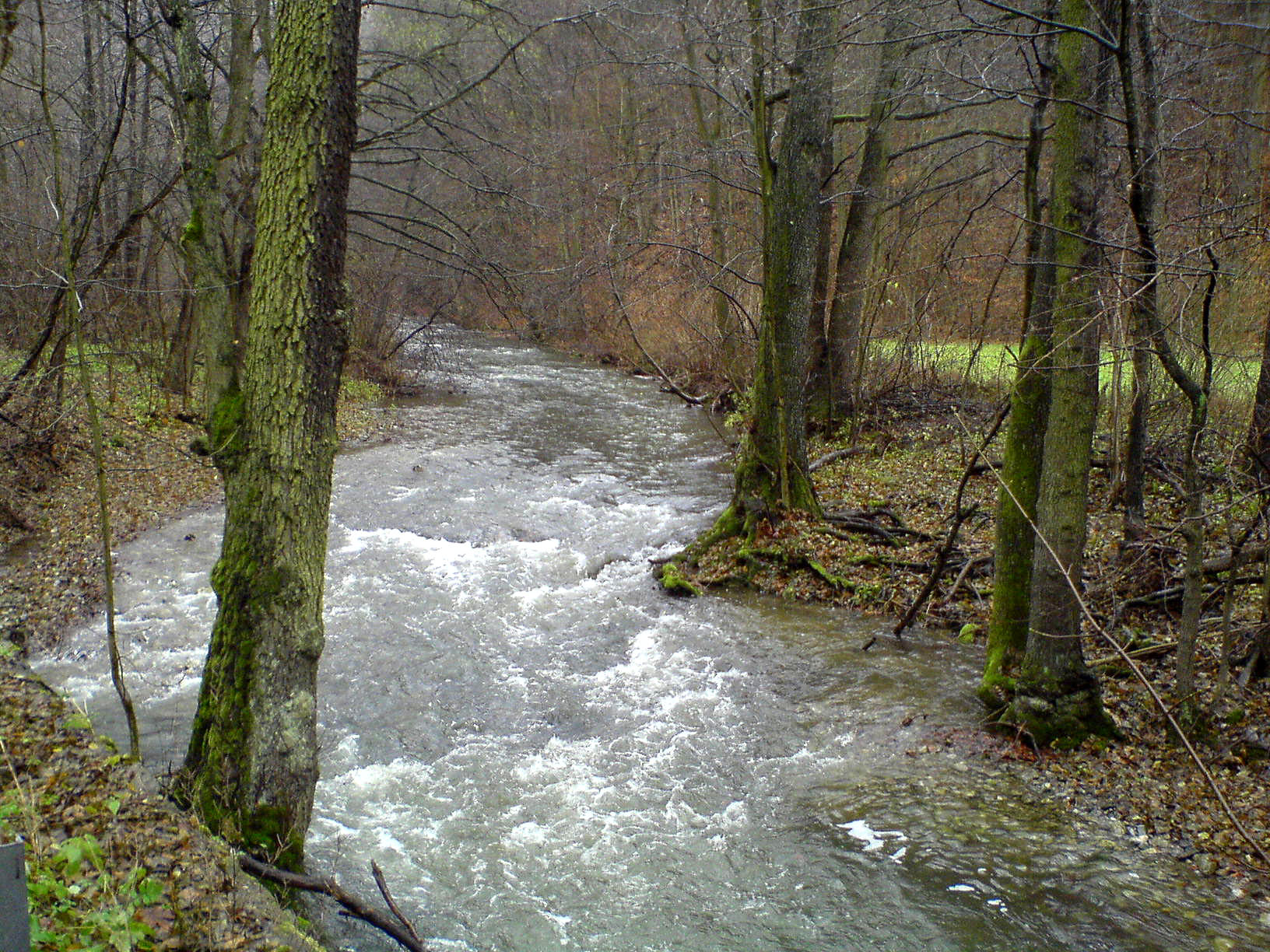
- The Punkva in Moravian Karst

Location
- Country: Czech Republic
- Region: South Moravian; Olomouc

Physical characteristics
- Source
  - location: Svitavy, Svitavy Uplands
  - coordinates: 49°29′32″N 16°47′28″E
  - elevation: 693 m (2,274 ft)
- Mouth
  - location: Svitava
  - coordinates: 49°20′55″N 16°39′8″E
  - elevation: 267 m (876 ft)
- Length: 26.4 km (16.4 mi)
- Basin size: 170 km^{2} (66 sq mi)
- Discharge
  - average: 0.96 m^{3}/s (34 cu ft/s) near estuary

Basin features
- Progression: Svitava→ Svratka→ Thaya→ Morava→ Danube→ Black Sea

The Punkva (also called Luha upstream) is a river in the Czech Republic, a left tributary of the Svitava River. It flows through the South Moravian and Olomouc regions. It is 26.4 km (16.4 mi) long. It is the longest underground river in the Czech Republic.

== Course ==
The river forms underground as a confluence of two other underground streams. Sloupský potok is the large of the two and enters the underground within the Sloup-Šošuvka cave system near Sloup. Its own source is the Luha, which is therefore Punkva's ultimate source. The other source is Bílá Voda, which sinks near Nová Rasovna cave by Holštejn.

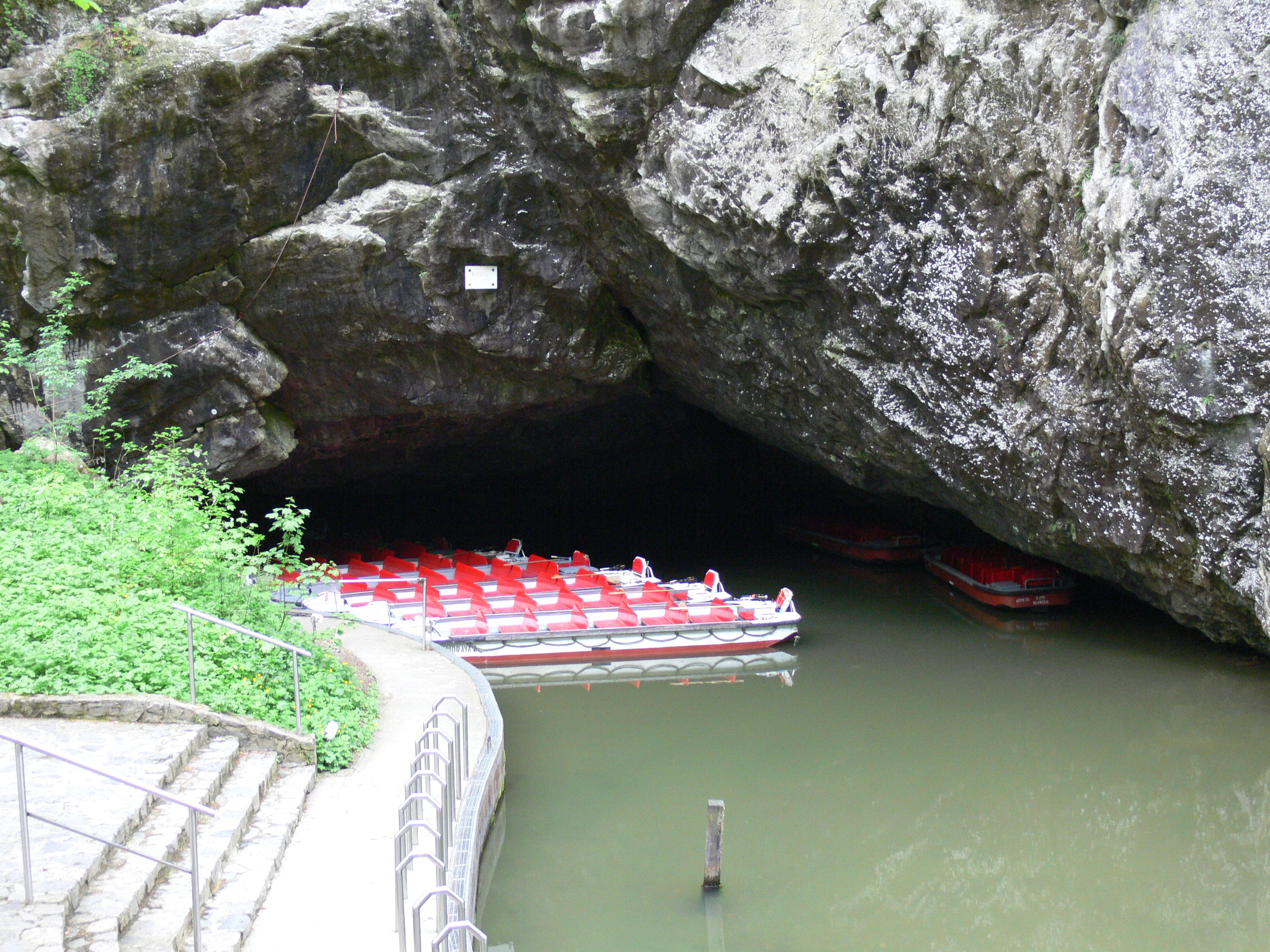
Punkva exiting the Punkva Caves system

The river flows into the Macocha Gorge and forms a small lake at the bottom. The water reenters the underground thereafter and forms the Punkva Caves, which are a tourist attraction attached to Macocha. Tourists are taken by boat through a part of the system.

After leaving the caves the Punkva flows through a valley and several fish ponds. Multiple small local streams are its right tributaries. It enters the Svitava on the southern side of Blansko and its flow joins the Danube watershed.
