= Macocha Gorge =

Sinkhole in the Czech Republic

- Macocha Abyss propast Macocha
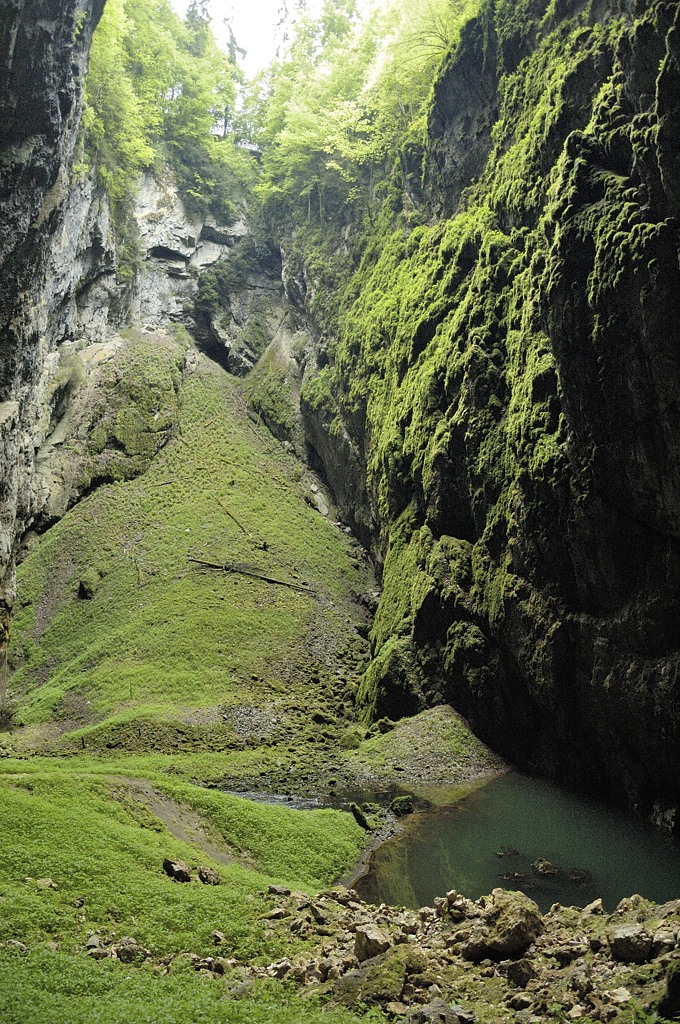
- Macocha
- Interactive map of Macocha Gorge
- Location: Vilémovice, Czech Republic
- Coordinates: 49°22′23″N 16°43′47″E
- Depth: 138.5 metres (454 ft)
- Length: 174 metres (571 ft)

The Macocha Abyss (Czech: propast Macocha), also known as the Macocha Gorge, is a sinkhole in the Moravian Karst cave system of the Czech Republic. The sinkhole is 138.5 metres (454 ft) deep, which makes it the deepest of its kind (light hole type) in Central Europe. It is a popular tourist attraction for casual visitors to the region, in addition to cavers and advanced technical divers.

== Location ==
Macocha Abyss is located in the Vilémovice municipality in the South Moravian Region, 20 kilometres (12 mi) north of the city of Brno. It is part of the Punkva Caves and the Punkva River flows through it.

== Description ==
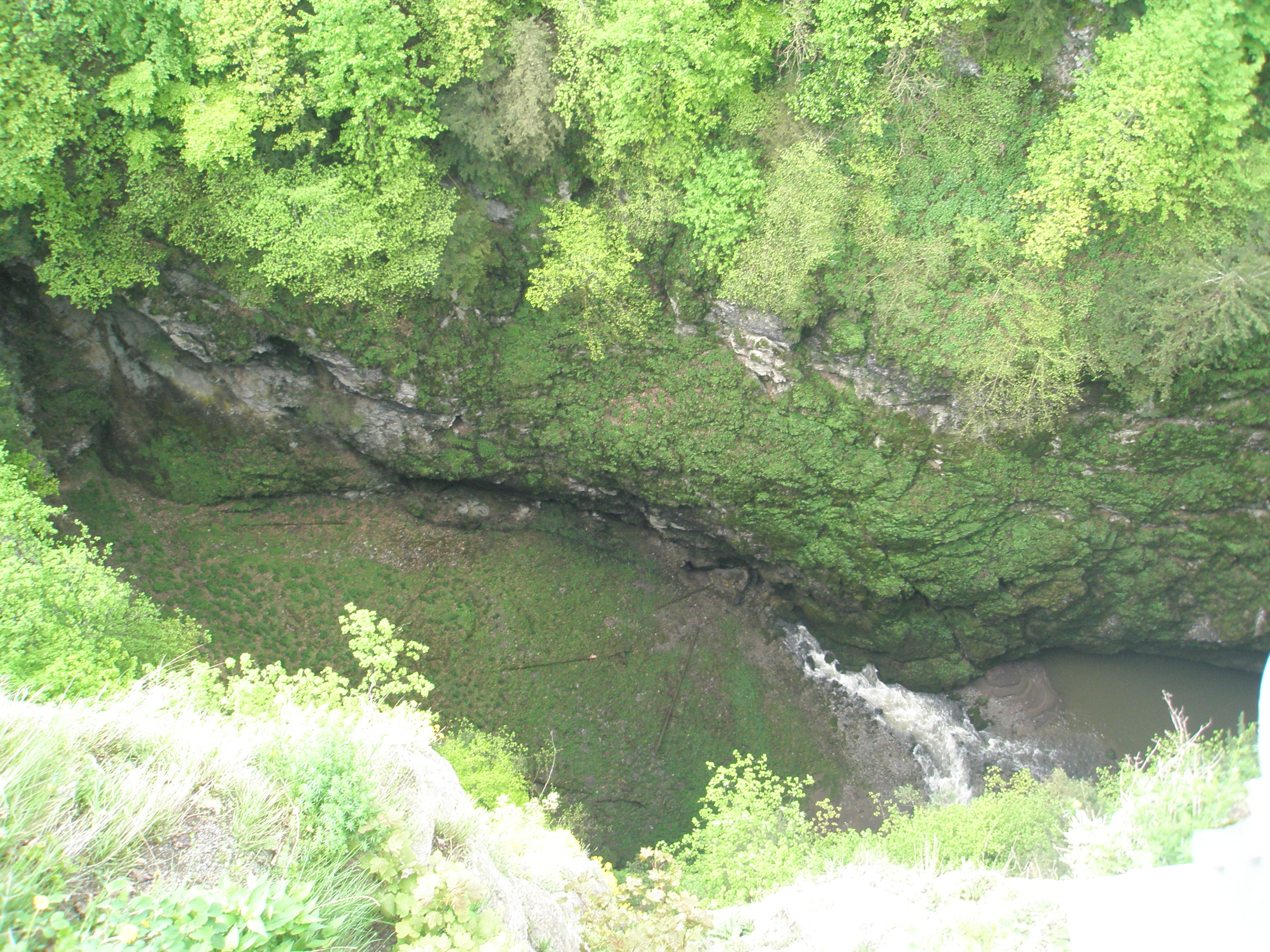
Top view

The abyss is 174 metres (571 ft) long and 76 metres (249 ft) wide. It is 138.5 metres (454 ft) deep to the surface of Dolní Lake. Below the surface of Dolní Lake are other underground spaces, so far explored to a total depth of 187.5 metres (615 ft). The dimensions of the abyss allow for its overall daylight and therefore it is classified in the "light hole" abyss category.

At the beginning of the Pustý Žleb (Desolate Canyon), below the town of Sloup, the waters of the Sloupský Brook (one of the tributaries of the subterranean river Punkva) helped to form an extensive system of underground passages, domes and abysses. This system, measuring approximately 650 metres (2,130 ft), is known as the Sloupsko-šošůvské jeskyně (Sloup-Šošůvka Caves). At 3,000 metres (9,800 ft) long, the viewing circuit is the longest underground trail open to the public in the Czech Republic.

== Etymology ==
The name Macocha is derived from macecha, meaning "stepmother". According to a popular folk story, the abyss was named after an evil stepmother who married a widowed farmer from a nearby village. The farmer had a son whom she accepted until she gave birth to her own son. Knowing her child wouldn't inherit anything, she lured her stepson to the abyss and threw him into it. Once she realized what she's done, she decided to end her own life by jumping into the abyss as well. Surprisingly, her stepson survived, and was eventually saved by his father and other villagers. Another version of the story says that the stepmother did not commit suicide, but was instead thrown into the abyss after the villagers learnt what she had done to her stepson.

== See also ==
- Karst
