= František Ševčík =

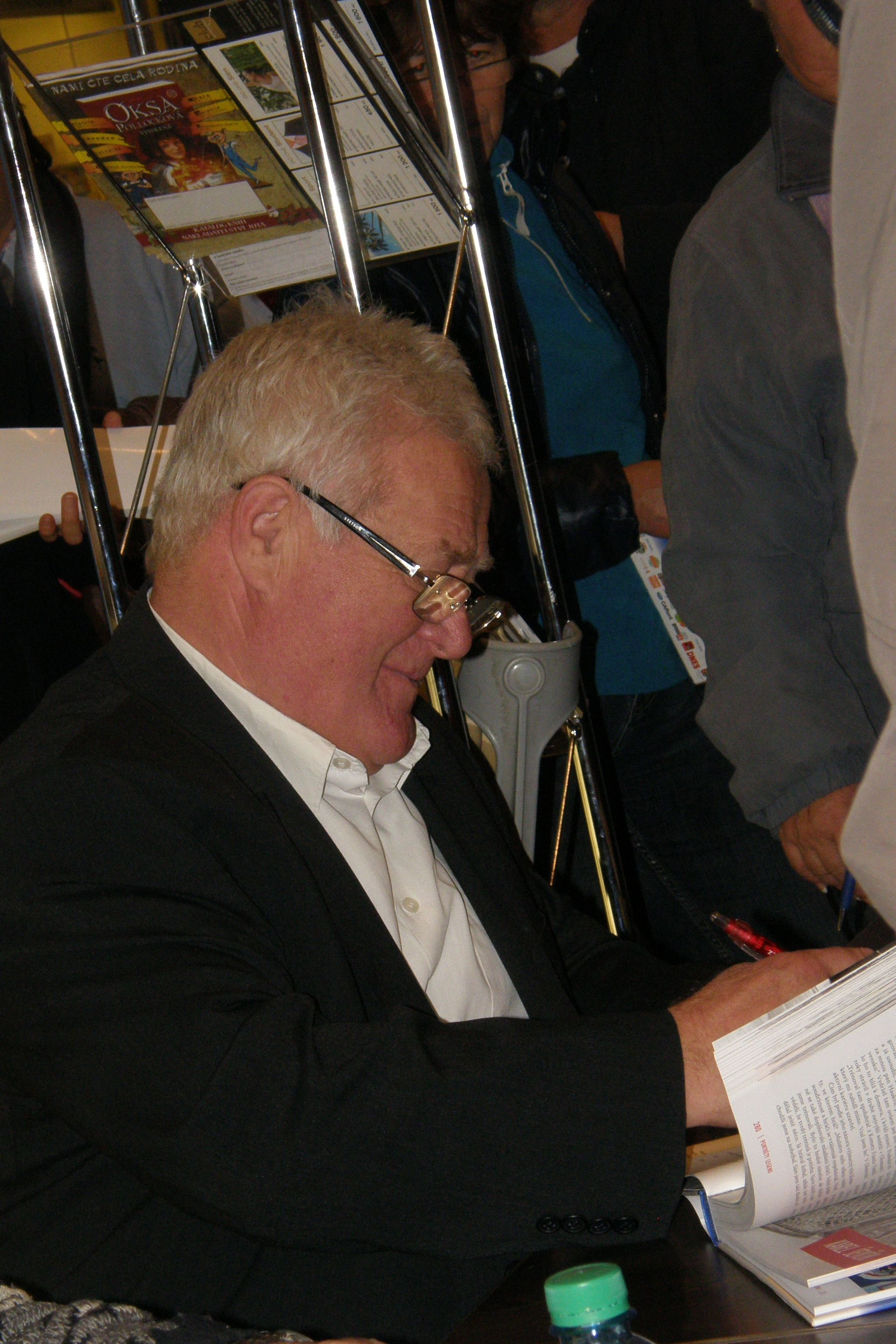
- Ševčík in 2011
- Born: January 11, 1942 Vilémovice, Bohemia and Moravia
- Died: July 22, 2017 (aged 75)
- Height: 5 ft 7 in (170 cm)
- Weight: 168 lb (76 kg; 12 st 0 lb)
- Position: Right wing
- Shot: Right
- Played for: TJ ZKL Brno
- National team: Czechoslovakia
- Playing career: 1961–1977
Medal record
Men's ice hockey
Representing Czechoslovakia
Olympic Games
Silver medal – second place	1968 Grenoble	Team

František Ševčík (January 11, 1942 – July 22, 2017) was an ice hockey player who played for the Czechoslovak national team. He won a silver medal at the 1968 Winter Olympics.
