= Punkva Caves =

Cave system of the Czech Republic

Coordinates: 49°22′23″N 16°43′47″E

Designations

Ramsar Wetland
- Official name: Punkva subterranean stream
- Designated: 18 March 2004
- Reference no.: 1413

The Punkva Caves (Czech: Punkevní jeskyně) are a cave system of the Czech Republic located north of the city of Brno, near the town of Blansko. The Punkva River flows through it. Part of it is the Macocha Abyss, its sinkhole is about 138.7 meters deep and also the deepest of its kind (light hole type) in Central Europe. It is a popular tourist attraction for casual visitors to the region, in addition to cavers and advanced technical divers.

== Gallery ==
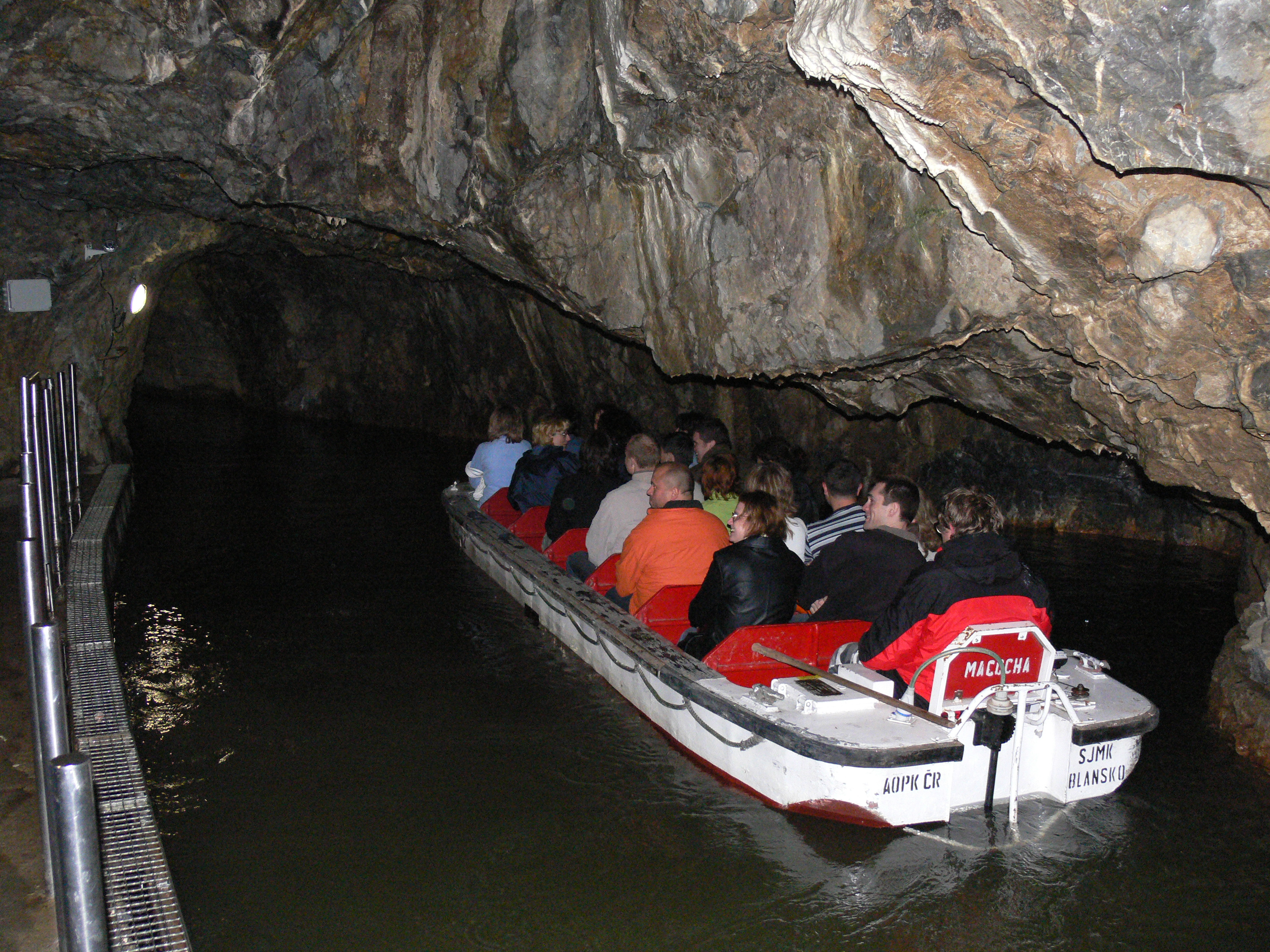

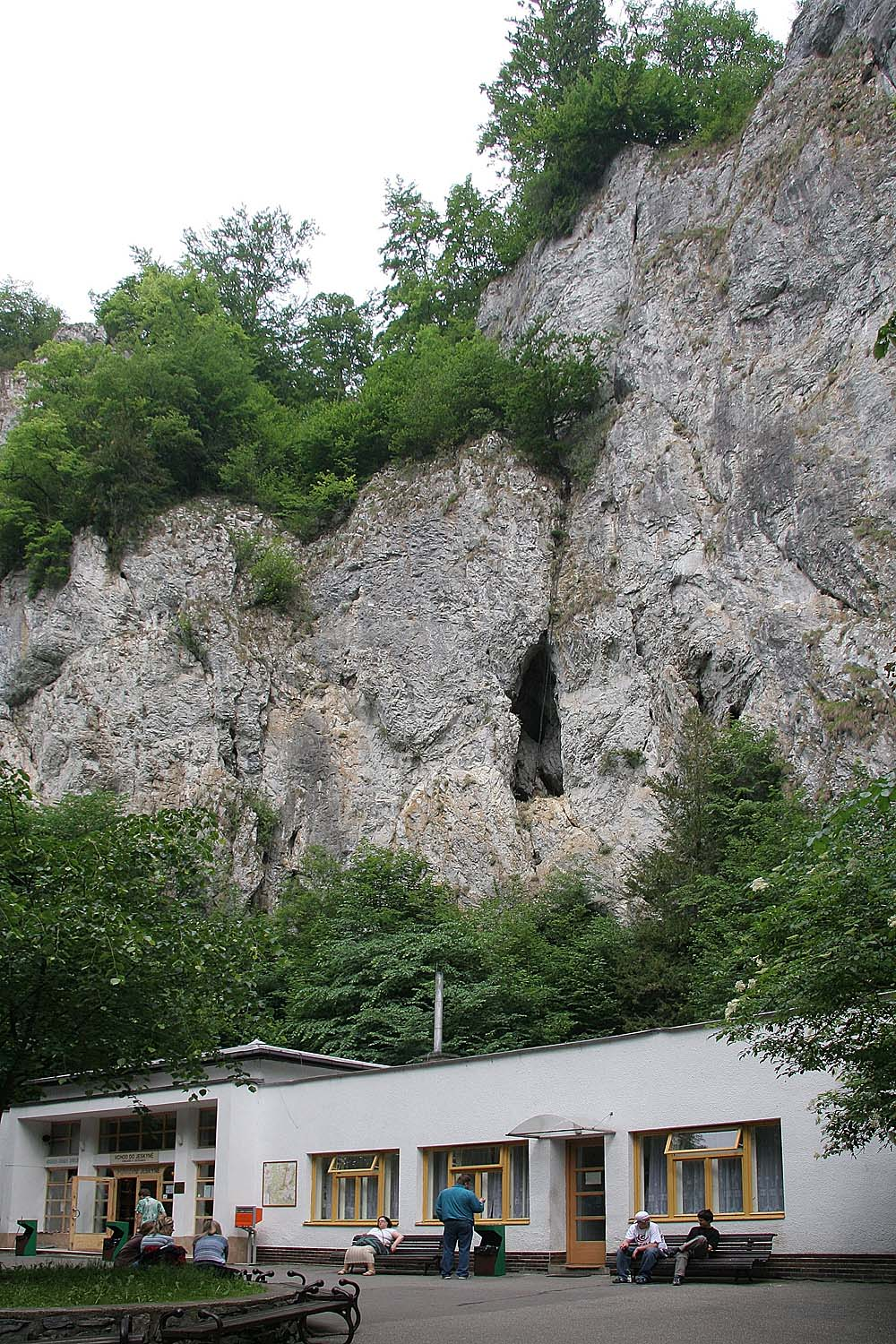

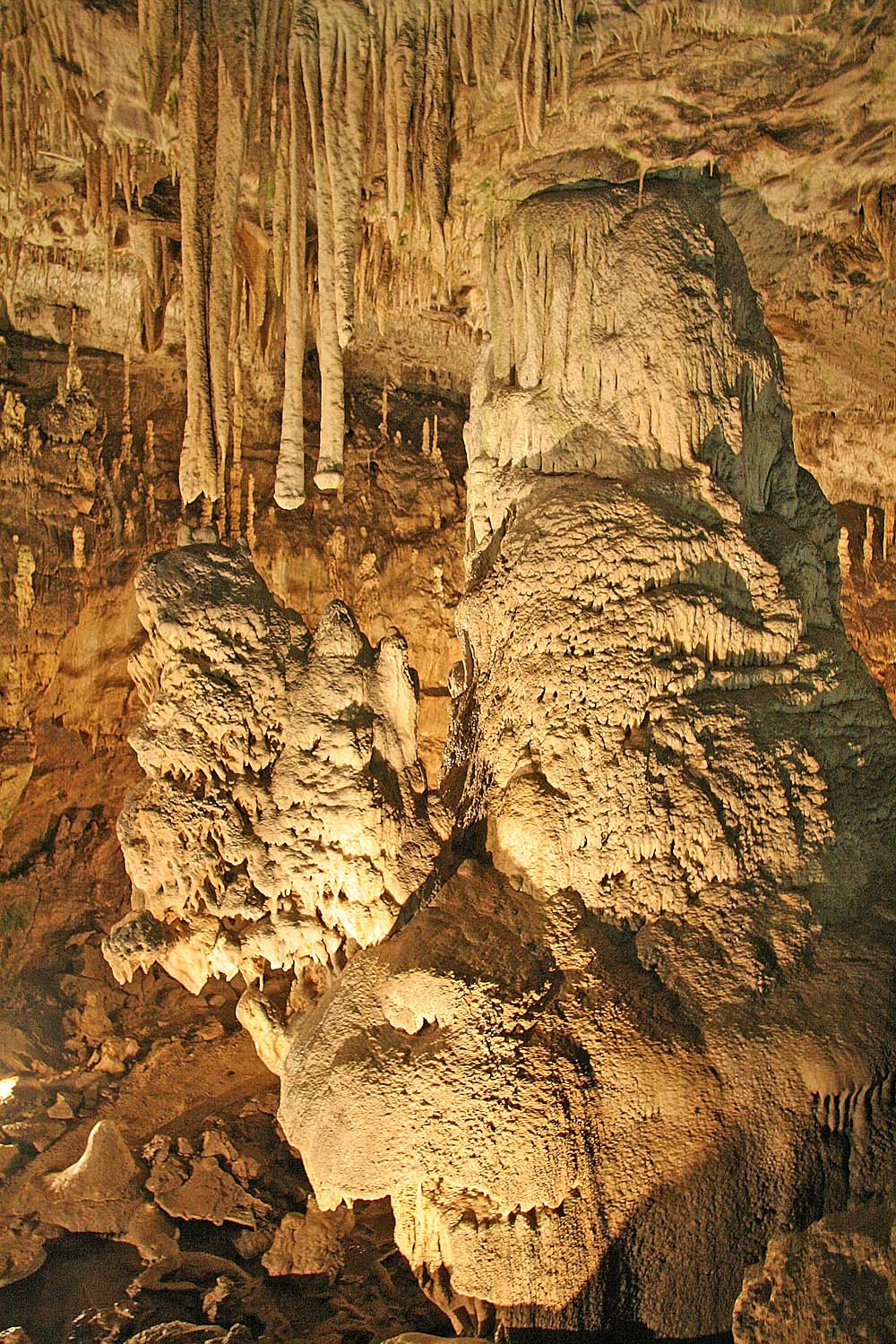
Přední dóm

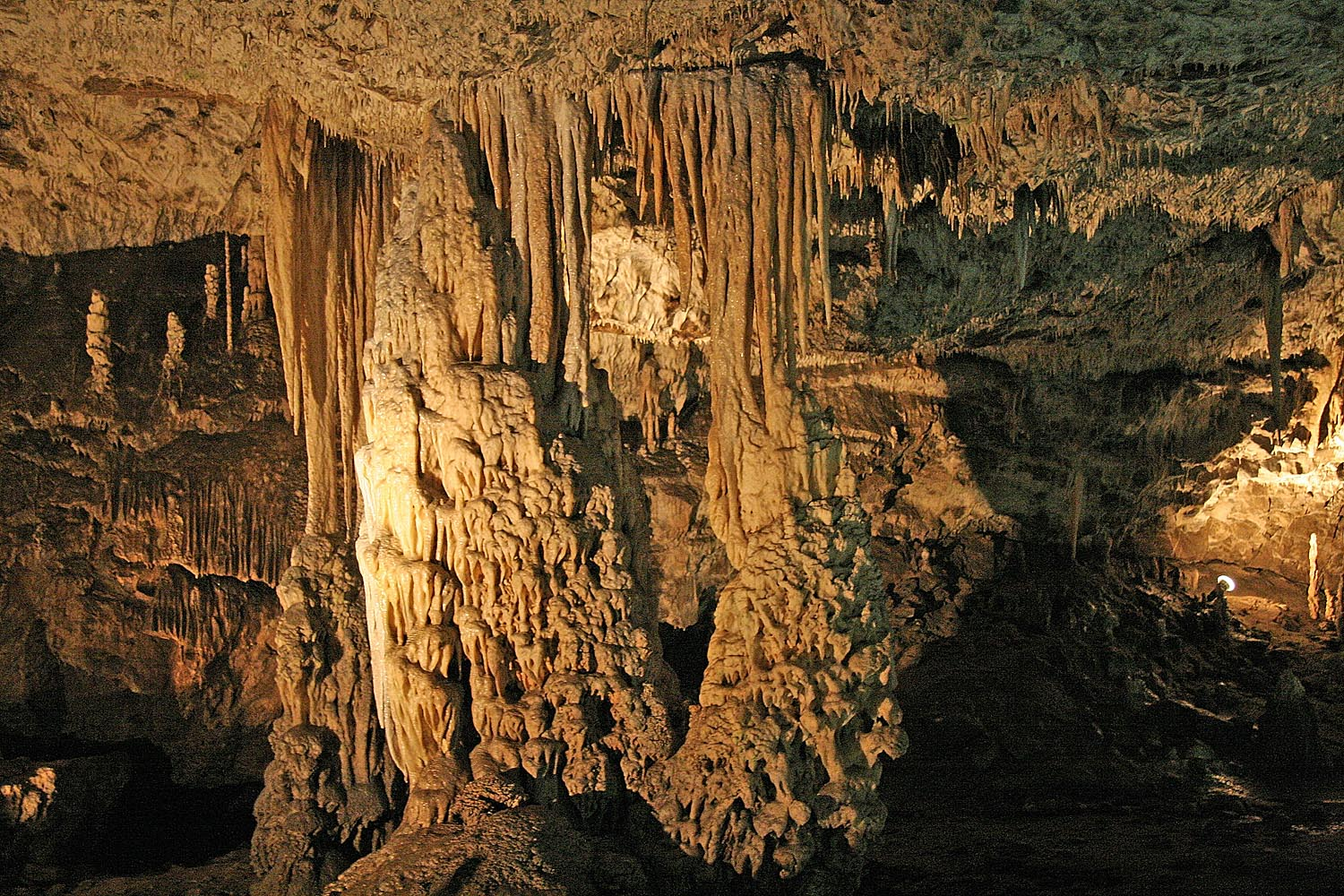
Přední dóm

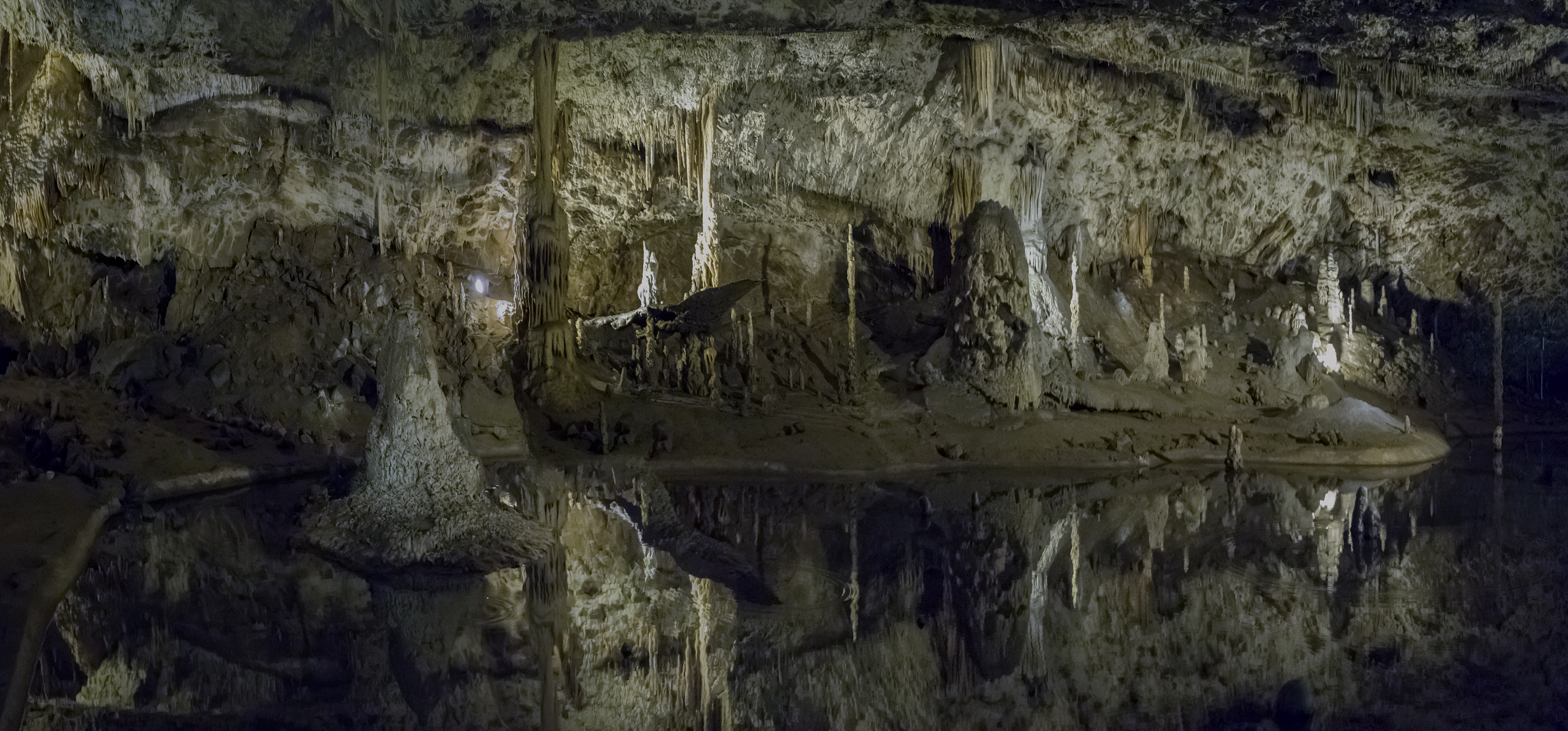

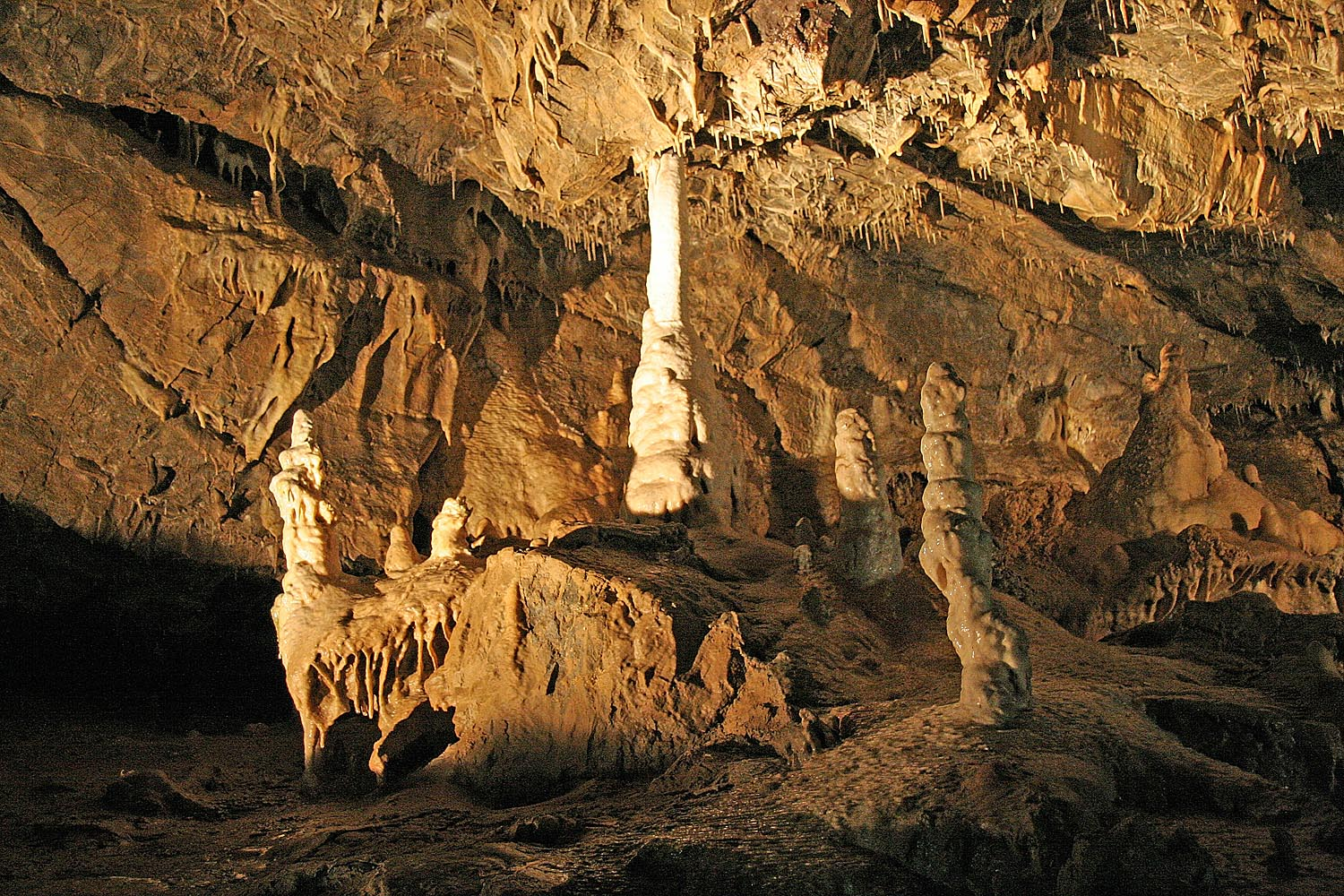
Stalagmites

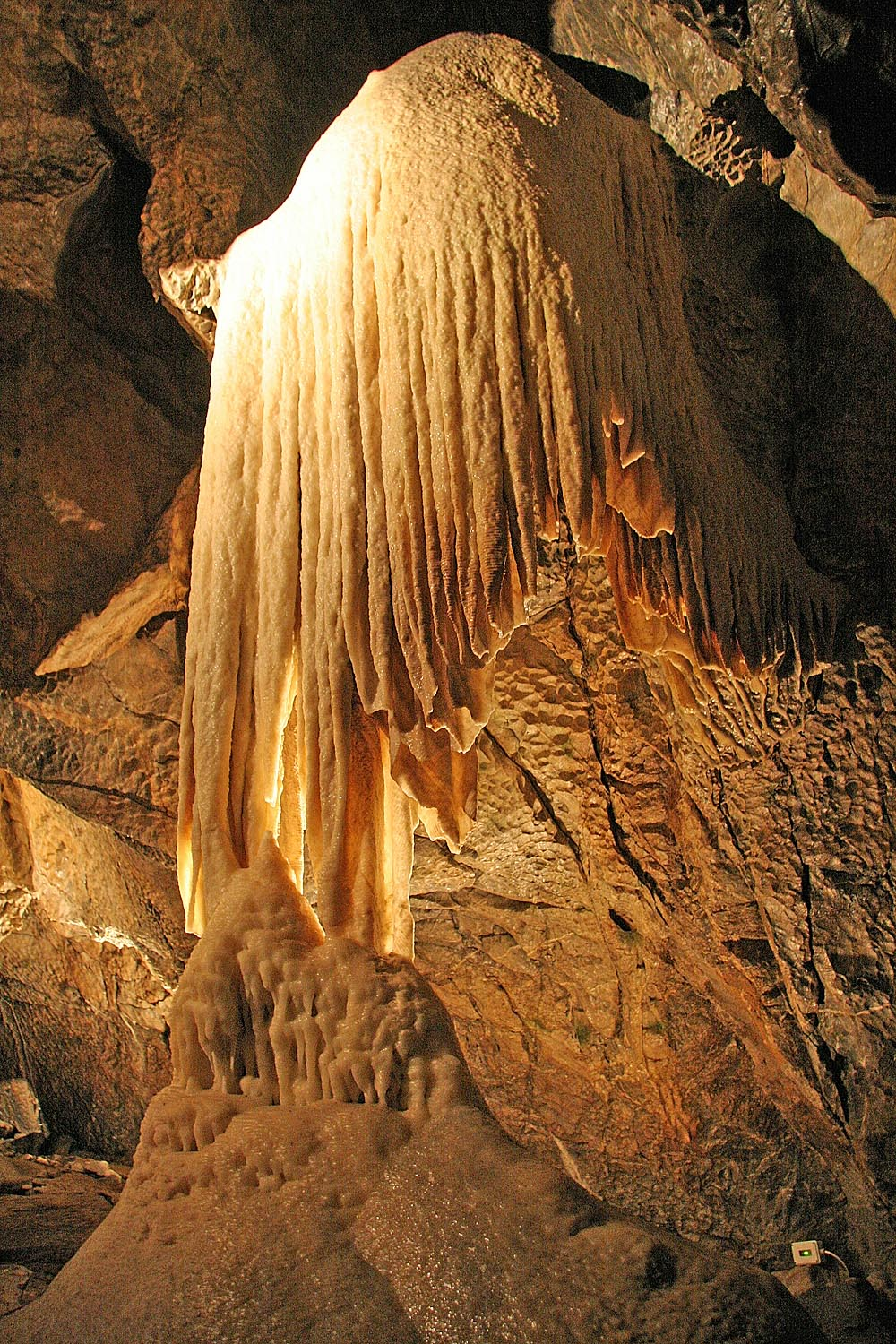

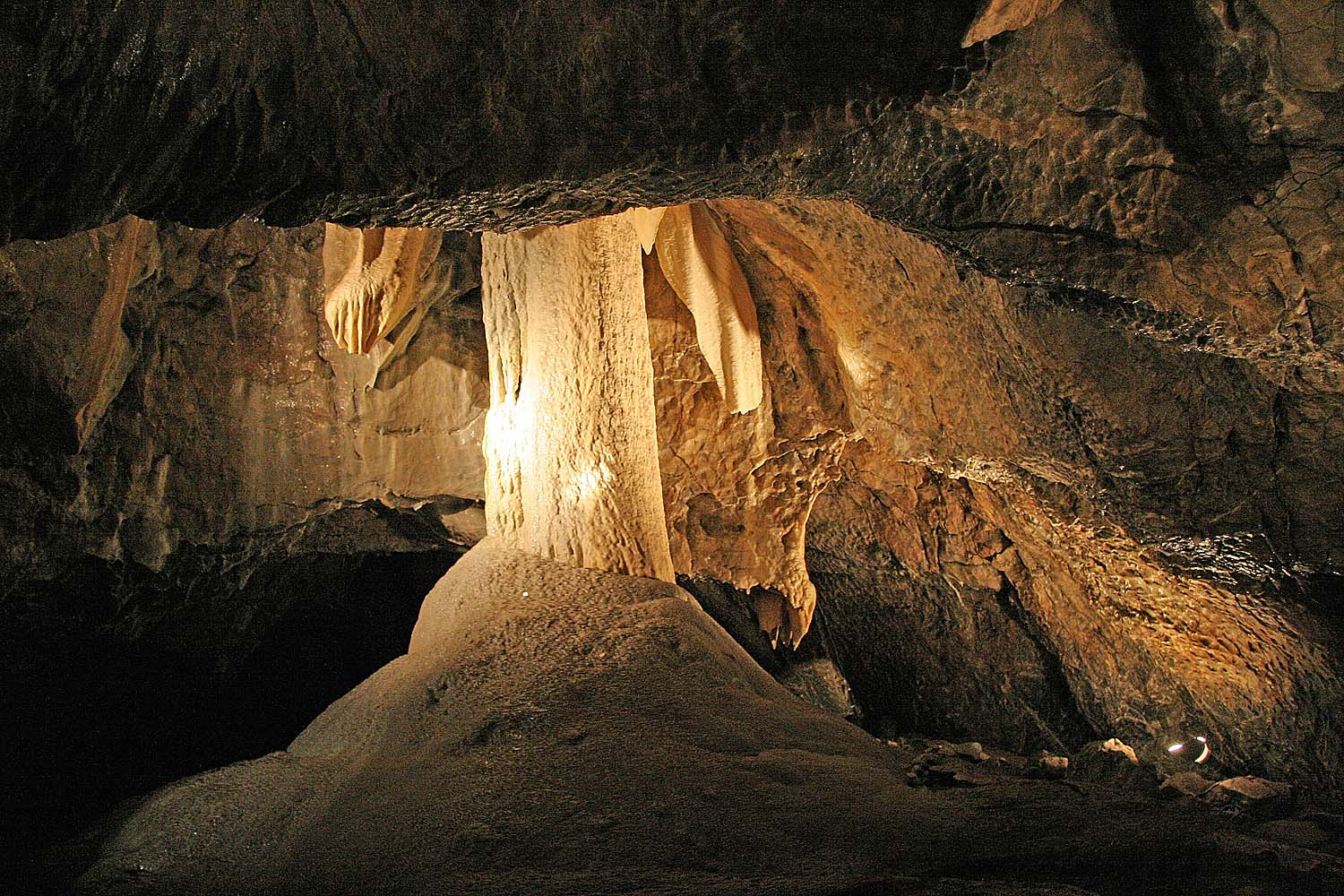

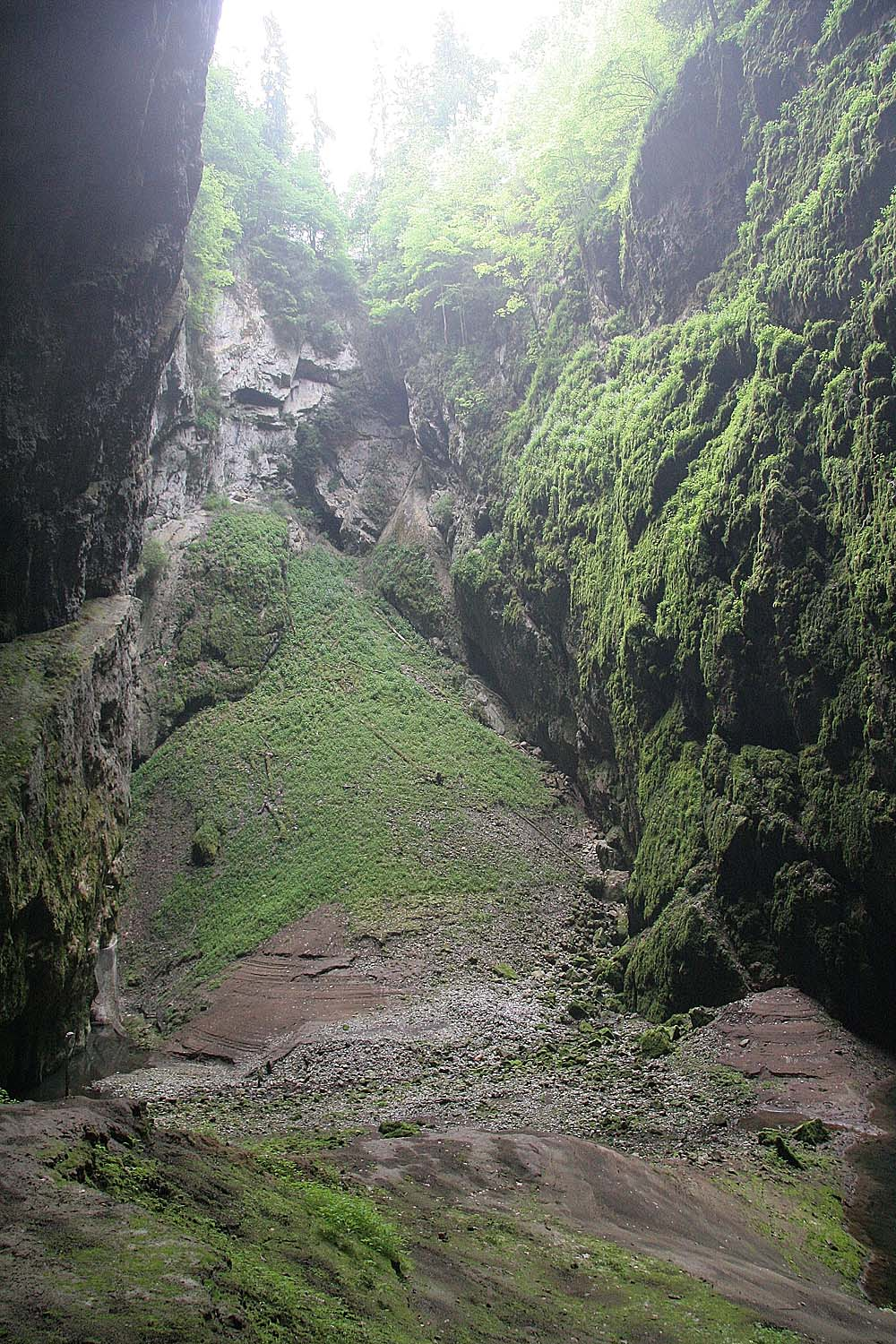
Macocha Gorge

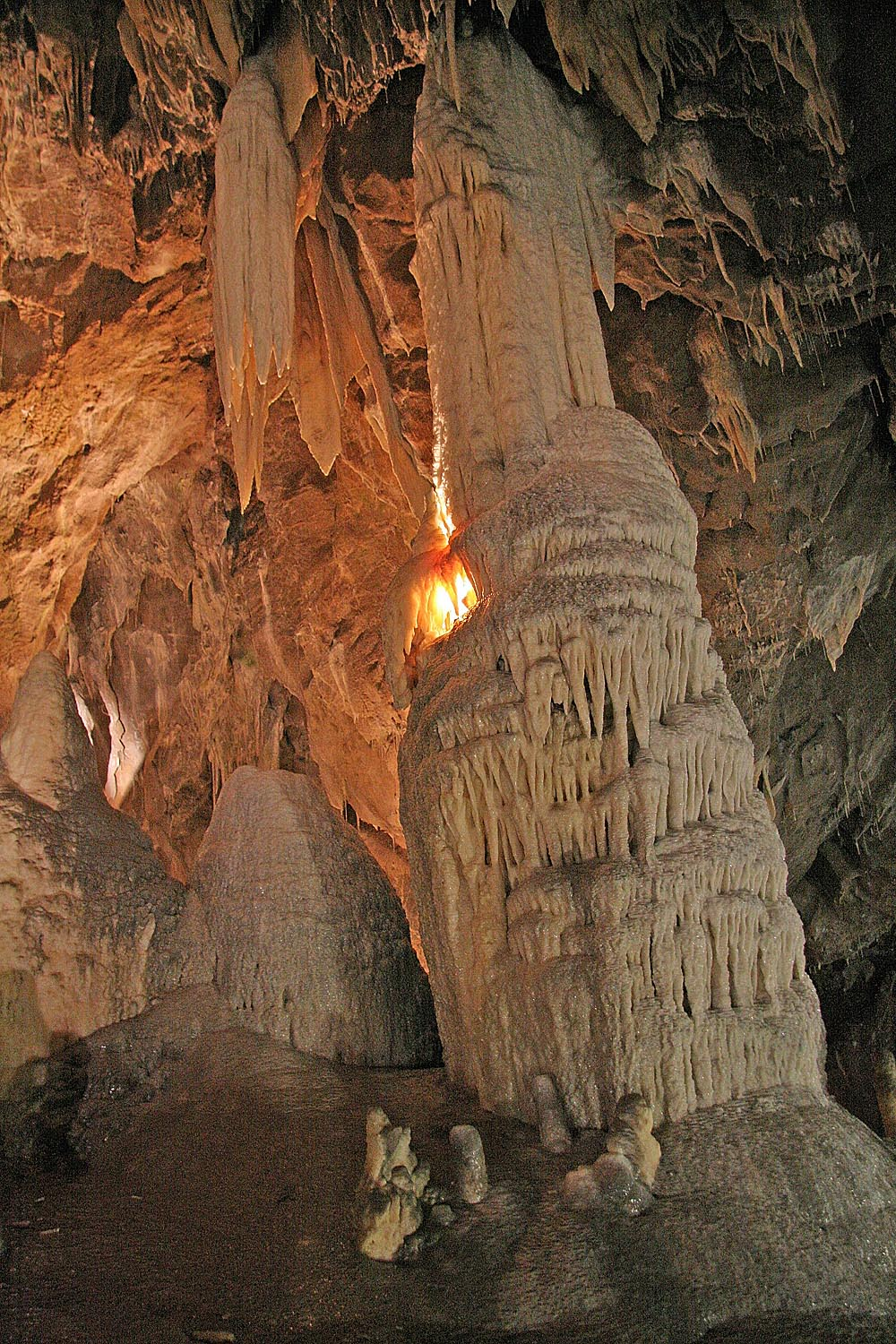
Masarykův dóm

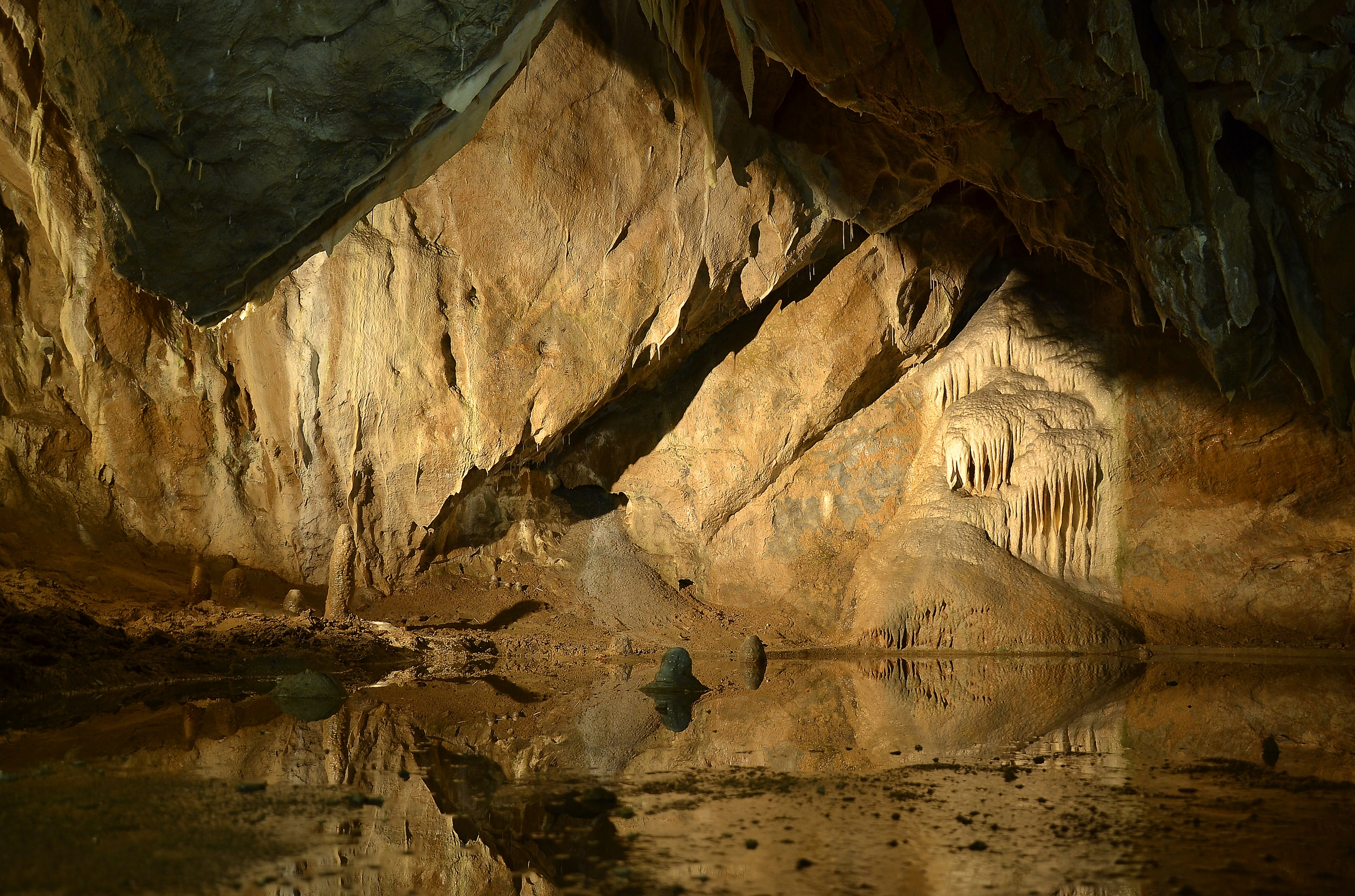
Masarykův dóm

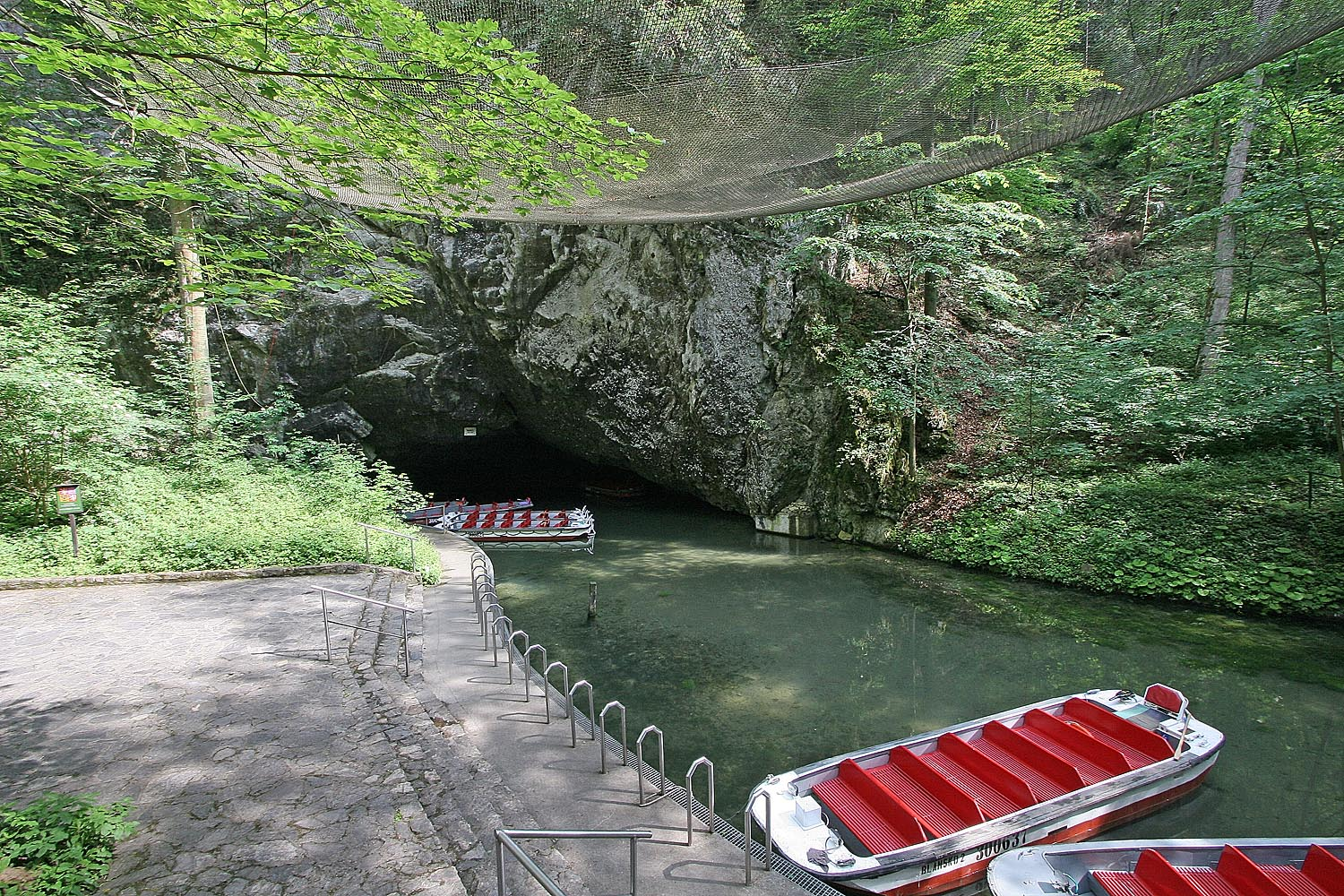
přístaviště

== See also ==
- Karst
