= South Moravian Region =

Region of the Czech Republic

Coordinates: 49°10′N 16°35′E

South Moravian Region Jihomoravský kraj
- Region
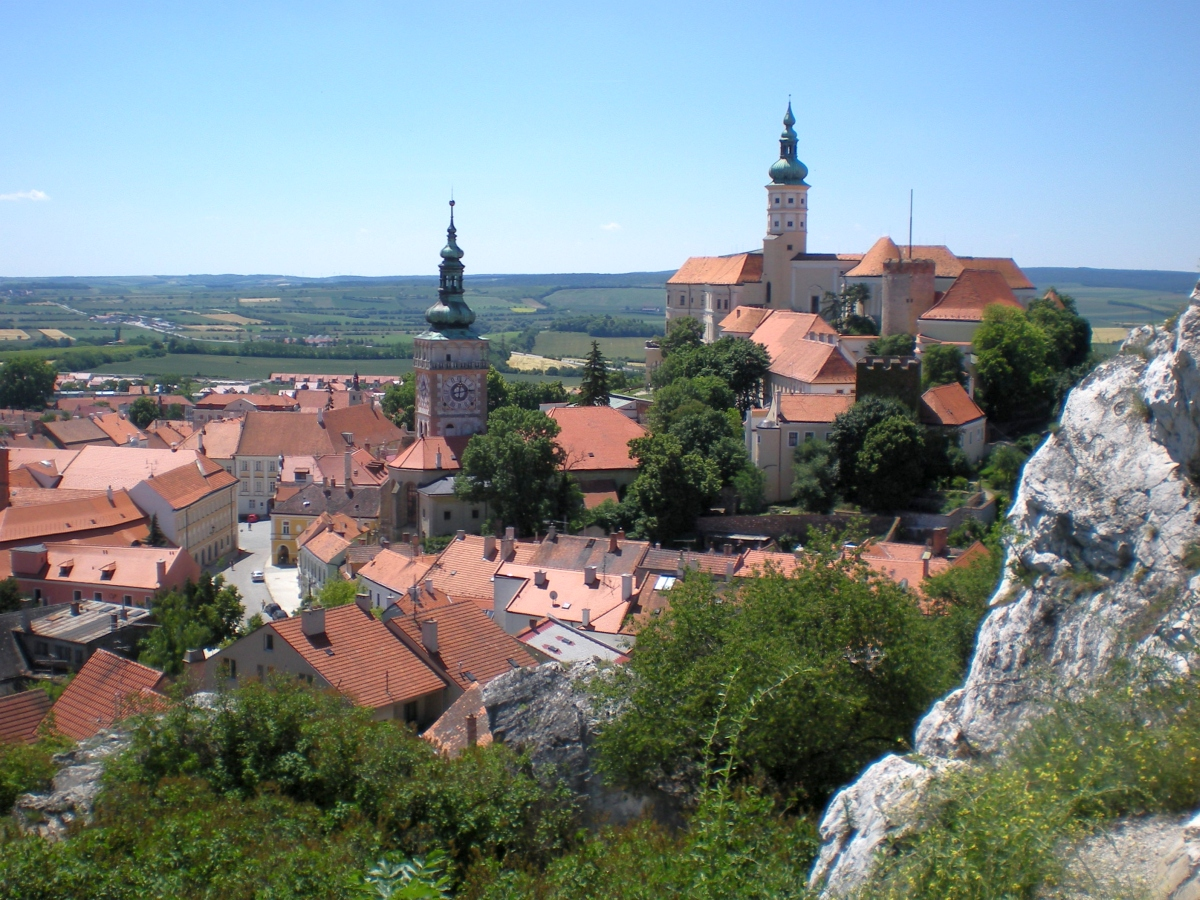

- Flag Coat of arms

- Country: Czech Republic
- Capital: Brno
- Districts: Blansko District, Břeclav District, Brno-City District, Brno-Country District, Hodonín District, Vyškov District, Znojmo District

Government
  - Governor: Jan Grolich (KDU-ČSL)

Area
  - Total: 7,187.83 km^{2} (2,775.24 sq mi)
- Highest elevation: 819 m (2,687 ft)

Population (2024-01-01)
  - Total: 1,226,749
  - Density: 170.670/km^{2} (442.034/sq mi)

GDP
  - Total: CZK 671.259 billion (€26.179 billion)
- ISO 3166 code: CZ-64
- Vehicle registration: B
- Website: www.kr-jihomoravsky.cz

The South Moravian Region (Czech: Jihomoravský kraj; German: Südmährische Region, pronounced [zyːtˈmɛːʁɪʃə ʁeˈɡi̯oːn]; Slovak: Juhomoravský kraj), or just South Moravia, is an administrative unit (kraj) of the Czech Republic, located in the southwestern part of its historical region of Moravia. The region's capital is Brno, the nation's 2nd largest city. South Moravia is bordered by the South Bohemian Region to the west, Vysočina Region to the north-west, Pardubice Region to the north, Olomouc Region to the north-east, Zlín Region to the east, Trenčín and Trnava Regions, Slovakia to the south-east and Lower Austria, Austria to the south.

== Administrative divisions ==
The South Moravian Region is divided into 7 districts (Czech: okres):

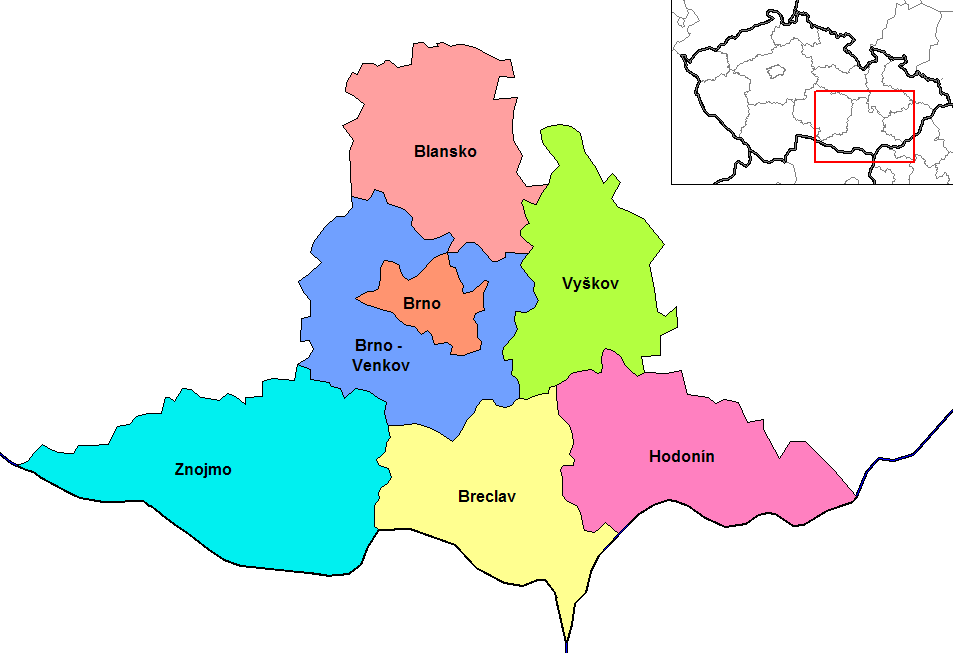
Districts of South Moravia Region

Blansko; Břeclav	Brno City; Brno-Venkov (Brno Country)	Hodonín; Vyškov	Znojmo

There are in total 673 municipalities in the region, of which 49 have the status of towns. There are 21 municipalities with extended powers and 34 municipalities with a delegated municipal office.

The region is famous for its wine production. The area around the towns of Mikulov, Znojmo, Velké Pavlovice, Bzenec, Strážnice, Kyjov along with the Slovácko region provide 94% of the Czech Republic's vineyards.

== Population ==
The region has approximately 1,217,000 inhabitants. The net migration has been positive in all years since 2003, reaching its peak in 2007 when it reached 7,374 people. Since 2007 the region has also experienced natural population growth. In 2012 there were 37 thousand foreigners living in the region, forming 3.2% of the total population of the region.

The average age of citizens in the region was 42.4 years in 2019. The average age has grown by 5 years over the last two decades. The life expectancy at birth in 2012 was 75.2 years for men and 81.7 years for women. Life expectancy has been growing over recent years. The divorce-marriage ratio in the region was 60.3 in 2012.

One third of the region's population lives in the capital Brno. The share of inhabitants living in towns and cities on the total population of the region has been steadily decreasing due to suburbanization. The table below displays 12 municipalities with the highest number of inhabitants in the region (as of 1 January 2024):

Name	Population	Area (km^{2})	District
Brno	400,566	230	Brno-City District
Znojmo	34,160	66	Znojmo District
Břeclav	24,863	77	Břeclav District
Hodonín	23,657	63	Hodonín District
Vyškov	20,498	50	Vyškov District
Blansko	20,185	45	Blansko District
Boskovice	12,190	28	Blansko District
Kuřim	11,400	17	Brno-Country District
Kyjov	10,799	30	Hodonín District
Veselí nad Moravou	10,623	35	Hodonín District
Ivančice	9,971	48	Brno-Country District
Tišnov	9,275	17	Brno-Country District

Historical population

Year	Pop.	±%
1869	668,256	—
1880	729,148	+9.1%
1890	785,303	+7.7%
1900	849,875	+8.2%
1910	936,159	+10.2%

Year	Pop.	±%
1921	970,713	+3.7%
1930	1,045,447	+7.7%
1950	977,892	−6.5%
1961	1,062,238	+8.6%
1970	1,084,485	+2.1%

Year	Pop.	±%
1980	1,141,993	+5.3%
1991	1,144,160	+0.2%
2001	1,134,780	−0.8%
2011	1,163,505	+2.5%
2021	1,197,651	+2.9%

Source: Censuses

== Geography ==
With an area of 7,187.8 km^{2} the South Moravian Region is the fourth largest region of the Czech Republic. The highest point of the region is located in the eastern part on Durda mountain (842 m). The point with the lowest elevation (150 m) is situated in Břeclav District at the meeting of the rivers Morava and Dyje.

The northern and north-western part of the region is covered by the Bohemian-Moravian Highlands (Czech: Českomoravská vrchovina) and the Moravian Karst. There is an extensive cave complex in the Moravian Karst with a 138.5 m depth in the Macocha Gorge in the Punkva Caves. In the eastern part, the region reaches to the Carpathian Mountains. The Bohemian-Moravian Highlands and the Carpathian Mountains are separated by the Lower-Moravian Valley (Czech: Dolnomoravský úval). The southern part of the region is predominantly flat and dominated by fields, meadows, and the remainders of riparian forests.

The largest river of the region is the Morava river. Other significant rivers are the Dyje, Svratka (and its tributary the Svitava), which are all tributaries of the Morava river. The whole region belongs to the drainage basin of the Danube and subsequently of the Black Sea.

There are a number of landscape parks (Czech: chráněná krajinná oblast) located across the region: the White Carpathians Landscape Park, the Moravian Karst Landscape Park and Pálava Landscape Park. Moreover, Podyjí National Park is situated in the south-eastern part of the region.

== Major events ==
=== 2021 tornado ===
On the evening of 24 June 2021, a large IF4 tornado, the most powerful in modern Czech history, devastated multiple villages within the Břeclav and Hodonín districts. It killed at least 6 people and injured at least 200 others. The tornado tracked 27.1 kilometers (16.8 miles) with a max width of 2.8 kilometers (1.7 miles) This tornado was one of seven that touched down in Europe that day. It is estimated that this tornado caused over 15 billion CZK in damages. A total of 1,202 buildings were damaged by the tornado, 180 of which had to be demolished completely or partially. Well constructed homes were partly or entirely destroyed, including one that indicated IF5 intensity. However, a rather weak connection between the roof and the walls was found, which prevented the damage to be assigned an IF5 rating. Cars were mangled distances and into buildings. A car was thrown 200 meters into a field, with the engine found 150 meters away. Trucks, trailers, busses and other large vehicles were overturned or tossed. pylon of 400 kV power lines were toppled. Trees were uprooted, snapped, debranched and debarked. A factory in Lužice was heavily damaged with multiple vehicles mangled into the building. Some trees at the factory sustained severe denuding. Empty large containers were thrown and a solar farm was severely damaged. In Hodonín, a large and multi-story building found at the northern edge of the town had Its roof and interior significantly damaged. Wooden and steel beams from the roof were found impaled into the ground around the buildings and bent by the wind. Large concrete floor tiles were plucked out of the ground and thrown away. In Mikulčice, A bus with several passengers inside was thrown over a small hill, impacting a one-storey brick home. large concrete panels measuring 3 x 1 x 0.1 m were moved several meters. In Hrušky, a caravan weighing 7 tonnes was tossed 20 meters away, flying over a garage. Several heavy trailers and tractors as well as large concrete blocks from a hay storing structure were lifted and thrown by the tornado.

== Living conditions ==
In 2016, three-quarters of households in the region had a computer and 75% of the households had Internet connection. There were in total 781 thousand motor vehicles, of which 482 thousand were cars and 110 thousand were motorbikes.

The unemployment rate in the region was 4.3% as of October 2017.

== Economy ==
The nominal gross domestic product of the South Moravian Region was 671.259 billion CZK in 2021, which is nearly 11% of the national GDP. Among other regions, South Moravian Region had the third largest share on the national GDP out of fourteen. The GDP per capita was 562.278 CZK (23.428 EUR) in the same period, which is 98.5% of the national average and the second highest result after region Prague.

- Industry

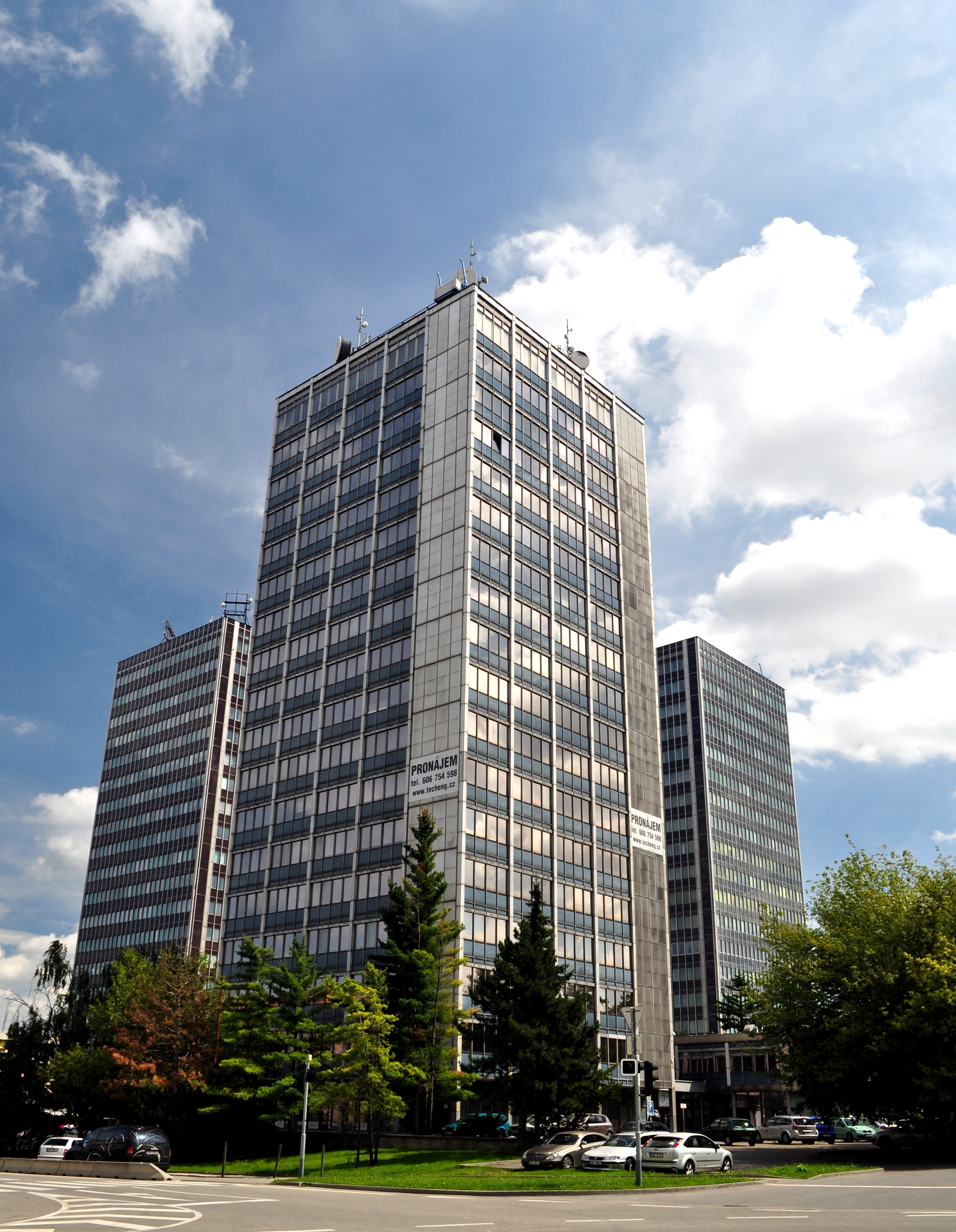
Office towers in Brno

Mechanical engineering has an essential role in the economy of the region. Important centers of mechanical engineering are Brno (PBS, Siemens, Zetor Brno), Blansko (ČKD Blansko, Metra Blansko), Kuřim (TOS Kuřim), Boskovice (Minerva, Novibra) and Břeclav (OTIS). Electrical engineering has a tradition for more than a century. Significant producers are Siemens Drásov, VUES Brno and ZPA Brno. Food industry forms another important sector, especially in the southern and eastern part of the region. Important activities are the meat processing, canning of fruits and vegetables (Znojmia, Fruta), sugar industry, brewing (Starobrno, Černá Hora, Vyškov and Hostan) and winemaking (Lahofer, Znovín Znojmo, Vinium Velké Pavlovice). Chemical and pharmaceutical industry is concentrated especially in Brno (Pliva-Lachema), Ivanovice na Hané (Bioveta) and Veverská Bítýška (Hartmann Rico).

- Transport

The South-Moravian Region has an important role in the nation and international transit. It is served by a network of motorways and roads of almost 4,500 km. The motorways D1 and D2 and the expressways R43 and R52 form the skeleton of the road network in the region. Brno is an important crossing of road and railway transport and a hub of the integrated regional public transport system.

Brno has an international airport Brno–Tuřany. The airport was opened in 1954 and in 2012 it served 535 thousand passengers.

- Agriculture

The agricultural land covers 426 thousand ha, which is 59.3% of all land in the regions. The arable land occupies 49% of the total area. Znojmo District and Vyškov District have the highest proportion of arable land in the region. The agricultural production is oriented on the production of cereals, rapeseed and sugar beet. Other important agricultural sectors in the region are viticulture, fruit farming and vegetable growing. The viticulture is especially developed in Břeclav District, which has 46% of the total area of Czech vineyards.

== Science and education ==
There are several public and state universities in Brno - Janáček Academy of Performing Arts, Masaryk University, Mendel University in Brno, University of Defense, University of Veterinary Sciences Brno and Brno University of Technology. The South Moravian Region spent 856 million euros, 3.2% of its GDP on science and research in 2022, the highest share of the Czech Republic. The city of Brno in particular stands out for its support of science and research, especially in the field of IT.

== Places of interest ==
- Brno with Cathedral of St. Peter and Paul, Villa Tugendhat, Capuchin Crypt, etc.
- Dolní Věstonice archaeological site
- Lednice-Valtice - inscribed in UNESCO World Heritage List
- Macocha Gorge
- Automobile and motorbike races at Masaryk Circuit
- Podyjí National Park
- Slavkov u Brna – a town known for the Battle of Austerlitz
- Vranov nad Dyjí and its castle
- White Carpathians biosphere reservation

== Gallery ==
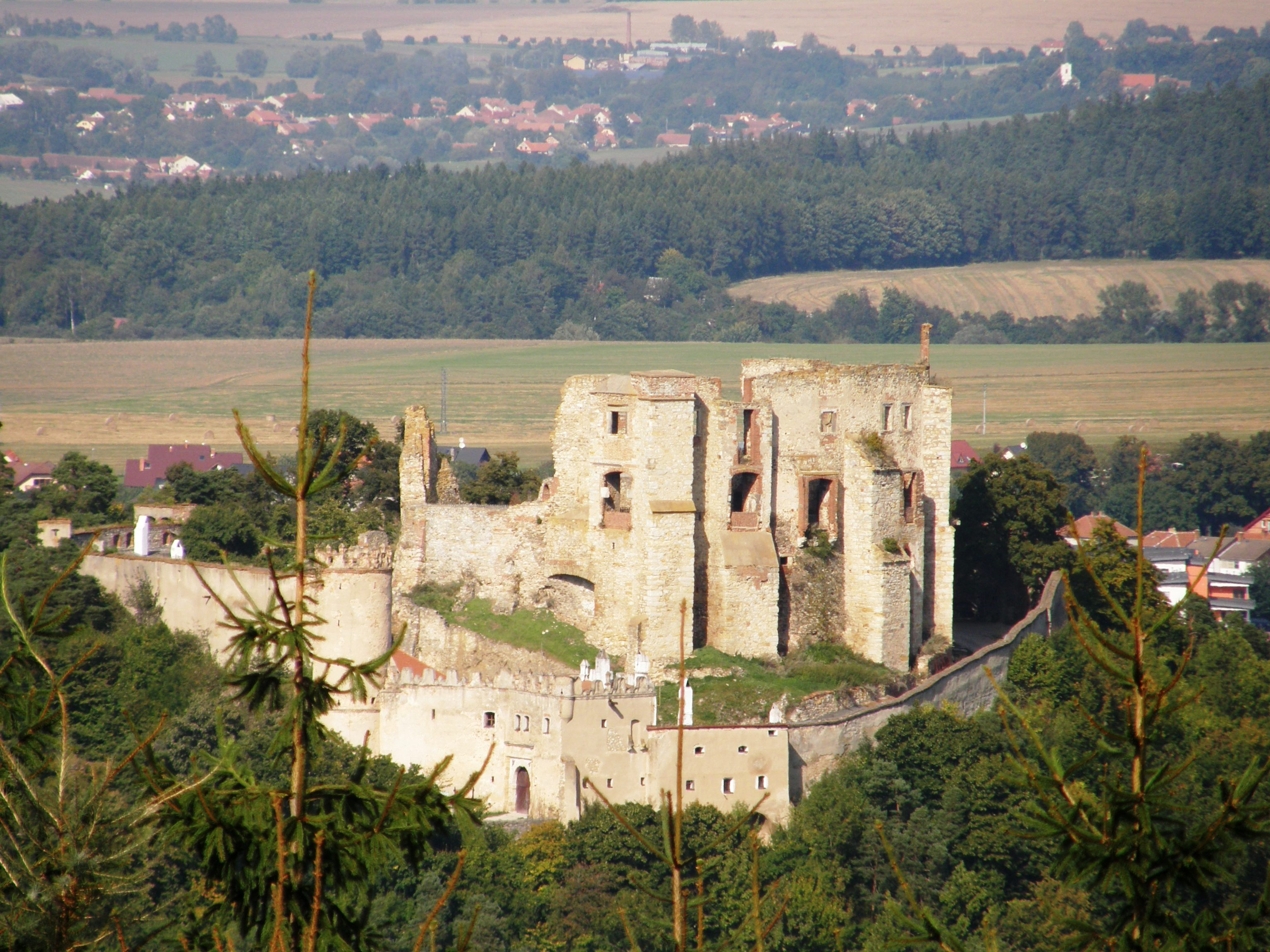
Boskovice castle

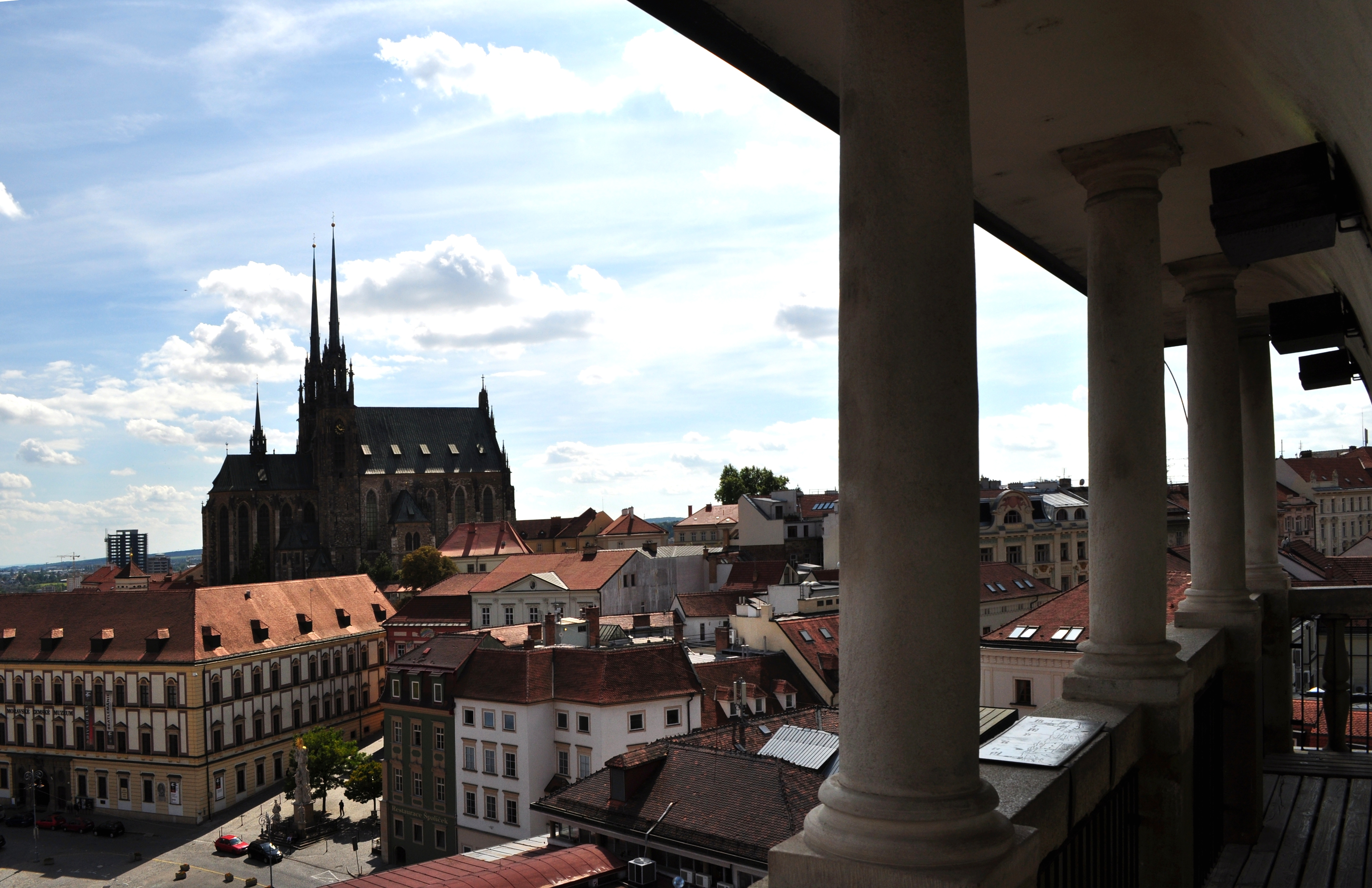
Brno

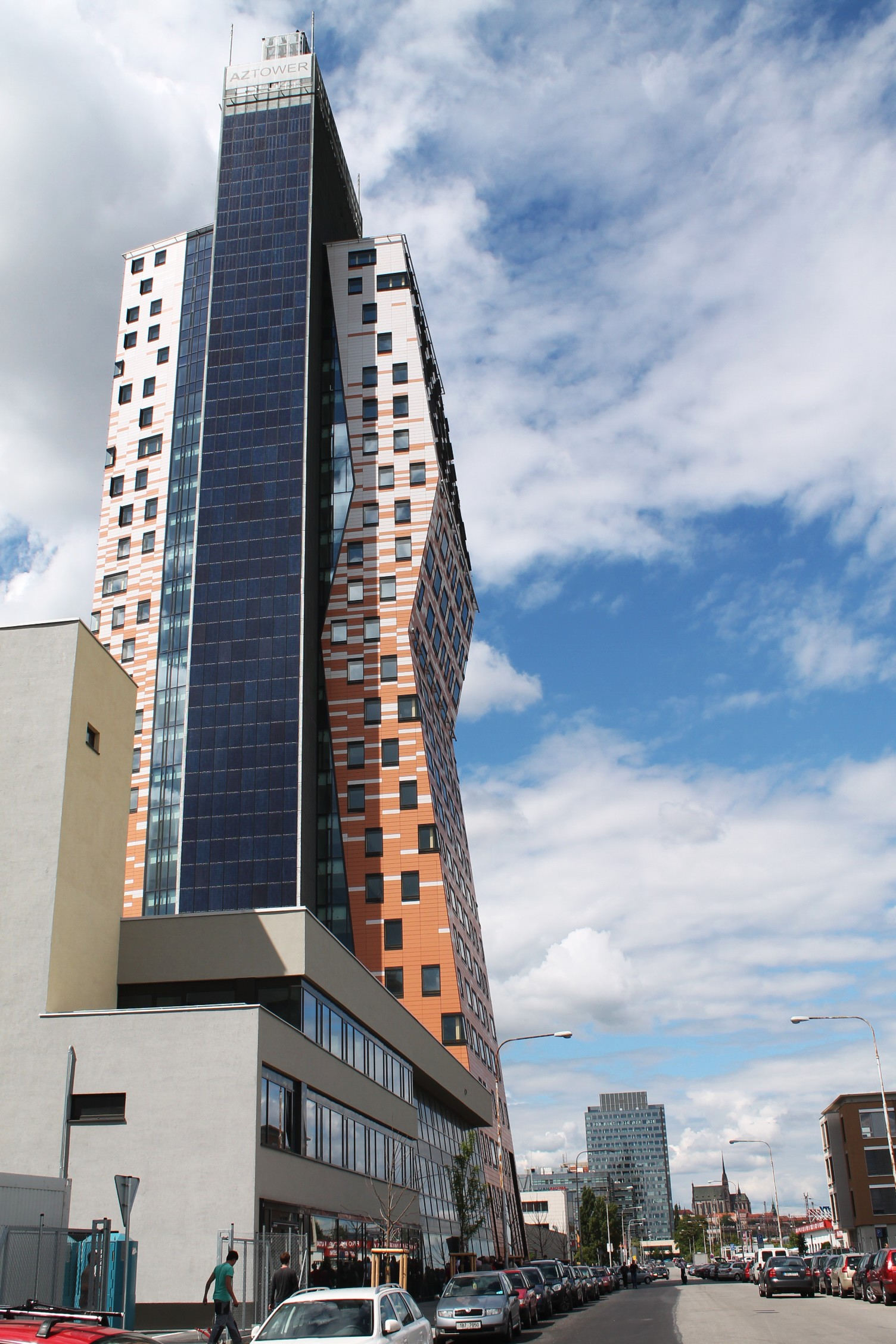
Brno

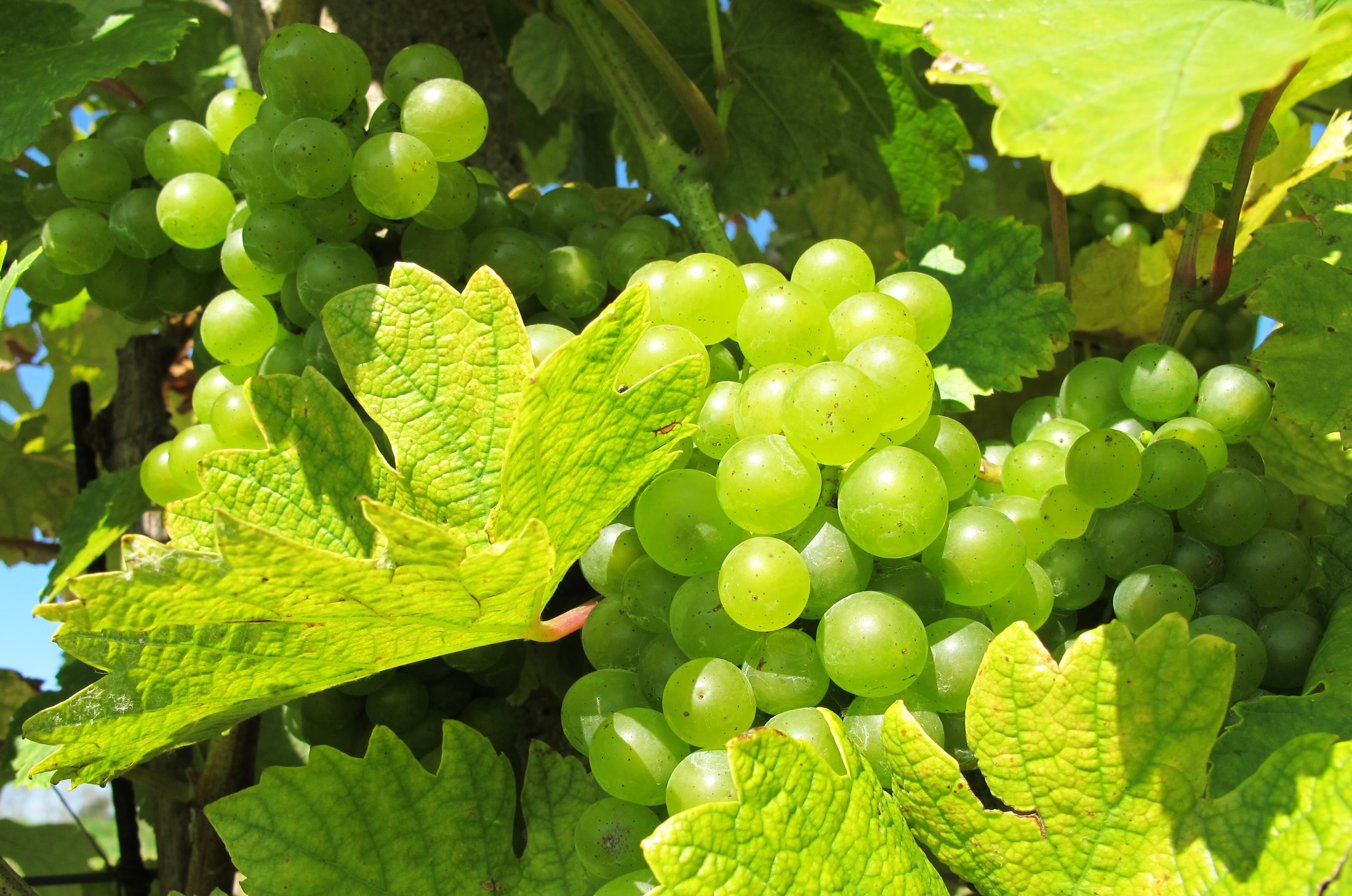
Grapes in Pálava region

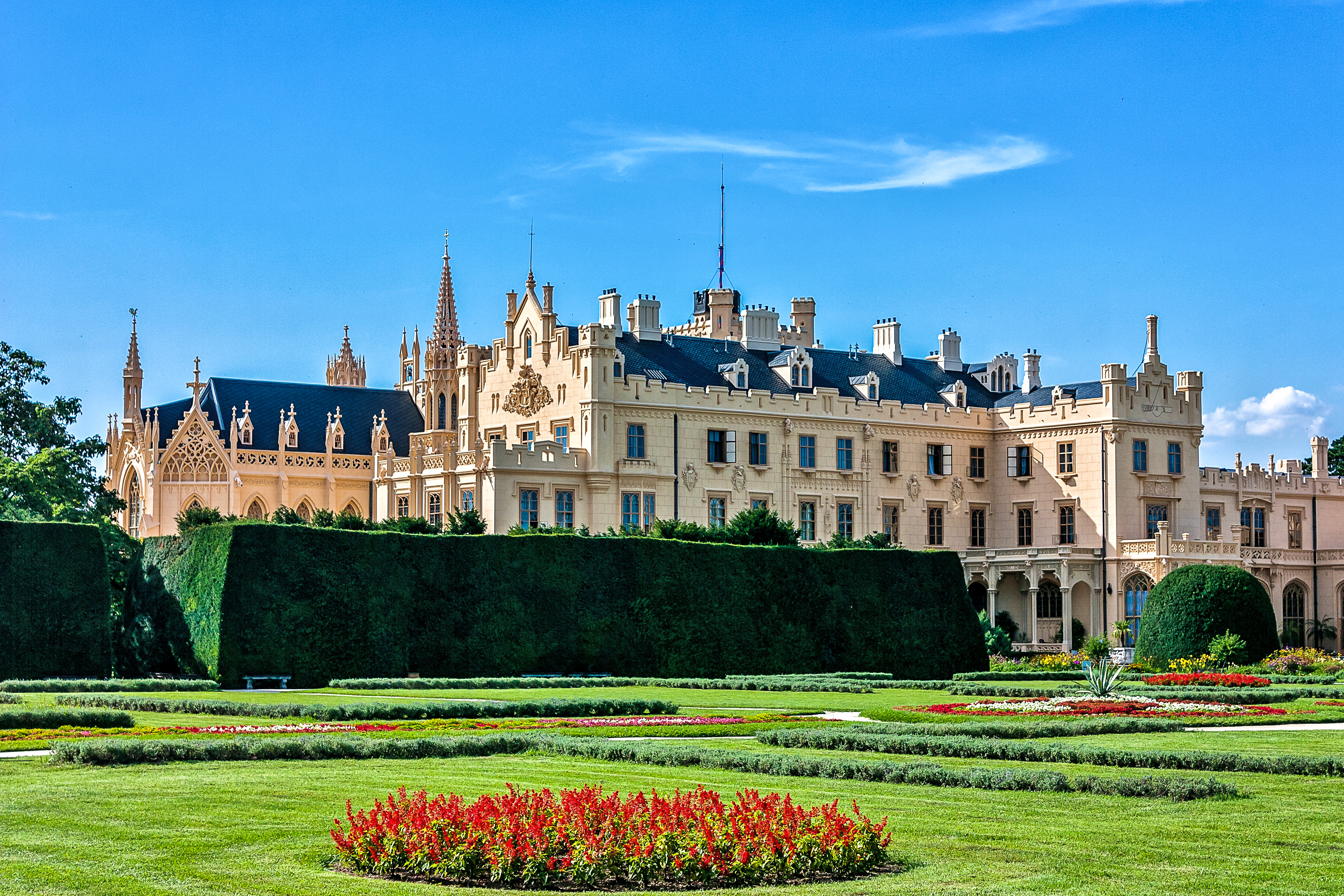
Lednice Château

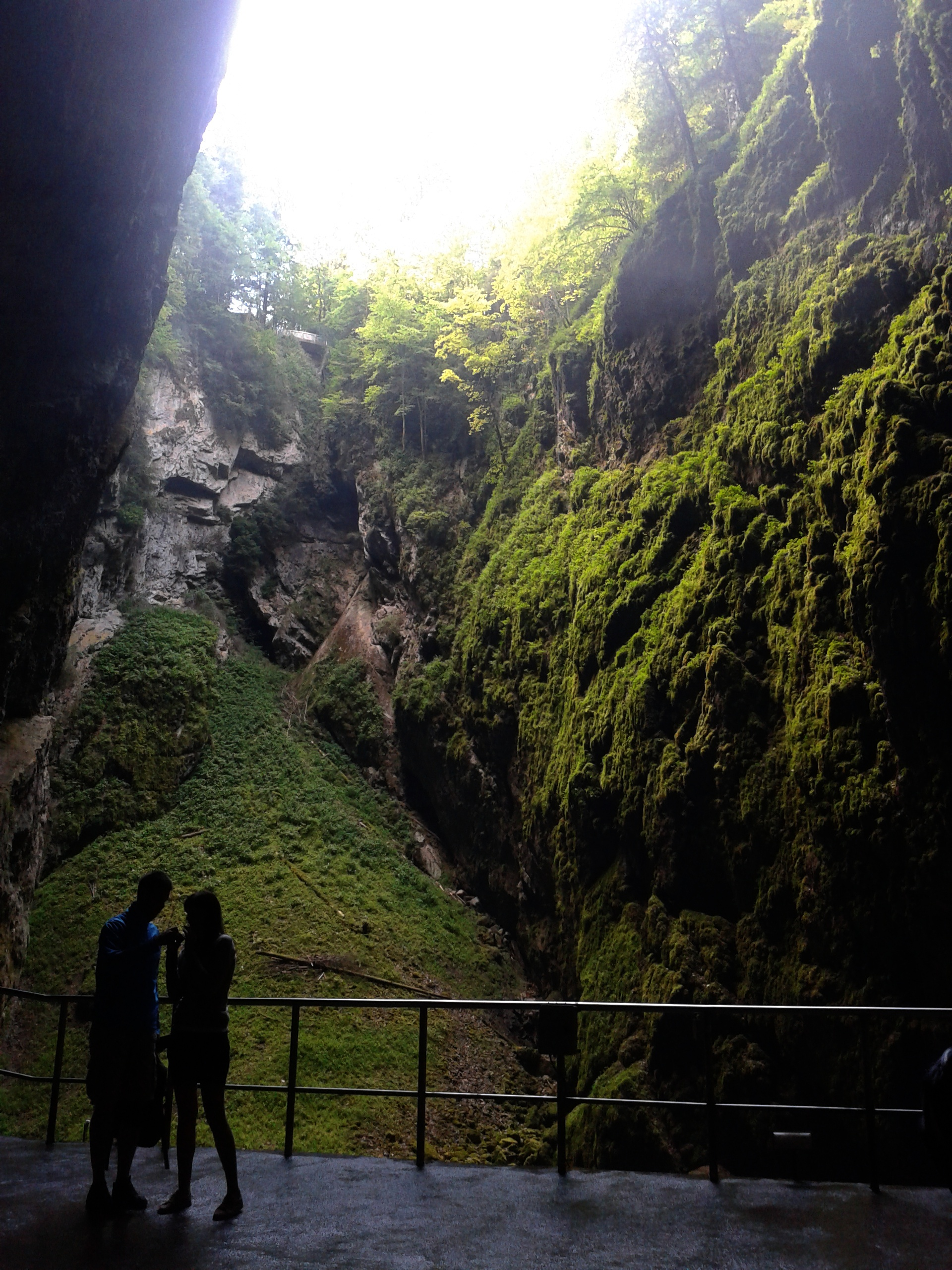
Macocha Gorge

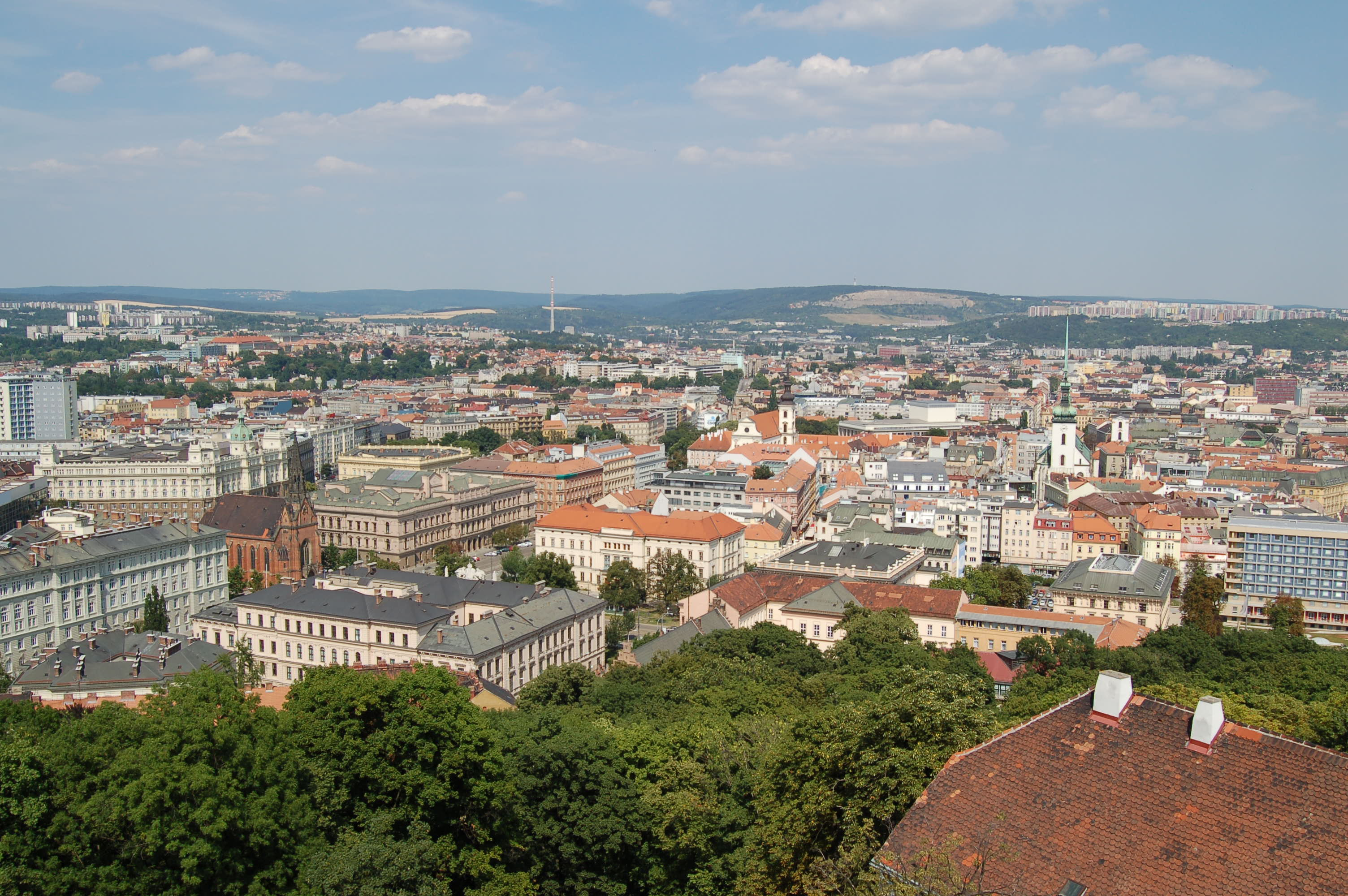
Brno

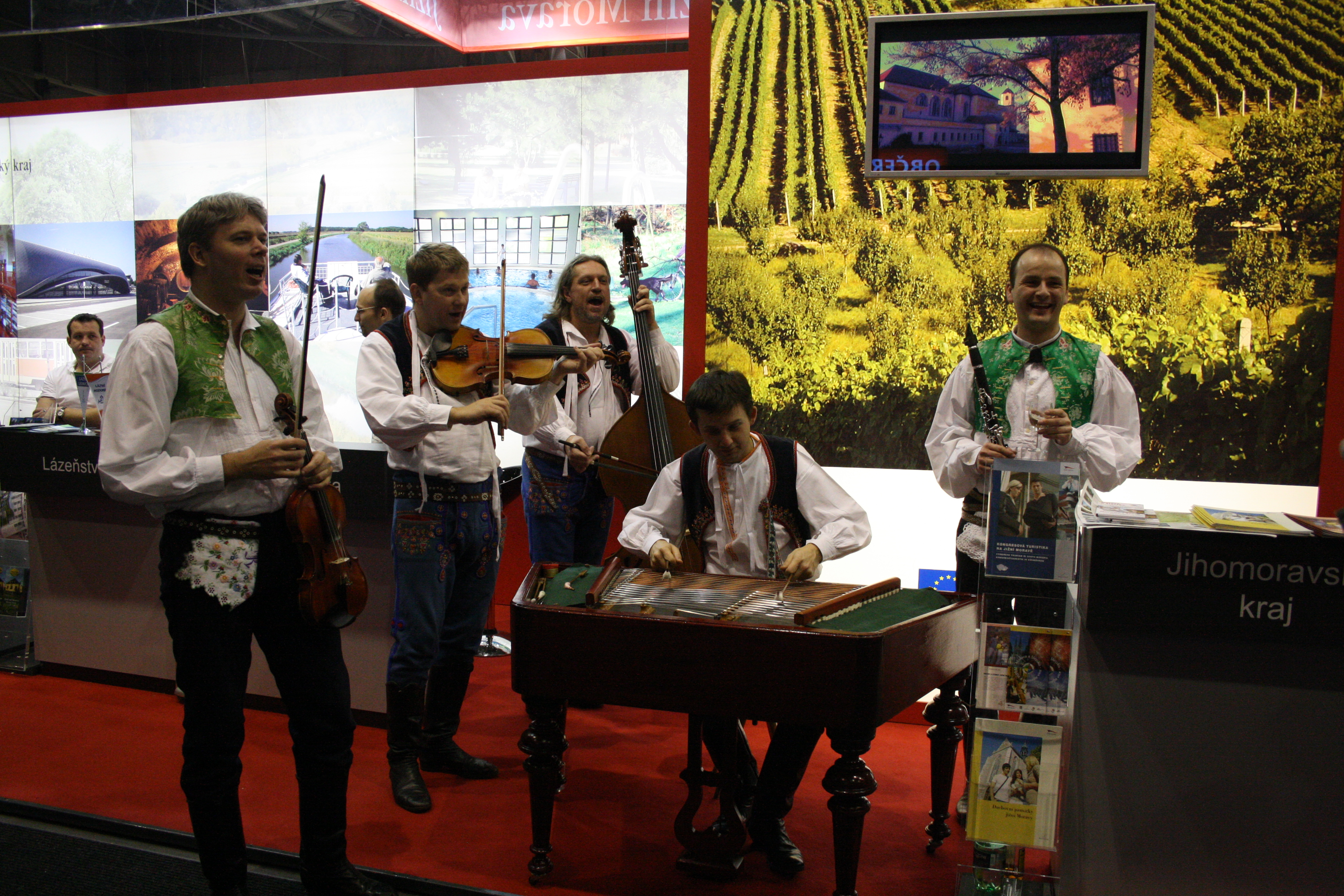
Traditional Moravian band

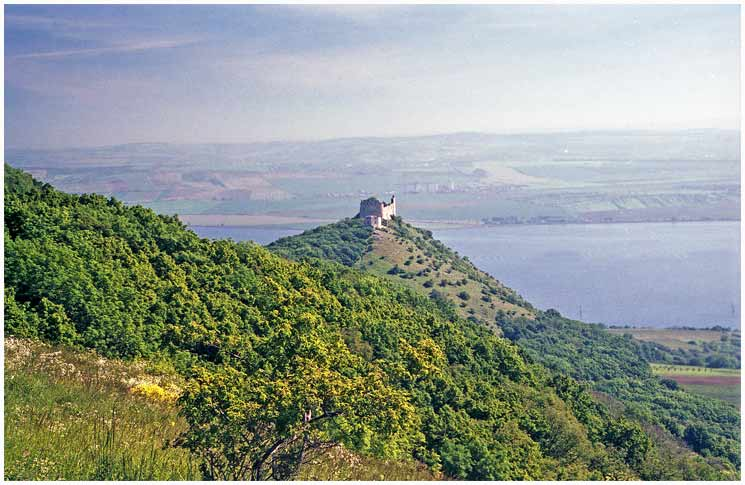
Pálava Landscape Park

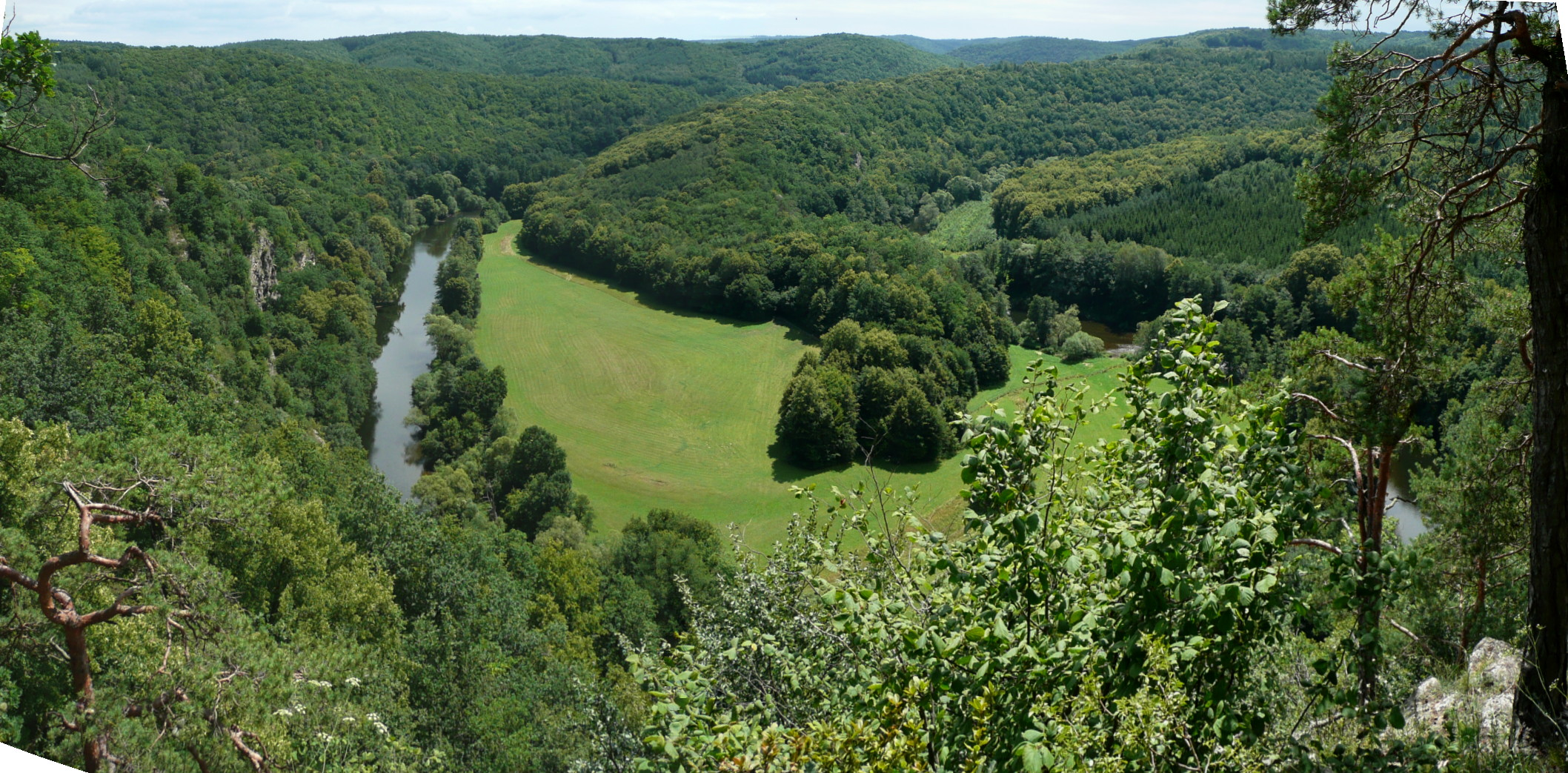
Podyjí National Park

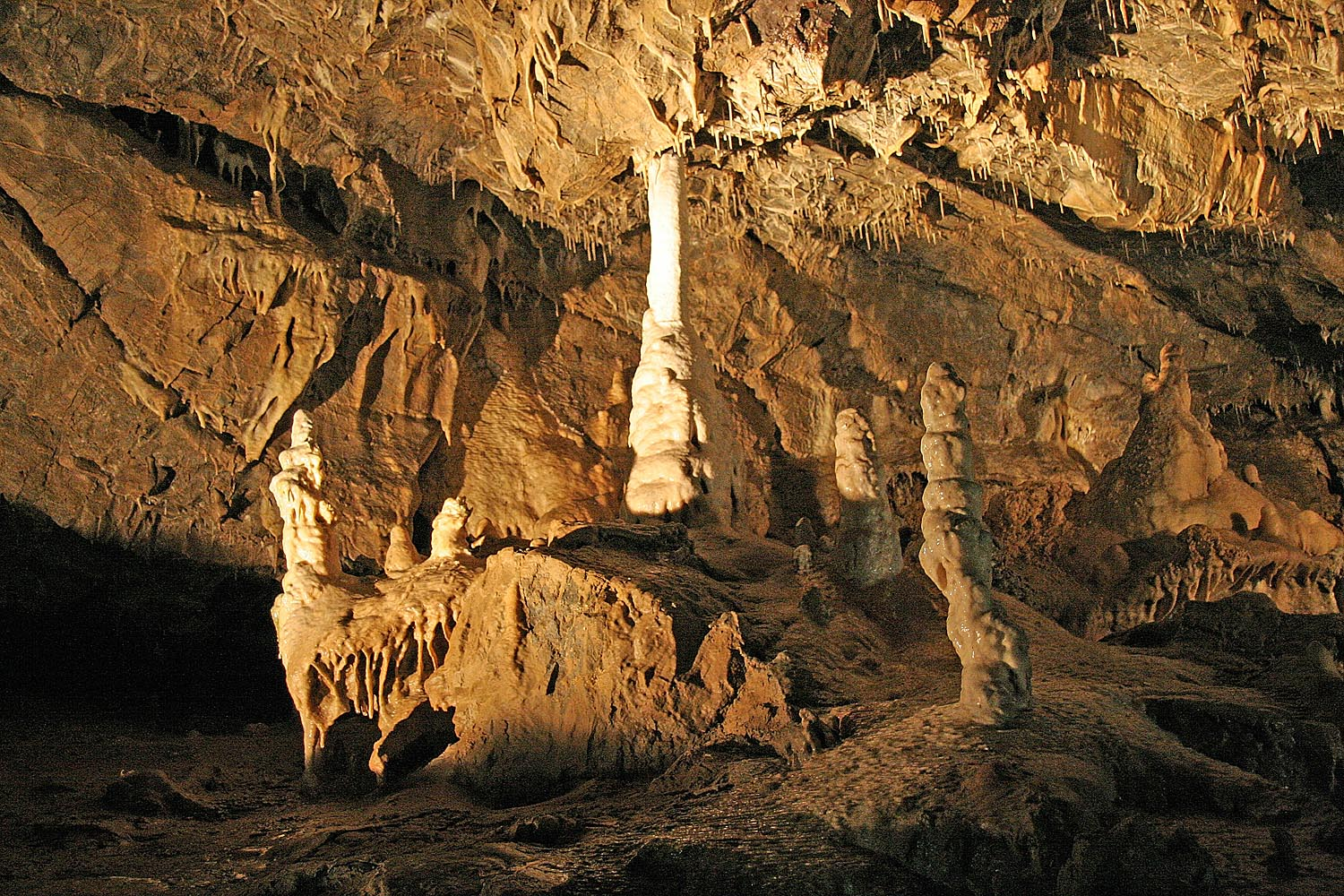
Punkva Caves in Moravian Karst

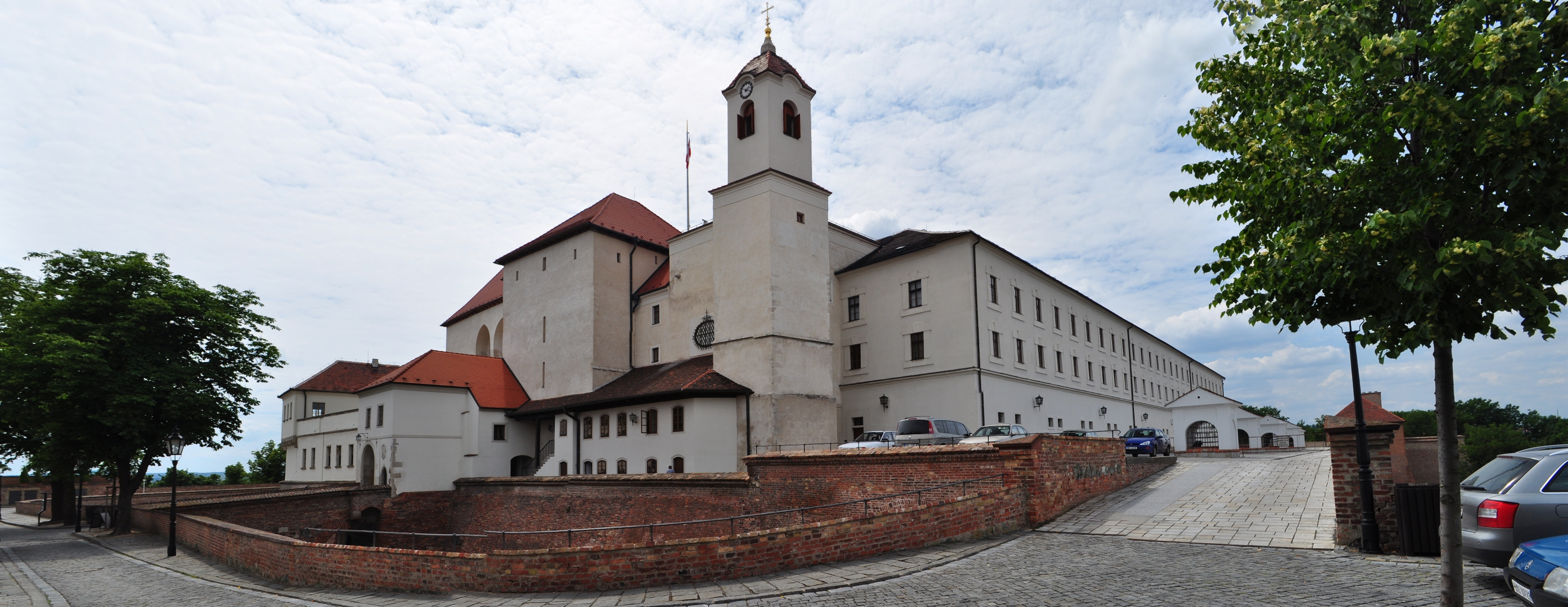
Špilberk Castle in Brno

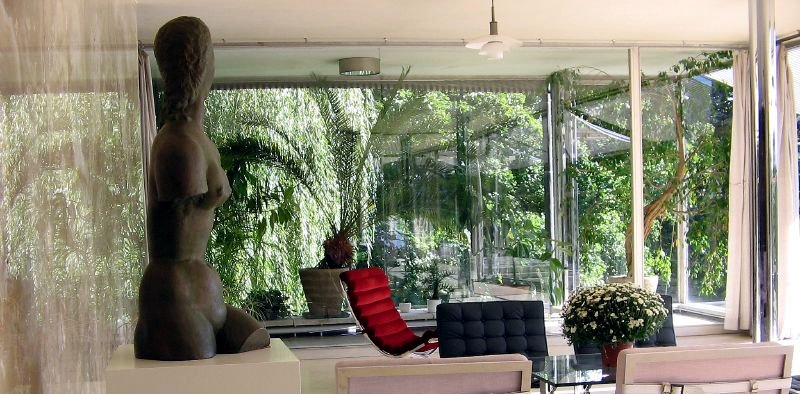
Villa Tugendhat in Brno

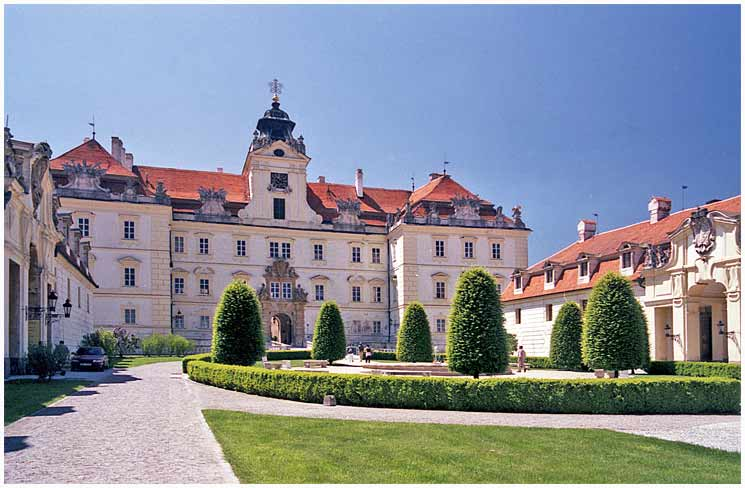
Valtice Castle

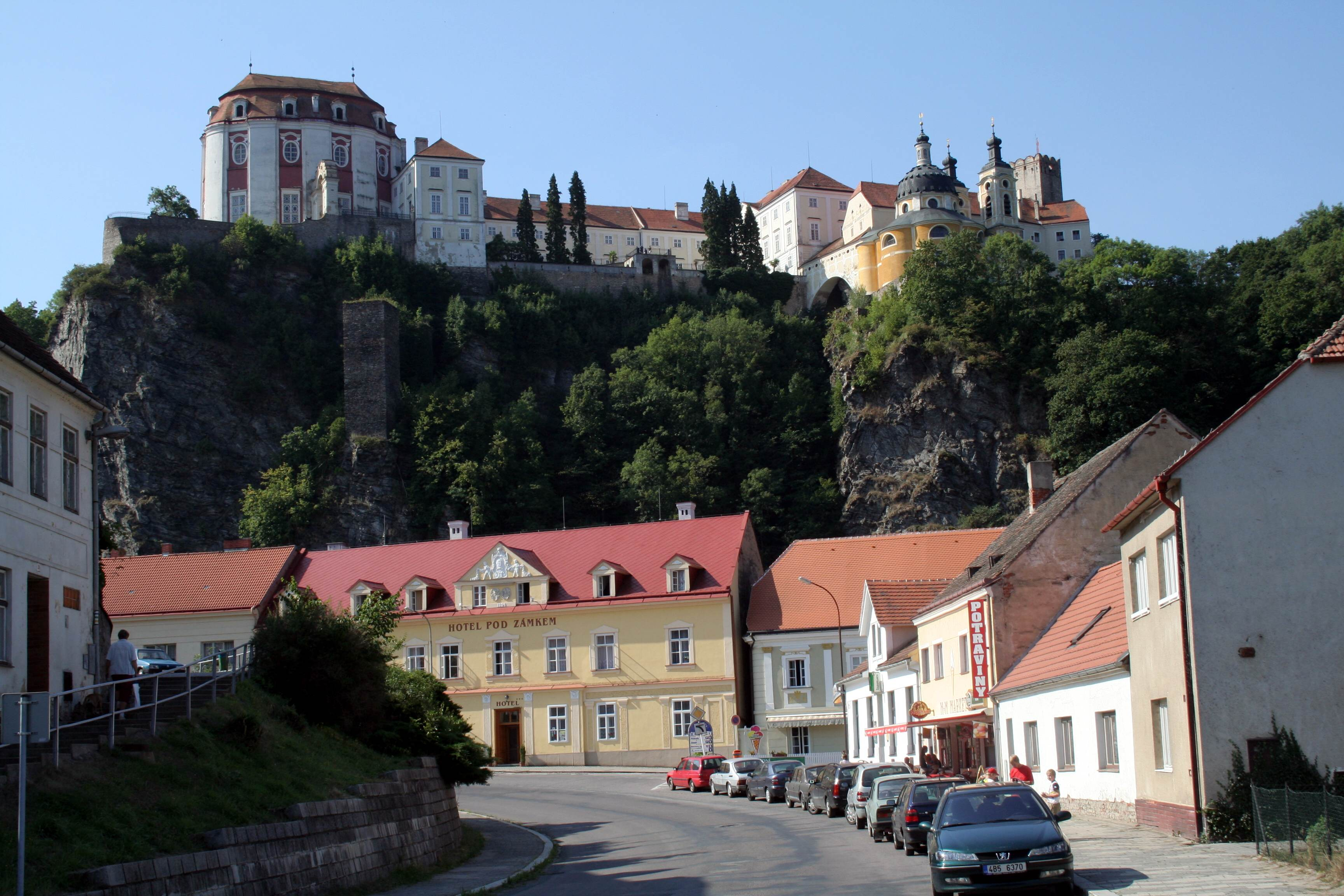
Vranov nad Dyjí

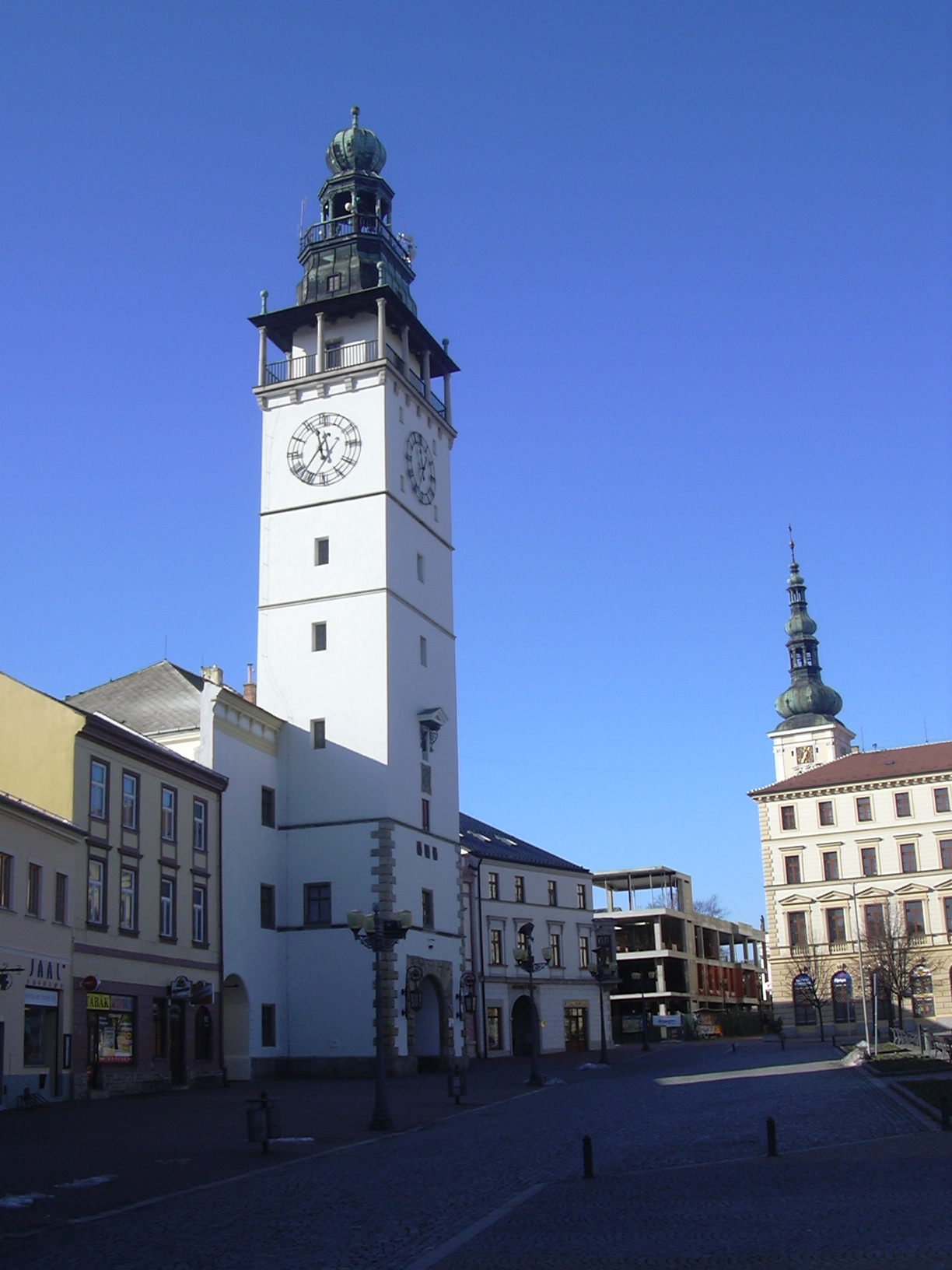
Vyškov

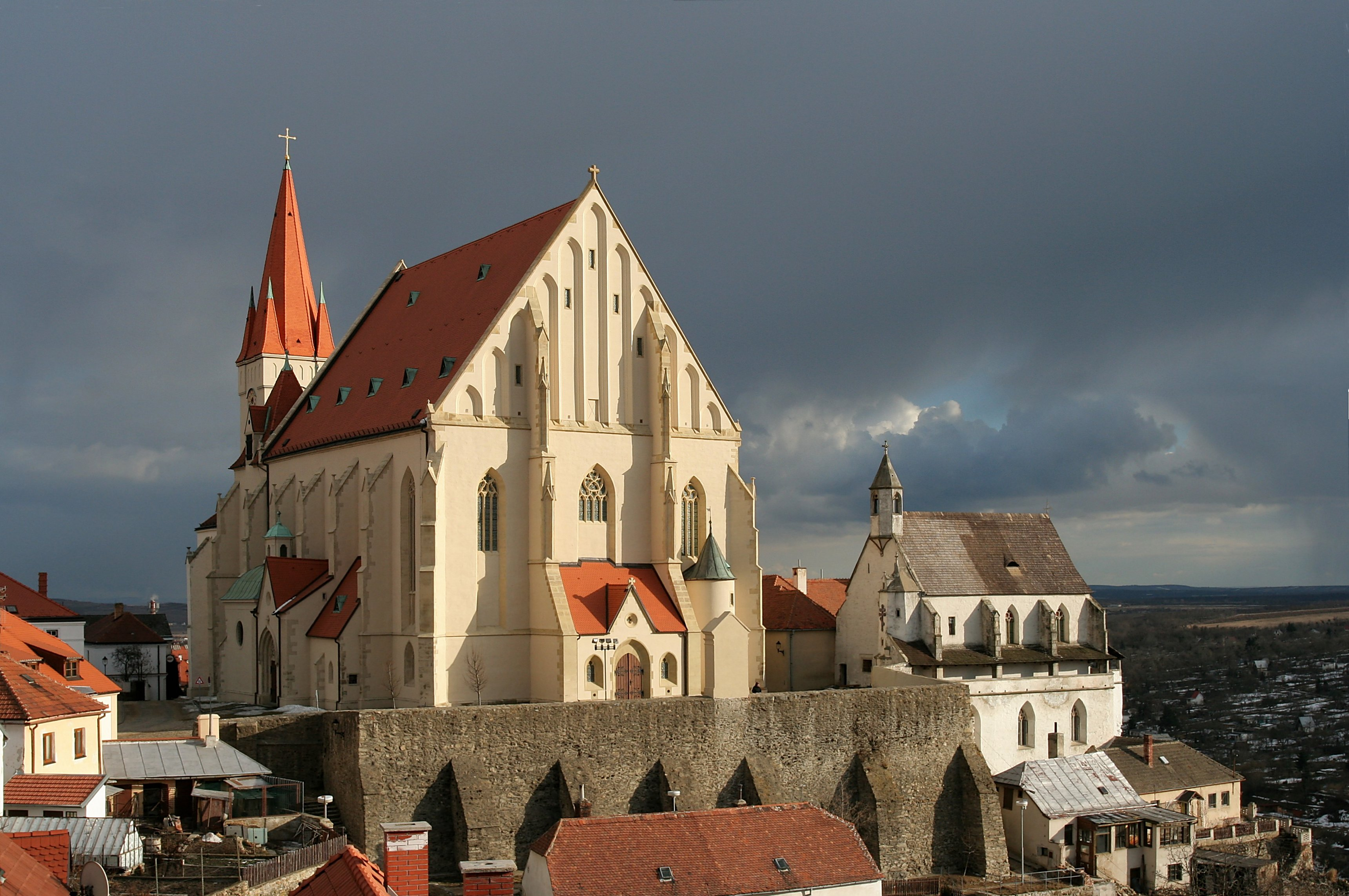
Znojmo

== See also ==
- Moravian wine
