= Lucie Bakešová =

Czech folklorist and social activist (1853–1935)

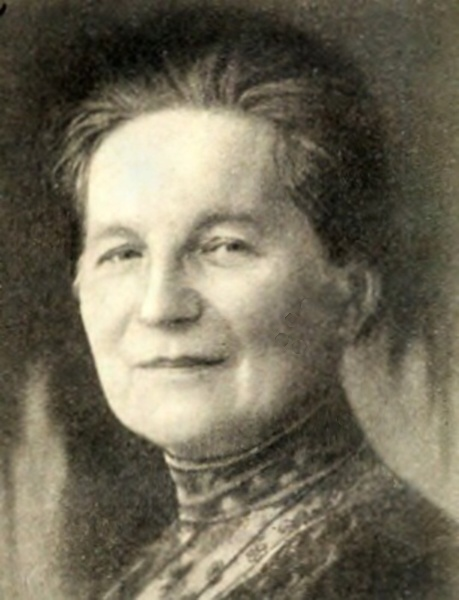
- Bakešová in 1920
- Born: 26 December 1853; Blansko, Moravia, Austrian Empire
- Died: 2 April 1935 (aged 81)
- Occupations: Ethnographer, folklore collector and social activist
- Spouse: František Xaver Bakeš (m. 1870, d. 1917)
- Parents: Jindřich Wankel (father); Eliška Wanklová (mother)
- Relatives: Karla Absolonová-Bufková (sister); Madlena Wanklová (sister); Vlasta Havelková (sister); Karel Absolon (nephew); Vladimír Jindřich Bufka (nephew)

Lucie Bakešová (née Wankelová; 26 December 1853 – 2 April 1935) was a Czech ethnographer, folklore collector and social activist.

== Life and family ==
Bakešová was born on 26 December 1853 in Blansko, Moravia, Austrian Empire (now in the Czech Republic). She was the eldest of four daughters born to Jindřich Wankel, a palaeontologist and archaeologist known as the "father of Moravian archaeology", and his wife Eliška Wanklová (née Šímová), an ethnographer and national revivalist. Her sisters were Karla Absolonová-Bufková, writer and folklorist; Madlena Wanklová, and Vlasta Havelková, collector of folk embroidery and the custodian of the Náprstek Museum in Prague.

As a child, Bakešová took piano lessons from the Czech composer Bedřich Smetana.

On 17 August 1870, Bakešová married František Xaver Bakeš, a landowner and member of the Moravian Diet (Czech: Moravský zemský sněm). She lived with her husband in the village of Ořechovičky near Brno and they had a son together, Jaroslav Bakeš, who became a doctor. The marriage was thought to have been unhappy, so Bakešová threw herself into folklore collecting work. Her husband died in 1917.

Bakešová died on 2 April 1935 in Brno, aged 81.

== Career in ethnography ==
Inspired by the collection František Sušil, Bakešová began recording local folk dances and customs. Between 1891 and 1893, she collaborated with Leoš Janáček, Františka Xavera Běhálková and Martin Zeman on the collection and publication of three books about folk dancing.

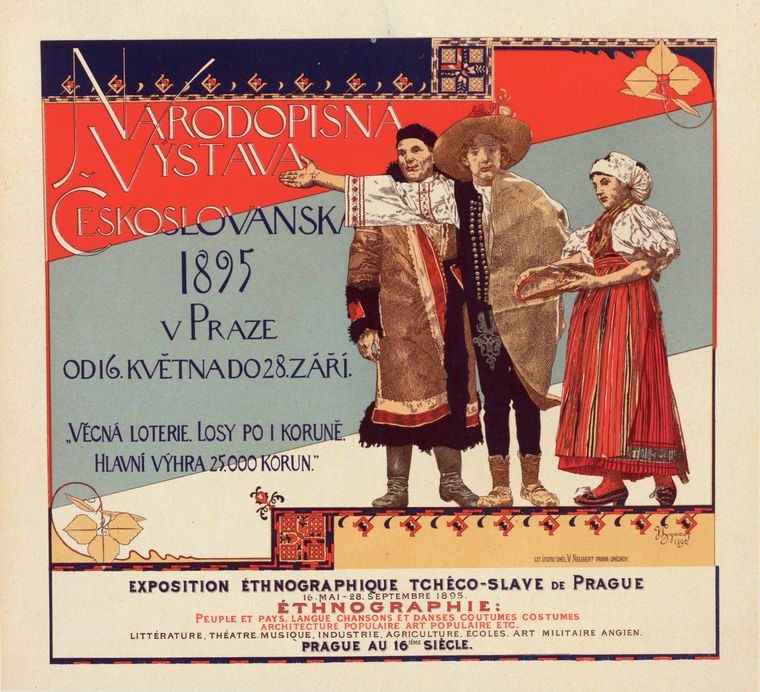
Poster for the 1895 Czechoslovak ethnographic exhibition, by Vojtěch Hynais

For the 1888 Ořechov Ethnography Exhibition, Bakešová reconstructed the girls dance "Little Queens" by speaking to an elderly grandmother. She said that: "we found Grandma Parova …it was just coincidence that it was she, at more than 70 years of age, who was the king (the queen had already died), and that she still could recall the songs. All the other old women were younger than her, but didn’t know all the things she did … We talked to this grandma daily, and everyday she was able to recall something new. Finally the entire ceremony was noted down and rehearsed under her supervision, so that Little Queens could be performed at a small ethnographic exhibition in Ořechov u Brna in 1888." The dance was performed again at the 1895 Czechoslovak ethnographic exhibition in Prague.

== Social activism ==
In 1927, Bakešová was "emotionally struck" by the story of a girl dying of tuberculosis on the street. She wrote an article in the newspaper Lidové noviny, calling for the building of "a House of Peace and Consolation in Brno for people aggravated by chronic disease," She also approached professors of the Faculty of Medicine of Masaryk University in Brno to gain their support for the project. Her campaign led to the construction of Masaryk Hospital, today the Masaryk Institute of Oncology).
