= Vlasta Havelková =

Czech ethnographer, archaeologist and folklorist (1857–1939)

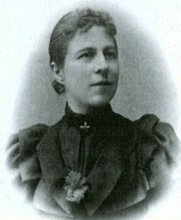
- Born: 16 December 1857; Blansko, Moravia, Austrian Empire
- Died: 16 June 1939 (aged 81); Prague, Czechoslovakia
- Employer(s): Mährische Ornamente; Náprstek Museum
- Organization: Olomouc Ethnographic Society
- Spouse: Jan Havelka (m. 1876, d. 1886)
- Children: 1
- Parents: Jindřich Wankel (father); Eliška Šímová (mother)
- Relatives: Karla Absolonová-Bufková (sister); Lucie Bakešová (sister); Madlena Wanklová (sister); Karel Absolon (nephew); Vladimír Jindřich Bufka (nephew)

Vlasta Havelková (née Wankelová; 16 December 1857 – 16 June 1939) was a Czech ethnographer, archaeologist and collector of folk embroidery. She was member of the Olomouc Ethnographic Society and custodian of the Náprstek Museum in Prague.

== Biography ==
Havelková was born on 16 December 1857 in Blansko, Moravia, Austrian Empire (now in the Czech Republic). She was the second youngest of the four daughters born to Jindřich Wankel, a palaeontologist and archaeologist known as the "father of Moravian archaeology", and his wife Eliška Wanklová (née Šímová), an ethnographer and national revivalist. Her sisters were Karla Absolonová-Bufková, writer and folklorist; Lucie Bakešová, folklorist and social activist; and Madlena Wanklová, writer and feminist.

Havelková was educated at municipal school in Blansko, before studying at the Higher Girls' School in Prague (Czech: Vyšší dívčí škola v Praze), which her elder sister Karla also attended.

On 11 May 1876, Havelková married Jan Havelka, a Moravian high school professor, painter, writer and ethnographer. They had a daughter together called Milada, who became a still life painter and married a professor at the School of Applied Arts in Prague. Havelková was widowed in 1886.

Havelková's husband was responsible for the establishment of the Patriotic Association of Museums in Olomouc, which built the first museum in the city in 1883. Havelková collected thousands of examples of folk textiles for the museum and organized the first ethnographic exhibition. She became the curator of textiles at the Regional Museum in Olomouc (Czech: Vlastivědné muzeum v Olomouci) and was a member of the Olomouc Ethnographic Society.

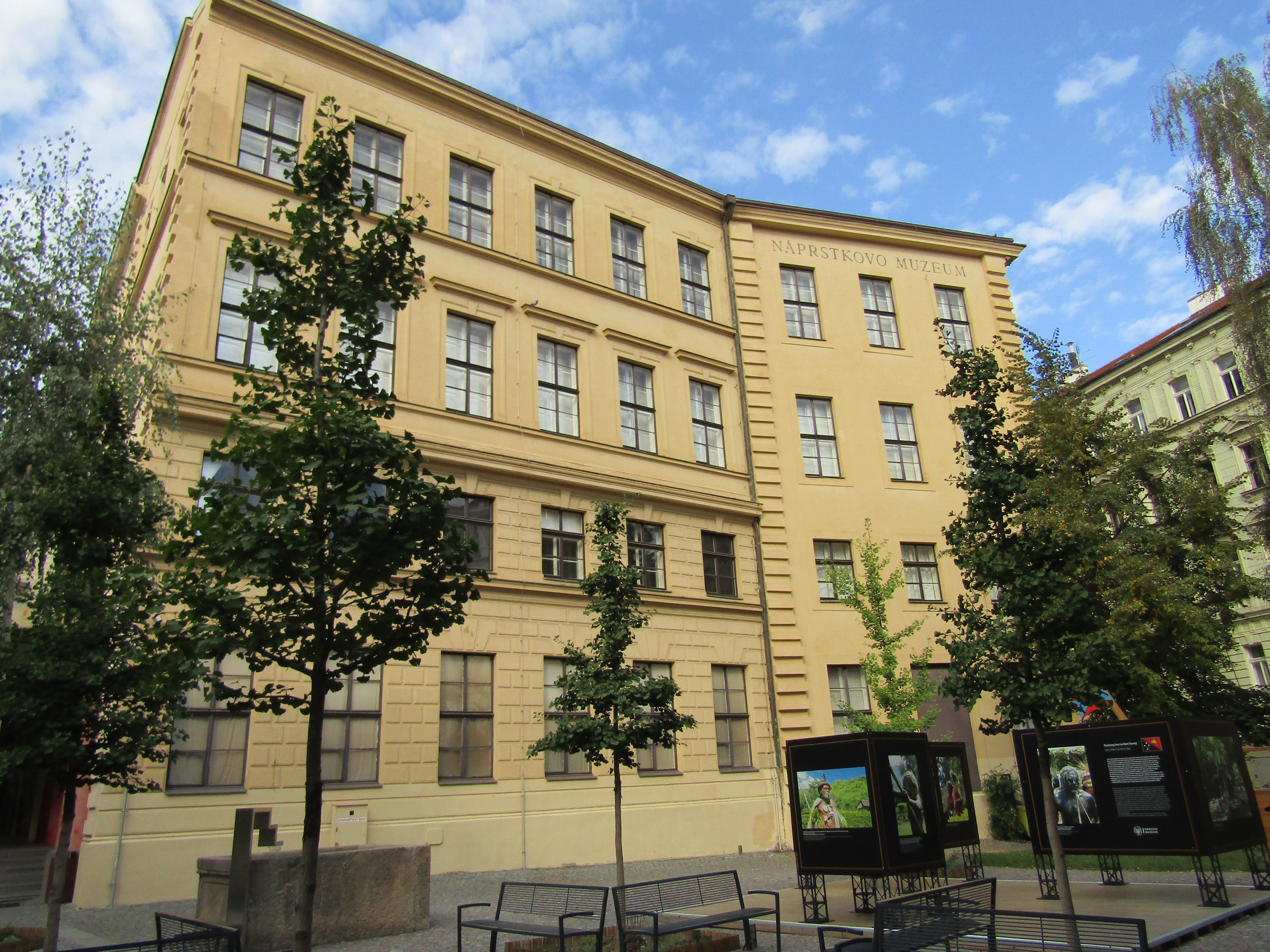
Náprstek Museum in Prague

From 1888 to 1891, Havelková published the journal Mährische Ornamente, which focused on traditional Slavic folk arts. The journal featured contributions from her family, including her father and her sister Madlena. She also actively participated in archaeological research at the Late Pleistocene hill site at Předmostí u Přerova.

From 1906, Havelková was the custodian of the Náprstek Museum in Prague, one of the permanent exhibitions of the Czech National Museum.

Havelková died on 16 June 1939 in Prague, Czechoslovakia, aged 81.

Arne Novák called her the "Moravian grandmother of ethnography."
