= Žerůtky =

Žerůtky may refer to places in the Czech Republic:

- Žerůtky (Blansko District), a municipality and village in the South Moravian Region
- Žerůtky (Znojmo District), a municipality and village in the South Moravian Region
