= Vladimír Jindřich Bufka =

Czech photographer

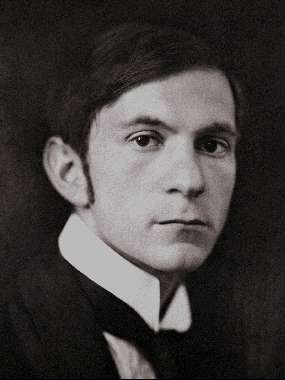
Vladimír Jindřich Bufka, self-portrait, around 1910

Vladimír Jindřich Bufka (16 July 1887 – 23 May 1916) was a Czech photographer and popularizer of photography as well as an important exponent of pictorialism in Czech photography during the early 20th century. Bufka's creative works span a wide range; he practiced landscape photography, architectural photography, photojournalism, still life photography, portrait photography, astrophotography and photomicrography. He was familiar with various photography techniques of the time including gum bichromate, platinum print, bromoil process and autochrome. He also gave lectures and seminars on photography, contributed to various specialized magazines and published a number of books. He died of leukemia at the age of 28.

== Biography ==
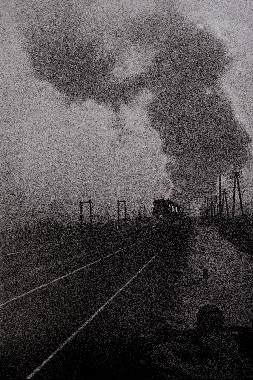
Vladimír Jindřich Bufka: Evening Train, gum bichromate, 1911

Vladimír Jindřich Bufka was born on 16 July 1887, Olomouc-Pavlovičky to the family of a bank officer. Vladimír's half-brother was Karel Absolon and maternal grandfather was Jindřich Wankel – both renowned archaeologists. His mother was writer and folklorist Karla Absolonová-Bufková, whose sisters were ethnographers Vlasta Havelková and Lucie Bakešová.

After graduating from high school, he studied chemistry at the Czech Technical University in Prague. Initially practicing photography as an amateur, he was a member of the Český klub fotografů amatérů (Czech Club of Amateur Photographers). His first photographs were published in 1908 in the illustrated magazine Český svět ("Czech World").

Bufka popularized the autochrome technique, writing several essays on the topic, most importantly O fotografování v barvách pomocí desky autochromové ("On Color Photography with the Help of the Autochrome Plate"), published in 1910. The same year, Bufka published another book: Stručný návod k nejdůležitějším pracím s deskami fotografickými a vyvolávacími papíry ("A Brief Guide to the Most Important Operations with Photographic Plates and with Photographic Paper"). Bufka studied photography techniques in Lyon, France, in the company of the Lumière brothers. In 1909, his lecture on autochrome in Prague is considered to be one of the first attempts to introduce the theory of photography to Bohemia.

From 1910 to 1911, Bufka worked in the Jan Langhans atelier in Prague and extended his knowledge of photography at Hermann C. Kosel's studio in Vienna. In 1911, Bufka opened his own studio in Prague which gradually achieved a popularity comparable with that of the renowned atelier of František Drtikol. In his later years, Bufka travelled to Warsaw and Saint Petersburg with the goal of documenting local art collections. In 1914–1915, he participated in a large photography exhibition held in Prague's Rudolfinum.

BBufka died on 23 May 1916 in Prague. After his death, his studio was managed by his wife Marie Bufková until 1928. Photographs taken there carried the stamp "Ateliér V. J. Bufka" even during the 1920s.

== Work ==
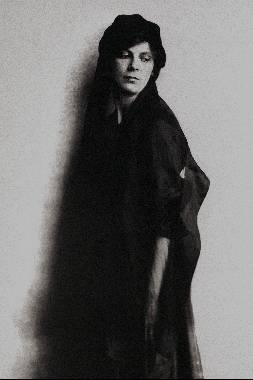
Portrait of artist's wife, Marie Bufková.

Bufka applied his deep knowledge of photographic techniques to his works and regularly explored the complex technical procedures of photography. He attempted to take photos in the evening, in the rain, or in back light. His works are the first of their kind in the Central European context. He found inspiration in various art styles and genres, such as Impressionism, Postimpressionism, Art Nouveau, Symbolism, Decadence, Cubism, Futurism and Art Deco.

== Exhibitions ==
- Jubilejní výstava obchodní a živnostenské komory, Prague (1908)
- Výstava Českého klubu fotografů amatérů, Lucerna Prague (1911)
- Česká fotografická moderna, Uměleko průmyslové muzeum, Prague (1989)
- Photographie der Moderne in Prag 1900–1925, Neue Galerie der Stadt Linz (1991)
- Moravská galerie Brno (2010–2011)

== Bibliography ==
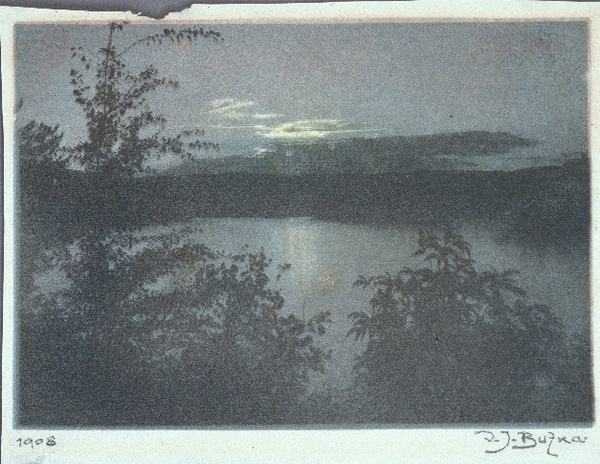
Landscape, 1908.

=== Books ===
- Bufka, Vladimír Jindřich: O fotografování v barvách pomocí desky autochromové (On Color Photography with the Help of Autochrome Plate). E. Weinfurter, Prague 1910
- Bufka, Vladimír Jindřich: Stručný návod k nejdůležitějším pracím s deskami fotografickými a vyvolávacími papíry (A Brief Guide to the Most Important Operations with Photographic Plates and with Photographic Paper). E. Weinfurter, Prague 1910
- Bufka, Vladimír Jindřich: Katechismus fotografie (Catechism of Photography). Hejda a Tuček, Prague 1913

=== Articles ===
- "Internacionální kongres fotografický v Bruselu" (International Photo Congress in Brussels). Fot. věstník 1910, pp. 145–146
- "Od úpatí Matternu a Monte Rosy" (From the Foot of Monte Rosa and Mattern). Světozor, 1910, No 8, pp. 179–180
- "Modní fotografie stylová" (Fashion Photography Style). Český svět VII, No 31, 14 April 1911
- "O vývoji moderní fotografie" (On Development of Modern Photography). Veraikon 1912, pp. 67–69
- "Nejnovější výzkumy ve fotografii" (Recent Studies in Photography). Fot. věstník XXIII, 1912, pp. 161–163, 177–179
- "Moderní fotografie odvětvím uměleckého průmyslu grafického" (Modern Photography as a Part of the Graphic Arts Industry). Dílo 1913, pp. 73–75
- "Za světy hvězdné říše" (To the Worlds of Star Empire). Světozor, No 5, 20 March 1914
- "Praha" (Prague). Klub Za starou Prahu, Prague 1924 (1925, in French)

== Literature ==
- Dufek, Antonín (2010). Vladimír Jindřich Bufka. Prague: Torst (FotoTorst). ISBN 978-80-7215-401-2. (in Czech and English)
