= Okrouhlá =

Okrouhlá may refer to places in the Czech Republic:

- Okrouhlá (Blansko District), a municipality and village in the South Moravian Region
- Okrouhlá (Česká Lípa District), a municipality and village in the Liberec Region
- Okrouhlá (Cheb District), a municipality and village in the Karlovy Vary Region
- Okrouhlá (Písek District), a municipality and village in the South Bohemian Region
