= Bone char =

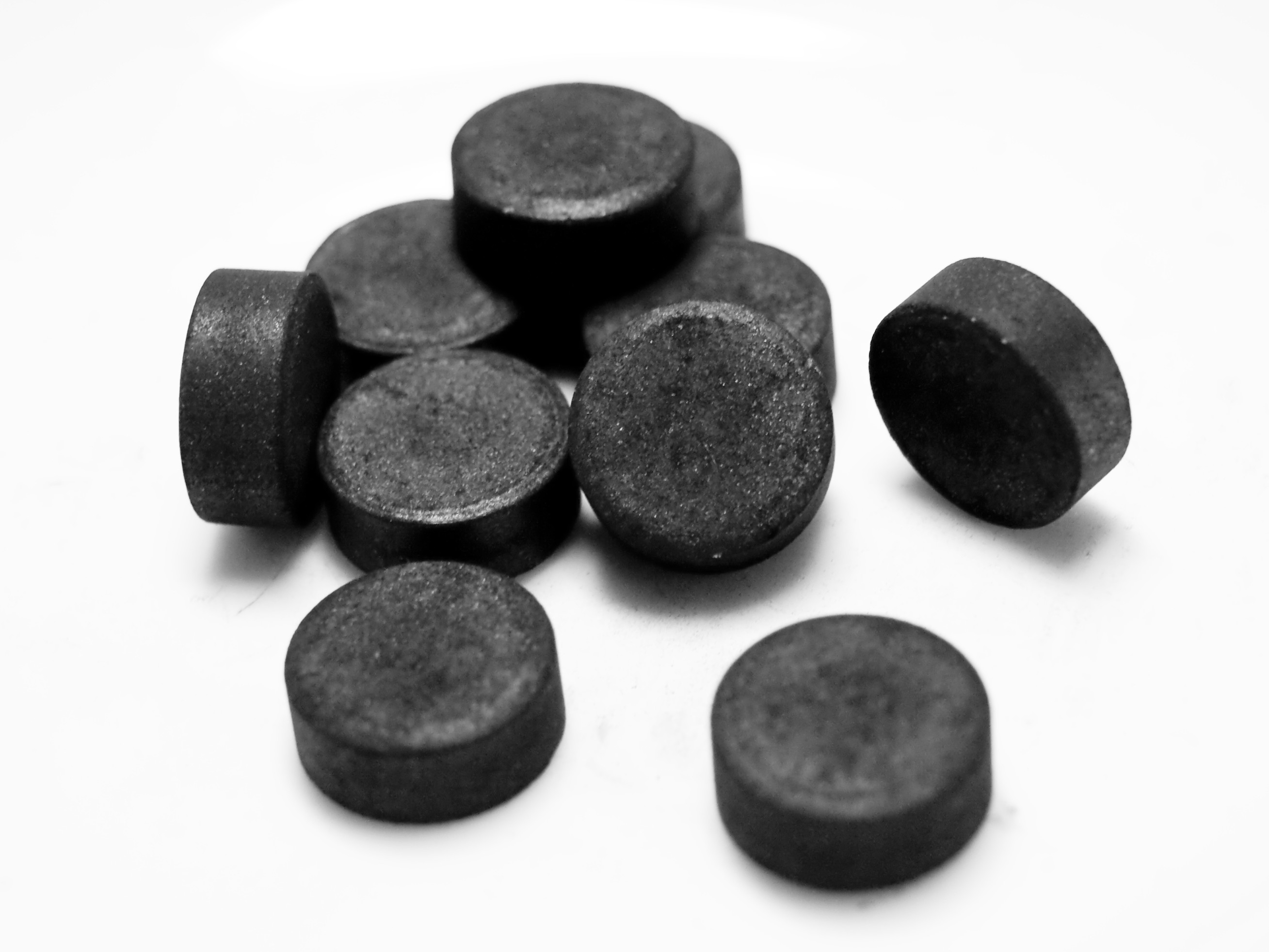
- Pills of bone char

Names
- Other names: bone charcoal; bone black; ivory black; animal charcoal; abaiser; Pigment black 9; CI 77267

Identifiers
CAS Number	8021-99-6
ChemSpider	none
ECHA InfoCard	100.029.470
EC Number	232-421-2
UNII	8X7LUT95FD
CompTox Dashboard (EPA)	DTXSID5027693

Properties
Appearance	black powder
Density	0.7 - 0.8 g/cm^{3}
Solubility in water	insoluble
Acidity (pK_{a})	8.5 - 10.0
- Except where otherwise noted, data are given for materials in their standard state (at 25 °C [77 °F], 100 kPa). Infobox references

Bone char (Latin: carbo animalis) is a porous, black, granular material produced by charring animal bones. Its composition varies depending on how it is made; however, it consists mainly of tricalcium phosphate (or hydroxyapatite) 57–80%, calcium carbonate 6–10% and carbon 7–10%. It is primarily used for filtration and decolorisation.

== Production ==
Bone char is primarily made from cattle and pig bones; however, to prevent the spread of variant Creutzfeldt–Jakob disease, the skull and spine are no longer used. The bones are heated in a sealed vessel at up to 700 °C (1,292 °F); the oxygen concentration must be kept low while doing this, as it affects the quality of the product, particularly its adsorption capacity. Most of the organic material in the bones is driven off by heat, and was historically collected as Dippel's oil; that which is not driven off remains as activated carbon in the final product. Heating bones in an oxygen-rich atmosphere gives bone ash, which is chemically quite different.

Used bone char can be regenerated by washing with hot water to remove impurities, followed by heating to 500 °C (932 °F) in a kiln with a controlled amount of air.

== Uses ==
=== Water treatment ===
The tricalcium phosphate in bone char can be used to remove fluoride and metal ions from water, making it useful for the treatment of drinking supplies. Bone charcoal is the oldest known water defluoridation agent and was widely used in the United States from the 1940s through to the 1960s. As it can be generated cheaply and locally it is still used in certain developing countries, such as Tanzania. Bone chars usually have lower surface areas than activated carbons, but present high adsorptive capacities for certain metals, particularly those from group 12 (copper, zinc, and cadmium). Other highly toxic metal ions, such as those of arsenic and lead may also be removed. The practical example of the use of bone char in water purification is demonstrated by use of nanofiltration in Tanzania.

=== Sugar refining ===
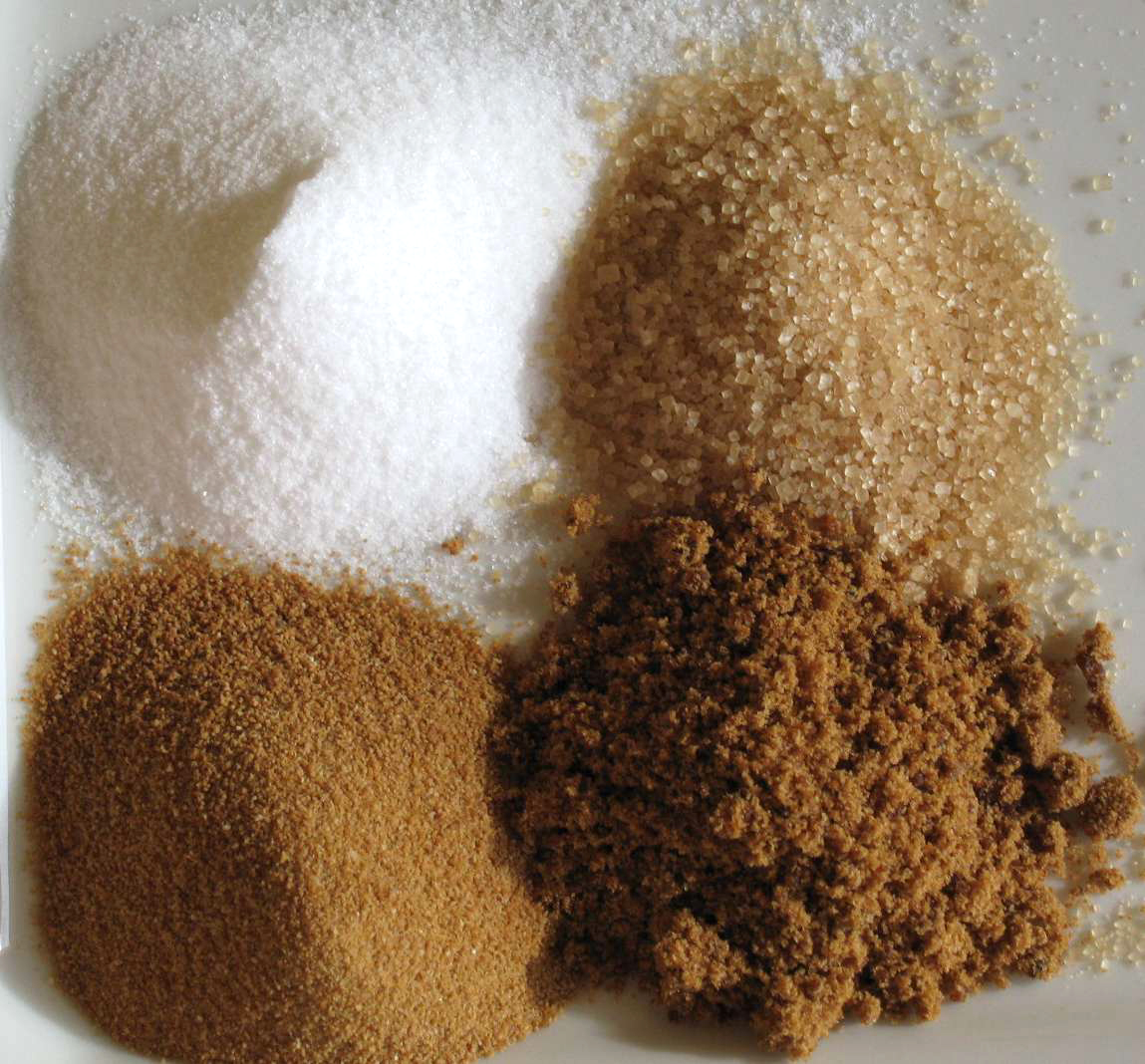
Sugars (clockwise from top-left): white refined, unrefined, unprocessed cane, brown

Historically, bone char was often used in sugar refining as a decolorizing and deashing agent, particularly in cane sugar as this contains more colored impurities.

Bone char possesses a low decoloration capacity and must be used in large quantities, however, it is also able to remove various inorganic impurities, most importantly sulfates and the ions of magnesium and calcium. The removal of these is beneficial, as it reduces the level of scaling later in the refining process, when the sugar solution is concentrated. Modern alternatives to bone char include activated carbon and ion-exchange resins. However, a small number of companies remain completely or partially dependent on bone char for sugar refinement.

=== Black pigment ===
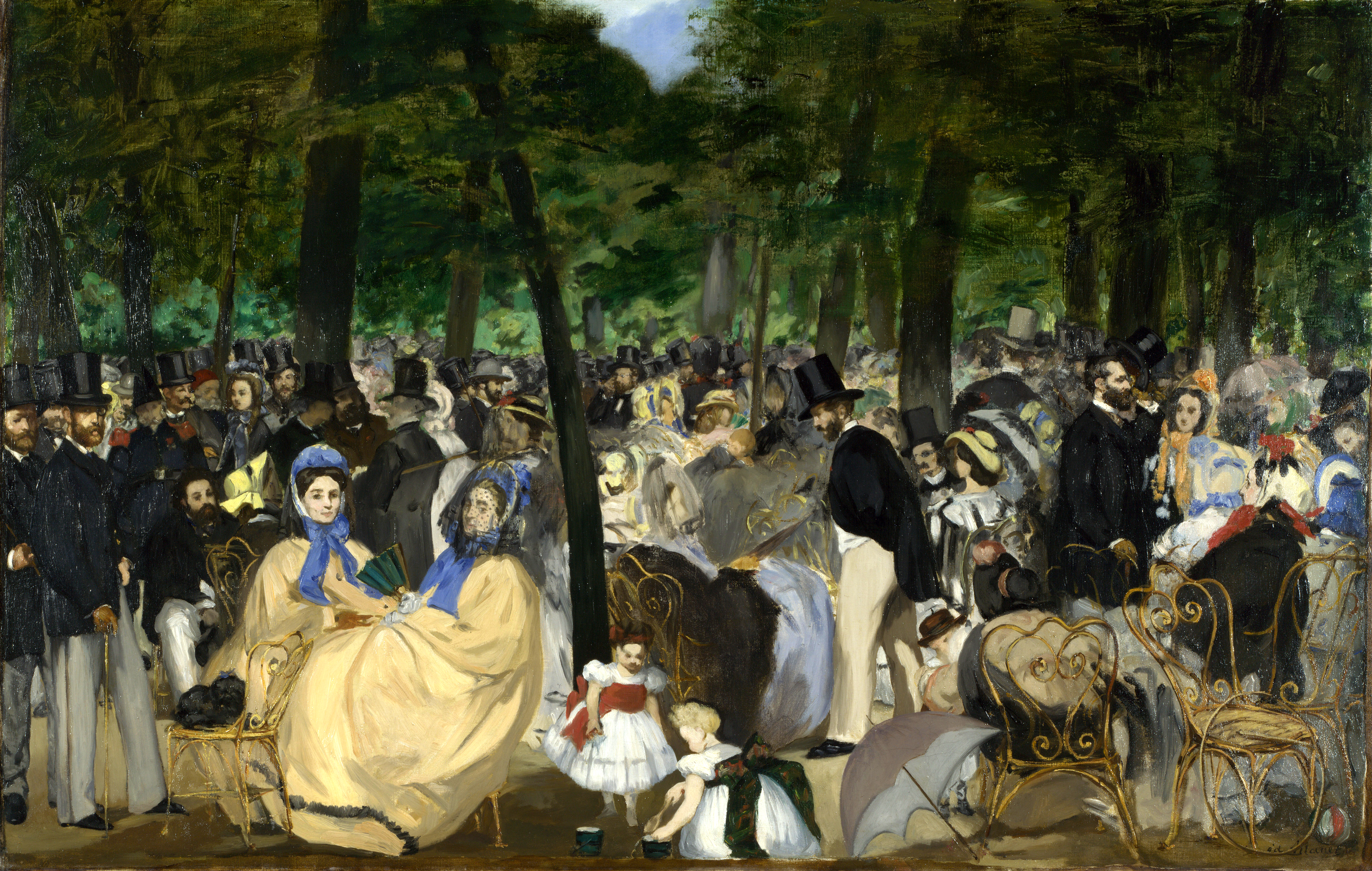
Édouard Manet, Music in the Tuileries, 1862

Bone char is also used as a black pigment for artist's paint, printmaking, calligraphic and drawing inks as well as other artistic applications because of its deepness of color and excellent tinting strength. Bone black and ivory black are artists' pigments which have been in use since historic times—by both old masters like Rembrandt and Velázquez and more modern painters such as Manet and Picasso. The black dresses and high hats of the gentlemen in Manet's Music in the Tuileries are painted in ivory black.

Ivory black was formerly made by grinding charred ivory in oil. Nowadays ivory black is considered a synonym for bone black. Actual ivory is no longer used because of the expense and because animals that are natural sources of ivory are subject to international control as endangered species.

=== Niche uses ===
- It is used to refine crude oil in the production of petroleum jelly.
- In the 18th and 19th centuries, bone char mixed with tallow or wax (or both) was used by soldiers in the field to impregnate military leather equipment, both to increase its lifespan and as the simplest way to obtain pigment for black leatherware. Military and civilians used it as shoe polish and preservative, including on shoes with the "rough" side out. In period reference materials, it is referred to as "black ball".
- The ESA-NASA Solar Orbiter satellite uses a refined form of bone char applied to its titanium heatshield. This protects it against the glare and heat of the sun. Irish company Embio developed the coating and uses its 'CoBlast' technique, originally developed to coat titanium medical implants.

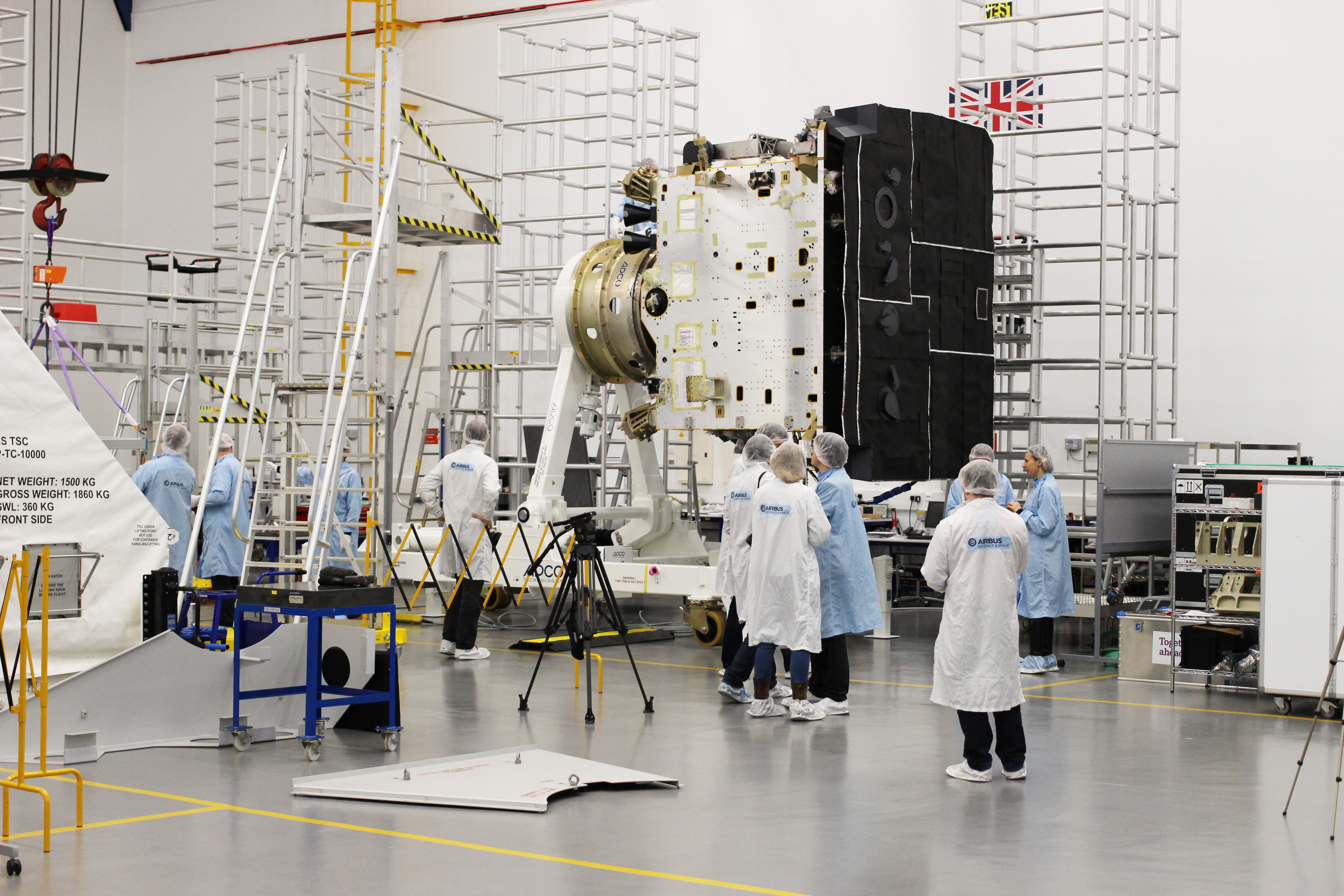
This photo shows the Solar Orbiter with its black, bone char coated heatshield.

== In popular culture ==
- The production of bone char was featured on the Discovery Channel's TV series Dirty Jobs, on episode 19 of season 5, "Bone Black", originally broadcast on 9 February 2010.
- Human bone char, referred to as "bone charcoal", is mentioned in Thomas Pynchon's novel The Crying of Lot 49. The bones come from US soldiers who died in combat during WWII and were buried in a lake in Italy, and the char is used for filters in cigarettes.
- Human bone char is mentioned in Jaroslav Hašek's novel The Good Soldier Švejk. The work contains a reference to soldiers not dying in vain because their bones will be used to make bone charcoal ("spodium") for sugar refineries, the protagonist getting disciplined by his commander for wondering whether the coal from officers' bones is sold to the refineries at a higher price than that made from ordinary privates' bones.

== See also ==
- Activated carbon
- Carbon black
- Potash
