= Předmostí u Přerova =

Archaeological site in the Czech Republic

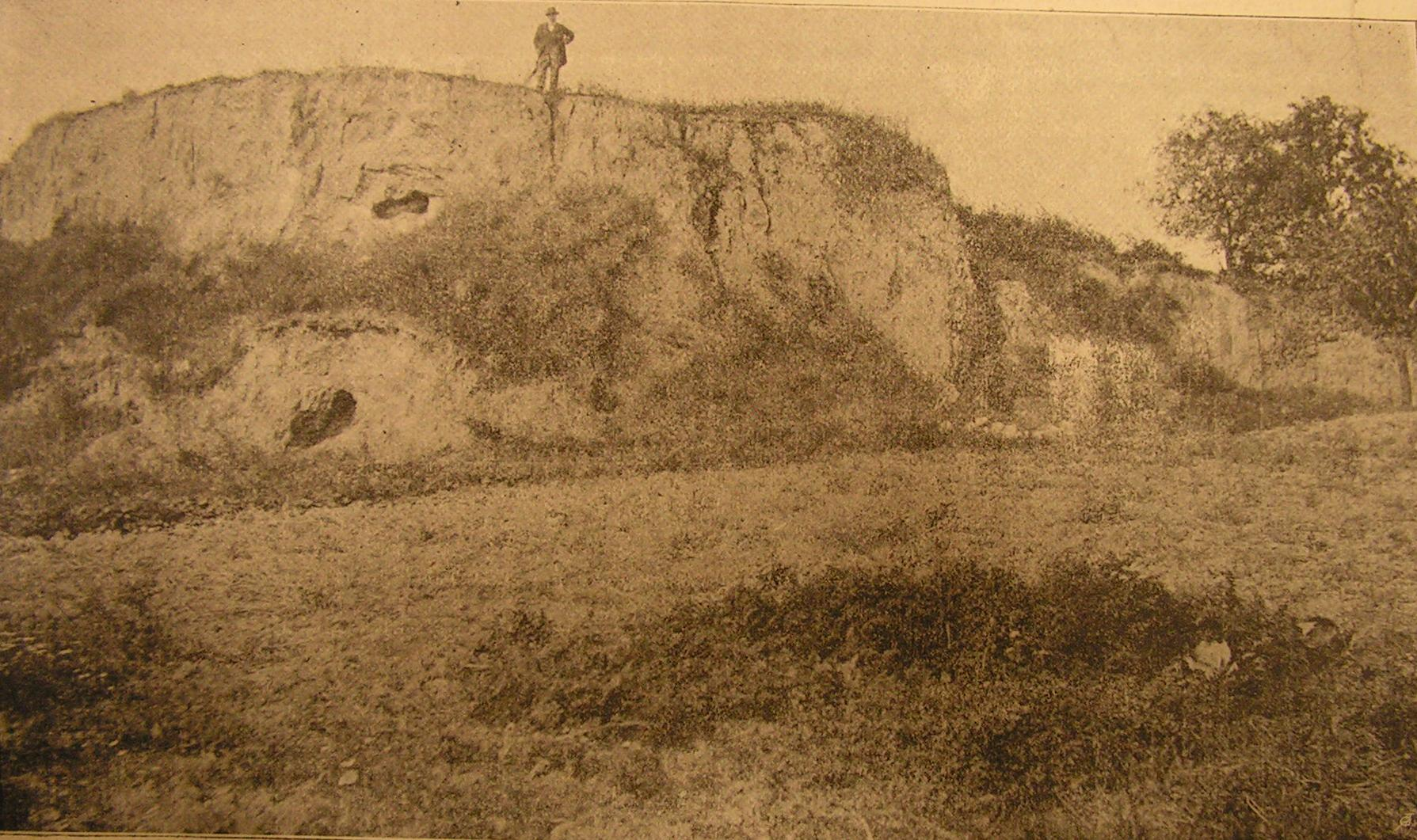
- Clay dune – clay pit of Chromeček

Highest point
- Elevation: 250 m (820 ft)
- Prominence: 35 m (115 ft)
- Coordinates: 49°27′56″N 17°26′23″E

Dimensions
- Area: 37 acres (15 ha)

Geography
- Location within Czech Republic
- Location: Czech Republic
- Parent range: Moravian Gate/Nízký Jeseník

Geology
- Rock age: Late Pleistocene

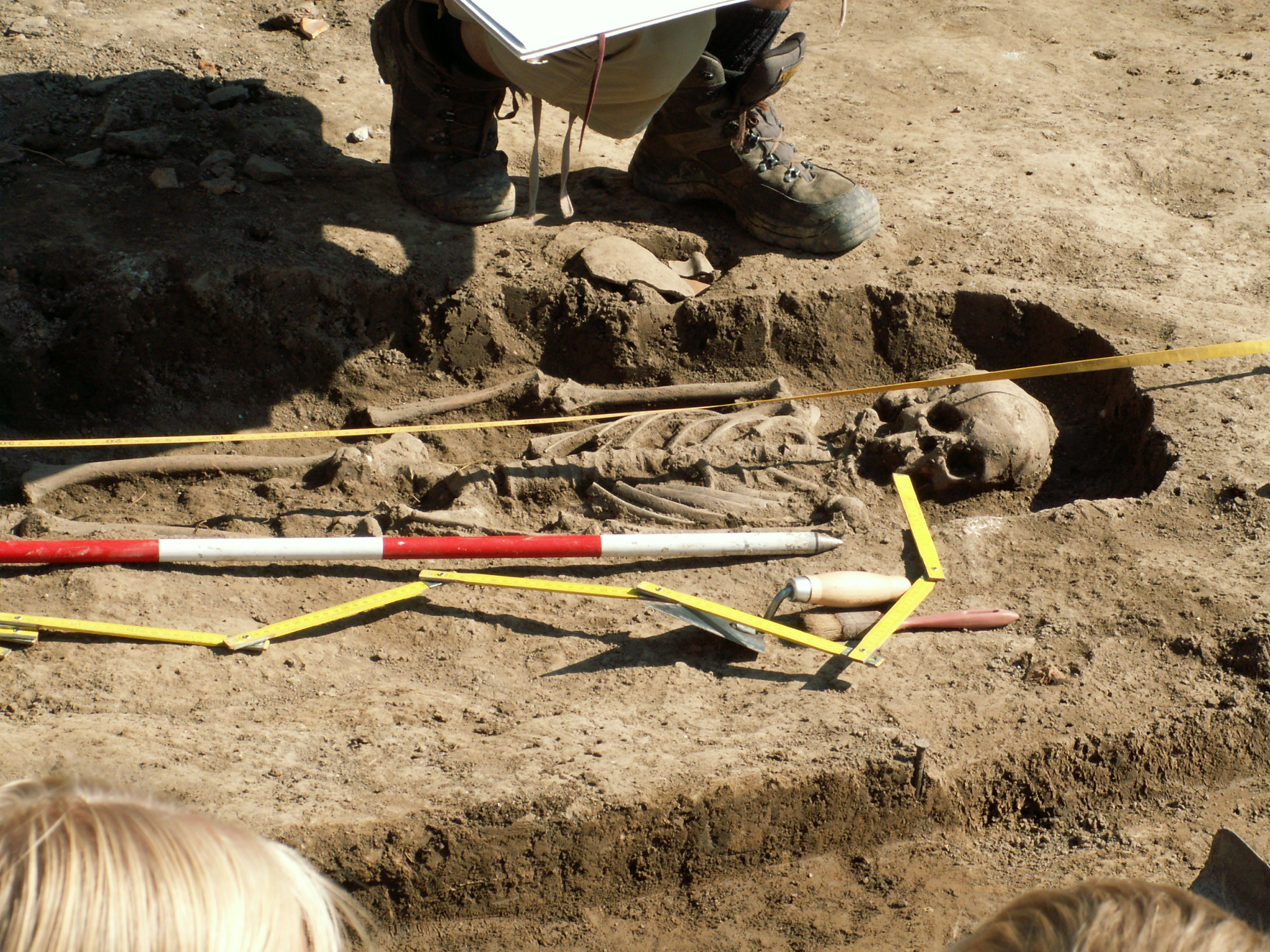
Skeleton discovered in the last archaeological exploration 2006

Předmostí u Přerova (also called Skalka; formerly Anglicised as Predmost) is an archaeological site in the northwestern part of Přerov in what is today the Czech Republic. It is an important Late Pleistocene hill site of Central Europe.

== Description ==
A fossil site at Předmostí u Přerova is located near Přerov in what is today the Czech Republic. The site was discovered in the late 19th century, when Přerov was part of Moravia within Austria-Hungary. Excavations were conducted between 1884 and 1930. The original material was lost. The skeletal remains of the few dozen people from Předmostí are among the most important finds ever made of anatomically modern humans, and are accompanied by items from the Gravettian culture. A major restriction on the opportunities available for extracting information from this Upper Paleolithic population assembly, however, came with the irreparable damage done to the skeletal material during fire at Mikulov Castle near the end of World War II, which almost completely destroyed the entire collection. For many years, the only sources of scientific information relating to the assemblage available were the two-volume work by Jindřich Matiegka (1934 and 1938) and casts made of the skulls of individuals Předmostí 3 and Předmostí 4, and the endocrania of individuals Předmostí 3, 4, 9 and 10^{1}, in the collection of Moravian Museum in Brno.

A fragment of Předmostí 21's mandible was rediscovered in the Museum of Olomouc.

New excavations were conducted.

The Předmostí site appears to have been a living area with associated burial ground with some 20 burials, including 15 complete human interments, and portions of five others, representing either disturbed or secondary burials. Cannibalism has been suggested to explain the apparent subsequent disturbance, though it is not widely accepted. The non-human fossils are mostly mammoth. Many of the bones are heavily charred, indicating they were cooked. Other remains include fox, reindeer, ice-age horse, wolf, bear, wolverine, and hare. Remains of three dogs were also found, one of which had a mammoth bone in its mouth.

The Předmostí site is dated to between 24,000 and 37,000 years old. The people had robust features indicative of a big-game hunter lifestyle. They also share square eye socket openings found in the French material. Skulls of Předmostí individuals are significantly longer and more robust than of modern Europeans, with thick brow ridges, and prognathism, and show marked sexual dimorphism. They also display a degree of variability.

== History of research ==
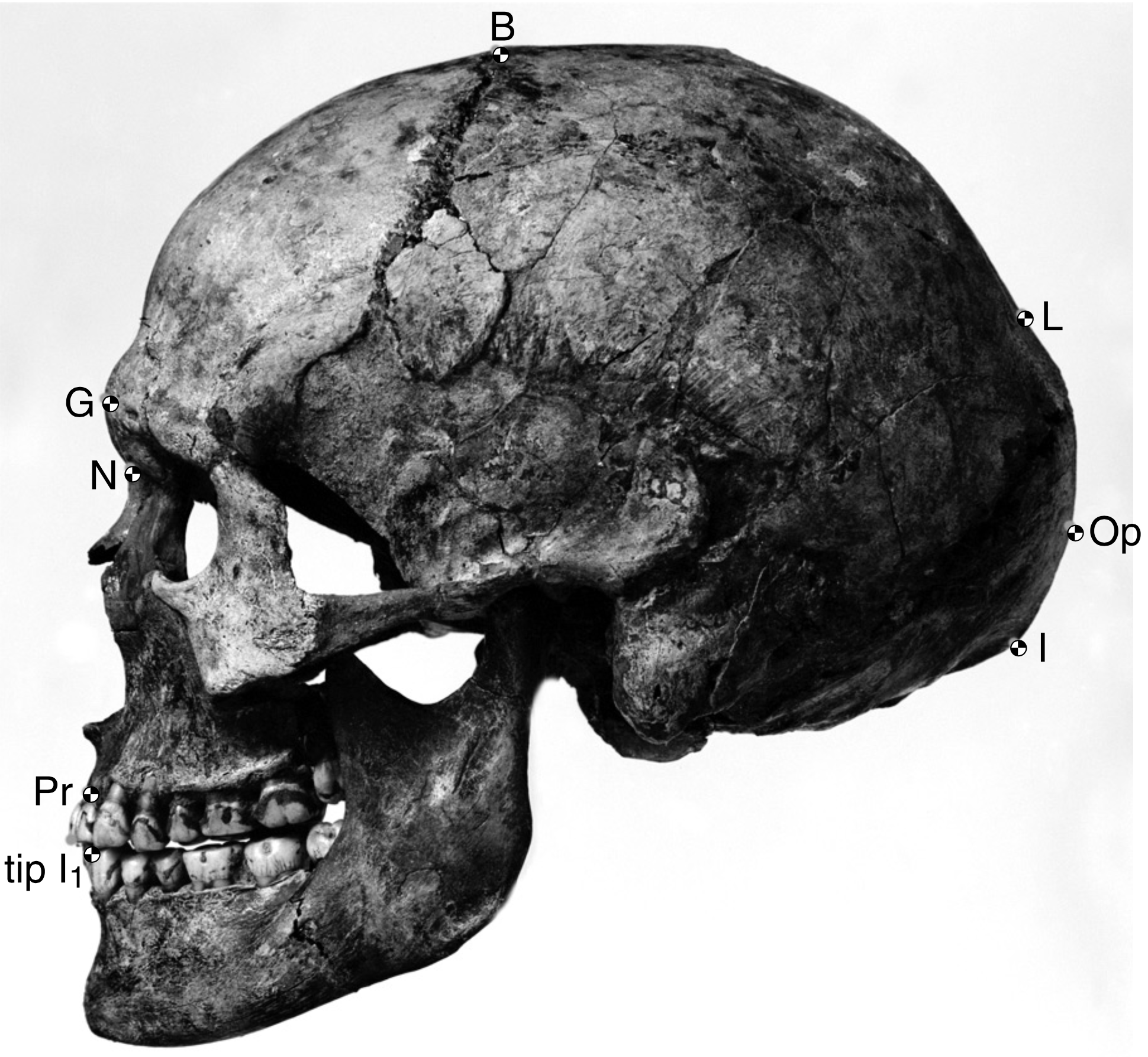
Předmostí 9 skull, destroyed in 1945

It was here that Jindřich Wankel, and shortly afterwards Karel Jaroslav Maška himself, conducted their excavations. Two years after the words above were written, the endeavours of K. J. Maška – an amateur archaeologist with a professional approach – were crowned by the discovery of human bones on an unprecedented scale, together with the first find of a human lower jaw made by Wankel in 1884 and the later finds of M. Kříž (1886) and Karel Absolon (1929), there were the fossil human remains discovered at Předmostí.

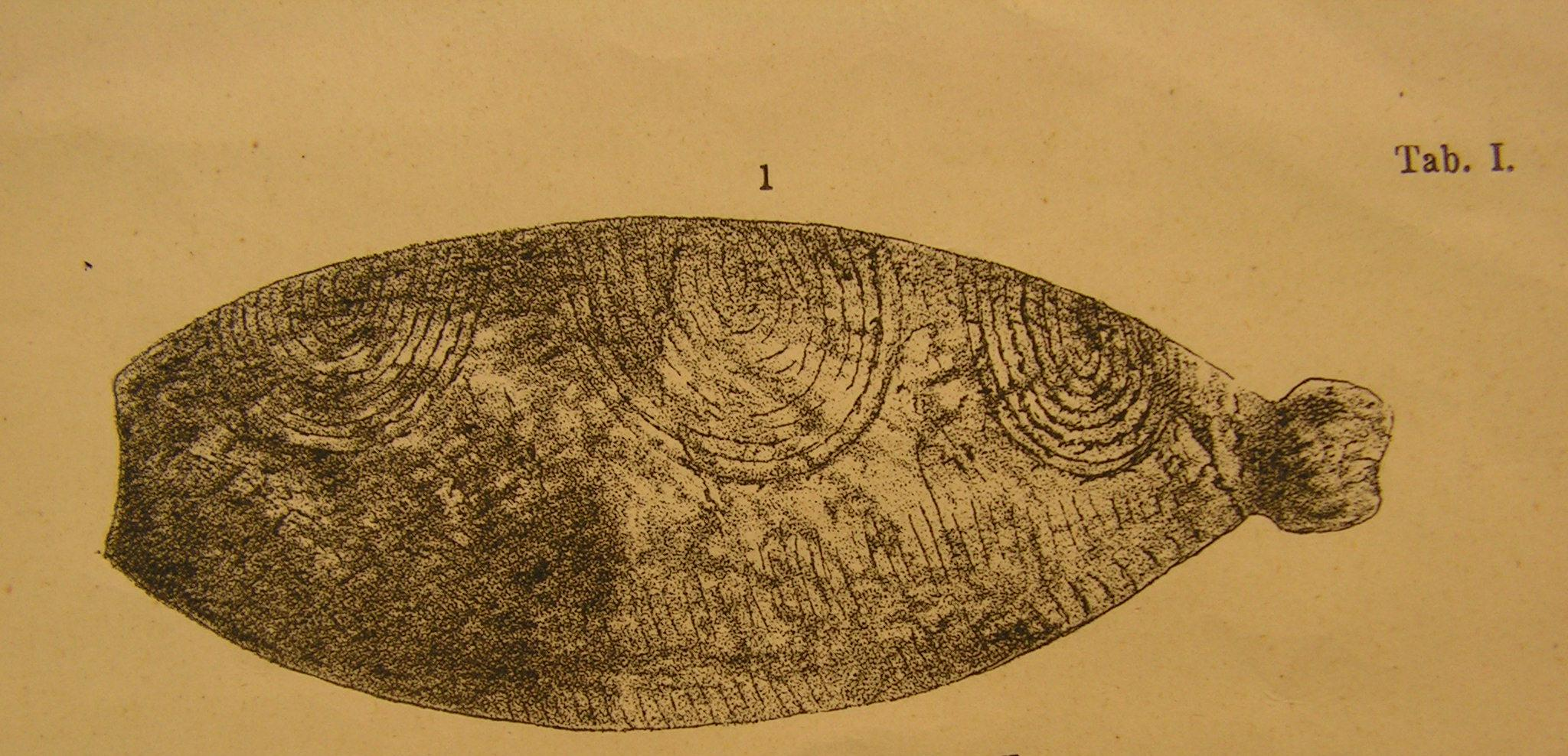
The Bond pendant

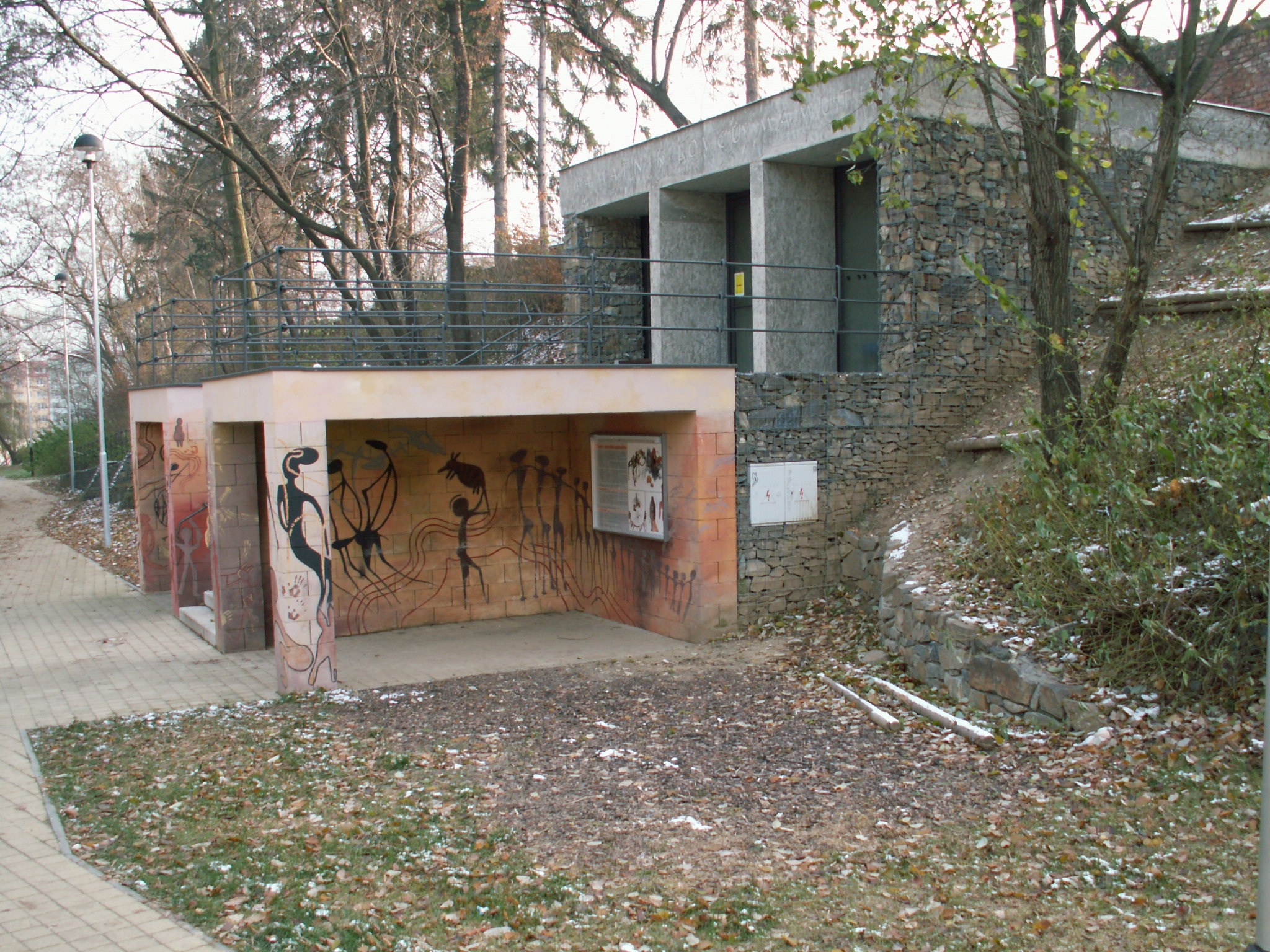
Memorial of hunters in situ

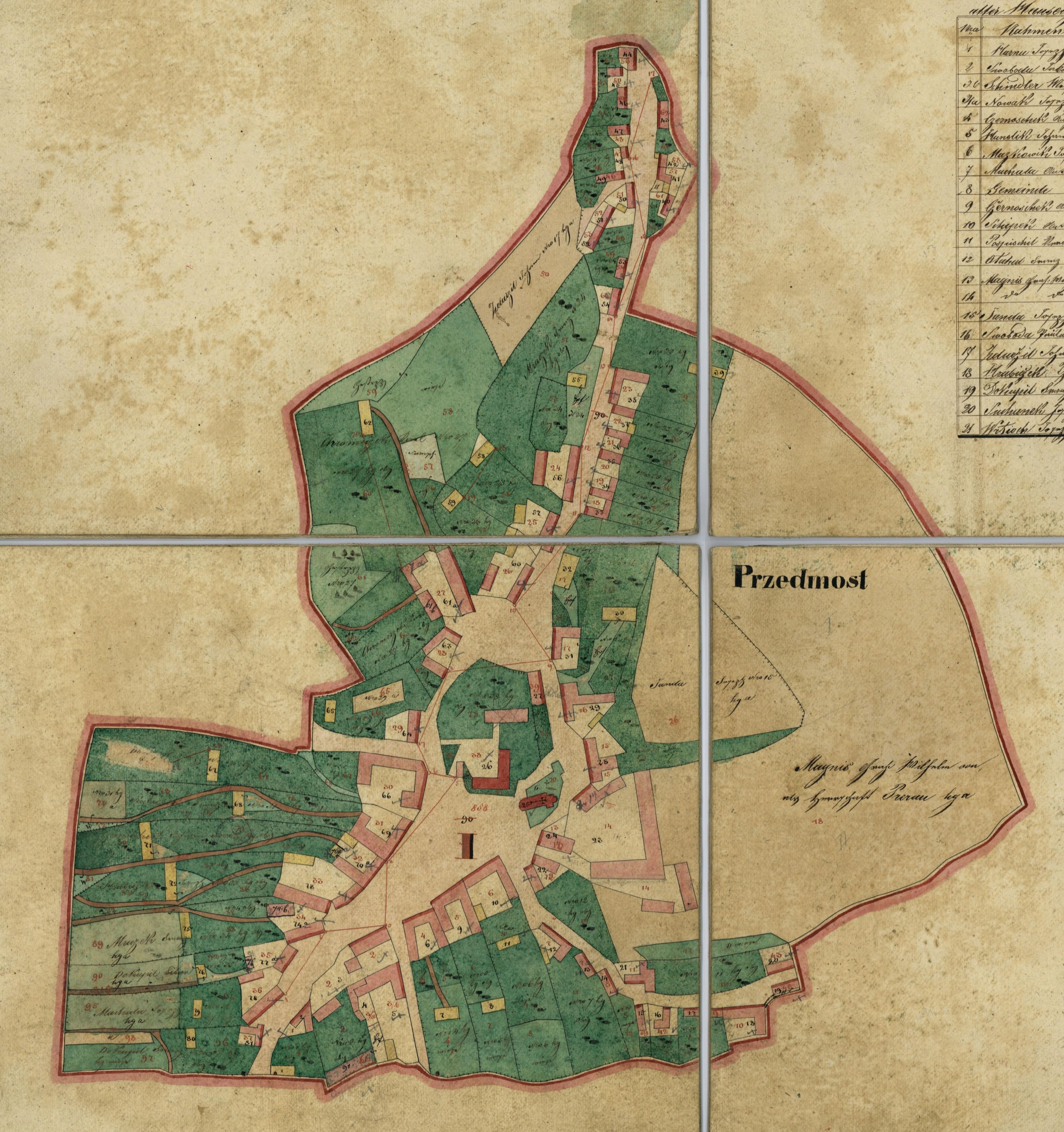
Old map of Předmostí 1830, earlier than research start

Map of Cro-Magnon migration, stage -32 000.
