= Ludíkov =

- Municipality
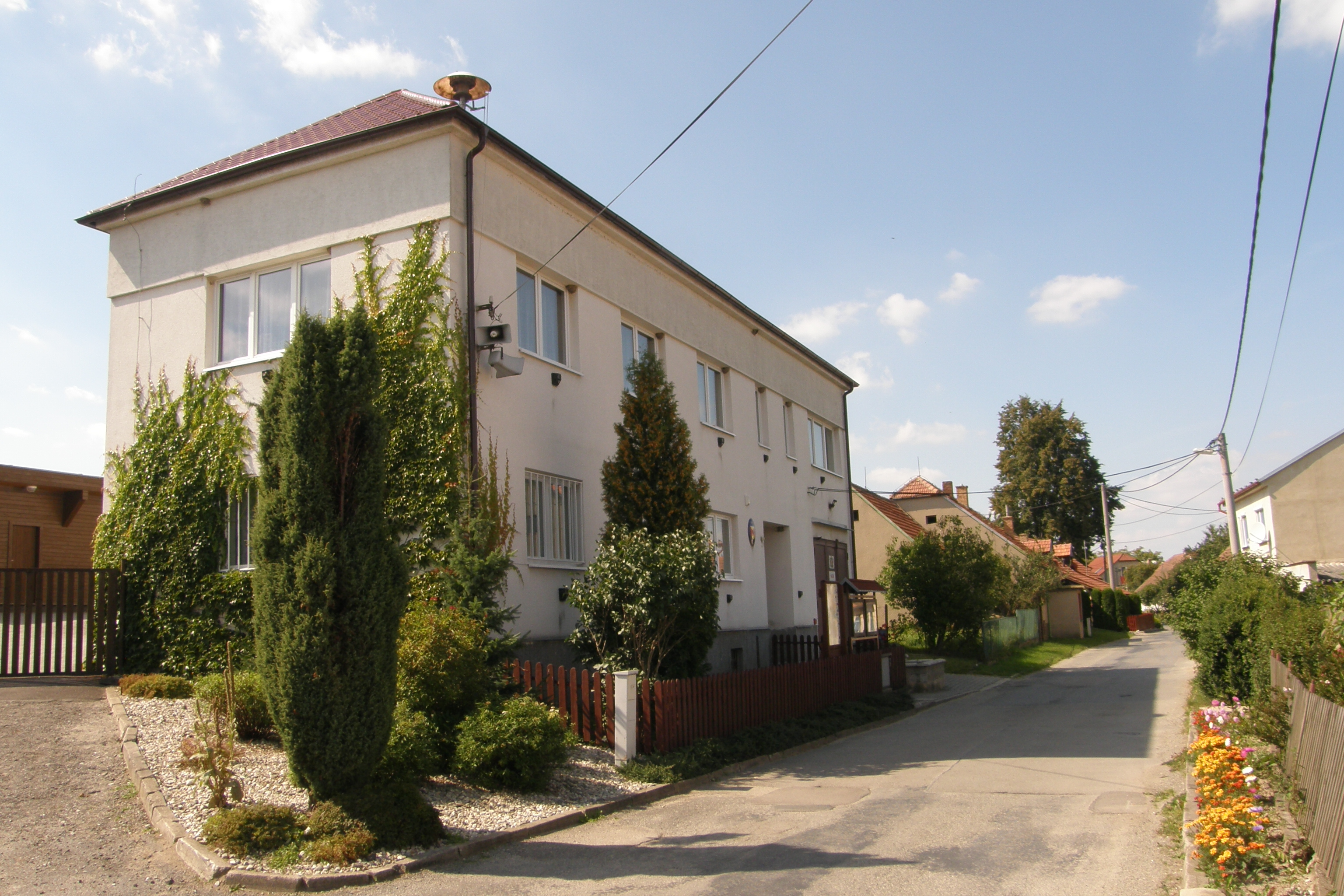
- Municipal office

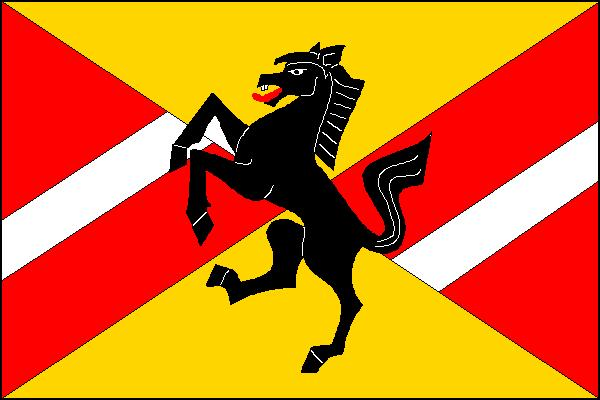
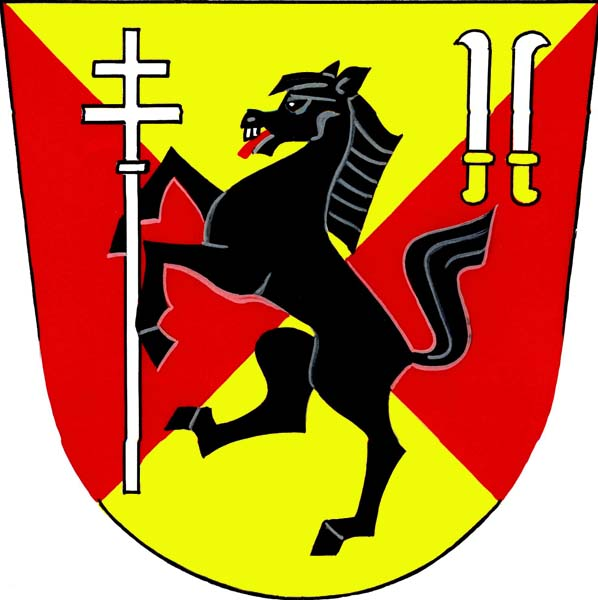
- Flag Coat of arms

- Location in the Czech Republic
- Coordinates: 49°27′20″N 16°43′55″E
- Country: Czech Republic
- Region: South Moravian
- District: Blansko
- First mentioned: 1505

Area
  - Total: 4.04 km^{2} (1.56 sq mi)
- Elevation: 607 m (1,991 ft)

Population (2026-01-01)
  - Total: 365
  - Density: 90.3/km^{2} (234/sq mi)
- Time zone: UTC+1 (CET)
  - Summer (DST): UTC+2 (CEST)
- Postal code: 680 01
- Website: ludikov.cz

Ludíkov is a municipality and village in Blansko District in the South Moravian Region of the Czech Republic. It has about 400 inhabitants.

Ludíkov lies approximately 12 kilometres (7 mi) north-east of Blansko, 30 km (19 mi) north of Brno, and 181 km (112 mi) south-east of Prague.

== Demographics ==
Historical population
Year	Pop.	±%
1869	316	—
1880	321	+1.6%
1890	353	+10.0%
1900	341	−3.4%
1910	379	+11.1%
1921	360	−5.0%
1930	417	+15.8%
1950	379	−9.1%
1961	394	+4.0%
1970	352	−10.7%
1980	334	−5.1%
1991	316	−5.4%
2001	296	−6.3%
2011	307	+3.7%
2021	326	+6.2%
Source: Censuses
