= Cetkovice =

- Municipality
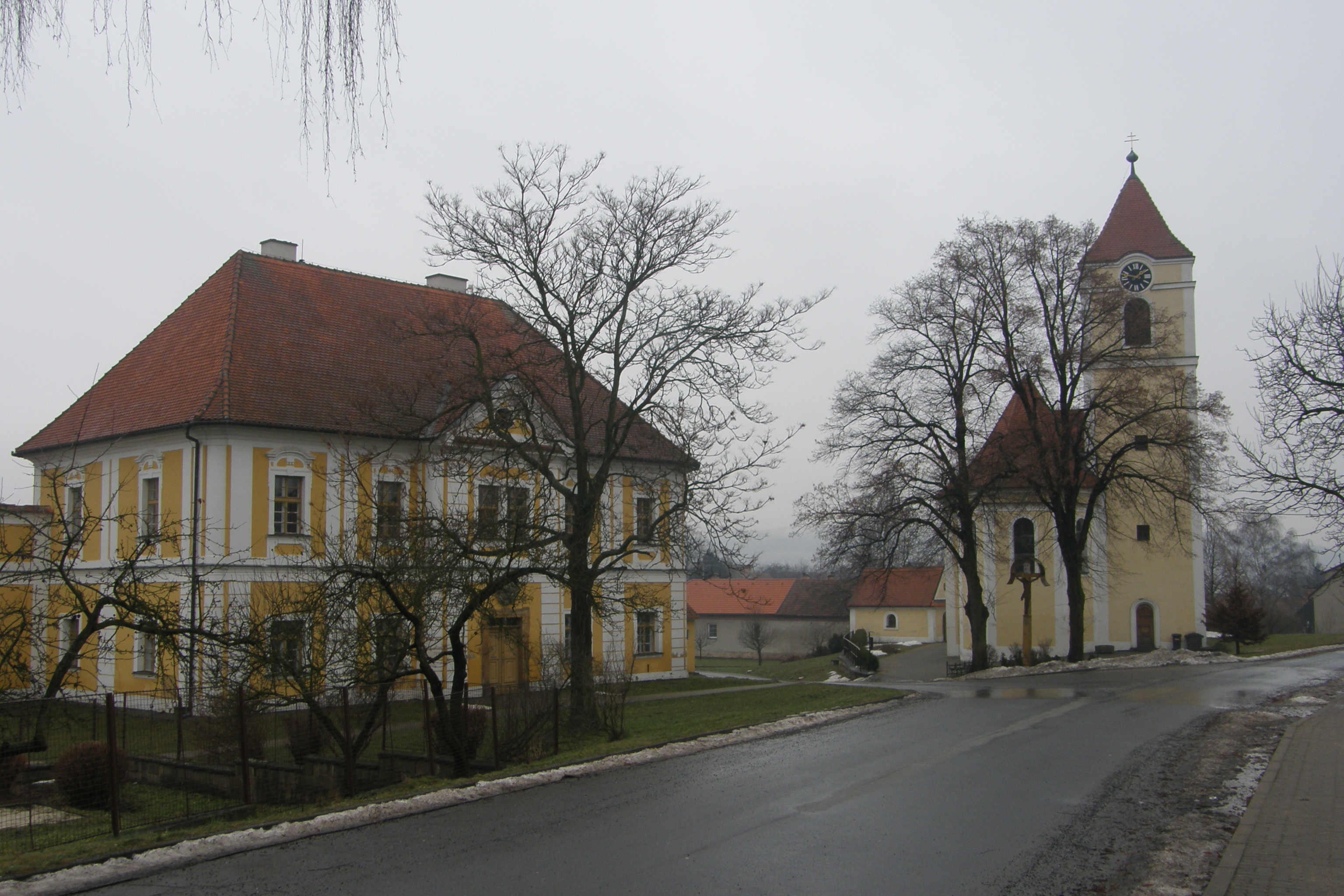
- Rectory and Church of Saints Philip and James

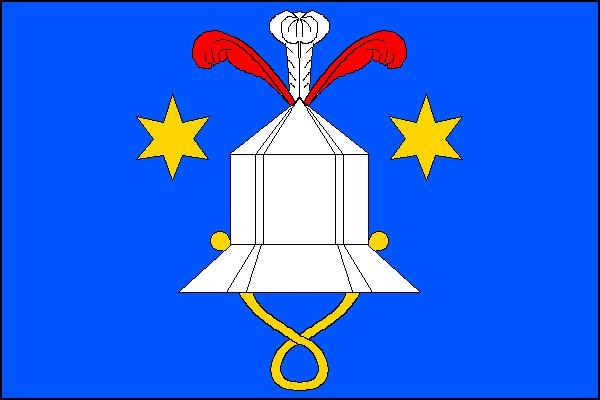
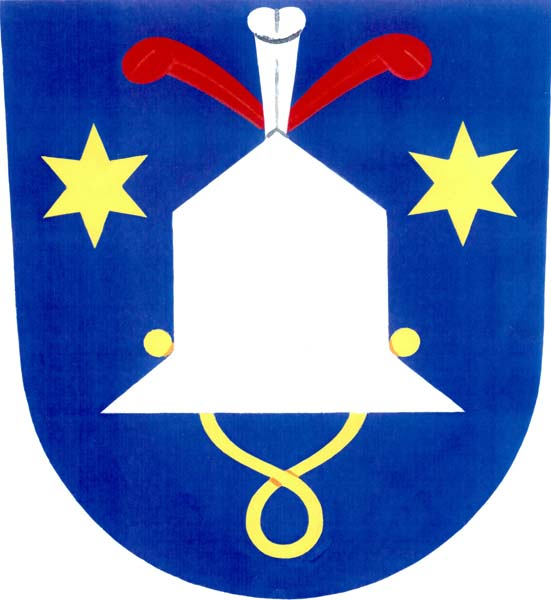
- Flag Coat of arms

- Location in the Czech Republic
- Coordinates: 49°34′44″N 16°43′17″E
- Country: Czech Republic
- Region: South Moravian
- District: Blansko
- First mentioned: 1160

Area
  - Total: 8.53 km^{2} (3.29 sq mi)
- Elevation: 406 m (1,332 ft)

Population (2026-01-01)
  - Total: 783
  - Density: 91.8/km^{2} (238/sq mi)
- Time zone: UTC+1 (CET)
  - Summer (DST): UTC+2 (CEST)
- Postal code: 679 38
- Website: www.cetkovice.cz

Cetkovice is a municipality and village in Blansko District in the South Moravian Region of the Czech Republic. It has about 800 inhabitants.

Cetkovice lies approximately 25 kilometres (16 mi) north of Blansko, 43 km (27 mi) north of Brno, and 175 km (109 mi) east of Prague.

== History ==
The first written mention of Cetkovice is from 1160.

== Demographics ==
Historical population
Year	Pop.	±%
1869	835	—
1880	817	−2.2%
1890	778	−4.8%
1900	823	+5.8%
1910	866	+5.2%
1921	777	−10.3%
1930	780	+0.4%
1950	640	−17.9%
1961	677	+5.8%
1970	677	+0.0%
1980	684	+1.0%
1991	675	−1.3%
2001	718	+6.4%
2011	696	−3.1%
2021	707	+1.6%
Source: Censuses
