= Vanovice =

- Municipality
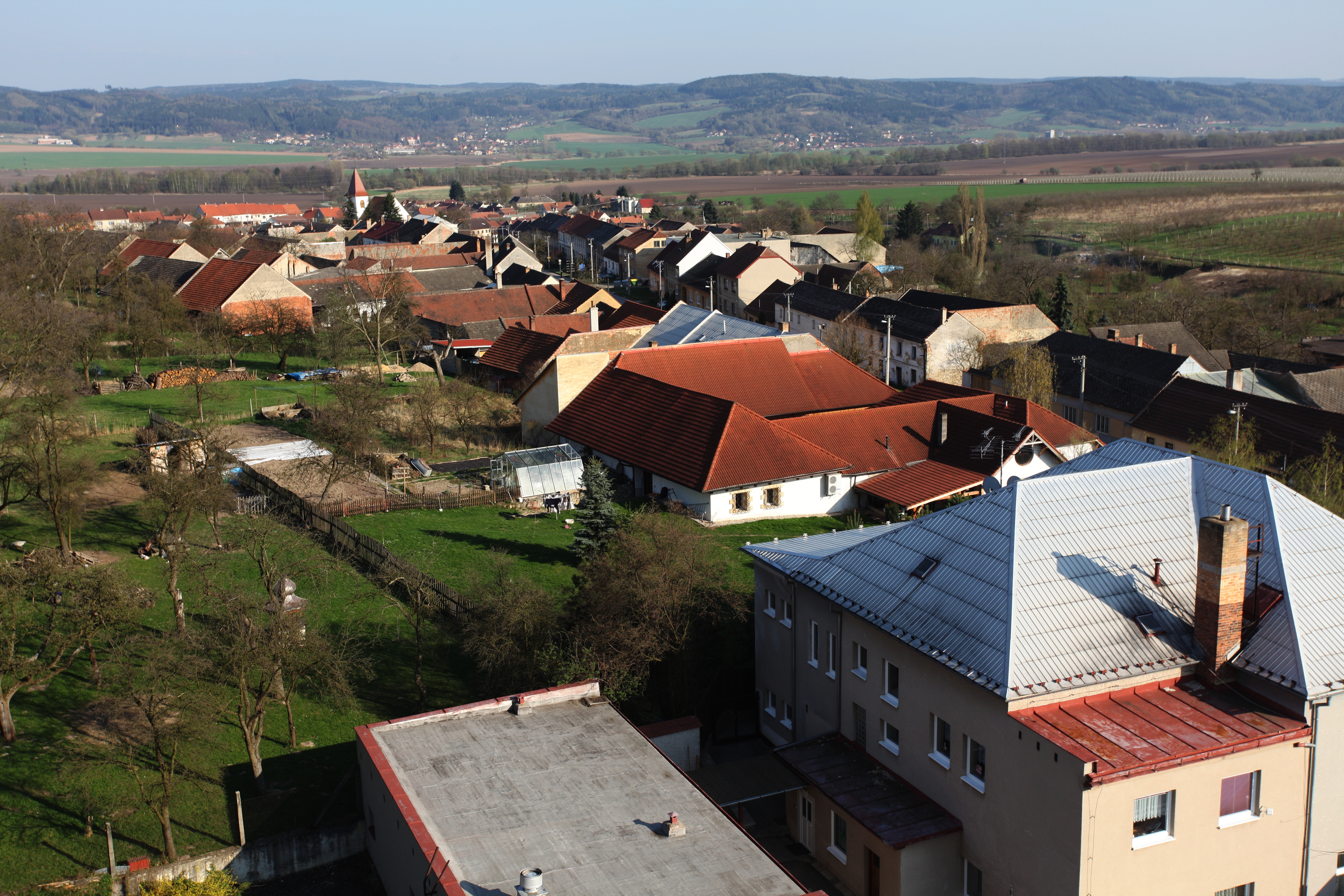
- General view

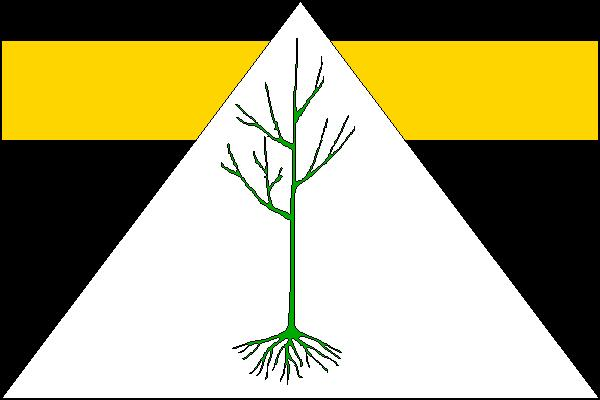
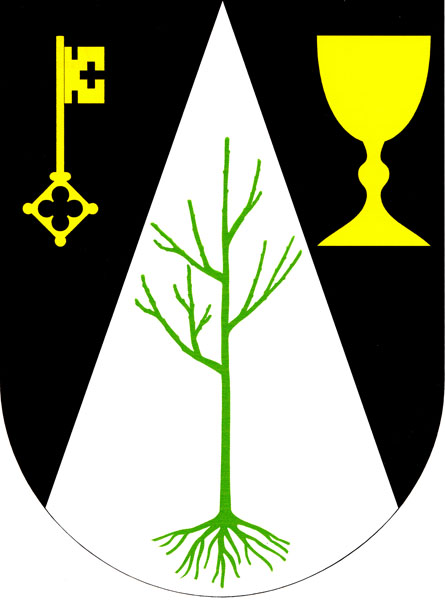
- Flag Coat of arms

- Location in the Czech Republic
- Coordinates: 49°34′2″N 16°39′58″E
- Country: Czech Republic
- Region: South Moravian
- District: Blansko
- First mentioned: 1233

Area
  - Total: 12.15 km^{2} (4.69 sq mi)
- Elevation: 430 m (1,410 ft)

Population (2026-01-01)
  - Total: 571
  - Density: 47.0/km^{2} (122/sq mi)
- Time zone: UTC+1 (CET)
  - Summer (DST): UTC+2 (CEST)
- Postal code: 679 36
- Website: vanovice.cz

Vanovice (German: Wanowitz) is a municipality and village in Blansko District in the South Moravian Region of the Czech Republic. It has about 600 inhabitants.

Vanovice lies approximately 23 kilometres (14 mi) north of Blansko, 42 km (26 mi) north of Brno, and 172 km (107 mi) east of Prague.

== Administrative division ==
Vanovice consists of two municipal parts (in brackets population according to the 2021 census):

- Vanovice (408)
- Drválovice (129)

== Demographics ==
Historical population
Year	Pop.	±%
1869	995	—
1880	994	−0.1%
1890	958	−3.6%
1900	962	+0.4%
1910	1,003	+4.3%
1921	941	−6.2%
1930	943	+0.2%
1950	748	−20.7%
1961	749	+0.1%
1970	699	−6.7%
1980	643	−8.0%
1991	585	−9.0%
2001	570	−2.6%
2011	520	−8.8%
2021	537	+3.3%
Source: Censuses
