= Karla Absolonová-Bufková =

Czech writer, ethnographer and folklorist (1855–1941)

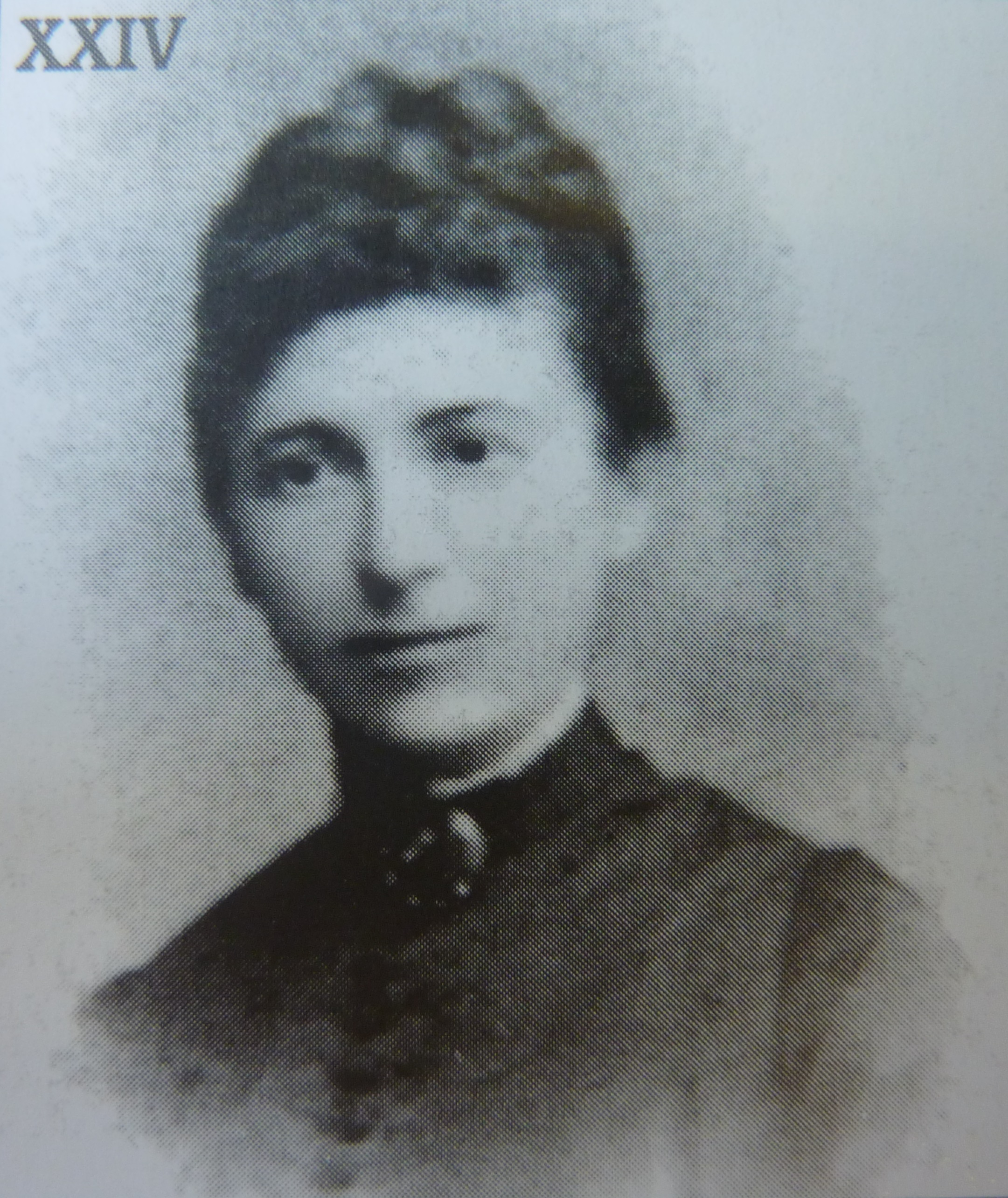
- Born: Karolina Anna Maximiliana Wankelová; 7 February 1855 Blansko, Moravia, Austrian Empire
- Died: 29 November 1941 (aged 86) Prague, Protectorate of Bohemia and Moravia
- Occupation: Writer; ethnographer; folklorist
- Language: Czech
- Notable works: Z Ječmínkovy říše: moravské povídky a pověsti (1897)
- Spouse: Vilibald Absolon (m. 1872; died 1882) Eduard Bufka (m. 1887)
- Children: 3, including Karel Absolon; Vladimír Jindřich Bufka
- Relatives: Jindřich Wankel (father); Lucie Bakešová (sister)

Karla Anna Maximiliana Absolonová-Bufková (née Wankelová; 7 February 1855 – 29 November 1941) was a Czech writer, ethnographer and folklorist. Absolonová-Bufková wrote children's books and plays, and collected Moravian customs, folktales, legends and Moravian folk music.

== Early life ==
Karolina Anna Maximiliana Wankelová was born on 7 February 1855 in Blansko, Moravia (present-day Czech Republic) to Jindřich Wankel and Eliška Wanklová (née Šímová). Absolonová-Bufková's father was a palaeontologist and archaeologist known as the "father of Moravian archaeology" and her mother was an ethnographer and national revivalist. The second of four sisters, Absolonová-Bufková was the younger sister of Lucie Bakešová, an ethnographer and social worker and was the older sister of Madlena Wanklová [cs], an ethnographer and feminist, and Vlasta Havelková, an ethnographer and curator.

Absolonová-Bufková attended municipal school in Blansko, before studying at The Higher Girls' School in Prague. When Absolonová-Bufková was a child, her father was a friend of the painter Josef Mánes. Mánes would stay with in the family home and painted a portrait of her dressed in national costume when she was aged 12.

== Career ==
Alongside writing children's books and plays, Absolonová-Bufková was an ethnographer and folklorist. She collected Moravian customs, folktales, legends and music and was particularly interested in the ornamentation of folk objects. She initially published articles about her work in women's magazines. She then published her collected Moravian legends in the book Z Ječmínkovy říše: moravské povídky a pověsti (1897), and recorded the legend of Býčí skála Cave. With her sisters, Absolonová-Bufková prepared ethnographic exhibitions in Olomouc (1885) and Prague (1895).

Absolonová-Bufková was a member of the Museum Association in Olomouc and the women's singing group the Academic Society Žerotín. She was also active in the women's movement with her sisters.

== Personal life ==
On 4 November 1872, Absolonová-Bufková married Vilibald Absolon (died 1882), a physician. Absolonová-Bufková and Absolon had two children Karel Absolon, a palaeontologist and naturalist and Olga Stránská-Absolonová, a writer and suffragist. The family lived in Boskovice, South Moravia.

In 1887, Absolonová-Bufková married Eduard Bufka, a clerk and banker. Absolonová-Bufková and Bufka had one son Vladimír Jindřich Bufka, a chemist and photographer.

Absolonová-Bufková died on 29 November 1941 in Prague aged 86.

== Select publications ==
- Z Ječmínkovy říše: moravské povídky a pověsti (1897)
- Po stopách slovanských na Rujáně (1900)
- Moravské pověsti a pohádky zejména z Krasu moravského (1920)
- Tulák: drama ve čtyřech jednáních (1925)
