= Předmostí 3 =

Hominin fossil

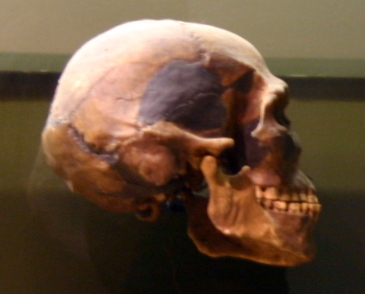
- Cast of Předmostí 3 skull
- Common name: Předmostí 3
- Species: Human
- Age: 26,000 years
- Place discovered: Přerov, Czechoslovakia
- Date discovered: 1982

Předmostí 3 was an Upper Paleolithic Homo sapiens from what is today the Czech Republic, geologically dated to the Late Pleistocene.

== Description ==
It was found in Předmostí u Přerova, Přerov, and dated to 26,000 B.P. and has a cranial capacity of 1580 cubic centimetres (Holloway 2000;Holloway et al 2004)

== Fate ==
The specimen was destroyed in 1945 in the Second World War as retreating German troops set fire to Mikulov Castle where the remains were stored.

== Analysis ==
In a morphometric analysis of cranio-facial traits compared to modern humans, Předmostí 3 was found to correlate to a 73% similarity.

Upper Paleolithic skulls are at least as flat-faced as modern ones, except for Predmosti 3

The skull belongs to a morphological Upper Palaeolithic group that also includes Grotte des Enfants 4, Barma Grande 5, Pavlov 1 and Sunghir 1. Předmostí 3 had a retromolar space, which is absent from most modern humans. Předmostí 3's hand is similar to that of the Middle Paleolithic Skhul IV.
