= Žerůtky (Blansko District) =

- Municipality
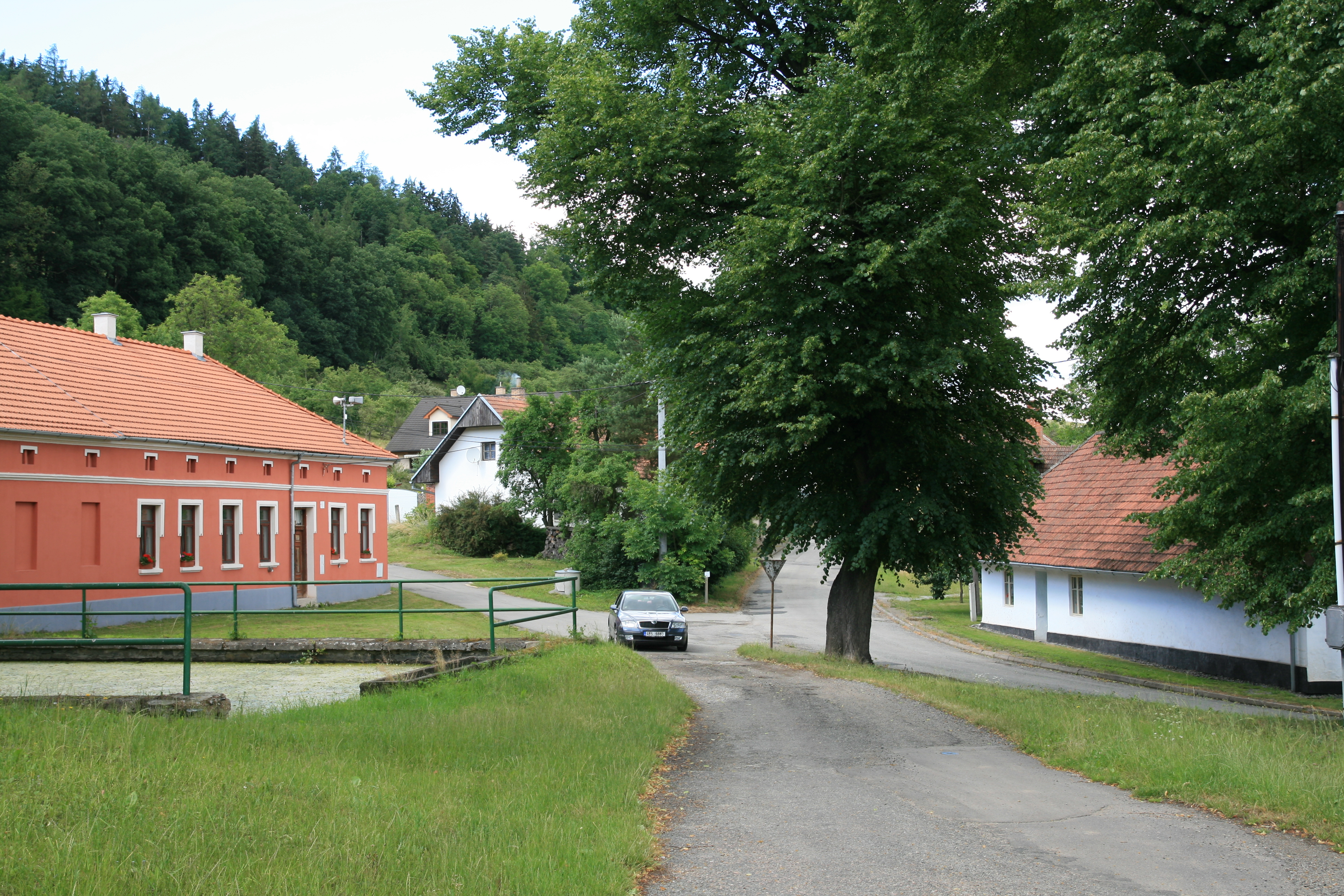
- Centre of Žerůtky

- Location in the Czech Republic
- Coordinates: 49°26′25″N 16°32′12″E
- Country: Czech Republic
- Region: South Moravian
- District: Blansko
- First mentioned: 1353

Area
  - Total: 2.97 km^{2} (1.15 sq mi)
- Elevation: 370 m (1,210 ft)

Population (2026-01-01)
  - Total: 79
  - Density: 27/km^{2} (69/sq mi)
- Time zone: UTC+1 (CET)
  - Summer (DST): UTC+2 (CEST)
- Postal code: 679 71
- Website: www.obeczerutky.cz

Žerůtky is a municipality and village in Blansko District in the South Moravian Region of the Czech Republic. It has about 80 inhabitants.

Žerůtky lies approximately 12 kilometres (7 mi) north-west of Blansko, 28 km (17 mi) north of Brno, and 168 km (104 mi) south-east of Prague.

== Demographics ==
Historical population
| Year | Pop. | ±% |
|---|---|---|
| 1869 | 203 | — |
| 1880 | 195 | −3.9% |
| 1890 | 224 | +14.9% |
| 1900 | 206 | −8.0% |
| 1910 | 169 | −18.0% |
| 1921 | 180 | +6.5% |
| 1930 | 147 | −18.3% |
| 1950 | 135 | −8.2% |
| 1961 | 119 | −11.9% |
| 1970 | 109 | −8.4% |
| 1980 | 83 | −23.9% |
| 1991 | 56 | −32.5% |
| 2001 | 65 | +16.1% |
| 2011 | 56 | −13.8% |
| 2021 | 81 | +44.6% |
Source: Censuses
