= Jindřich Wankel =

Bohemian paleontologist (1821–1897)

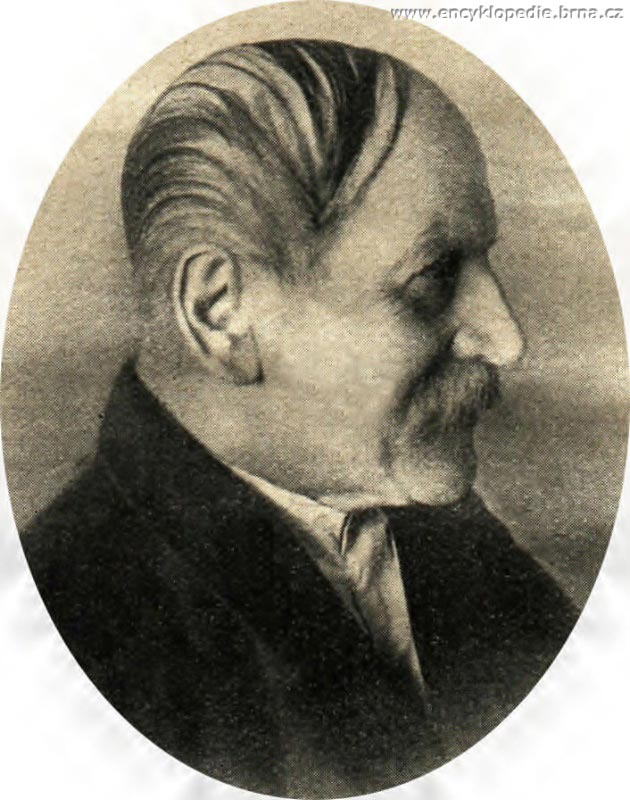
Heinrich Wankel

Jindřich Wankel (German: Heinrich Wankel; 15 July 1821, Prague – 5 April 1897, Olomouc) was a Bohemian palaeontologist and archaeologist.

== Family ==
Wankel was born on 15 July 1821 to Damian Wankel, a clerk, and his wife Magdalena, née Schwarz, in a bilingual environment. He attended German schools in Prague and later studied medicine at the University of Prague as a student of Josef Hyrtl.

Wankel married Eliška Šímová [cs] and they had four daughters together:

- Lucie Bakešová (1853–1935)
- Karla Absolonová-Bufková (1855–1941)
- Vlasta Havelková (1857–1939)
- Madlena Wanklová [cs] (1865–1922)

Wankel's grandson Karel Absolon was also a famous archaeologist and worked in the same area. Another grandson was photographer Vladimír Jindřich Bufka.

== Career ==
He came to work in the area of the Moravský kras (Moravian Karst, today's Czech Republic) in 1847, and from 1849 lived in Blansko as a medical doctor. He started geological exploration of the area and later carried out palaeontological, archaeological, and anthropological research.

In 1850, in Blansko, he set up the first ever laboratory to research fossil bones from the Cenozoic Era where he assembled a complete skeleton of a cave bear (until then, such bones were used for spodium in the nearby sugar refinery. His most famous discovery (1872) was the burial site of a nobleman from the Bronze Age at the Býčí skála cave, with skeletons of 40 ritually killed young women.

== Works (selection) ==
- Der Menschenknochenfund in der Býčískálahöhle ("The human bones found in the Býčí skála Cave") (Vienna 1871)
- Prähistorische Eisenschmelz- und Schmiedestätten in Mähren ("Prehistoric iron smelting and forging facilities in Moravia") (Vienna 1879)
- Bilder aus der Mährischen Schweiz und ihrer Vergangenheit ("Images from the Moravian Switzerland and their past") (Vienna 1882)
- Beitrag zur Geschichte der Slaven in Europa ("Contribution to the history of the Slavs in Europe") (Olomouc 1885)
