= Okrouhlá (Blansko District) =

- Municipality
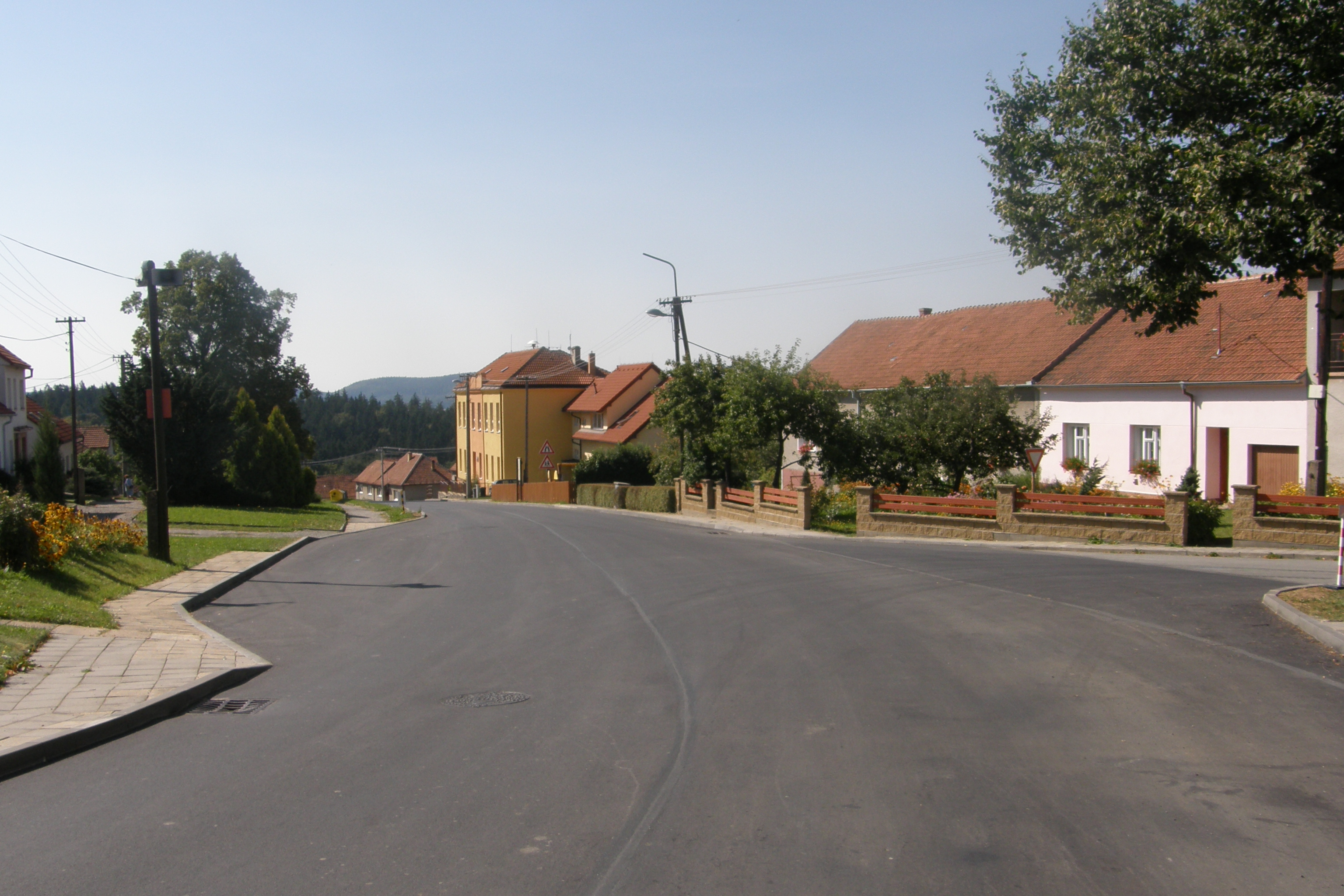
- Lower part of Okrouhlá

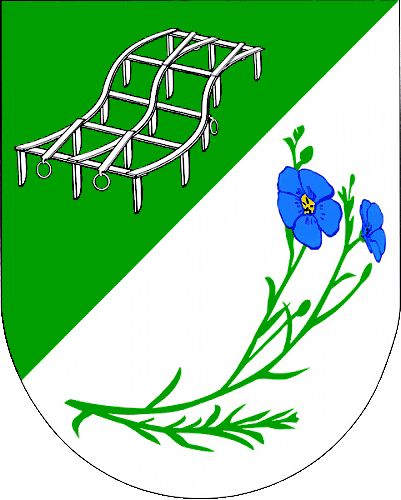
- Flag Coat of arms

- Location in the Czech Republic
- Coordinates: 49°30′27″N 16°43′55″E
- Country: Czech Republic
- Region: South Moravian
- District: Blansko
- First mentioned: 1447

Area
  - Total: 6.69 km^{2} (2.58 sq mi)
- Elevation: 597 m (1,959 ft)

Population (2026-01-01)
  - Total: 613
  - Density: 91.6/km^{2} (237/sq mi)
- Time zone: UTC+1 (CET)
  - Summer (DST): UTC+2 (CEST)
- Postal code: 680 01
- Website: www.okrouhla.cz

Okrouhlá is a municipality and village in Blansko District in the South Moravian Region of the Czech Republic. It has about 600 inhabitants.

Okrouhlá lies approximately 17 kilometres (11 mi) north of Blansko, 36 km (22 mi) north of Brno, and 179 km (111 mi) east of Prague.

== Demographics ==
Historical population
Year	Pop.	±%
1869	561	—
1880	567	+1.1%
1890	544	−4.1%
1900	607	+11.6%
1910	611	+0.7%
1921	598	−2.1%
1930	572	−4.3%
1950	608	+6.3%
1961	647	+6.4%
1970	563	−13.0%
1980	511	−9.2%
1991	522	+2.2%
2001	528	+1.1%
2011	529	+0.2%
2021	580	+9.6%
Source: Censuses
