= Františka Xavera Běhálková =

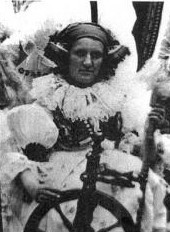
- Born: 23 October 1853; Tovačov
- Died: 28 April 1907 (aged 53); Tovačov
- Known for: Czech collector of folklore

Františka Xavera Běhálková (23 October 1853 – 28 April 1907) was an Austria-Hungary Czech collector of Moravian folk music.

== Life ==
Běhálková was born in Tovačov in 1853. She and her orphaned siblings had their uncle as their guardian when they were growing up. He was a priest and he arranged her education. She was close to the sisters Anna and Zdenka Braunerová and they encouraged her to take an interest in Haná folk culture. Zdenka Braunerová was a noted painter and through her she gained access to intellectual society. By 1884 she had made links with Vlasta Havelková and Jan Havelka and their newly formed Patriotic Museum Association in Olomouc. On New Years Day 1885 she had an exhibition of Moravian folk embroidery.

She was an ethnographer and in her home town she taught dance. She gathered together dances and tunes from her local region. She was a collaborator with the composer Leoš Janáček. He was a collector of folk songs as well as a leading Czech composer. The tunes he used were recorded by him in 1895 to 1888 but a second source was Běhálková who sent him 70 to 100 tunes that she had gathered from around the Haná region of central Morovia.

In 1891 to 1893 she, Janáček and Lucie Bakešová published "National Dances in Moravia". The work covered three small books and it contained 21 dances.

Běhálková died of cancer in Tovačov on 28 April 1907.
