= Žerůtky (Znojmo District) =

- Municipality
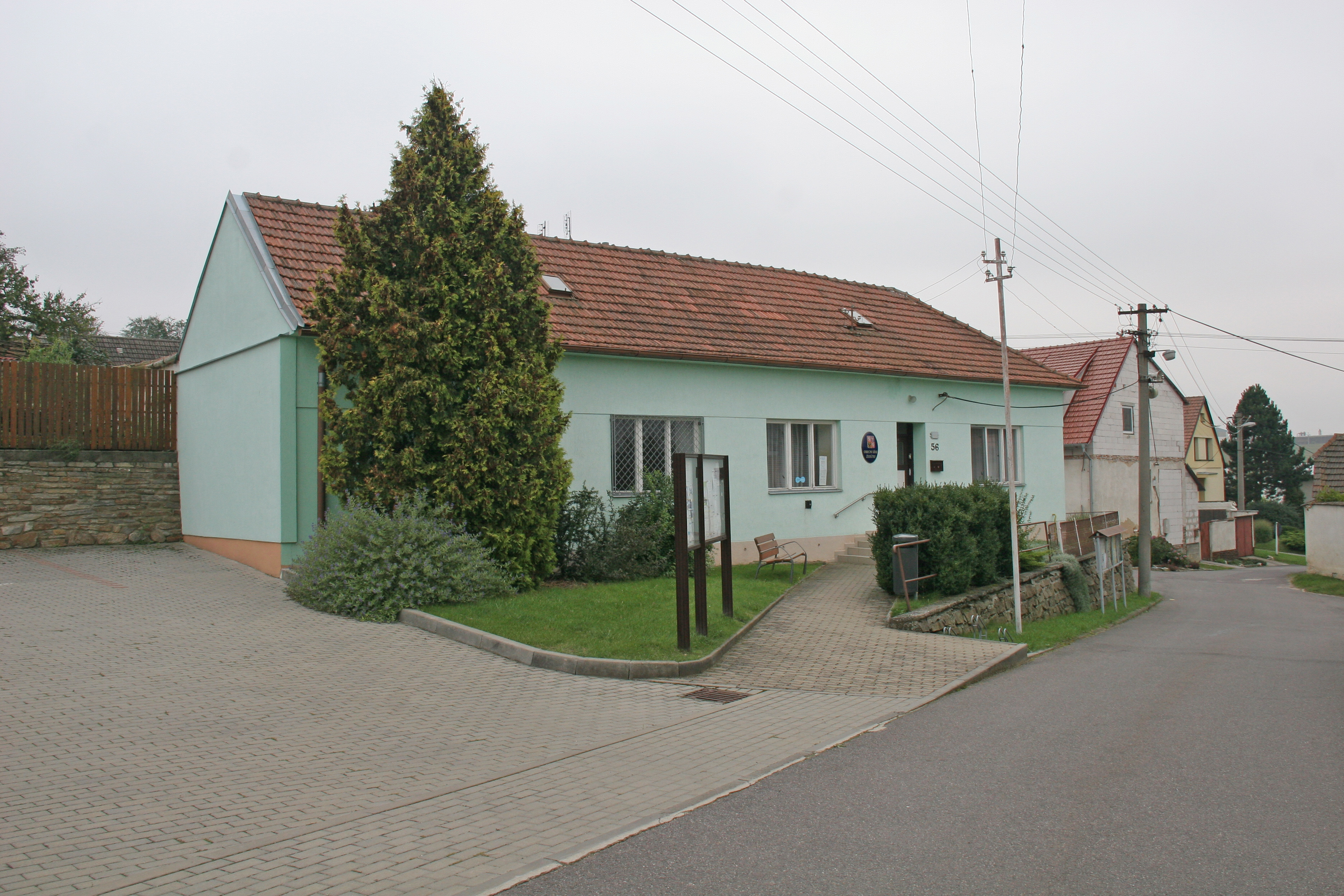
- Municipal office

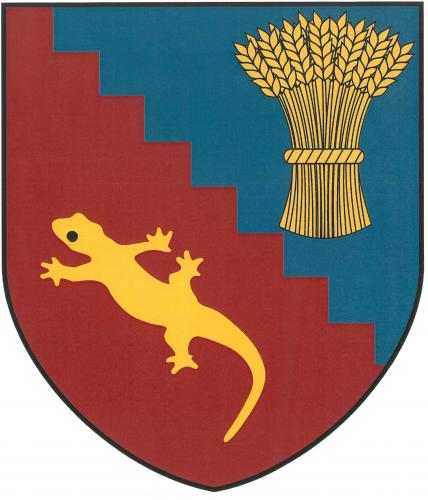
- Flag Coat of arms

- Location in the Czech Republic
- Coordinates: 48°54′21″N 15°57′47″E
- Country: Czech Republic
- Region: South Moravian
- District: Znojmo
- First mentioned: 1353

Area
  - Total: 2.19 km^{2} (0.85 sq mi)
- Elevation: 380 m (1,250 ft)

Population (2026-01-01)
  - Total: 283
  - Density: 129/km^{2} (335/sq mi)
- Time zone: UTC+1 (CET)
  - Summer (DST): UTC+2 (CEST)
- Postal code: 671 51
- Website: www.obec-zerutky.cz

Žerůtky is a municipality and village in Znojmo District in the South Moravian Region of the Czech Republic. It has about 300 inhabitants.

Žerůtky lies approximately 9 kilometres (6 mi) north-west of Znojmo, 58 km (36 mi) south-west of Brno, and 172 km (107 mi) south-east of Prague.

== Demographics ==
Historical population
Year	Pop.	±%
1869	241	—
1880	234	−2.9%
1890	282	+20.5%
1900	299	+6.0%
1910	284	−5.0%
1921	269	−5.3%
1930	290	+7.8%
1950	293	+1.0%
1961	339	+15.7%
1970	358	+5.6%
1980	257	−28.2%
1991	232	−9.7%
2001	255	+9.9%
2011	236	−7.5%
2021	263	+11.4%
Source: Censuses
