= Spodium =

Ash used medically in ancient Greece

Spodium, (Latin for ashes or soot) refers to burned bone (usually used for medical purposes), or the act of divination with ash. Multiple substances have had this name, including a crude sublimated preparation of zinc oxide, calcined bones, and the ash of burned cane plants.

Spodium may also refer to other types of ash, such as the scrapings from the inside of a furnace. It is possible that it, at least at one point in history, was a form of ivory ash.

Spodium has a long history of medical usage, mentioned by Hippocrates and, for example, in the Medical Poem of Salerno "...Who knows the cause why Spodium stancheth bleeding?..." (in this case spodium referring to oxen bone ashes).
