= Náprstek Museum =

Art museum in Prague

- Náprstkovo muzeum
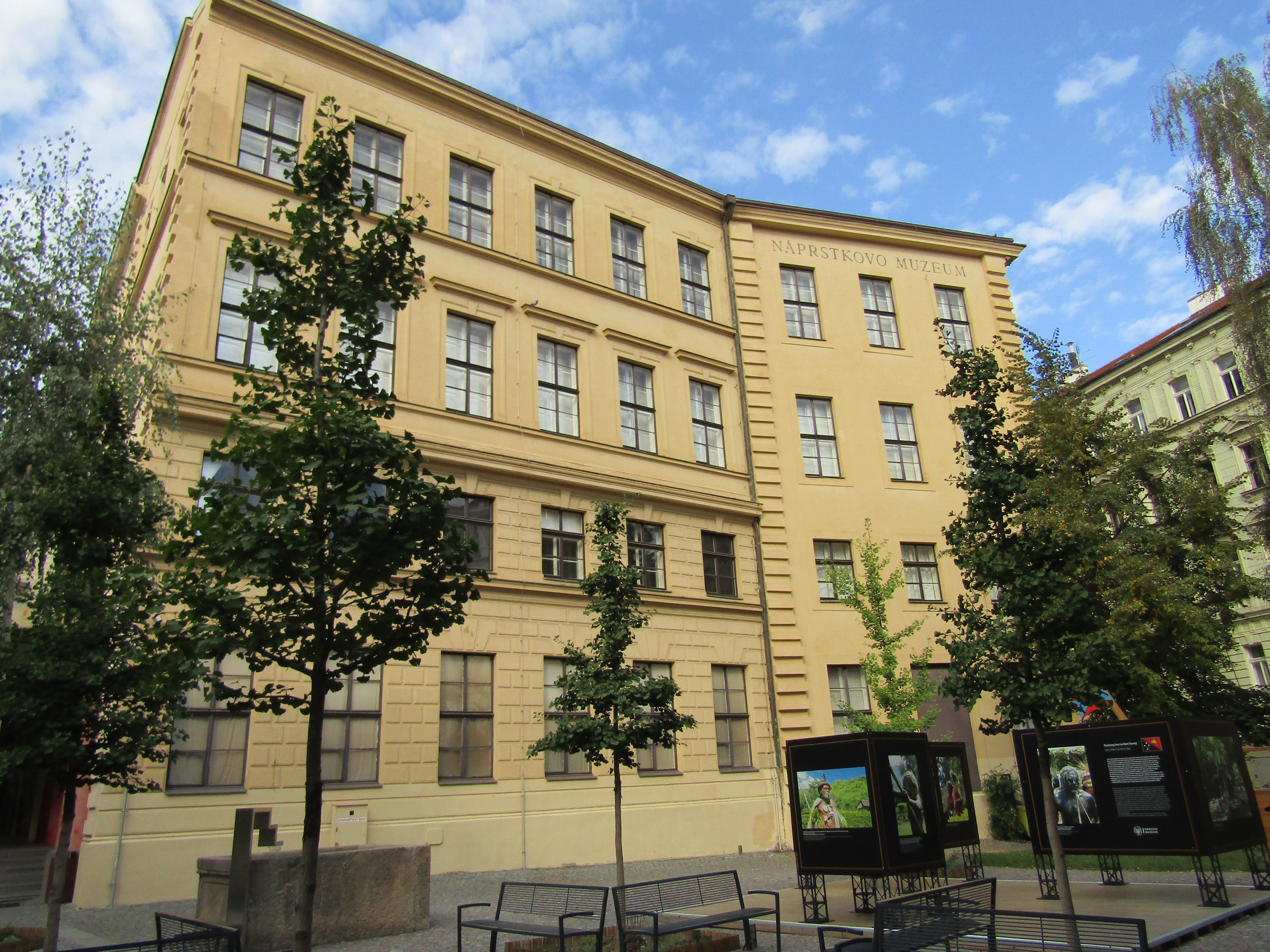
- Main Building of Náprstek Museum
- Interactive fullscreen map
- Established: 1874; 152 years ago
- Location: Betlémské náměstí 1, Prague 1, Czech Republic, 110 00
- Coordinates: 50°05′02.58″N 14°24′59.20″E
- Website: https://www.nm.cz/naprstkovo-muzeum-asijskych-africkych-a-americkych-kultur#novinky

The Náprstek Museum (Czech: Náprstkovo muzeum) is a museum of Asian, African and Native American art located in Bethlehem Square (Czech: Betlemske namesti) in Prague, Czech Republic. It is one of several permanent exhibitions of the National Museum. The museum is situated in the former brewing and wine-making compound of U Halanku in the Prague Old Town.

== History ==
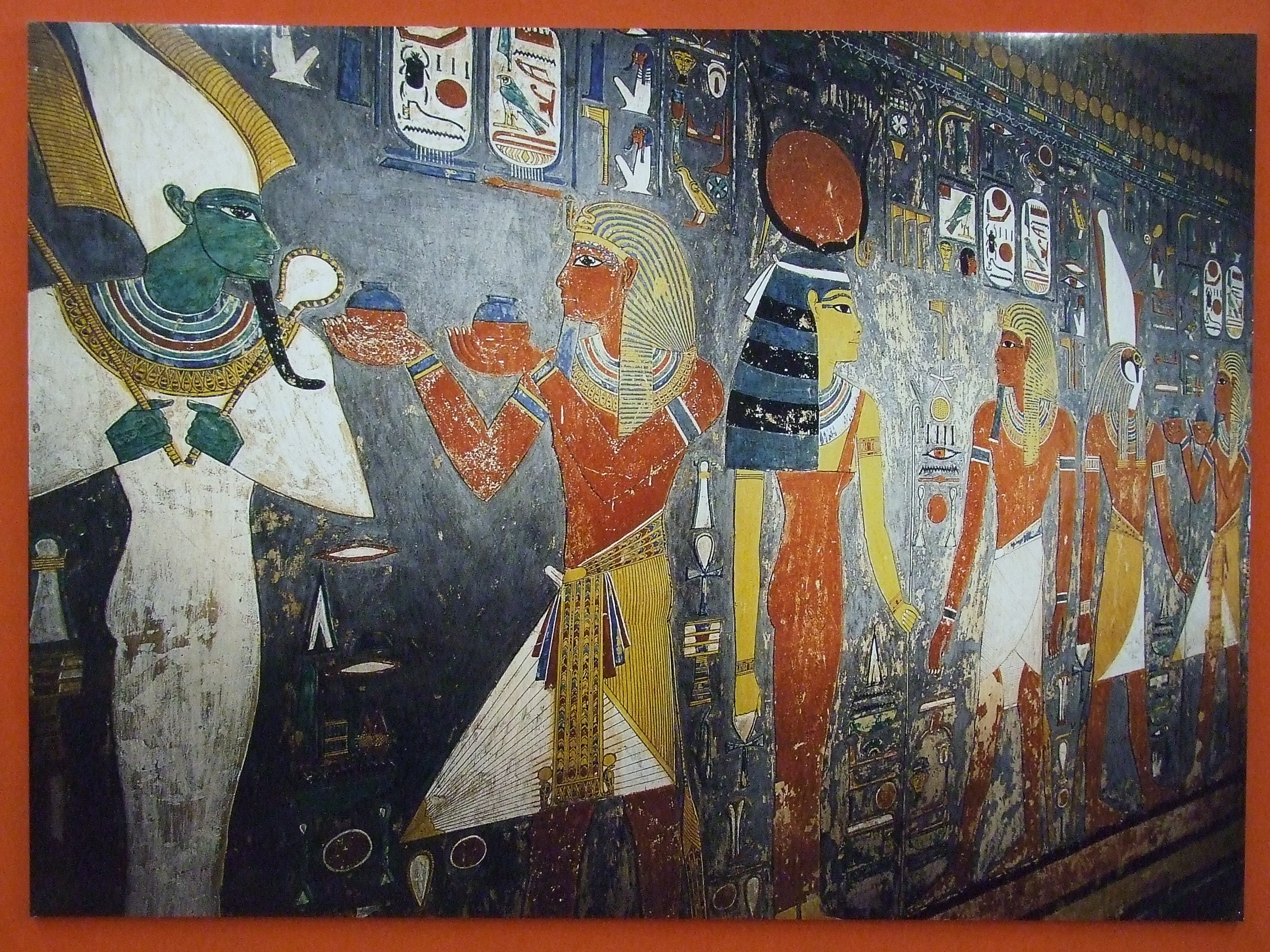
Egyptian exhibition in Náprstek Museum

The museum, originally private, was founded in 1874 by Czech national revivalist politician Vojtěch Náprstek in his former family brewery, as the Czech Industrial Museum. After his death the museum became the Ethnographic Museum, and since World War II it has been focused on non-European cultures.

In the 19th century the museum was one of the cultural and educational centres of the Czech intelligentsia. Much of its collection comes from Náprstek and his friends who were Czech expatriates, travellers and ethnographers. Only a part of the museum's large collection is available to the public.

== Gallery ==
Courtyard of the U Halánků house, before 1870

In front of the U Halánků distillery, before 1905
