= Karel Absolon =

Czech geographer (1877–1960)

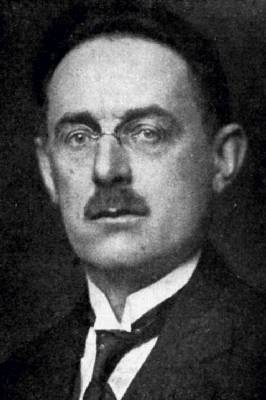
- Karel Absolon
- Born: 16 June 1877; Boskovice, Austria-Hungary
- Died: 6 October 1960 (aged 83); Brno, Czechoslovakia
- Scientific career
- Fields: Paleontology

Karel Absolon (16 June 1877 – 6 October 1960) was a Czech archaeologist, geographer, paleontologist, and speleologist. He was born in Boskovice.

Absolon was the grandchild of paleontologist Jindřich Wankel and the son of Karla Absolonová-Bufková. During his studies at Charles University in Prague he started with speleological research in the caves of Moravský kras (Moravian Karst) in the Moravia of what is now the Czech Republic. In 1907 he became the custodian of the Moravian museum in Brno and a professor of paleoanthropology at the Charles University in Prague in 1926.

His most known works are the paleoanthropologic discoveries at Dolní Věstonice which include a Venus figurine. He worked on the systemic mapping of the Moravský kras, including the Macocha Abyss and the Pekárna, Punkevní and Kateřinská caves. He also explored karstic caves in the Balkans, France, and England. Absolon was very skilled in promoting himself and in popularizing his discoveries as a way to lure sponsors.

Absolon died on 6 October 1960 in Brno. In 1961 a cave on the foot of Mt. Maggiore in the Italian Apuan Alps was discovered and named after Absolon.

== See also ==
- Venus of Dolní Věstonice
