= Blansko =

Town in the Czech Republic

- Town
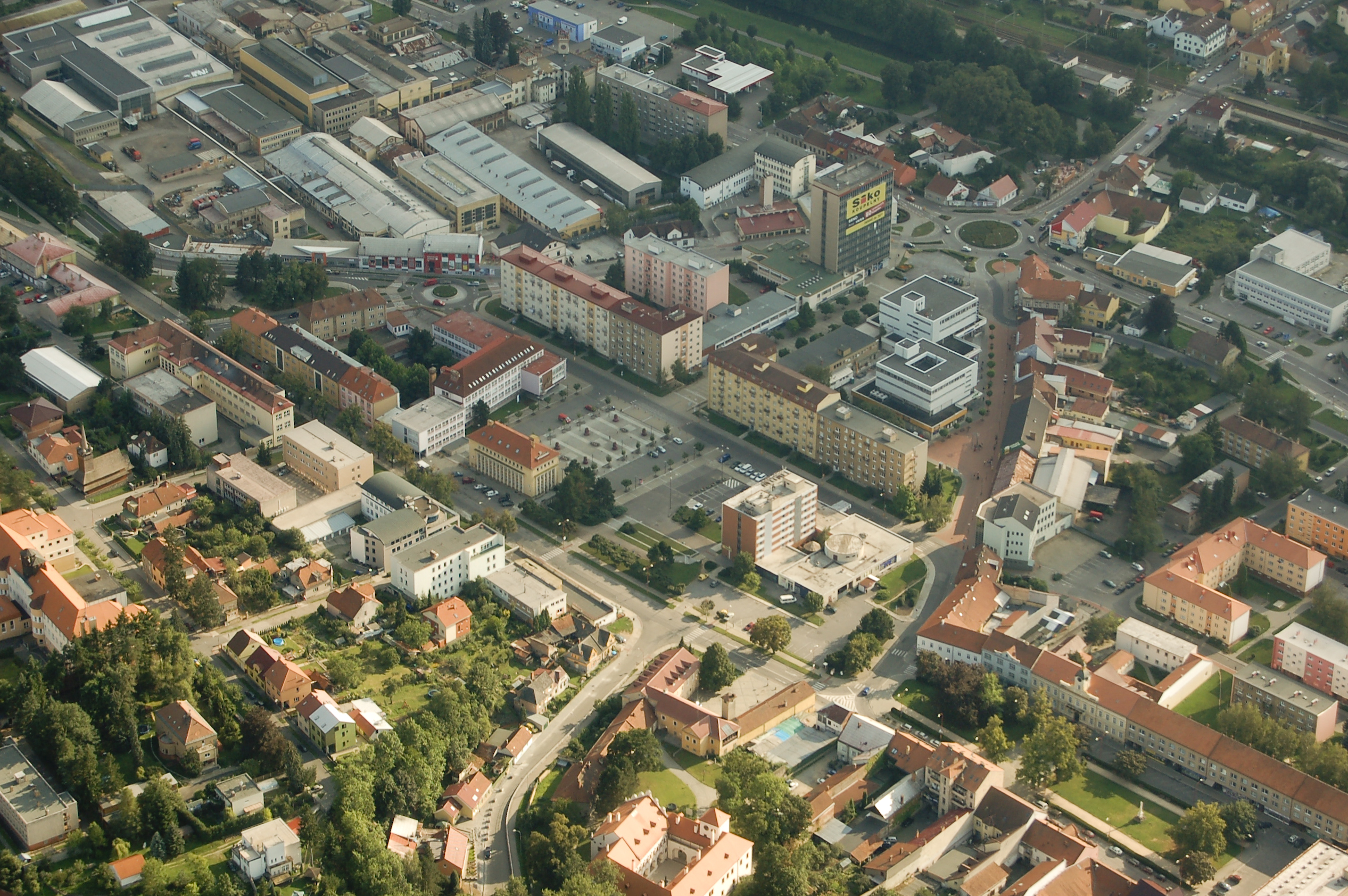
- Aerial view of the town centre

- Flag Coat of arms

- Location in the Czech Republic
- Coordinates: 49°21′47″N 16°38′35″E
- Country: Czech Republic
- Region: South Moravian
- District: Blansko
- First mentioned: 1136

Government
  - Mayor: Jiří Crha (ODS)

Area
  - Total: 44.97 km^{2} (17.36 sq mi)
- Elevation: 276 m (906 ft)

Population (2026-01-01)
  - Total: 19,900
  - Density: 443/km^{2} (1,150/sq mi)
- Time zone: UTC+1 (CET)
  - Summer (DST): UTC+2 (CEST)
- Postal code: 678 01
- Website: www.blansko.cz

Blansko (Czech pronunciation: [ˈblansko]; German: Blanz) is a town in the South Moravian Region of the Czech Republic. It has about 20,000 inhabitants. The town is located on the Svitava River, on the border of the Moravian Karst Protected Landscape Area. It is mainly an industrial town.

Blansko was a market town from the 16th century and became a town only in 1905. The town experienced its greatest growth in the second half of the 20th century thanks to the development of the engineering industry.

== Administrative division ==
Blansko consists of 12 municipal parts (in brackets population according to the 2021 census):

- Blansko (16,429)
- Češkovice (385)
- Dolní Lhota (565)
- Horní Lhota (435)
- Hořice (115)
- Klepačov (615)
- Lažánky (417)
- Obůrka (213)
- Olešná (183)
- Skalní mlýn (5)
- Těchov (470)
- Žižlavice (68)

== Etymology ==
The name is derived from the Old Czech word blana (i.e. 'wet meadows') and the adjective blanský.

== Geography ==
Blansko is located about 16 kilometres (10 mi) north of Brno. It lies in the Drahany Highlands. The highest point is the hill Bukovec at 596 m (1,955 ft) above sea level. It is situated in the valley of the Svitava River; the majority of the town is situated on a slope above the left bank of the Svitava. The eastern part of the municipal territory lies in the Moravian Karst Protected Landscape Area.

== History ==
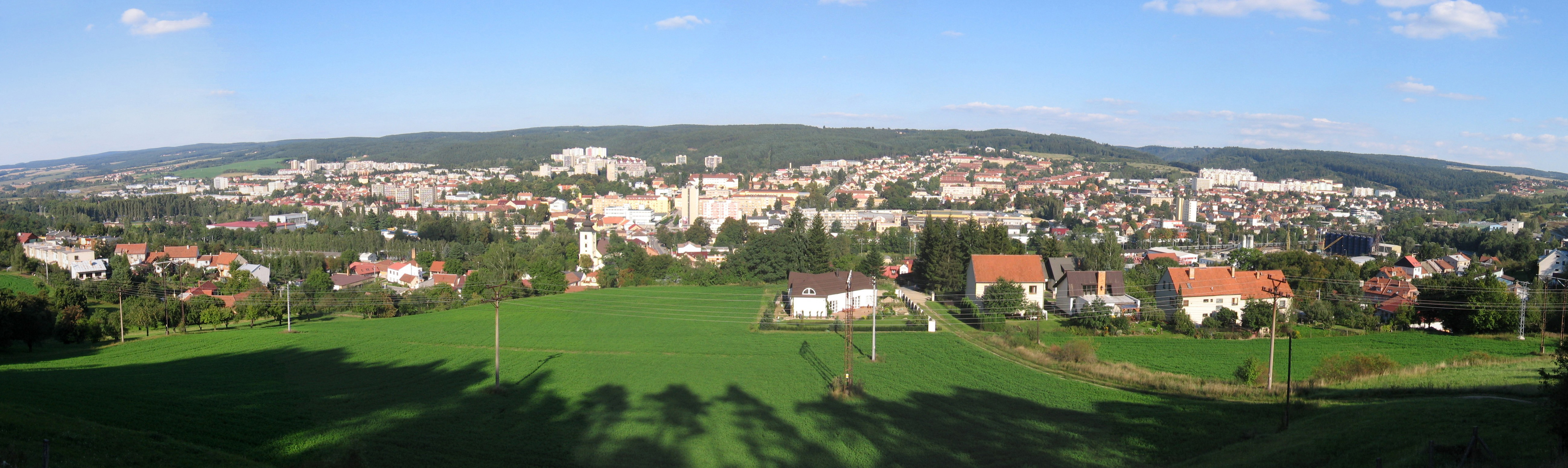
General view

Blansko was originally founded as a settlement on the right bank of the Svitava River, today the local part called Staré Blansko ("Old Blansko"). It was located on an important trade route from Bohemia to the regions around Danube. The first written mention of Blansko is from 1136. It was the site of dispute between Jindřich Zdík, the bishop of Olomouc, and Prince Wratislaus of Brno regarding the rights to construct a church in the village.

From the end of the 14th century, a new settlement began to grow on the left bank, known as Nové Blansko ('new Blansko'), which later became the core of the modern town. Both parts developed administratively and economically independently until 1526, when they merged. In the late 16th century during the rule of the Žalkovský of Žalkovice family, Blansko was promoted to a market town. The family had rebuild the local Gothic fortress into a Renaissance residence.

From 1698 the Gellhorn family owned the estate and founded here the first foundry and ironworks. In 1766, Blansko was bought by the Salm-Reifferscheidt family. They owned it until 1945. In the first half of the 19th century, the ironworks prospered and developed and the expansion of the production of artistic cast iron occurred. In 1849, the railway from Brno to Česká Třebová was opened. In 1905, Franz Joseph I of Austria granted Blansko the status of the town.

In 1949, Blansko became the capital of Blansko District instead of Boskovice. From the 1960s to the 1980s, the town became the centre of the engineering industry and the population grew rapidly. As a result of new construction, most of the historic buildings disappeared.

== Demographics ==
Historical population

Year	Pop.	±%
1869	5,002	—
1880	5,565	+11.3%
1890	5,545	−0.4%
1900	6,278	+13.2%
1910	7,562	+20.5%

Year	Pop.	±%
1921	7,544	−0.2%
1930	8,496	+12.6%
1950	8,883	+4.6%
1961	12,673	+42.7%
1970	14,903	+17.6%

Year	Pop.	±%
1980	18,912	+26.9%
1991	20,783	+9.9%
2001	20,594	−0.9%
2011	20,629	+0.2%
2021	19,900	−3.5%

Source: Censuses

== Economy ==
The largest industrial employers based in the town are Pyrotek CZ (aluminium processor), ČKD Blansko (manufacturing of hydro machines, heavy-duty machining tools and mechanical engineering metallurgy, founded in 1950), and a branch of Synthon (producer of generic drugs).

The longest tradition has the still operating company Metra Blansko (manufacturer of electric measurement devices), which was founded in 1911.

== Transport ==
There are no major roads passing through the municipal territory. There are two second class roads, II/379 (Tišnov–Vyškov) and II/374 (Blansko–Jevíčko).

Blansko is located on the railway line Prague–Brno.

== Sport ==
The town's football club is FK Blansko. The club participated in the 2020–21 season of the Czech National Football League, but was immediately relegated.

== Sights ==
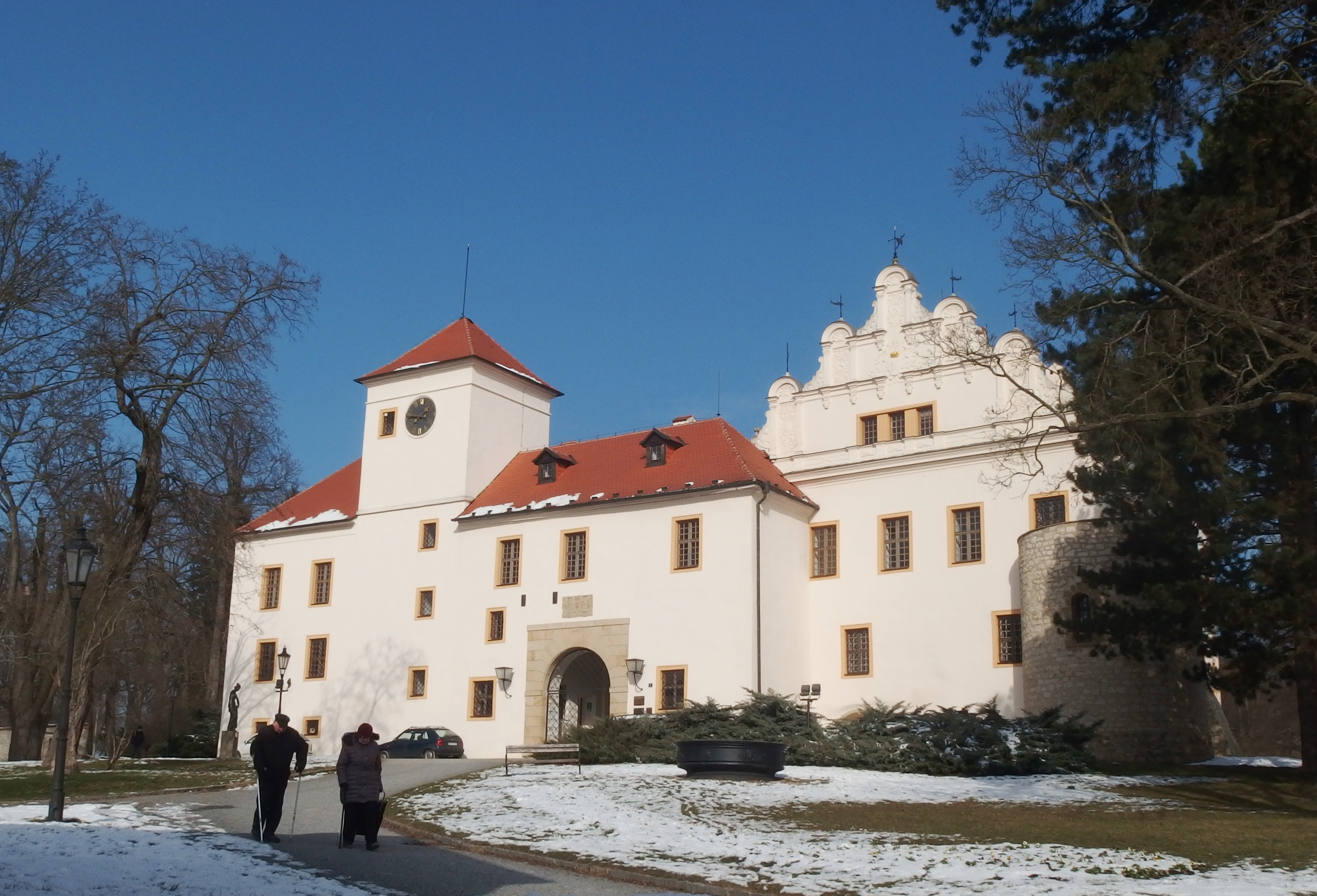
Blansko Castle

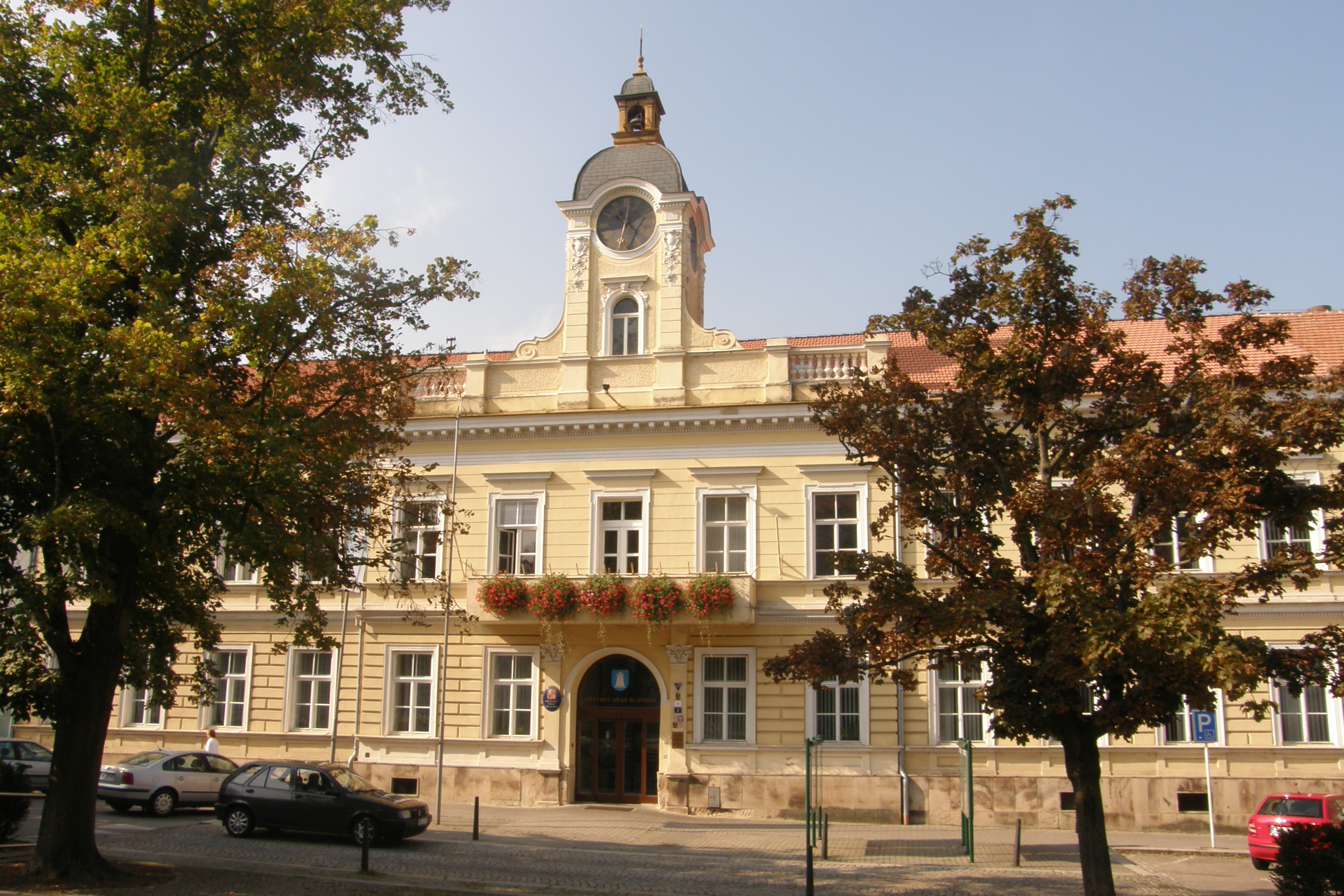
Town hall

The main sight is the Blansko Castle. The Renaissance castle was built in 1604–1605 by reconstruction of a Gothic fortress from the 14th century. Today it houses the Blansko Region Museum with exhibitions of Moravian Karst and its exploration, the tradition of the iron industry in Blansko and the production of artistic castings.

The Church of Saint Martin was built in 1672–1691. It replaced an original Romanesque and later Gothic church from the 12th century. In 1707–1708, the church was reconstructed and a new tower was added. The tower is open to the public and serves as a lookout tower. The church has one of the oldest bell still extant in Moravia.

The wooden Church of Saint Paraskieva was built in Carpathian Ruthenia in 1601–1641 and brought to Blansko in 1936. It is the oldest church of the Ruthenian Gothic type in the country.

The Klamovka Ironworks is the last preserved foundry and ironworks from the 1850s. It is a typical example of the industrial architecture of the mid-19th century.

The town hall from 1885 replaced an old wooden structure with a tower which originated from the 16th century. In 1904, the clock tower was completed.

== Notable people ==
- Carl Reichenbach (1788–1869), chemist and metallurgist; invented paraffin wax in Blansko
- Jindřich Wankel (1821–1897), archaeologist and speleologist; lived and worked here
- Lucie Bakešová (1853–1935), folklorist and social activist
- Karla Absolonová-Bufková (1855–1941), writer and folklorist
- Vlasta Havelková (1857–1939), ethnographer, archaeologist and folklorist
- Ludvík Daněk (1937–1998), discus thrower, Olympic champion
- Pavel Řezníček (1942–2018), writer and poet
- Karel Jarůšek (born 1952), football player and manager
- Roman Meluzín (born 1972), ice hockey player
- Filip Král (born 1999), ice hockey player

== Twin towns – sister cities ==
Blansko is twinned with:

- Komárno, Slovakia
- Legnica, Poland
- Mürzzuschlag, Austria
- Scandiano, Italy
