= Amatérská Cave =

Cave and archaeological site in the Czech Republic

- Amatérská jeskyně
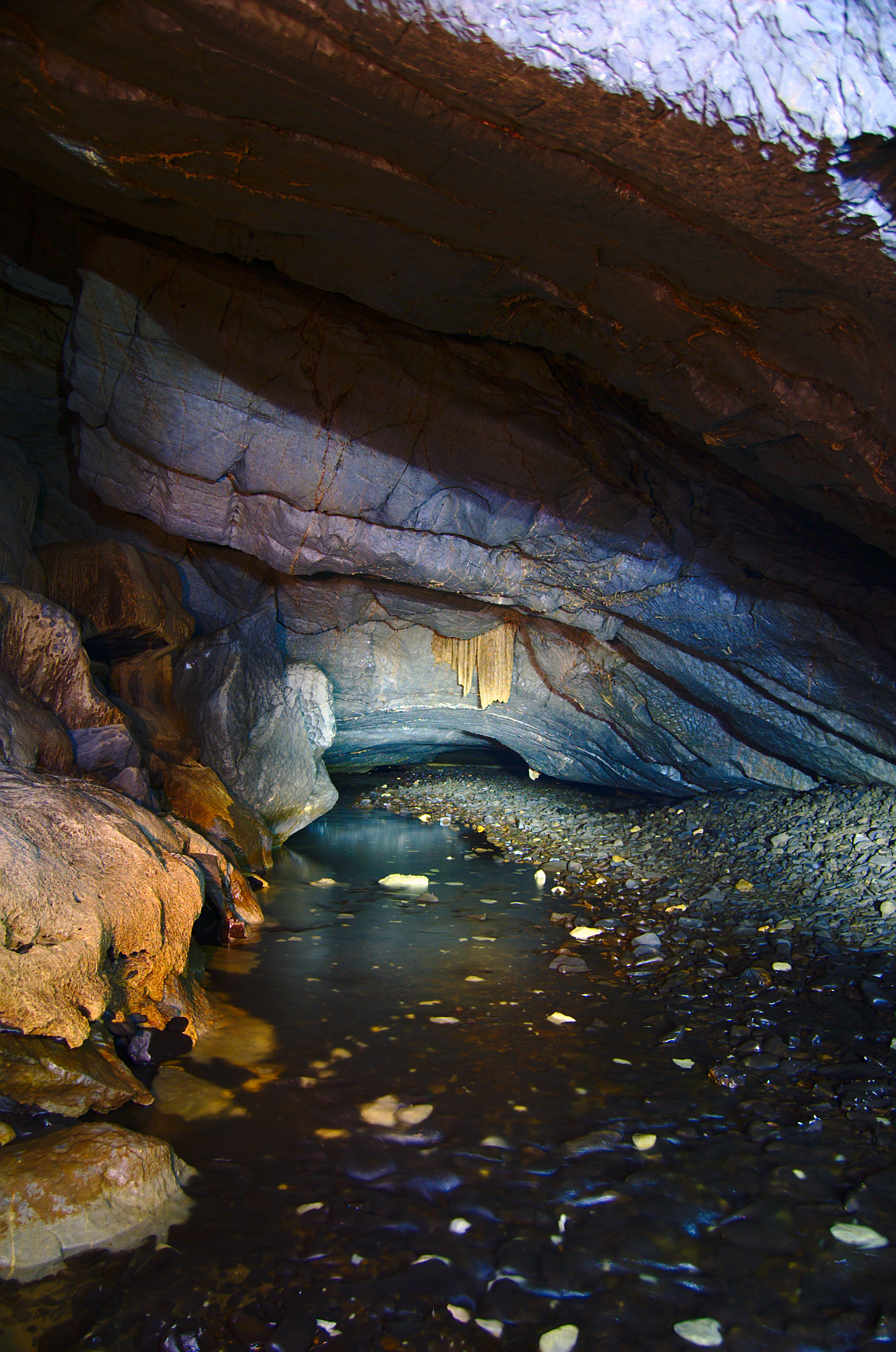
- Space inside with Bílá voda stream

- Location within Czech Republic
- Location: Sloup, Šošůvka, Vilémovice, Ostrov Moravia, Czech Republic
- Coordinates: 49°23′13″N 16°44′43″E
- Depth: 110 m (360 ft)
- Length: 40,000 m (130,000 ft)
- Discovery: 1723 resp. 1969 (main part)
- Geology: Devonian limestone
- Entrances: 508 (old), 393 (new, artificial)
- Access: by foot
- Registry: Cave E-Cadastre

Amatérská Cave (in Czech Amatérská jeskyně, in English Amateurs Cave, not used) is part of the longest cave system in Moravia, Czech Republic. It is also famous for archaeological discoveries. Except for the entrance, the cave is not accessible to the public, although occasionally it is opened for visitors.

The cave is located in the northern part of the Moravian Karst, between the town of Sloup and the village of Ostrov. Amatérská Cave is the longest cave system in the Czech Republic with a length of over 40 km-40,070 m (131,460 ft).

The cave system is bound on two main underground streames: Bila voda and Sloupsky potok, (in underground) creating the River Punkva inside Amatérská Cave. The whole system is created by the connection of (semi) separate caves: Nová Rasovna, Pikova Dama, Spiralka, 13C, Amaterska Cave, the Sloupsko-sosuvske Caves, the Punkevni Caves and Macocha Abbys.

== Description of underground system ==
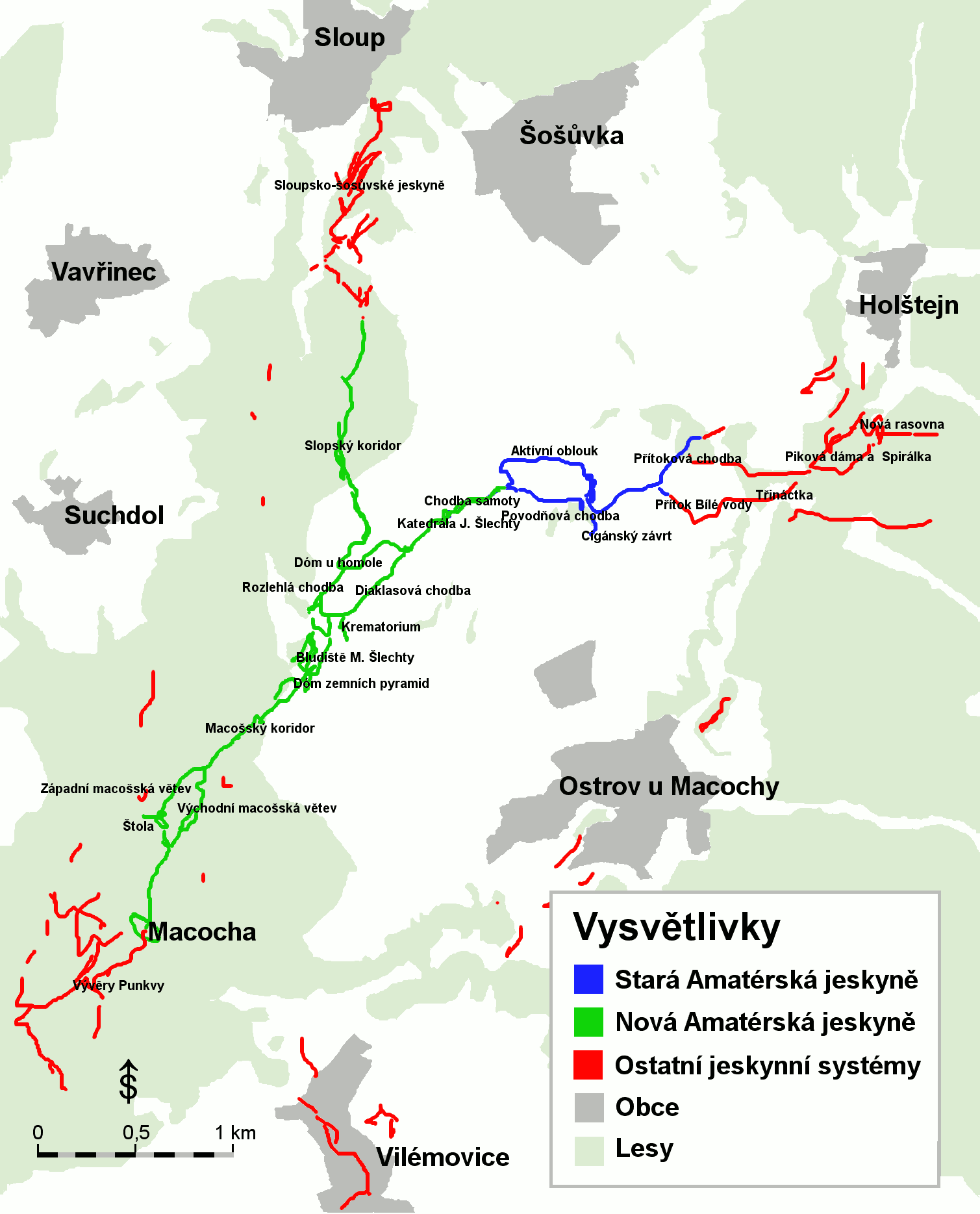
Scheme (map) of Amatérská Cave system

Amatérská Cave is the connection between the water sinks of Sloupský Potok and Bila Voda and the water resurgence of the Punkva River, which is created inside Amatérská Cave by a connection of both main water streams. The cave itself is characterised by extensive tunnel passages with varying amounts of fluvial deposits and screes. The passages sometimes change into big domes.

Those passages represent a higher cave level of about 20 m above the lower cave level where the rivers are still active. In some parts of the cave (Sloupsky Corridor, Labyrint of Milan Slechta), even more such cave levels can be found. The lowest part of the system is always under water and its exploration can only be done by using cave diving techniques.

Amaterska Cave can be divided into 3 main parts: Sloupsky Corridor, Bila voda branch together with Old Amaterska cave and Macossky Corridor. Amatérská Cave can be entered by one natural entrance in Cikansky Sink Hole or through an artificial one under Konsky Spad in Pusty Zleb canyon.

== History of discovery and of explorations ==
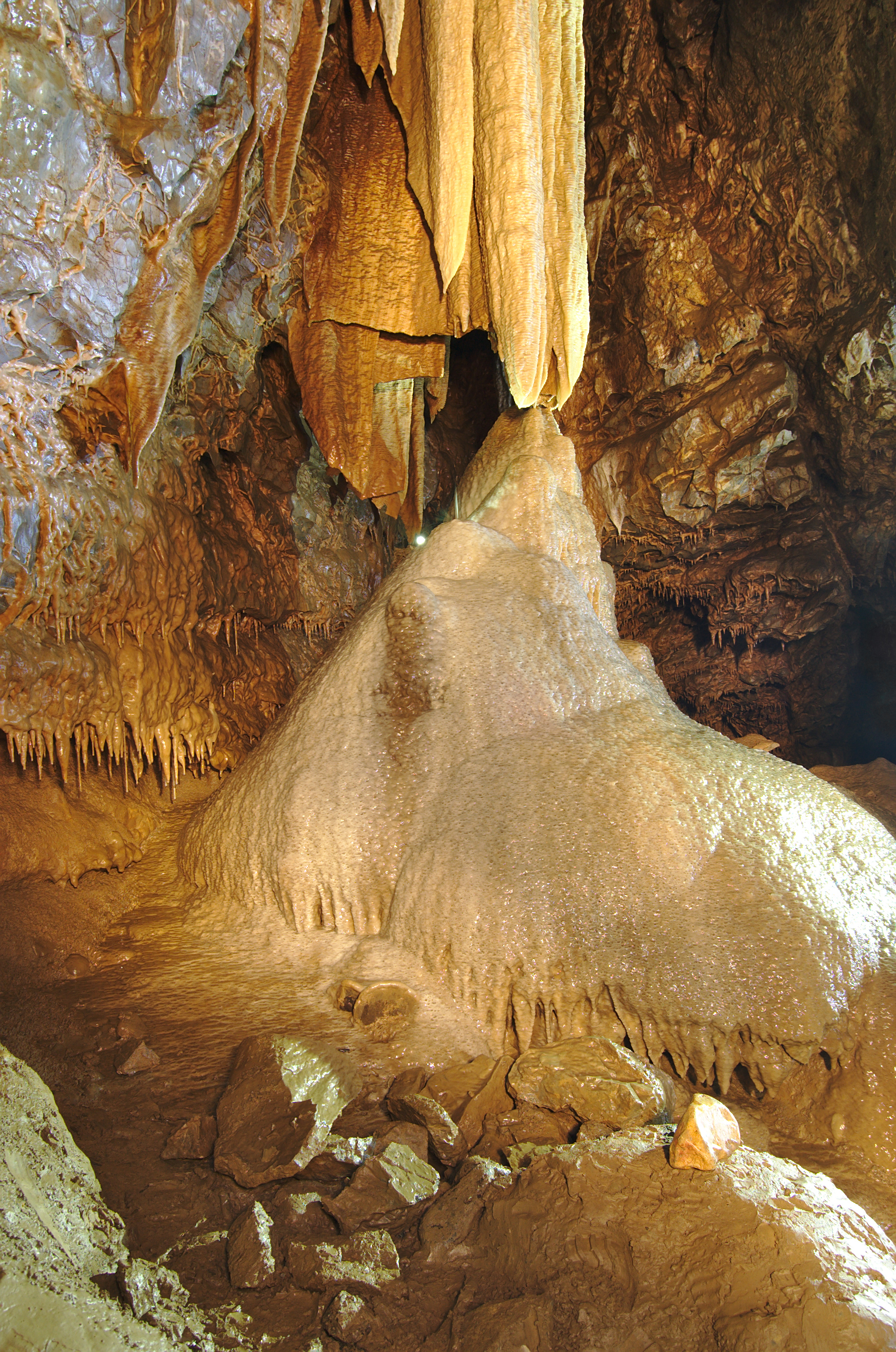
One of the giant Stalagnate

The history of explorations of the entire system already began in the early 18th century. Already in 1723 Lazarus Shopper realised the first descend into Macocha Abyss. In 1800 a first map of the Sloupské Caves (the small lateral part of whole system only) was created. Systematic research began in the second half of the 19th century, when Dr.Jindrich Wankel and Martin Kriz published the first scientific studies of the Northern Part of Moravian Karst. Prof. Karel Absolons was the first to define a theoretical connection between the Sloupsko-sosuvske Caves, Nova Rasovna cave and Macocha gorge at the beginning of the 20th century. He spent his whole life working on the clarification of this speleological problem. He only partly succeeded, but Amaterská Cave as a main key to this problem was explored in 1969 by the Planivy Caving Club. In 18. January 1969 were main part of Amatérská Cave (Stará-The old) discovered. Catastrophic stormwater flooding 29. 8. 1970 and the deaths of amateur speleologists Milan Šlechta and Marko Zahradníček after, gave name the cave. Within a short period of time, corridors connecting caves from a water sink in Nova Rasovna up to the resurgence in Punkevni cave were explored. The last unfinished part between Amaterska cave and the Sloupsko-sosuvecke Caves remained unexplored until 2005.

The cave contains a Neolithic picture, a geometrical shape resembling a grill with a size of 30x40 cm, painted in charcoal on the cave wall. The carbon was dated with the C14 radio-carbon method to be 5,200 years old. The pattern resembles the decorations on some ceramic vessels from that period.

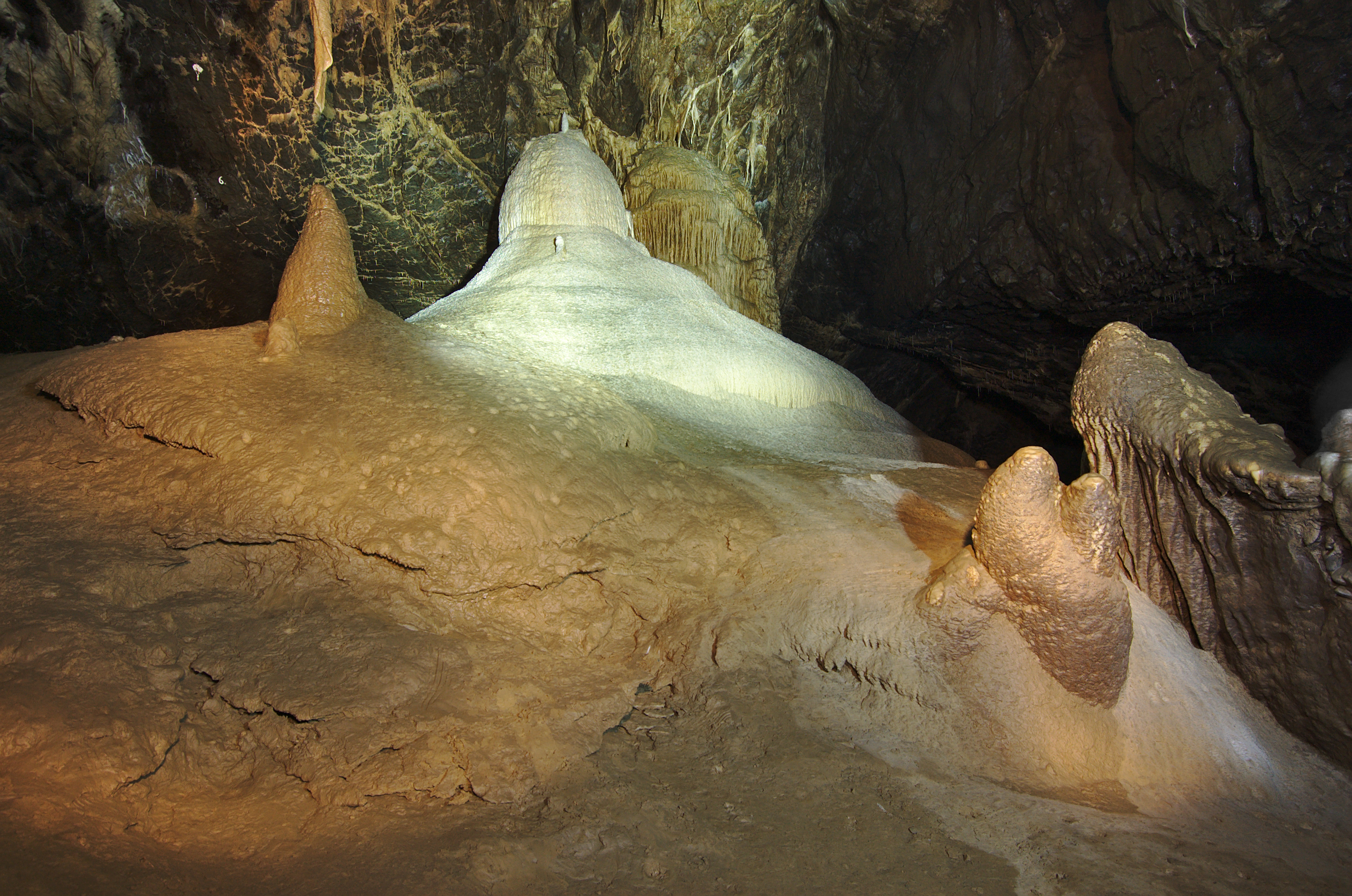
Amatérská cave, interior

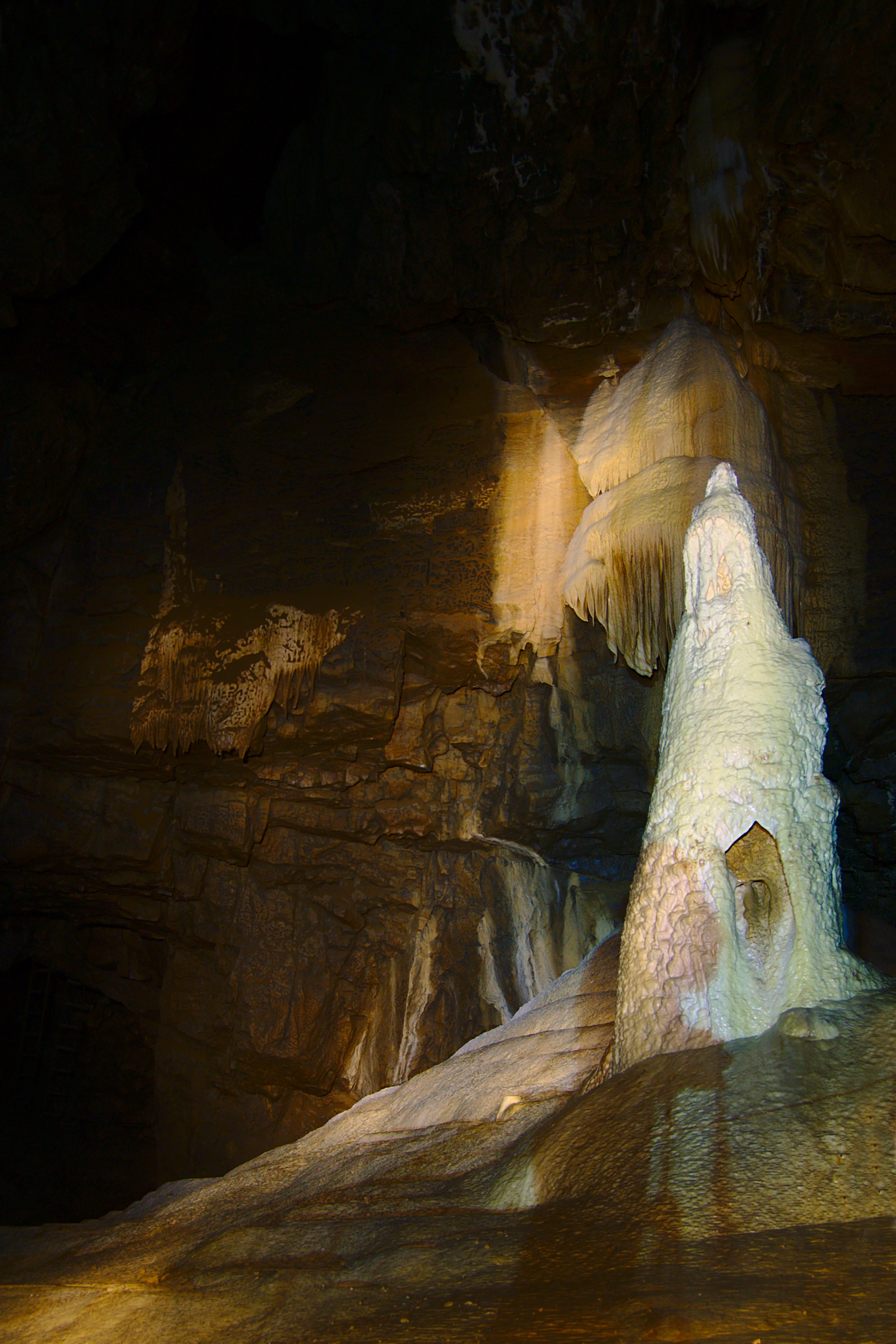
Amatérská cave, interior

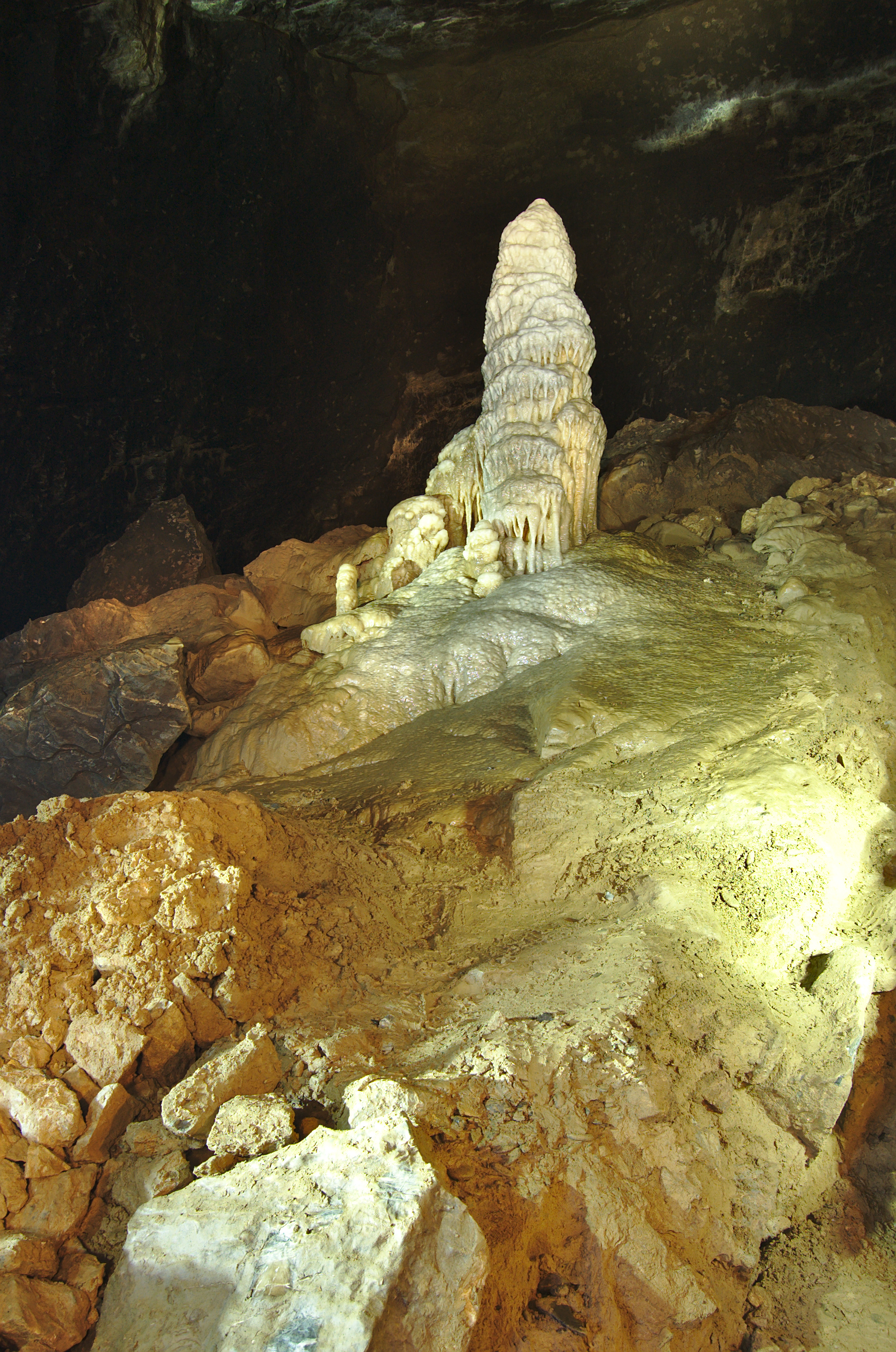
Amatérská cave, interior

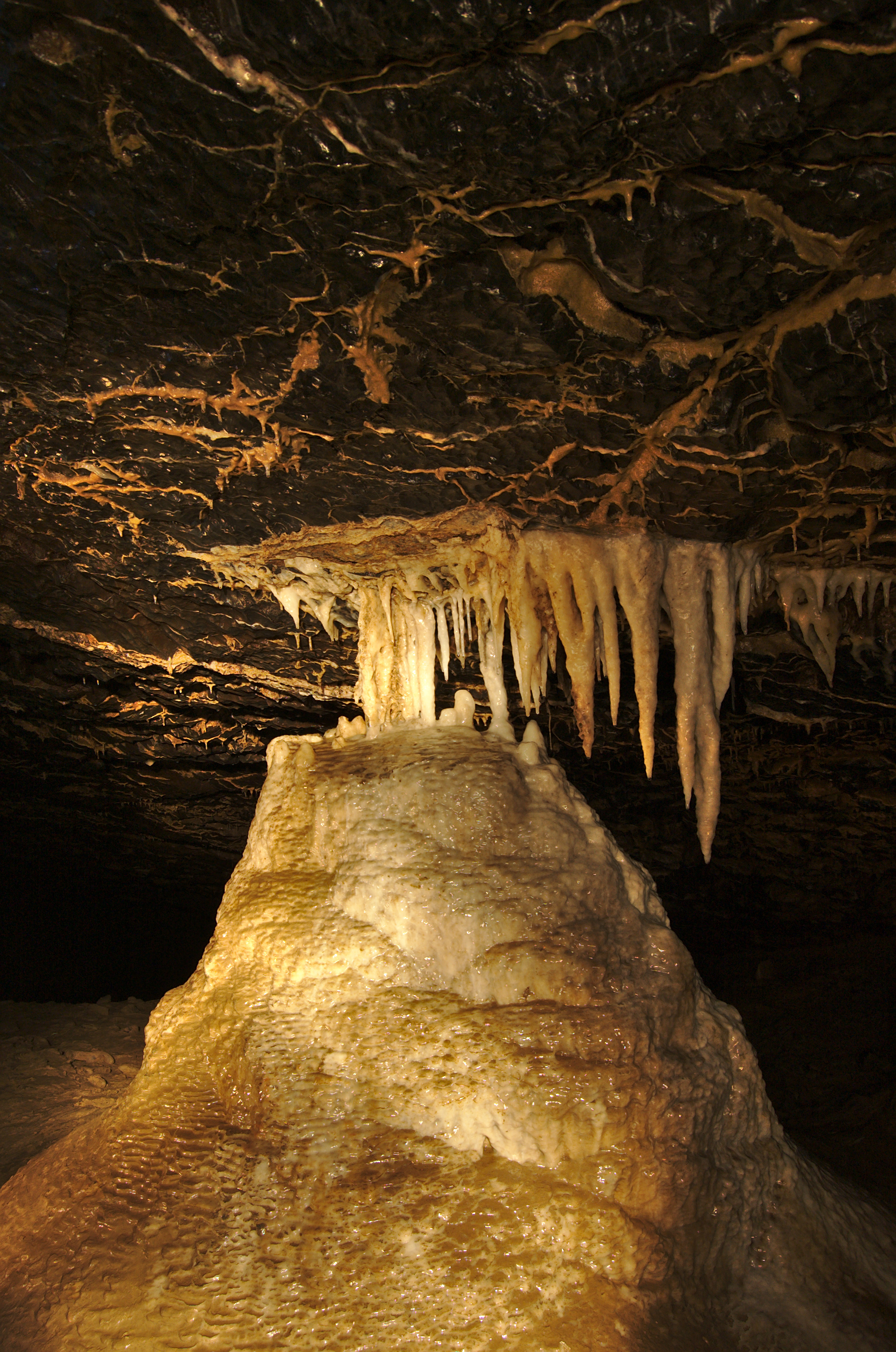
Amatérská cave, interior

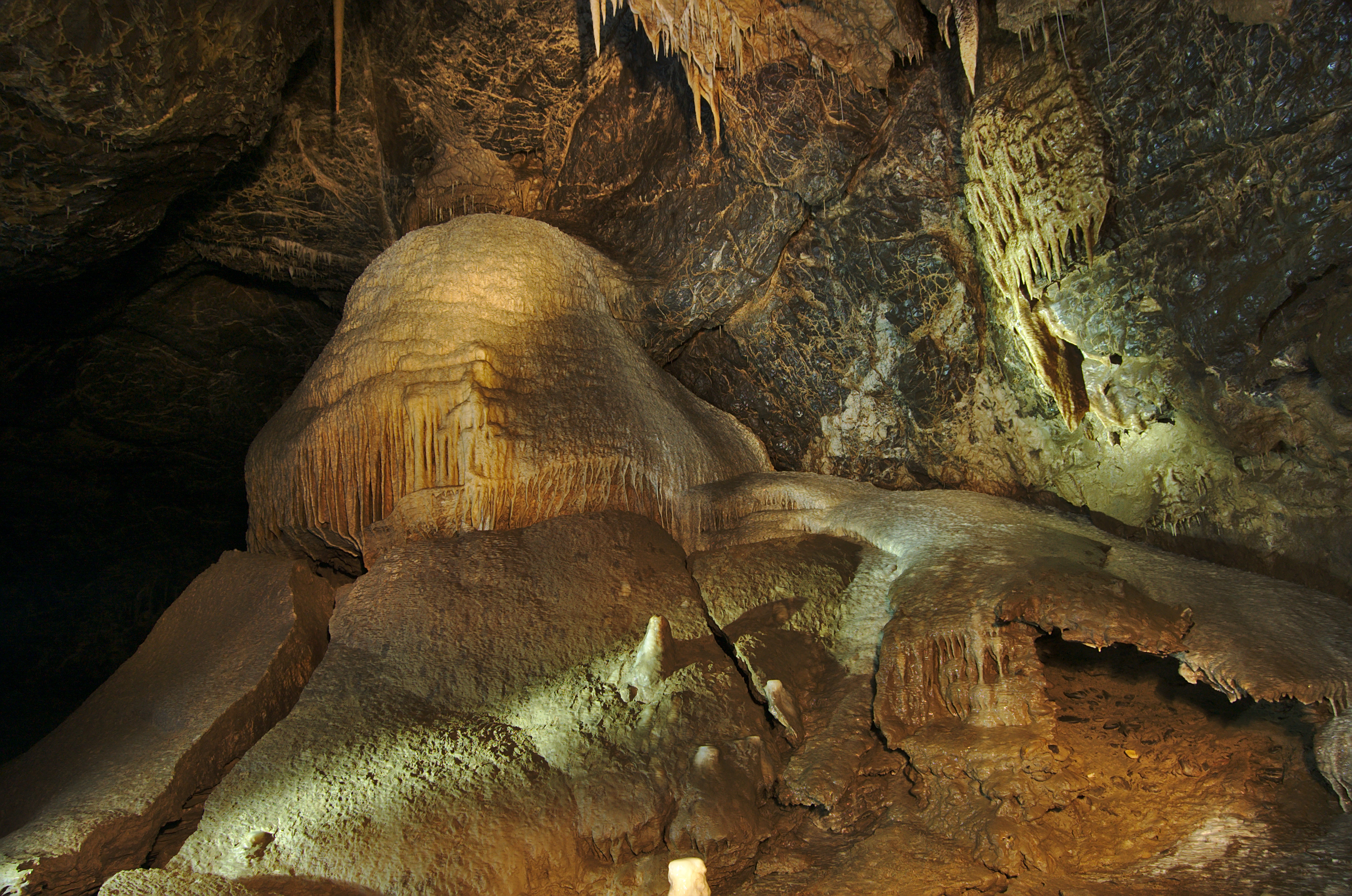
Amatérská cave, interior

== See also ==
- List of caves
- Stránská skála
- Punkva Caves
- Býčí skála Cave
- Brno Highlands
- Jindřich Wankel
- Karel Absolon
