= Býčí skála Cave =

Cave and archaeological site in the Czech Republic

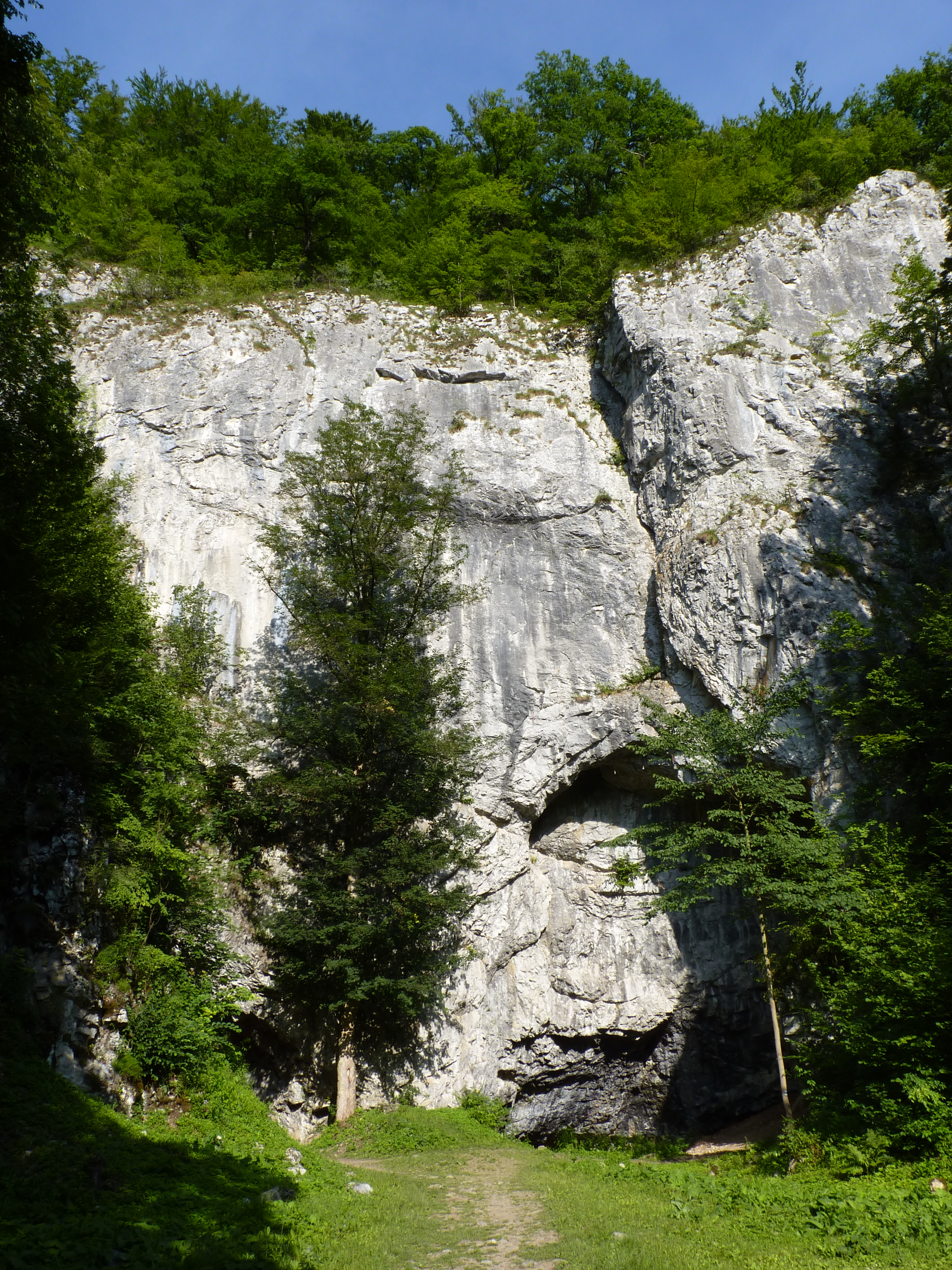
- The front rock wall

- Location within Czech Republic
- Location: Habrůvka, Moravia, Czech Republic
- Coordinates: 49°18′27″N 16°41′41″E
- Depth: 249 m (817 ft)
- Length: 13,070 m (42,880 ft)
- Geology: limestone
- Entrances: 151
- Access: by foot
- Registry: Cave E-Cadastre

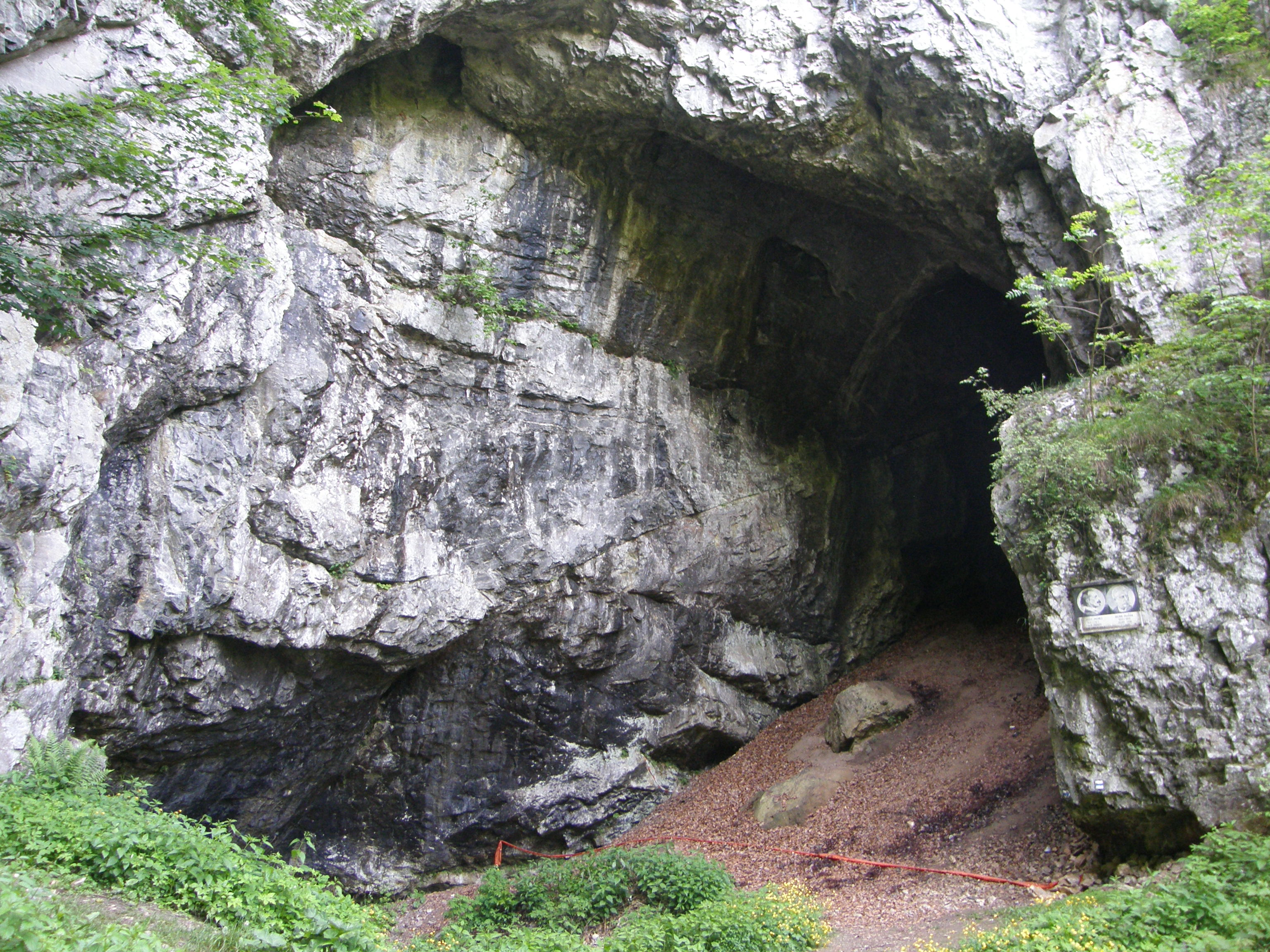
The entrance of the cave

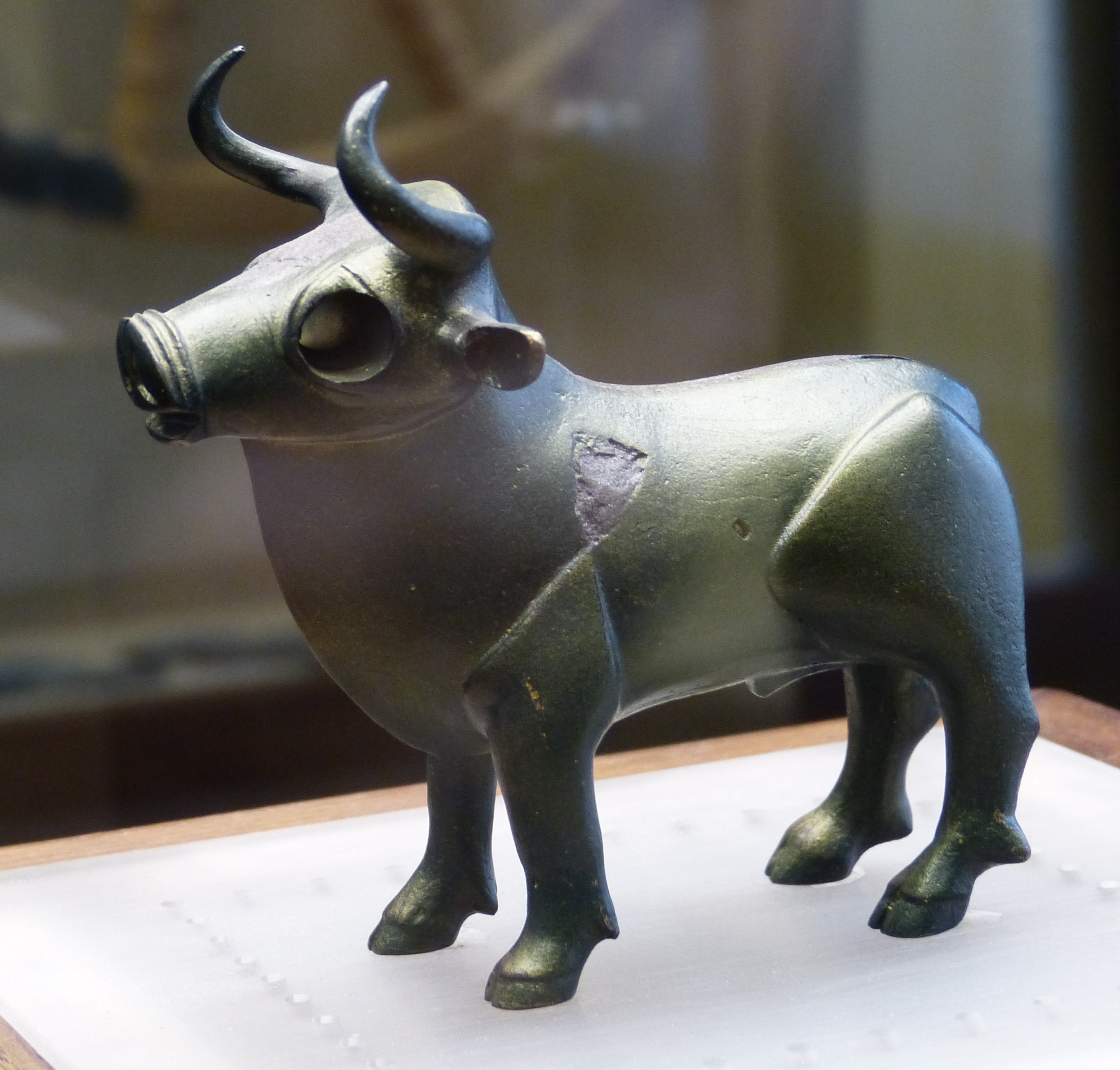
Famous Hallstatt culture bronze statue of a bull

Býčí skála Cave (Czech: Býčí skála, German: Stierfelsen, English: The Bull Rock Cave) is part of the second longest cave system in Moravia, Czech Republic. It is also famous for archaeological discoveries. Except for the entrance, the cave is not accessible to the public, although occasionally it is opened for visitors.

The cave is in the central part of the Moravian Karst, in the Josefovské Valley (Josefovské údolí) between the town of Adamov and the village of Křtiny. Together with the cave system Rudické propadání, Býčí skála forms the second longest cave system in the country, after the Amatérská Cave. Its known length is over 13 km.

== History ==
The entrance to the cave was always known locally, with the first written mention coming from 1669. The cave was visited by two European monarchs: on 7.9.1804 the Holy Roman Emperor Francis II and on another occasion Alois I, Prince of Liechtenstein. (Note: Alois I, of Liechtenstein is buried nearby - in the Mausoleum of Liechtenstein in the Church of the Nativity of the Virgin Mary, Brno-Vranov) During 1867-1873, the part named Předsíně was explored by the archaeologist Jindřich Wankel, who discovered a Palaeolithic settlement from around 100,000 - 10,000 BCE. Later, a statuette of a bronze bull was found, and starting in 1872 a large Hallstatt culture site had been excavated. The site contained animal and material offerings, crops, textiles, ceramic and sheet-metal vessels, jewellery, glass and amber beads.

According to Wankel, the skeletons of one man and forty young women were found. Some women were beheaded, some missing legs or hands. On a small "altar" a skull and severed hands were placed. Wankel's romantic interpretation was that he had discovered the grave of a nobleman, accompanied by ritually killed women. Other theories suggest the death of people hiding in the cave during a war or from an explosion of a gas or dust. Later research identified seventeen skeletons as men; the people ranged from children up to adults of 50–60 years old.

In 1920, when water was pumped out, another cave was discovered, the "Nová býčí skála" (The New Bull Rock Cave), with the Jedovnický brook (Jedovnický potok) running through it. During World War II, the Nazis built an underground factory in the cave, damaging the entrance area. After the war, a few more caves have been discovered (Sobolova (Barová), Májová, Prolomená and Proplavaná). In 1992, exploration of the brook was completed.

The cave contains a Neolithic picture, a geometrical shape resembling a grill with a size of 30x40 cm, painted in charcoal on the cave wall. The carbon was dated with the C14 radio-carbon method to be 5,200 years old. The pattern resembles the decorations on some ceramic vessels from that period.

== See also ==
- List of caves
