= Ostrov u Macochy =

- Market town
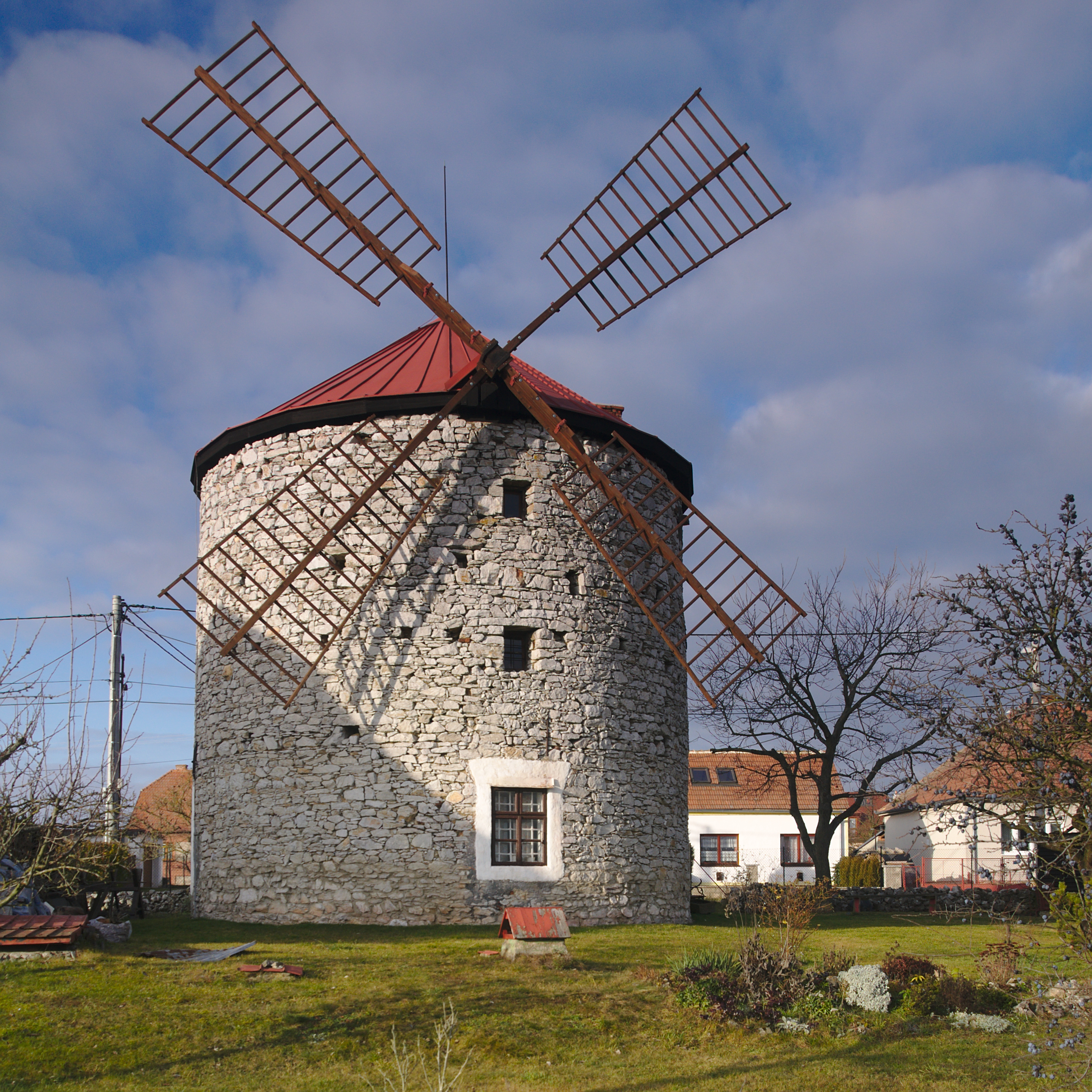
- Windmill in Ostrov u Macochy

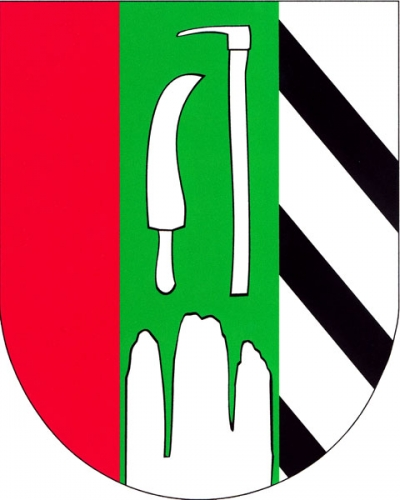
- Flag Coat of arms

- Location in the Czech Republic
- Coordinates: 49°22′57″N 16°45′46″E
- Country: Czech Republic
- Region: South Moravian
- District: Blansko
- First mentioned: 1349

Area
  - Total: 8.82 km^{2} (3.41 sq mi)
- Elevation: 485 m (1,591 ft)

Population (2026-01-01)
  - Total: 1,091
  - Density: 124/km^{2} (320/sq mi)
- Time zone: UTC+1 (CET)
  - Summer (DST): UTC+2 (CEST)
- Postal code: 679 14
- Website: www.ostrovumacochy.cz

Ostrov u Macochy (Czech pronunciation: [ˈostrof ˈu matsoxɪ]) is a market town in Blansko District in the South Moravian Region of the Czech Republic. It has about 1,100 inhabitants.

== Etymology ==
In Czech, the name means 'island'.

== Geography ==
Ostrov u Macochy is located about 8 kilometres (5 mi) east of Blansko and 21 km (13 mi) northeast of Brno. It lies in an elevated plateau in the Drahany Highlands. The highest point is at 523 m (1,716 ft) above sea level. The entire municipal territory lies within the Moravian Karst Protected Landscape Area. The Macocha Gorge, containted in the name of the municipality, is located southwest of Ostrov u Macochy, outside the municipal territory.

== History ==
The first written mention of Ostrov is from 1349. It was a part of the Holštejn estate, owned by the Lords of Holštejn. In the 1430s, the estate was sold to the Waldstein family.

In 1912, the municipality was promoted to a market town. In the 1920s, Ostrov was renamed Ostrov u Macochy.

== Demographics ==
Historical population

Year	Pop.	±%
1869	1,089	—
1880	1,210	+11.1%
1890	1,172	−3.1%
1900	1,140	−2.7%
1910	1,173	+2.9%

Year	Pop.	±%
1921	1,234	+5.2%
1930	1,261	+2.2%
1950	1,261	+0.0%
1961	1,277	+1.3%
1970	1,216	−4.8%

Year	Pop.	±%
1980	1,173	−3.5%
1991	1,111	−5.3%
2001	1,086	−2.3%
2011	1,081	−0.5%
2021	1,082	+0.1%

Source: Censuses

== Transport ==
There are no railways or major roads running through the municipal territory.

== Sights ==
The most important monument is a Dutch-type windmill. It dates from 1865. The internal equipment was not preserved.

The main landmark is the Church of Saint Mary Magdalene, founded in 1490. After it fell ito disrepair, it was reconstructed in 1690. Then it was extended in 1785 and completely reconstructed in 1848. The next reconstruction took place after 1851, when the church tower was damaged by a lightning strike.
