= Výpustek Cave =

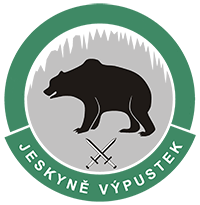
- Interactive map of Výpustek Cave
- 49°17′27″N 16°43′27″E
- Type: limestone karst
- Location: Křtiny, Czech Republic

Site notes
- Length: 2.5 km (1.55 mi)

Výpustek Cave (Czech: jeskyně Výpustek) is show cave in the central part of the Moravian Karst Protected Landscape Area in Czech Republic. It is located in the upper section of the Křtiny Valley, in the municipality of Křtiny. It forms two subterranean levels of the ancient ponor system of the Křtinský Brook. It is a significant paleontological locality, one of the few European sites where complete skeletons of early Quaternary (Pleistocene) fauna can be found.

The total length of all the spaces known today is ca. 1,300 m with denivelation of 55 m. In the period of speleological explorations in the 18th century it was considered the largest cave in Moravia. During the 20th century it was intensively used for exploitation of phosphate clay, as an army depot, German army factory – airplane motors manufacturing, and secret command post of the Czechoslovak People's Army; in spite of that some parts were preserved in the natural state. The cave has been open for tourist visits since 2008.

Public tours are 600 m long and take 75 minutes. Air temperature 7–8 °C (46 °F), relative humidity cca 95%.

== Gallery ==
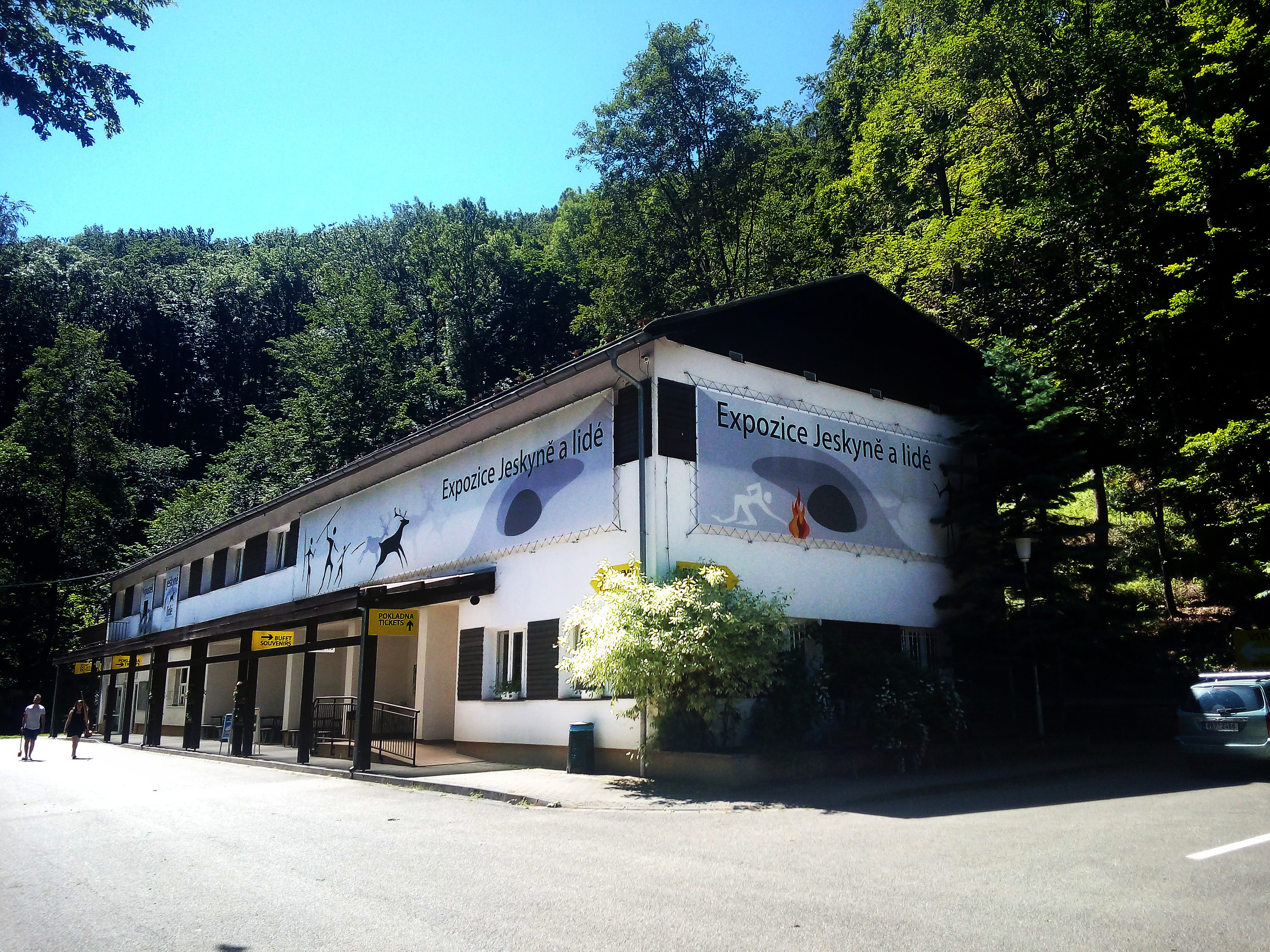
Entrance building

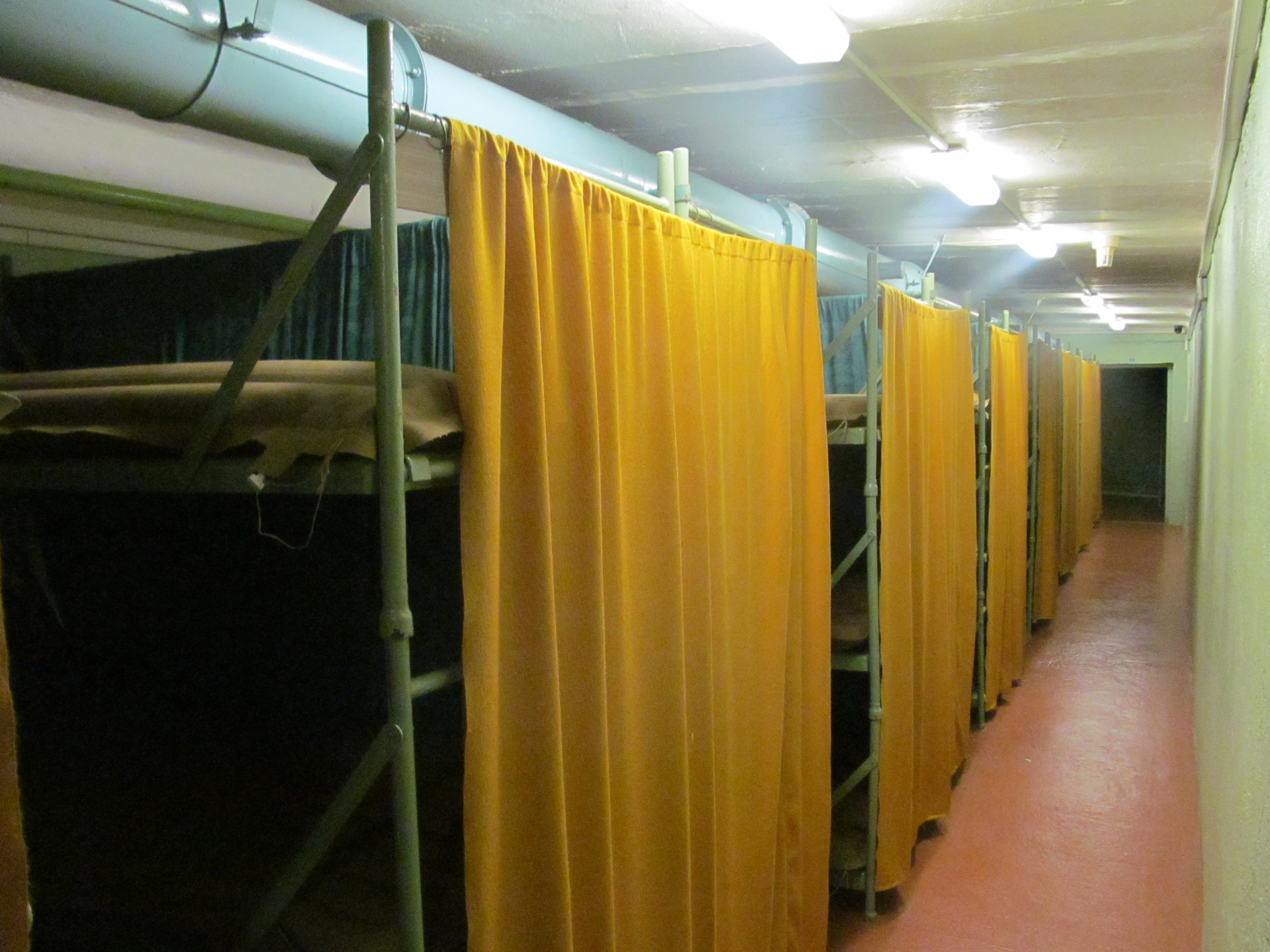
Výpustek Cave

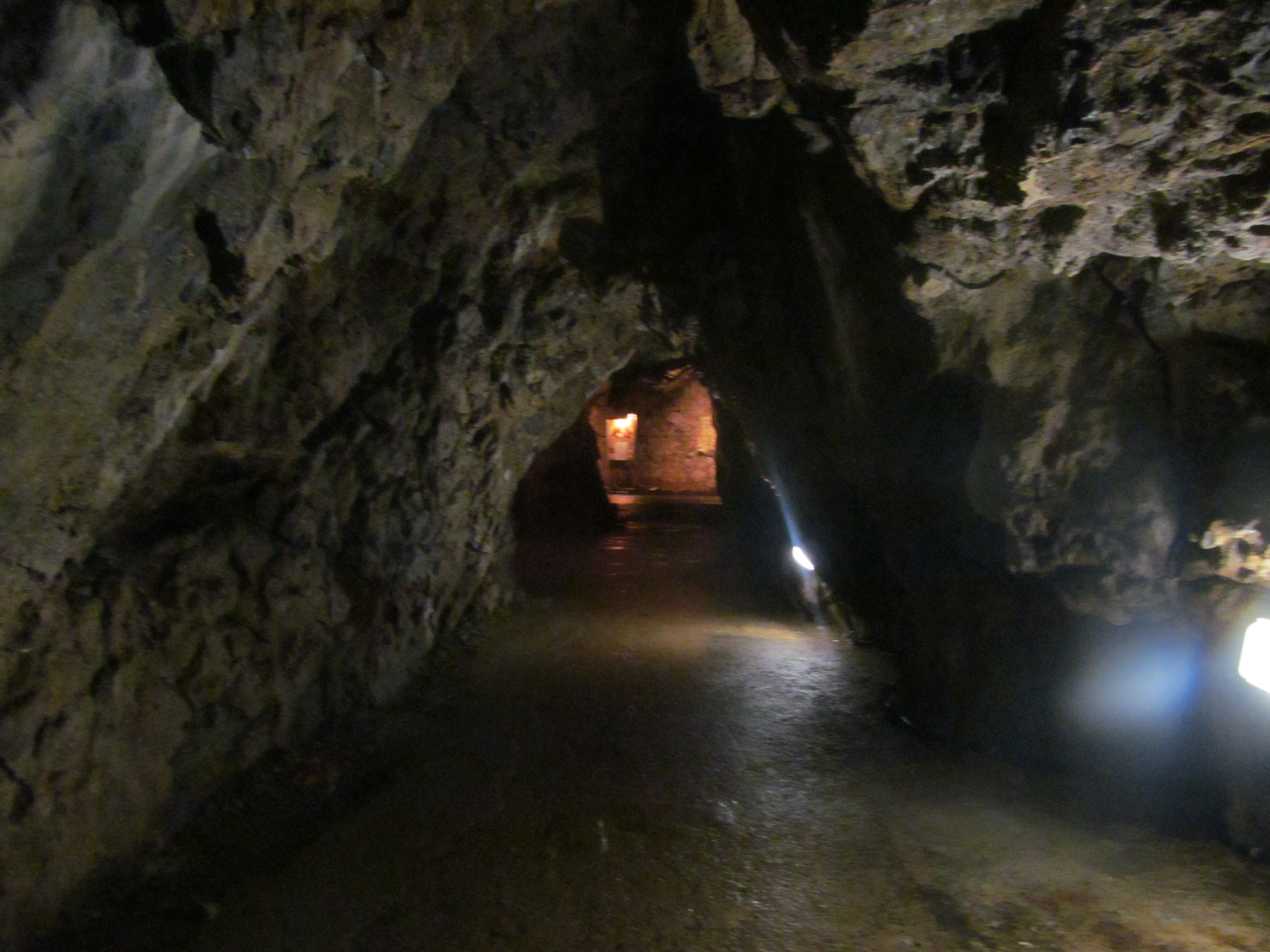
Výpustek Cave

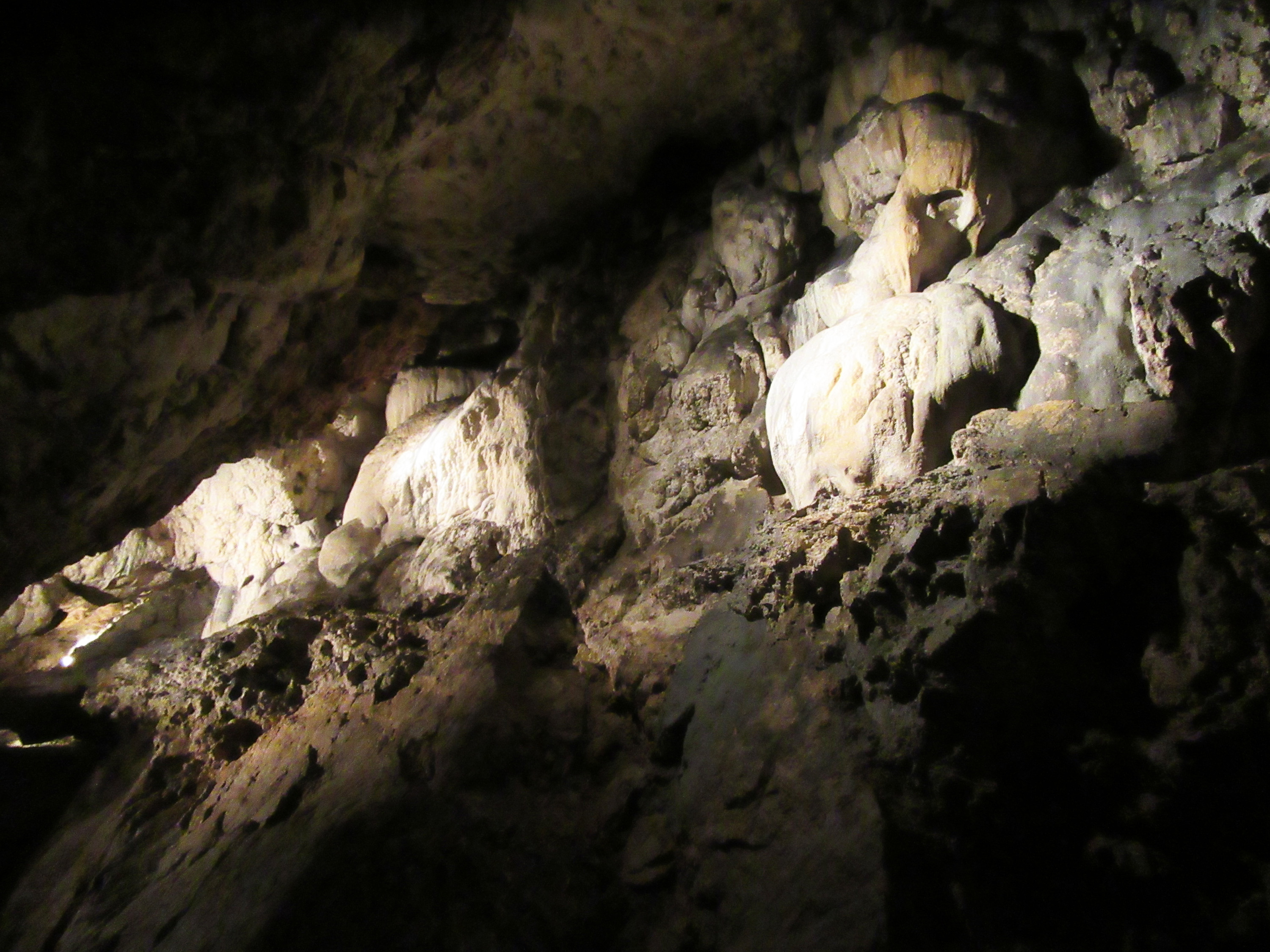
Výpustek Cave

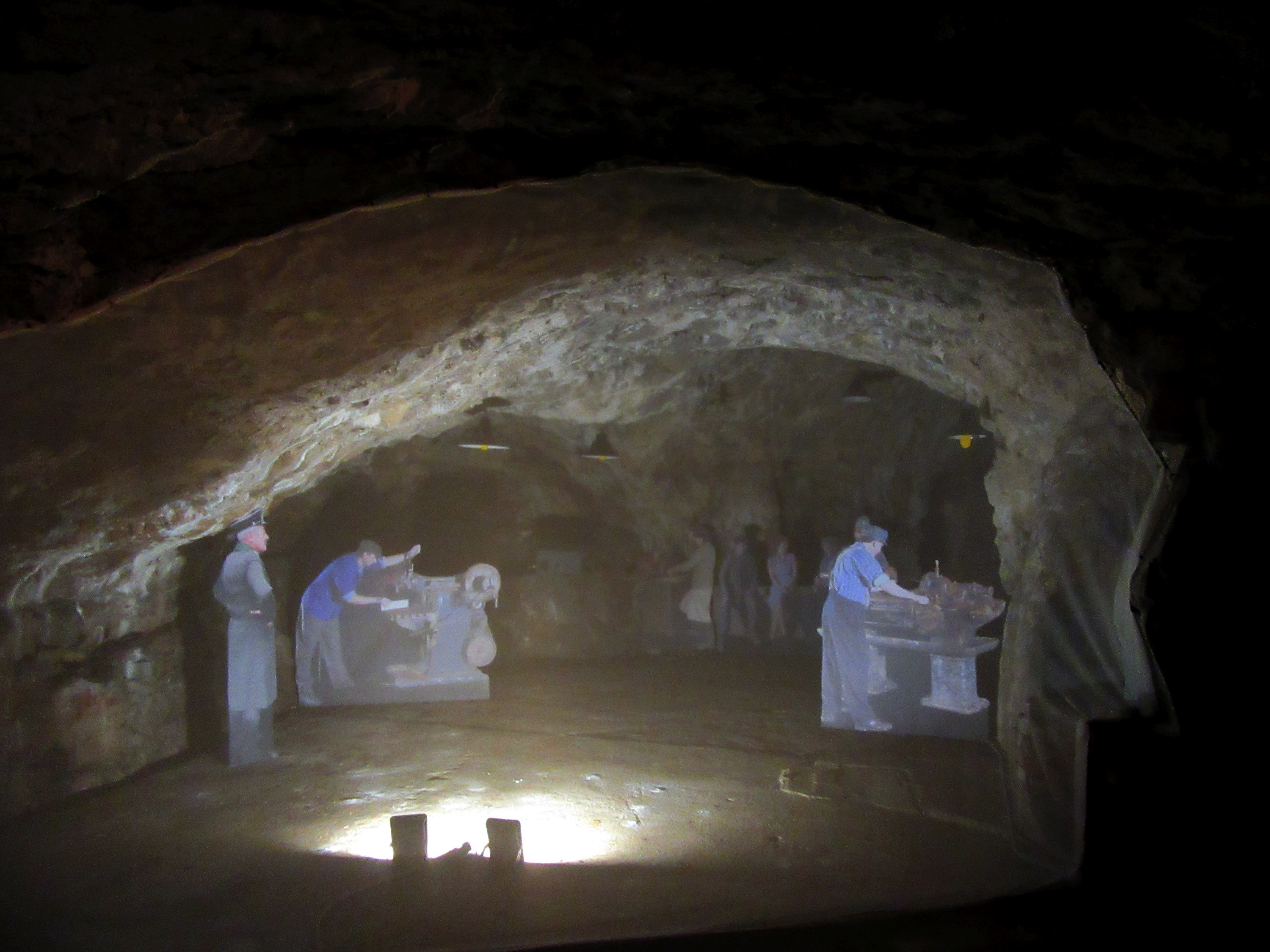
Výpustek Cave
