= Sloup (Blansko District) =

- Market town
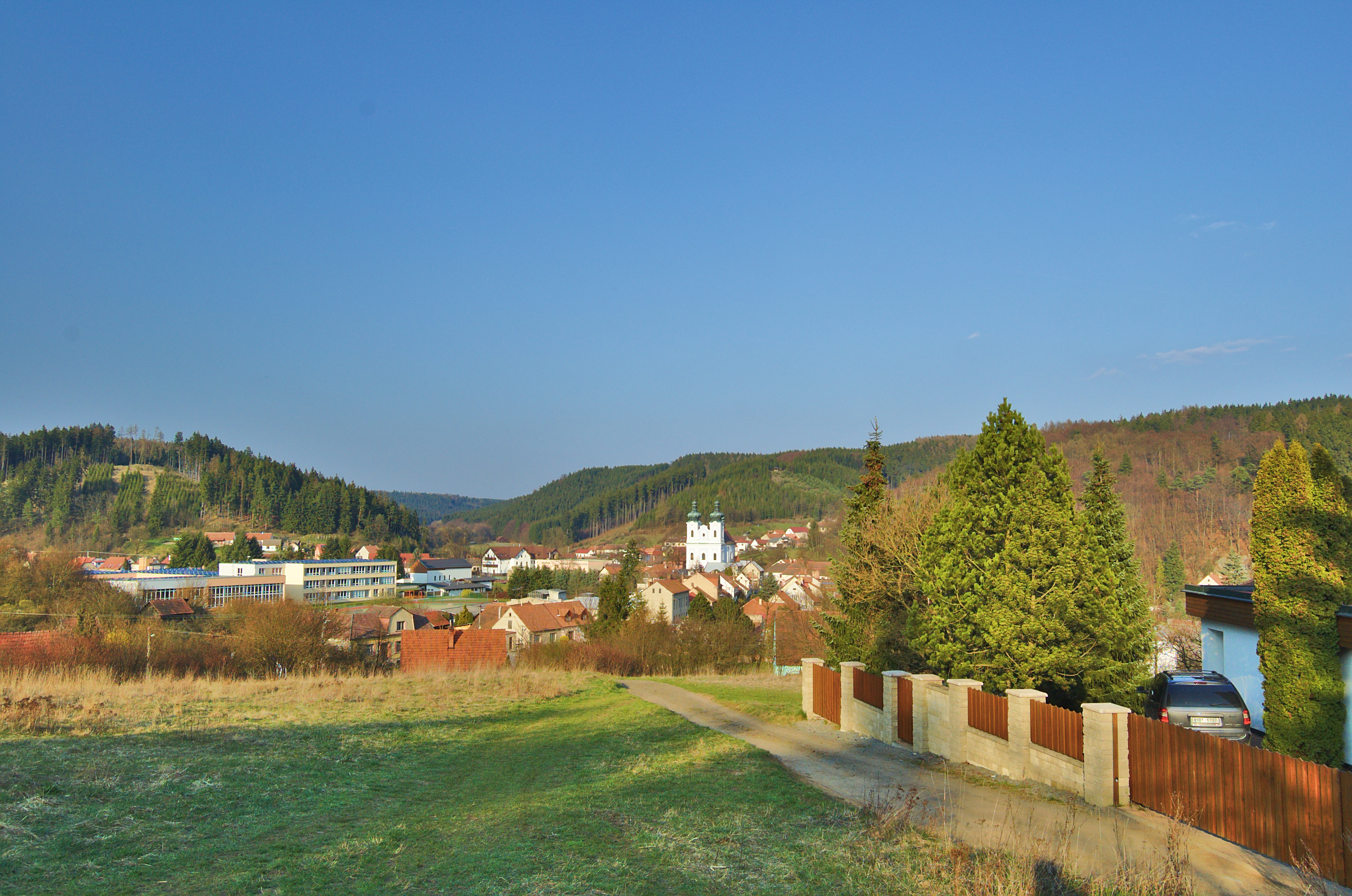
- View from the west

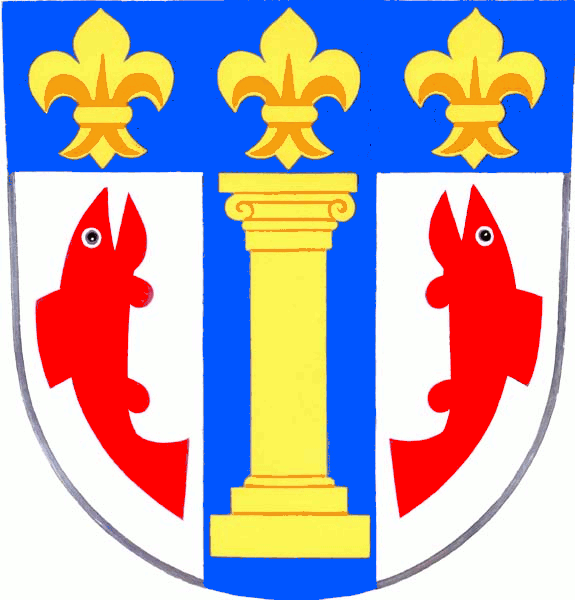
- Flag Coat of arms

- Location in the Czech Republic
- Coordinates: 49°24′53″N 16°44′22″E
- Country: Czech Republic
- Region: South Moravian
- District: Blansko
- First mentioned: 1373

Area
  - Total: 7.65 km^{2} (2.95 sq mi)
- Elevation: 471 m (1,545 ft)

Population (2026-01-01)
  - Total: 962
  - Density: 126/km^{2} (326/sq mi)
- Time zone: UTC+1 (CET)
  - Summer (DST): UTC+2 (CEST)
- Postal code: 679 13
- Website: www.mestyssloup.cz

Sloup (Czech pronunciation: [ˈsloup]) is a market town in Blansko District in the South Moravian Region of the Czech Republic. It has about 1,000 inhabitants.

== Etymology ==
The name literally means 'column' in Czech. The settlement was named after the nearby Hřebenáč rock formation, which has the shape of a column.

== Geography ==
Sloup is located about 9 kilometres (6 mi) northeast of Blansko and 24 km (15 mi) north of Brno. It lies in the Drahany Highlands. The highest point is the hill Bučí at 653 m (2,142 ft) above sea level. Sloup lies on the northern border of the Moravian Karst Protected Landscape Area. In the municipality is located part of the Sloupsko-šošůvské jeskyně Nature Reserve ('Sloup-Šošůvka caves').

== History ==
The first written mention of Sloup is from 1373. The estate often changed hands; the most notable owners were the Pernštejn family in the first half of the 16th century. At the end of the 16th century, Sloup became part of the Rájec estate, which lasted until the establishment of a separate municipality in 1848.

In 1862, Sloup was promoted to a market town.

== Demographics ==
Historical population

Year	Pop.	±%
1869	539	—
1880	425	−21.2%
1890	436	+2.6%
1900	467	+7.1%
1910	636	+36.2%

Year	Pop.	±%
1921	579	−9.0%
1930	595	+2.8%
1950	610	+2.5%
1961	676	+10.8%
1970	751	+11.1%

Year	Pop.	±%
1980	913	+21.6%
1991	931	+2.0%
2001	891	−4.3%
2011	931	+4.5%
2021	941	+1.1%

Source: Censuses

== Transport ==
There are no railways or major roads passing through the municipal territory.

== Sights ==
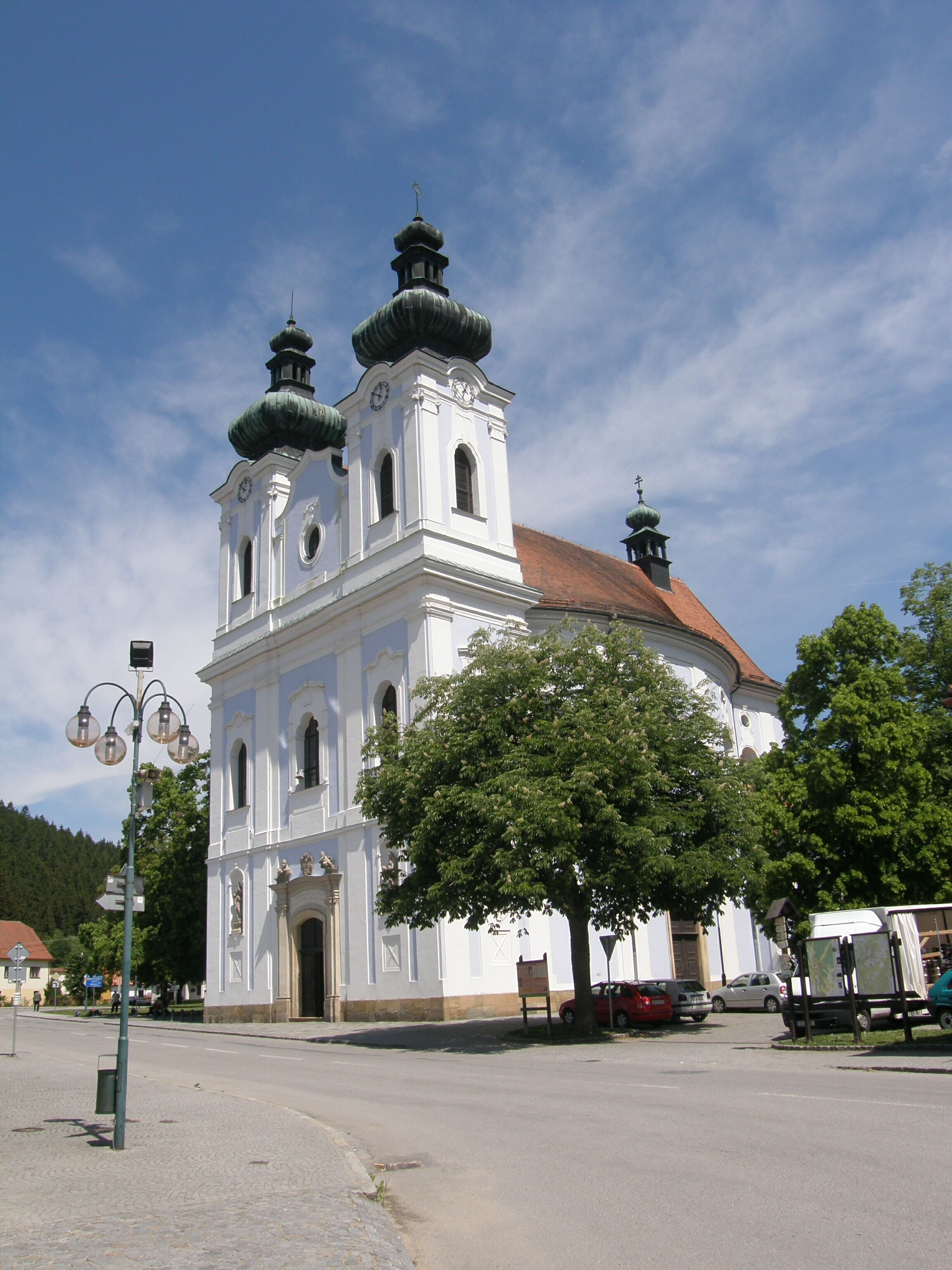
Church of Our Lady of Sorrows

The main landmark of Sloup is the Church of Our Lady of Sorrows. The church was built in the Baroque style in 1751–1754. It is an important regional Marian pilgrimage site, connected with a statue of Our Lady of Sorrows.

The cave system is the largest accessible cave system in the country. Its part, which is located in the municipal territory, includes the Kůlna Cave, which became a remarkable European Paleolithic site since the 1880s.
