= Kůlna Cave =

Cave and archaeological site in the Czech Republic

- Jeskyně Kůlna
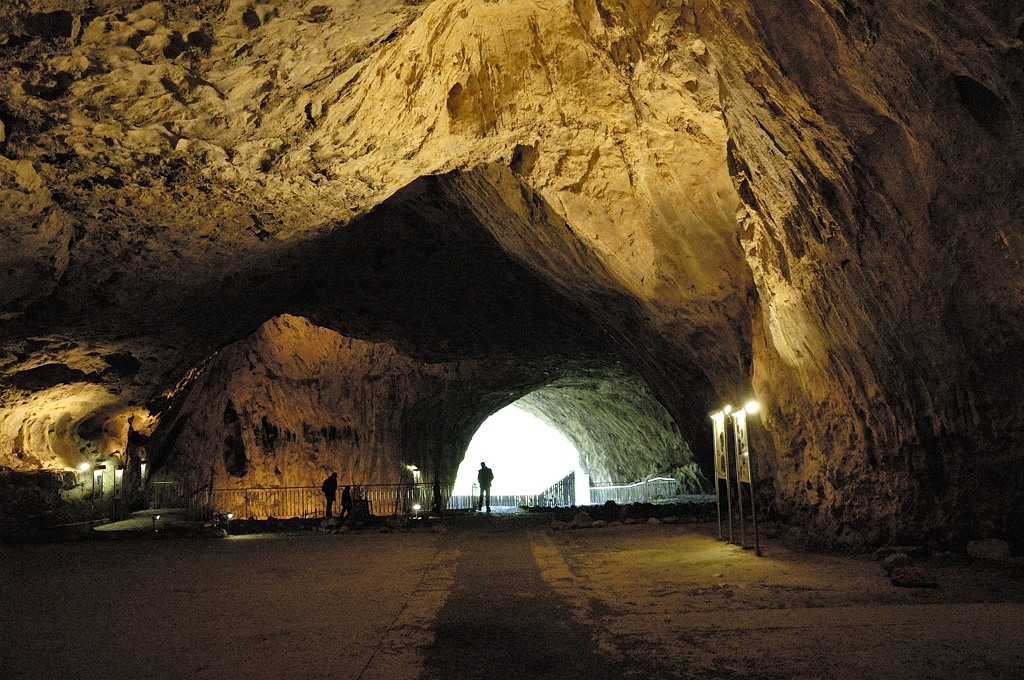
- Cave interior

- Location in the Czech Republic
- 49°24′27″N 16°44′19″E
- Type: Cave
- Periods: Paleolithic
- Location: Sloup
- Region: South Moravian

The Kůlna Cave (Czech: jeskyně Kůlna) is a cave in the South Moravian Region of the Czech Republic. It is part of the Moravian Karst. A visit to Kůlna Cave is part of the sightseeing tours of the Sloup-Šošůvka Caves.

== Geography ==
The cave is located in the municipal territory of Sloup, about 23 km (14 mi) north of Brno. It lies in the northern part of the Moravian Karst Protected Landscape Area, within the Sloup-Šošůvka Caves Nature Reserve.

== Paleontology ==
The cave is noted for its Paleolithic and Mesolithic material and evidence of human presence. The oldest remains comprise stone tools with an estimated age of 120,000 years. Dated to about 50,000 years ago are Neanderthal skeletal remains including the upper jaw bone of an immature male (14 or 15 years old) which was discovered in 1965 and the right parietal bone of a man which was discovered in 1970.

Later objects and artifacts indicate the presence of mammoth hunters of the Gravettian culture from around 25,000 years ago, as well as reindeer and wild horse hunters from between 13,000 and 10,000 years ago. Bronze Age artifacts have also been found dating back to the 9th and 8th centuries BCE.
