= Šošůvka =

- Municipality
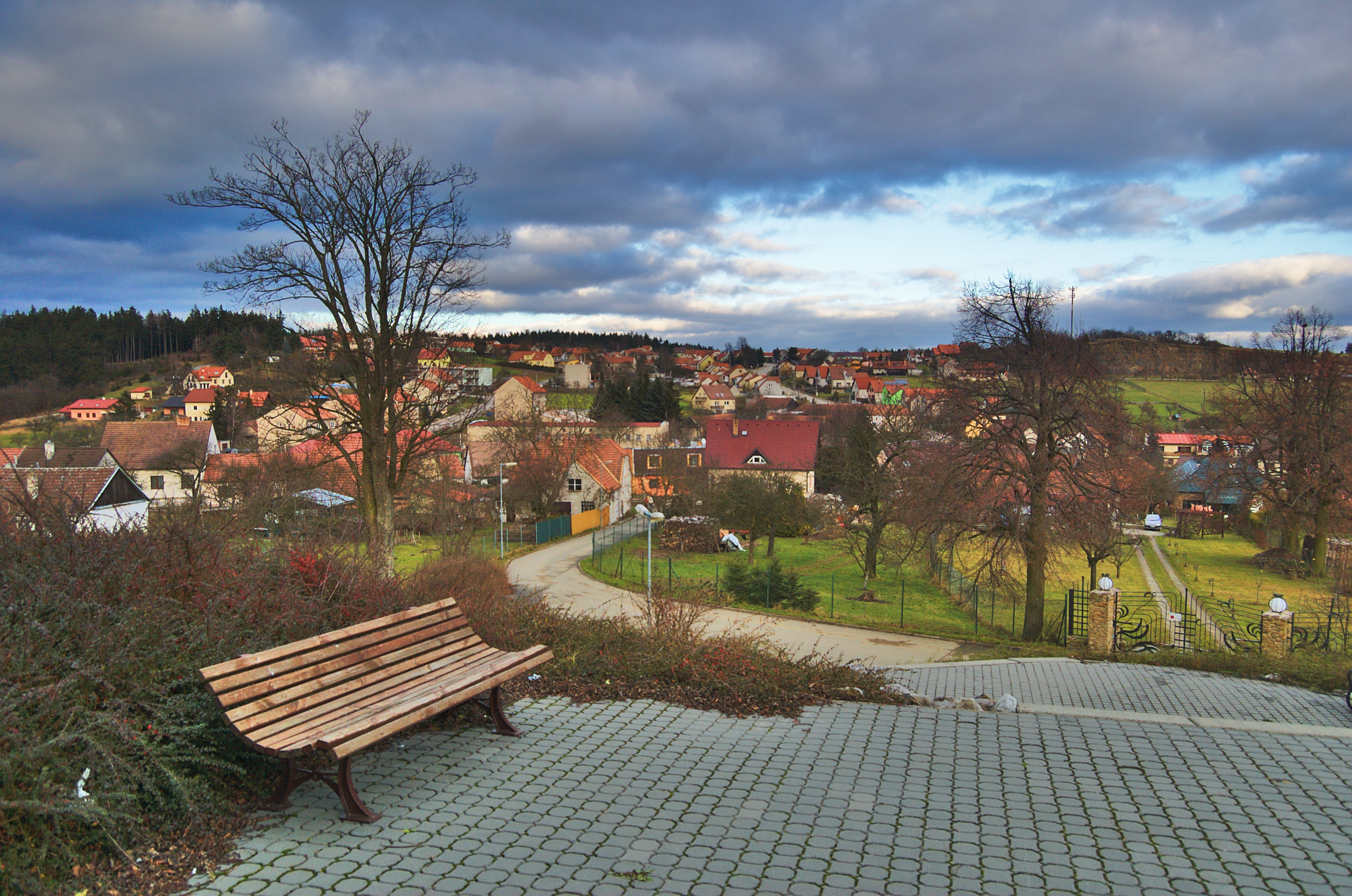
- General view

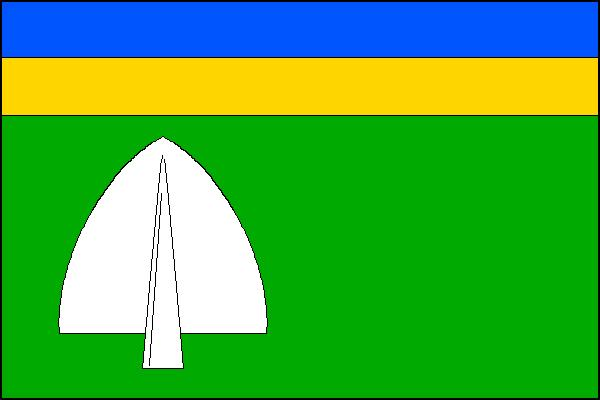
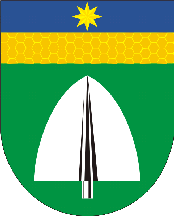
- Flag Coat of arms

- Location in the Czech Republic
- Coordinates: 49°24′38″N 16°45′7″E
- Country: Czech Republic
- Region: South Moravian
- District: Blansko
- First mentioned: 1374

Area
  - Total: 5.12 km^{2} (1.98 sq mi)
- Elevation: 575 m (1,886 ft)

Population (2026-01-01)
  - Total: 694
  - Density: 136/km^{2} (351/sq mi)
- Time zone: UTC+1 (CET)
  - Summer (DST): UTC+2 (CEST)
- Postal code: 679 13
- Website: sosuvka.com

Šošůvka is a municipality and village in Blansko District in the South Moravian Region of the Czech Republic. It has about 700 inhabitants.

== Geography ==
Šošůvka is located about 9 kilometres (6 mi) northeast of Blansko and 24 km (15 mi) northeast of Brno. It lies in the Drahany Highlands. The highest point is the hill Helišova skála at 613 m (2,011 ft) above sea level. Šošůvka lies on the northern border of the Moravian Karst Protected Landscape Area. Part of the Sloupsko-šošůvské jeskyně Nature Reserve ('Sloup-Šošůvka caves') is located in the municipality.

== History ==
The first written mention of Šošůvka is from 1374.

== Demographics ==
Historical population

Year	Pop.	±%
1869	477	—
1880	649	+36.1%
1890	713	+9.9%
1900	703	−1.4%
1910	732	+4.1%

Year	Pop.	±%
1921	728	−0.5%
1930	680	−6.6%
1950	628	−7.6%
1961	682	+8.6%
1970	697	+2.2%

Year	Pop.	±%
1980	700	+0.4%
1991	694	−0.9%
2001	711	+2.4%
2011	670	−5.8%
2021	651	−2.8%

Source: Censuses

== Transport ==
There are no railways or major roads passing through the municipality.

== Sights ==
The only protected cultural monuments in the municipality are the two crosses: a stone cross from 1800 and a cast iron cross from 1855.

The main landmark of Šošůvka is the Chapel of Saints Wenceslaus and Agnes, located next to the cemetery. It is a modern chapel, built in 2001–2002.
