= Křtiny =

- Market town
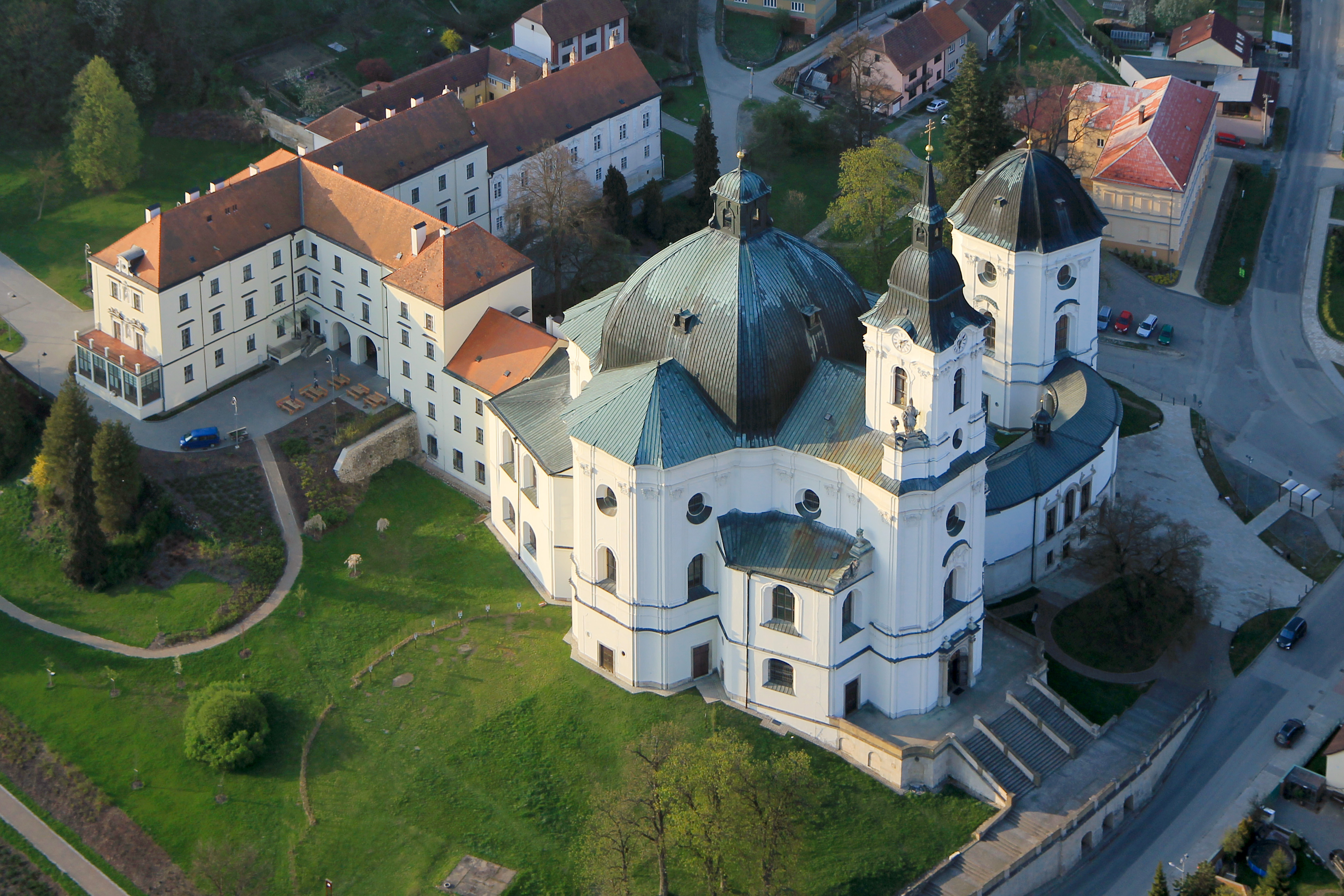
- Church of the Name of the Virgin Mary

- Flag Coat of arms

- Location in the Czech Republic
- Coordinates: 49°17′49″N 16°44′39″E
- Country: Czech Republic
- Region: South Moravian
- District: Blansko
- First mentioned: 1237

Area
  - Total: 11.18 km^{2} (4.32 sq mi)
- Elevation: 417 m (1,368 ft)

Population (2026-01-01)
  - Total: 814
  - Density: 72.8/km^{2} (189/sq mi)
- Time zone: UTC+1 (CET)
  - Summer (DST): UTC+2 (CEST)
- Postal code: 679 05
- Website: www.krtiny.cz

Křtiny (Czech pronunciation: [ˈkr̝̊cɪnɪ]) is a market town in Blansko District in the South Moravian Region of the Czech Republic. It has about 800 inhabitants. Křtiny is known for a pilgrimage site with the Church of the Name of the Virgin Mary, which is protected as a national cultural monument.

== Geography ==
Křtiny is located about 9 kilometres (6 mi) southeast of Blansko and 12 km (7 mi) northeast of Brno. It lies in the Drahany Highlands, on the boundary of the Moravian Karst Protected Landscape Area. The highest point is the Proklest hill at 574 m (1,883 ft) above sea level. The stream Křtinský potok flows through the municipality. Its tributary, a brook named Zemanův žleb, supplies several small fishponds.

== History ==
The first written mention of Křtiny is in a deed of Pope Gregory IX from 1237, when the village was owned by a women's monastery in Zábrdovice (today part of Brno). The monastery established a branch here, but it was burned down in 1423, during the Hussite Wars. After the war, the Zábrdovice Monastery was forced to pledge Křtiny, but in the second half of the 15th century the monastery regained the village and owned it until the dissolution of the monastery in 1784. During the Thirty Years' War, Křtiny was looted and badly damaged several times.

From 1830 to 1854, Křtiny was property of the Dietrichstein family.

== Demographics ==
Historical population

| Year | Pop. | ±% |
|---|---|---|
| 1869 | 612 | — |
| 1880 | 571 | −6.7% |
| 1890 | 558 | −2.3% |
| 1900 | 547 | −2.0% |
| 1910 | 530 | −3.1% |

| Year | Pop. | ±% |
|---|---|---|
| 1921 | 504 | −4.9% |
| 1930 | 513 | +1.8% |
| 1950 | 649 | +26.5% |
| 1961 | 779 | +20.0% |
| 1970 | 822 | +5.5% |

| Year | Pop. | ±% |
|---|---|---|
| 1980 | 826 | +0.5% |
| 1991 | 754 | −8.7% |
| 2001 | 768 | +1.9% |
| 2011 | 796 | +3.6% |
| 2021 | 874 | +9.8% |

Source: Censuses

== Transport ==
There are no railways or major roads passing through the municipality.

== Sights ==
Křtiny is known for a significant European pilgrimage site administered by the Premonstratensians. In 1718, a Baroque pilgrim complex was created by the original project of Jan Santini Aichel, but was modified during construction and was never fully completed. It comprises the Church of the Name of the Virgin Mary with a Gothic statue of the Virgin Mary and an ossuary and the adjacent Křtiny Manor from the 19th century, formerly the Provost residence. The church is protected as a national cultural monument.

In the municipality is the karst show cave Výpustek, formerly a secret army cave shelter.
