= Habrůvka =

- Municipality
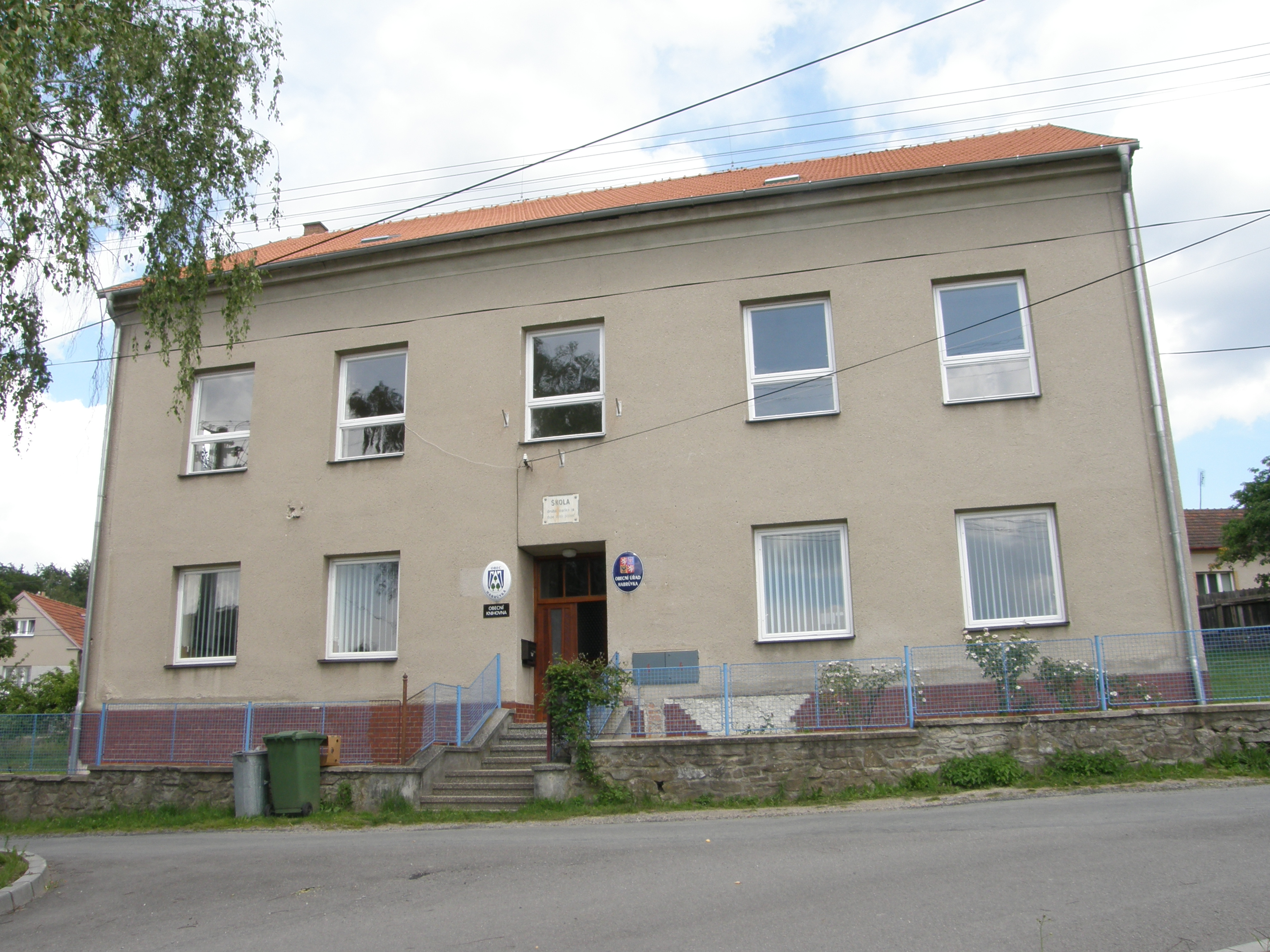
- Municipal office

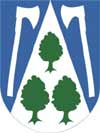
- Flag Coat of arms

- Location in the Czech Republic
- Coordinates: 49°18′13″N 16°43′25″E
- Country: Czech Republic
- Region: South Moravian
- District: Blansko
- First mentioned: 1365

Area
  - Total: 9.95 km^{2} (3.84 sq mi)
- Elevation: 490 m (1,610 ft)

Population (2026-01-01)
  - Total: 424
  - Density: 42.6/km^{2} (110/sq mi)
- Time zone: UTC+1 (CET)
  - Summer (DST): UTC+2 (CEST)
- Postal code: 679 05
- Website: www.habruvka.cz

Habrůvka is a municipality and village in Blansko District in the South Moravian Region of the Czech Republic. It has about 400 inhabitants.

Habrůvka lies approximately 9 kilometres (6 mi) south-east of Blansko, 14 km (9 mi) north-east of Brno, and 187 km (116 mi) south-east of Prague.

== Demographics ==
Historical population
Year	Pop.	±%
1869	483	—
1880	486	+0.6%
1890	592	+21.8%
1900	618	+4.4%
1910	600	−2.9%
1921	549	−8.5%
1930	575	+4.7%
1950	709	+23.3%
1961	464	−34.6%
1970	446	−3.9%
1980	370	−17.0%
1991	346	−6.5%
2001	335	−3.2%
2011	388	+15.8%
2021	456	+17.5%
Source: Censuses
