= Moravian Karst =

Karst landscape and protected landscape area in Czech Republic

Coordinates: 49°16′41″N 16°44′3″E

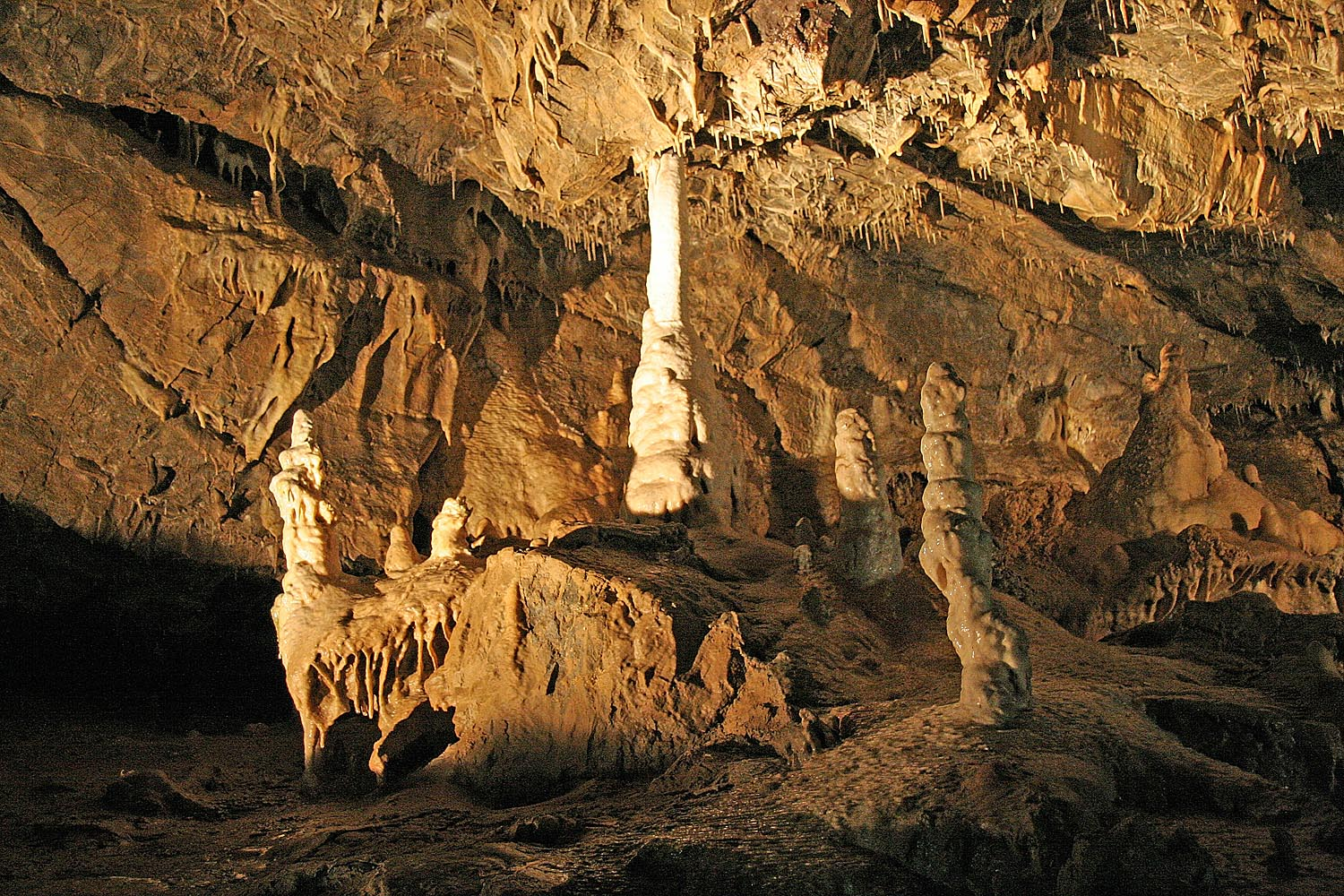
- Punkevní jeskyně, one of the most popular caves in the region

- Location within Czech Republic
- Location: South Moravian Region, Czech Republic
- Nearest city: Blansko
- Area: 92 km^{2} (36 sq mi)
- Website: www.moravskykras.net/en/moravian-karst.html

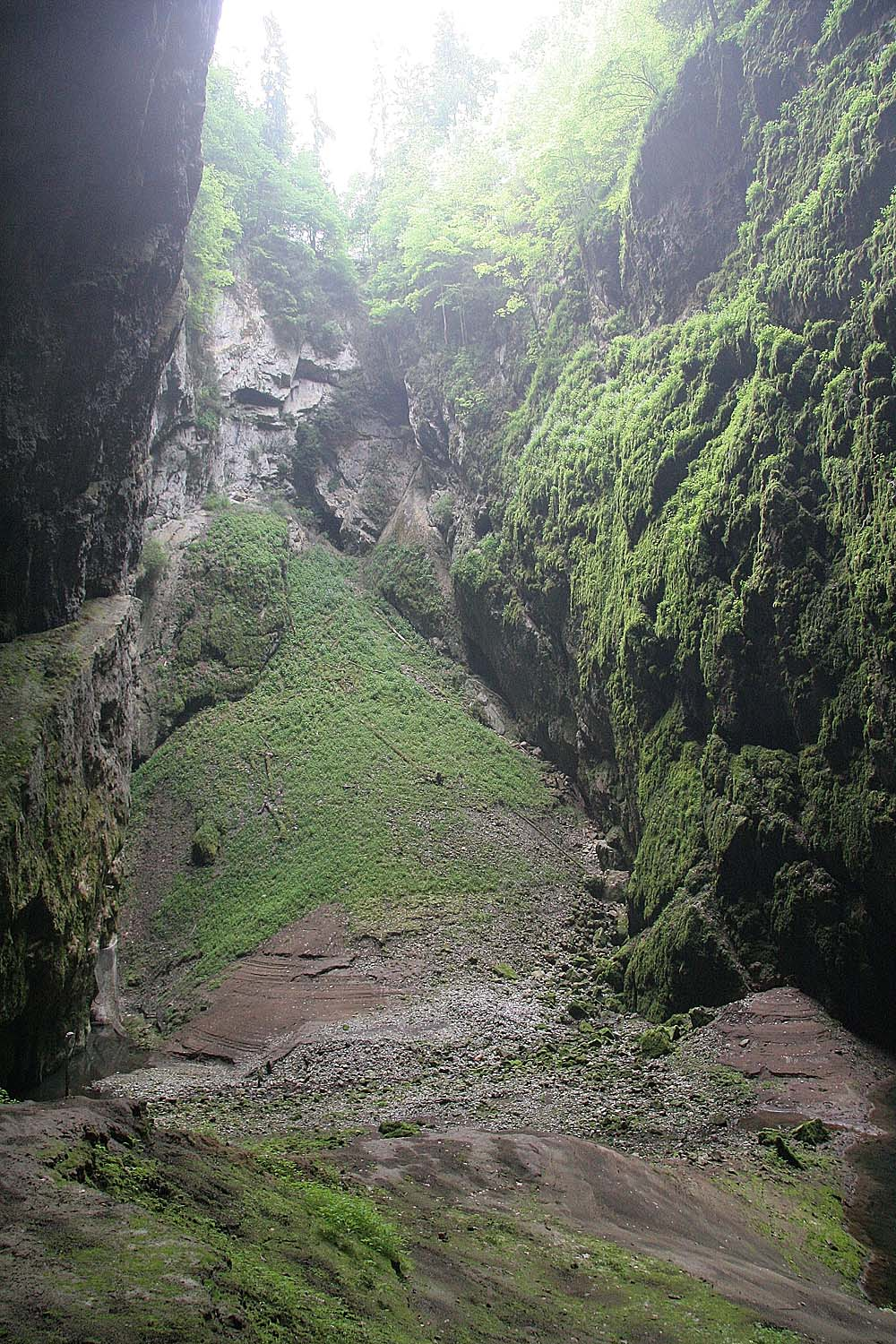
Macocha Gorge

The Moravian Karst (Czech: Moravský kras) is a karst landscape and protected landscape area to the north of Brno in the South Moravian Region of the Czech Republic. It encompasses a number of notable geological features, including roughly 1100 caverns and gorges and covers an area of roughly 92 km^{2}.

As of 2025, five of the cave systems (Punkva Caves (discovered by Karel Absolon), Balcarka Cave, Kateřinská Cave, Výpustek Cave and Sloupsko-šošůvské Caves+Kůlna Cave) are open for public tours; another - Amatérská Cave, Býčí skála Cave or Stránská skála (out of the border) only for science exploration.

This region is also home to one of the most important single geological features in the Czech Republic, the Macocha Abyss, a gorge 138 m deep, which was formed when the ceiling of a cave chamber collapsed. Macocha Abyss is also the place where the Punkva River begins to run underground through the Punkva cave system, and two small pools of water are visible at the surface.

The Moravian Karst is a popular tourist attraction in the local area, and large numbers of tourists visit in the summer months. In addition to caverns, the protected landscape area contains well-marked bicycle trails and hiking paths to explore.

On October, 2025, it was reported that the Czech government is intending to nominate the Moravian Karst region, especially the he Punkva and Kateřinská caves along with the Macocha Abyss, to receive a UNESCO World Heritage status.

== See also ==
- Punkva Caves
- Macocha Gorge
- Výpustek Cave
- Kůlna Cave
- Býčí skála Cave
- Amatérská Cave
- Stránská skála
- Brno Highlands
- Jindřich Wankel
- Karel Absolon
