= Stránská skála =

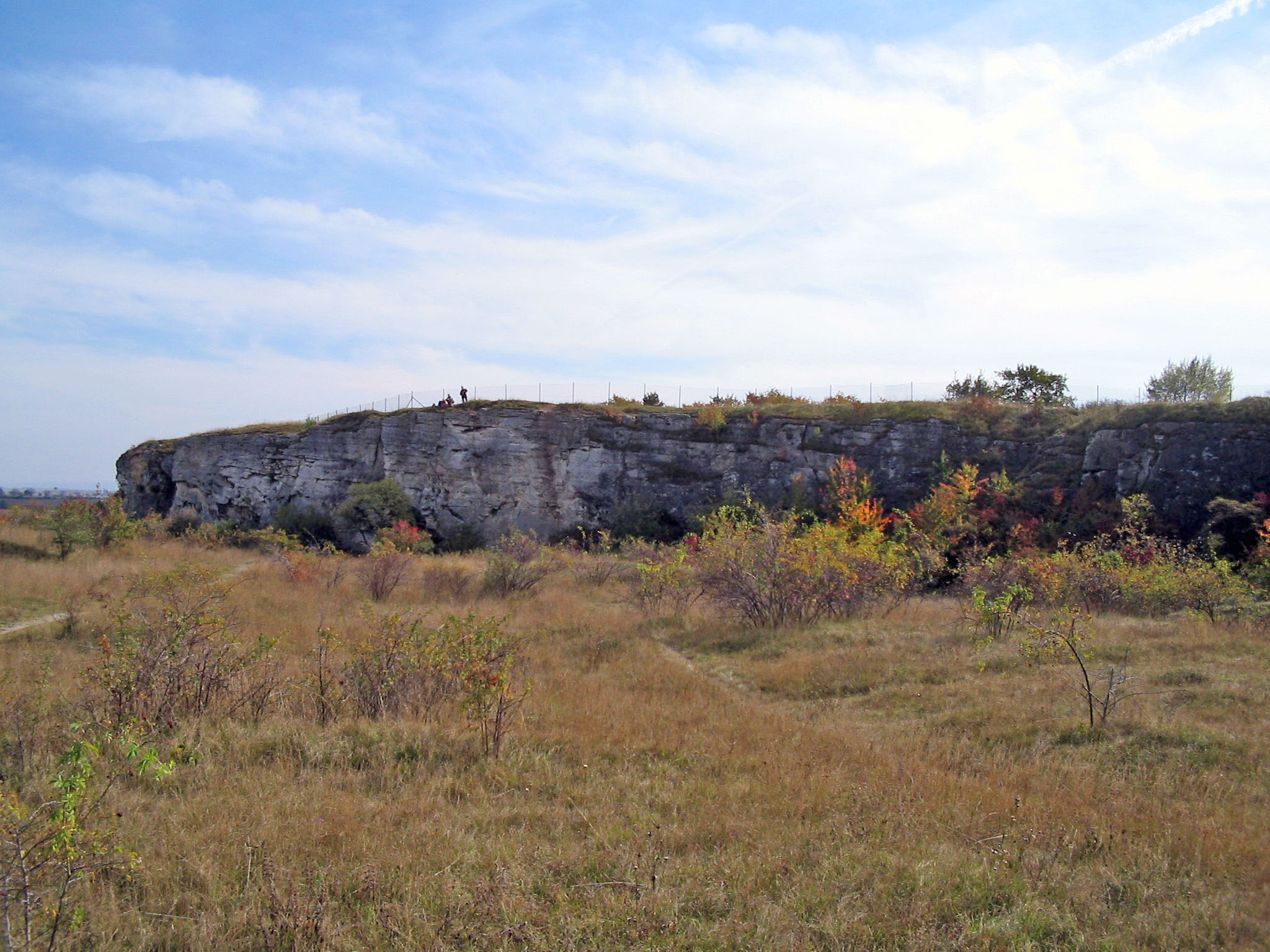
- Toppath on Stránská skála

Highest point
- Elevation: 310 m (1,020 ft)
- Coordinates: 49°11′26.05″N 16°40′32.66″E

Dimensions
- Area: 15.54 ha (38.4 acres)

Geography
- Location within Czech Republic
- Location: Brno, Czech Republic
- Parent range: Dyje–Svratka Valley

Geology
- Rock age: Middle Pleistocene

Stránská skála is a hill and a national nature monument in Brno in the Czech Republic. It refers to a Mid-Pleistocene-Cromerian interglacial most important paleontological site in Central Europe.

== Location ==
Stránská skála is situated in the northern part of the Brno-Slatina district, in the eastern part of Brno. From the geomorphological point of view, Stránská skála belongs to the Dyje–Svratka Valley within the Outer Subcarpathia.

== Description ==
Stránská skála is dating to approximately 600,000 BP, as supported by paleomagnetic dating. It is a 1,500 m (4,900 ft) long and 400 m (1,300 ft) wide hill, built from Jurassic limestone, especially Callovian-Oxfordian, built from light brown Caleidocrinus (Crinoid) mostly and Brachiopoddes and Coral and more other types of limestones rich of fossil fauna as well. Its northwestern slope is composed from karstified limestone cliffs in which numerous fossiliferous fissures and caves were found. Approximately 48 meter (157 ft) of this slope are covered by complex talus fan.

== Paleontology ==
At this place extensive excavations were made by paleontologist Rudolf Musil and his colleagues in 1956–1968 which yielded rich paleothological material, including Homotherium moravicum teeth and approximately 1600 bones and bone fragments of birds from 23 families, 51 genera and 68 species. Earlier (1943) were Ursus deningeri discovered, and later rich spectrum of coastal animal fossils such as ostracods, bivalves and fishes. The other terrestrial fossil animals are represented mostly of snakes. The site is unique in that it has been a particularly abundant source of prehistoric artifacts (especially stone tools) dating from the Acheulean period, over Bohunician to Neolitics and Eneolitics, which spanned roughly 27,000 to 20,000 B.C. In addition to the abundance of various stone tools were discovered also fireplaces (the older one 250.000 BP).

== Gallery ==
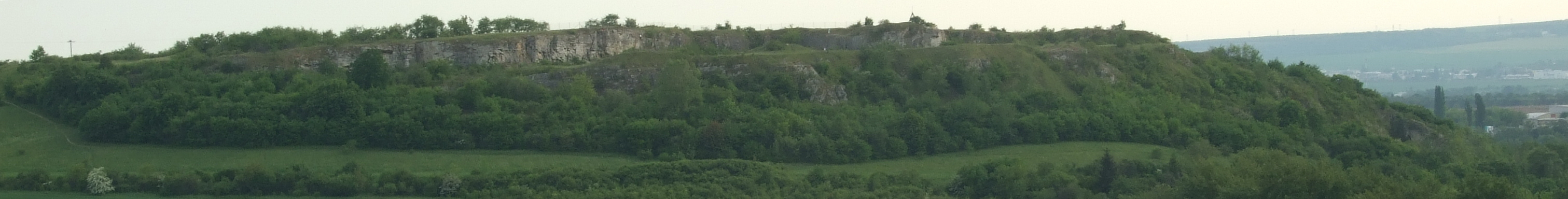
General view of Stránská skála

== See also ==
- Homotherium
- Ursus deningeri
