= Brno Highlands =

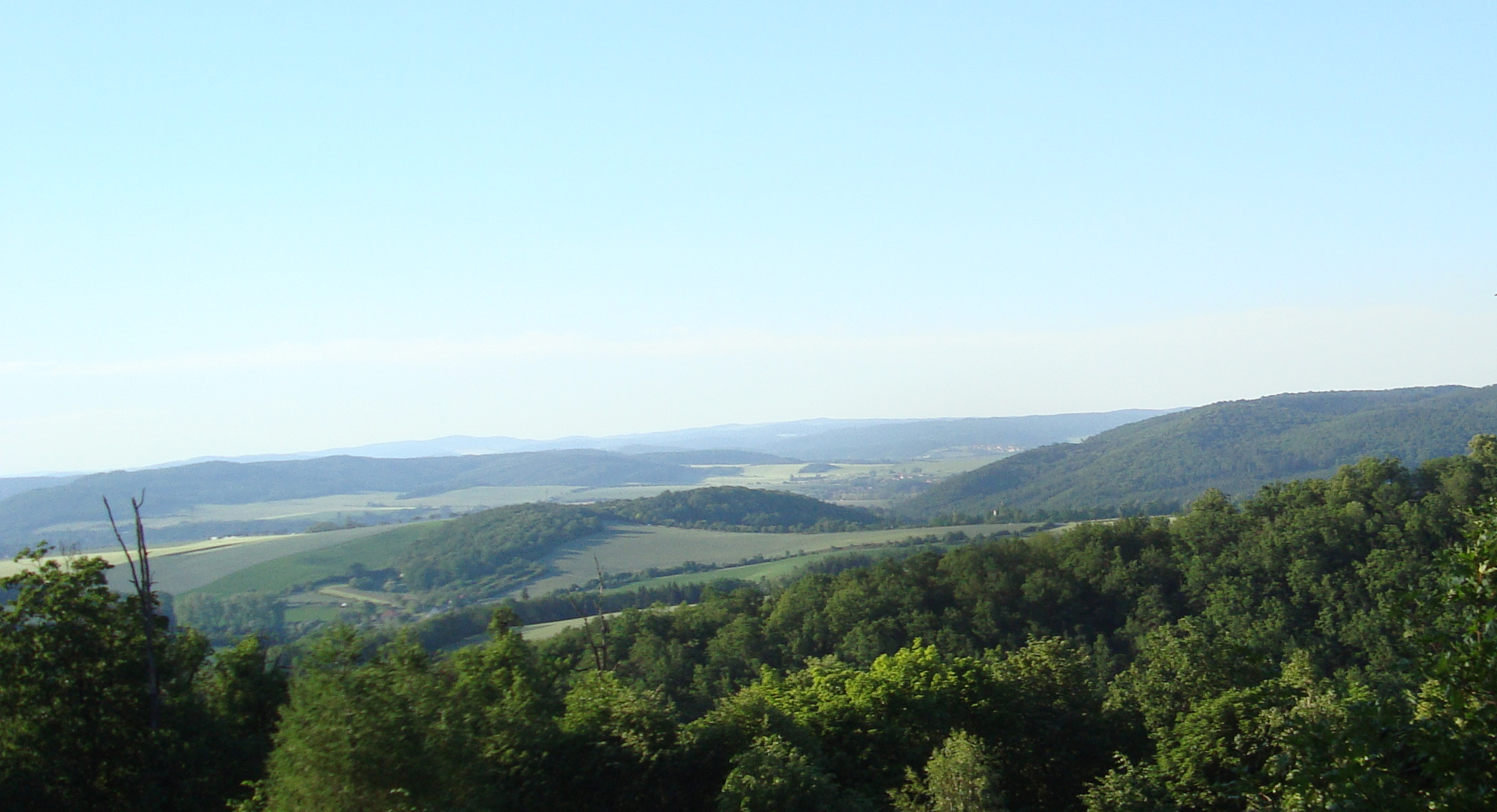
- Kalvárie, mid part of Brno Highlands

Highest point
- Peak: Skalky
- Elevation: 735 m (2,411 ft)

Dimensions
- Length: 85 km (53 mi)
- Area: 1,963 km^{2} (758 mi^{2})

Geography
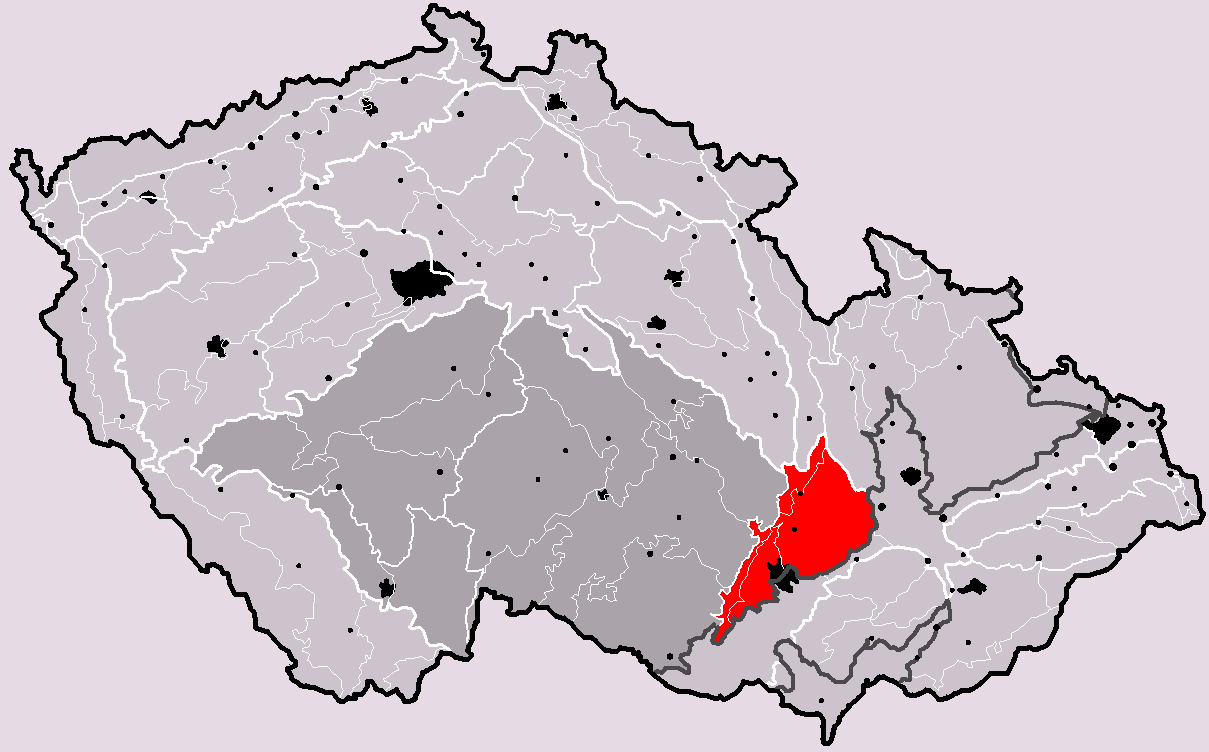
- Brno Highlands in the geomorphological system of the Czech Republic
- Country: Czech Republic
- Regions: South Moravian; Olomouc; Pardubice
- Range coordinates: 49°18′N 16°39′E
- Parent range: Bohemian Massif

The Brno Highlands (Czech: Brněnská vrchovina) are highlands and a geomorphological macroregion of the Czech Republic. It is located mainly in the South Moravian Region, but it also extends into the Olomouc and Pardubice regions.

== Geomorphology ==
The Brno Highlands is a macroregion of the Bohemian-Moravian Subprovince within the Bohemian Massif. It is further subdivided into the mesoregions of Boskovice Furrow, Bobrava Highlands and Drahany Highlands. The highest part is Drahany Higlands, which include Skalky – the highest peak of Brno Highlands at 735 metres (2,411 ft) above sea level. The Bobrava Highlands do not exceed 479 metres (1,572 ft). The Boskovice Furrow is a depression with an average elevation of 335 metres (1,099 ft) and the highest point being at 553 metres (1,814 ft).

== Geography ==
The Brno Highlands rise to the north of the Thaya between Miroslav, and the Prostějov and Litovel in the north. The highlands have an area of 1,963 square kilometres (758 sq mi) and an average height of 413 metres (1,355 ft).

Among the main river flowing through the area are Svitava, Svratka and Jihlava.

Part of the city of Brno, which gave it its name, is located within the Brno Higlands. Other large settlements in the territory are the towns of Blansko, Boskovice, Kuřim, Ivančice, Letovice, Rosice and Adamov.

== Geology and pedology ==
Southeast border line of Brno Highlands is also main border of two large geological provinces: Extendet crust (Bohemian Massif) and Orogeny (Carpatien)

The primary composition of the range is Carboniferous granodiorite and flysch.

== Gallery ==
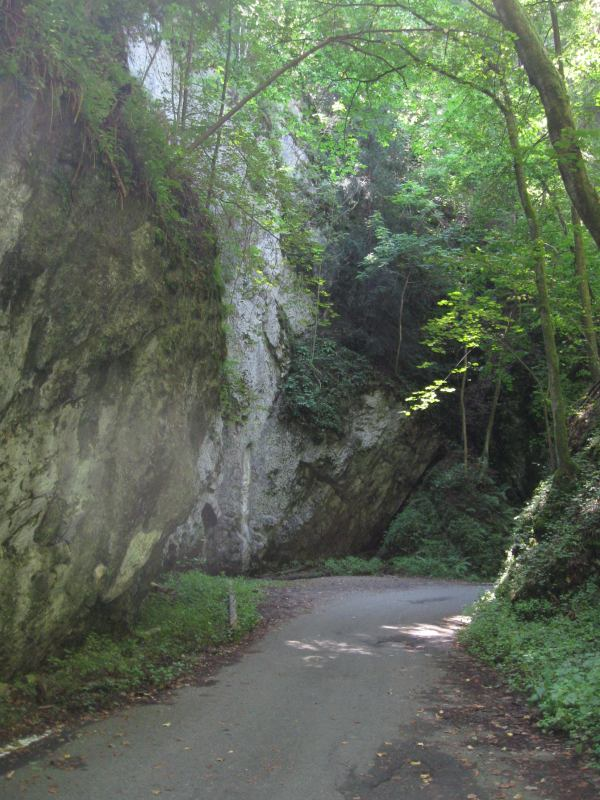
Suchý žleb canyon

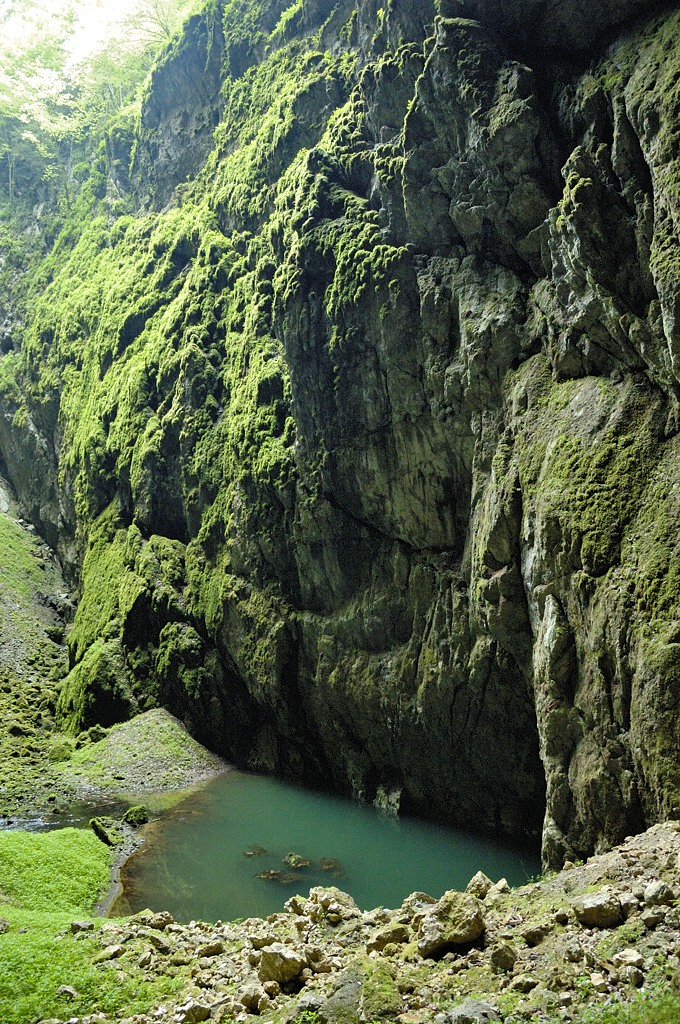
Macocha Gorge

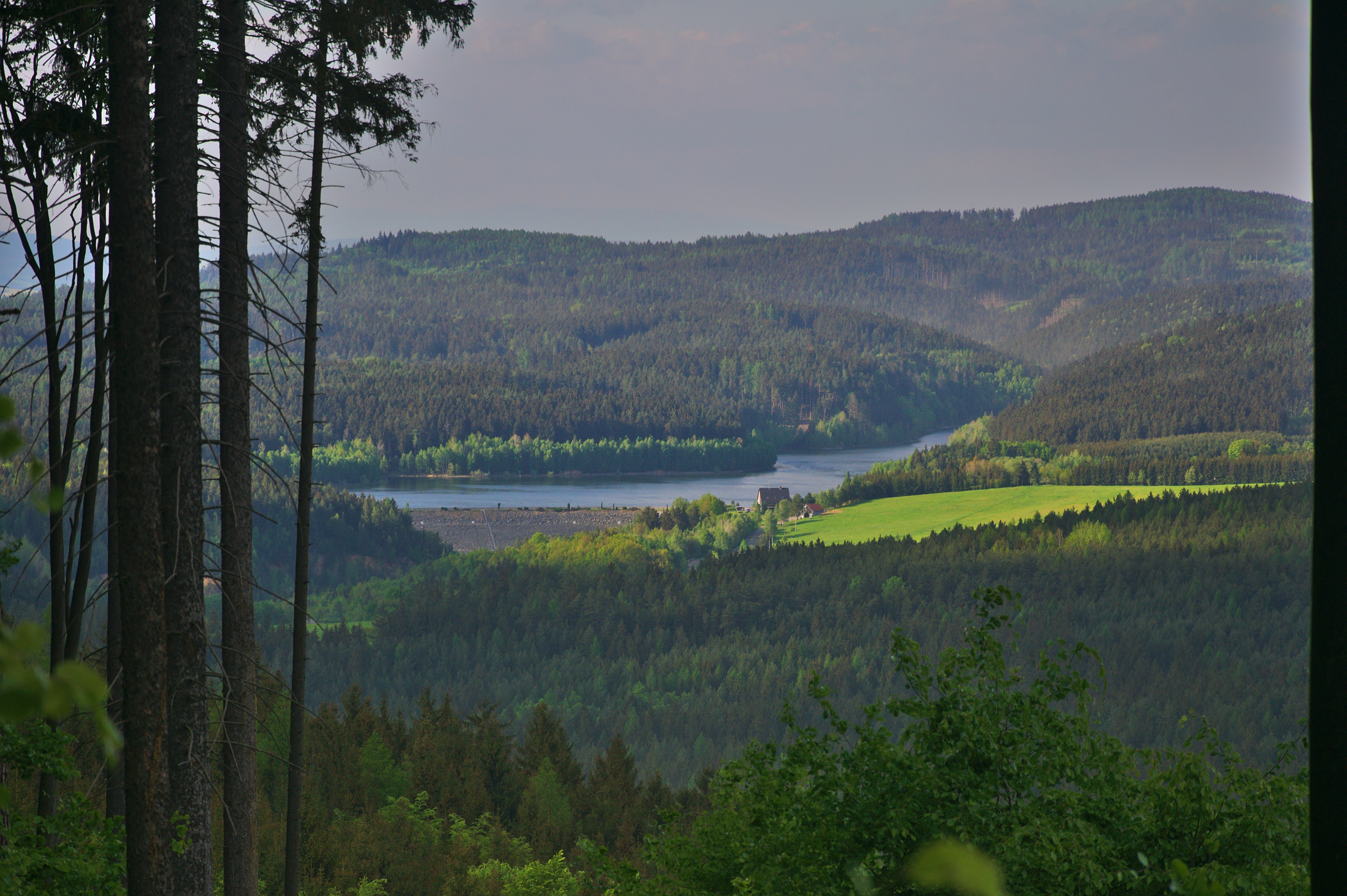
Boskovice Reservoir

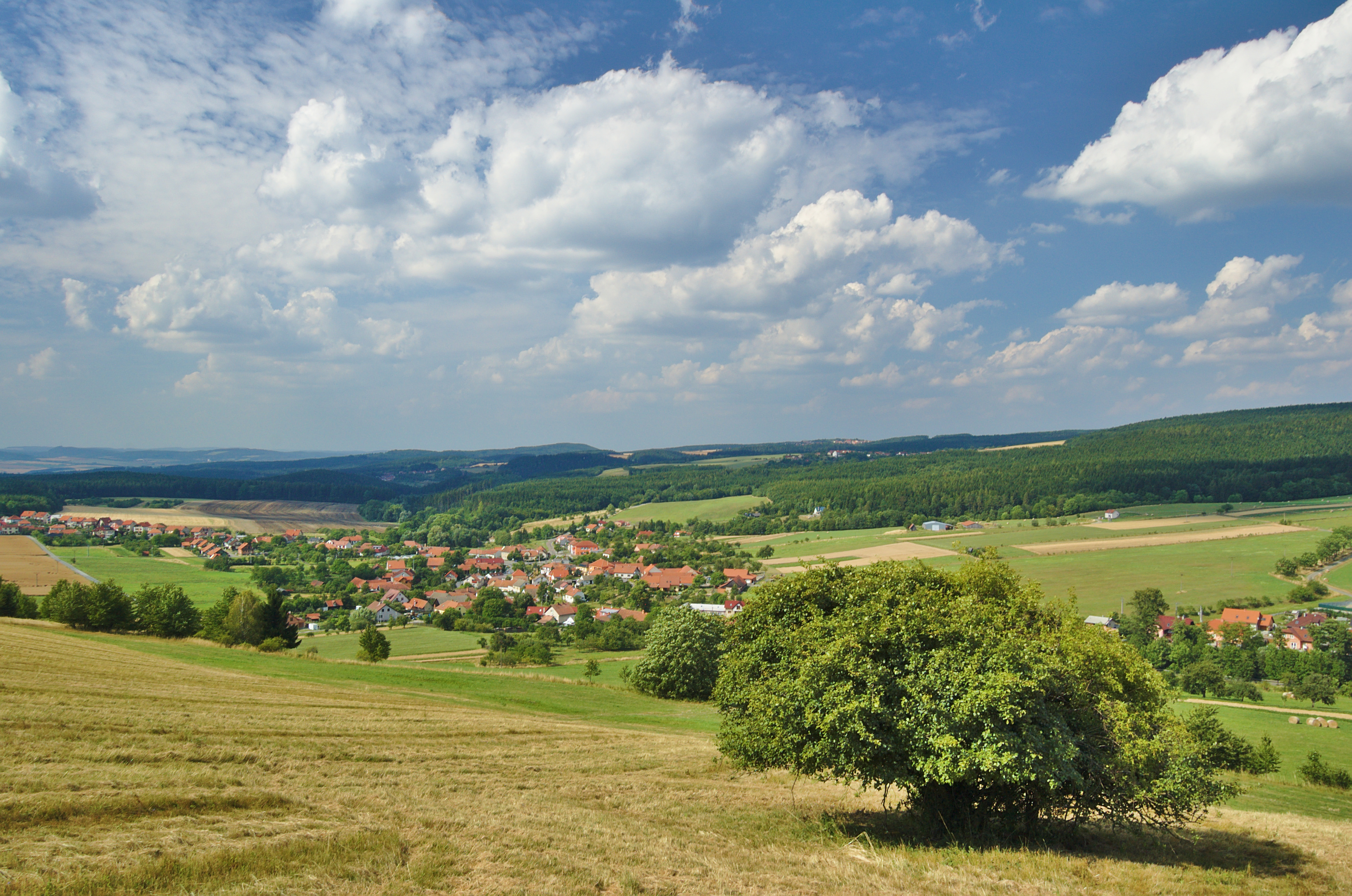
Valchovský prolom
