= The Unbearable Lightness of Being (soundtrack) =

The Unbearable Lightness of Being Original Soundtrack Recording

Soundtrack album by Various artists
- Released: 1988
- Genre: Soundtrack
- Length: 53:50
- Label: Fantasy

The Unbearable Lightness of Being Original Soundtrack Recording is the official soundtrack album for the 1988 film of the same name, an adaptation of the Milan Kundera novel. The soundtrack is composed of various classical pieces by Czech composer Leoš Janáček as well as a Czech language translation of the Beatles' song "Hey Jude", performed by Marta Kubišová, and the traditional Czechoslovak folk song "Joj, Joj, Joj", performed by Jarmila Šuláková and Vojtěch Jochec.

== Background ==
According to a liner essay by Grover Sales, the idea of utilising the music of Leoš Janáček was first suggested by Milan Kundera towards the beginning of the film's production. Kundera's father was a concert musician and a proponent of Janáček's music. The two non-classical pieces in the film, a Czech version of "Hey Jude" and the traditional Czechoslovak song "Joj, Joj, Joj", were chosen to reflect the utilisation of rock and jazz music as tools of protest against the Soviet government during the period surrounding the Prague Spring.

== Track listing ==
| No. | Title | Music | Performer(s) | Length |
|---|---|---|---|---|
| 1. | "Fairy Tale, III. Allegro" | Leoš Janáček | Jerry Grossman, Diane Walsh | 2:47 |
| 2. | "The Holy Virgin of Frydek (Grave)" (from "On the Overgrown Path", Set 1) | Janáček | Ivan Klánský | 3:24 |
| 3. | "In the Mist, II. Molto adagio" | Janáček | Ivan Moravec | 4:36 |
| 4. | "Hey Jude" | Lennon-McCartney | Marta Kubišová | 5:37 |
| 5. | "Joj, Joj, Joj" | A traditional Czechoslovak folksong | Jarmila Šuláková, Vojtěch Jochec | 3:06 |
| 6. | "String Quartet No.2" ("Intimate Pages", IV. Allegro) | Janáček | The Smetana Quartet | 6:44 |
| 7. | "Sonata for Violin and Piano, IV. Adagio" | Janáček | Sergiu Luca, Paul Schoenfield | 4:37 |
| 8. | "The Bird of Ill Omen Lingers On (Andante)" (from "On the Overgrown Path", Set 1) | Janáček | Klánský | 3:49 |
| 9. | "On the Overgrown Path, Set 2" (4th Movement, Allegro) | Janáček | Klánský | 4:13 |
| 10. | "String Quartet No. 1" (Inspired by Tolstoy's "Kreutzer Sonata", III. Con Moto—Vivace—Andante) | Janáček | The Smetana Quartet | 3:29 |
| 11. | "A Blown-Away Leaf: Andante" (from "On the Overgrown Path") | Janáček | Moravec | 3:35 |
| 12. | "Goodnight" (from "On the Overgrown Path") | Janáček | Radoslav Kvapil | 3:13 |
| 13. | "Idyll for String Orchestra, V. Adagio" | Janáček | The Los Angeles Chamber Orchestra | 3:28 |
| Total length: | | | | 53:50 |
