= Psohlavci =

Psohlavci may refer to:

- Psohlavci , an 1894 novel by Alois Jirásek
- Dog's Heads, a 1955 Czech drama film, based on the novel
- Psohlavci (opera), a Czech-language opera, based on the novel
