= Gabriela Horvátová =

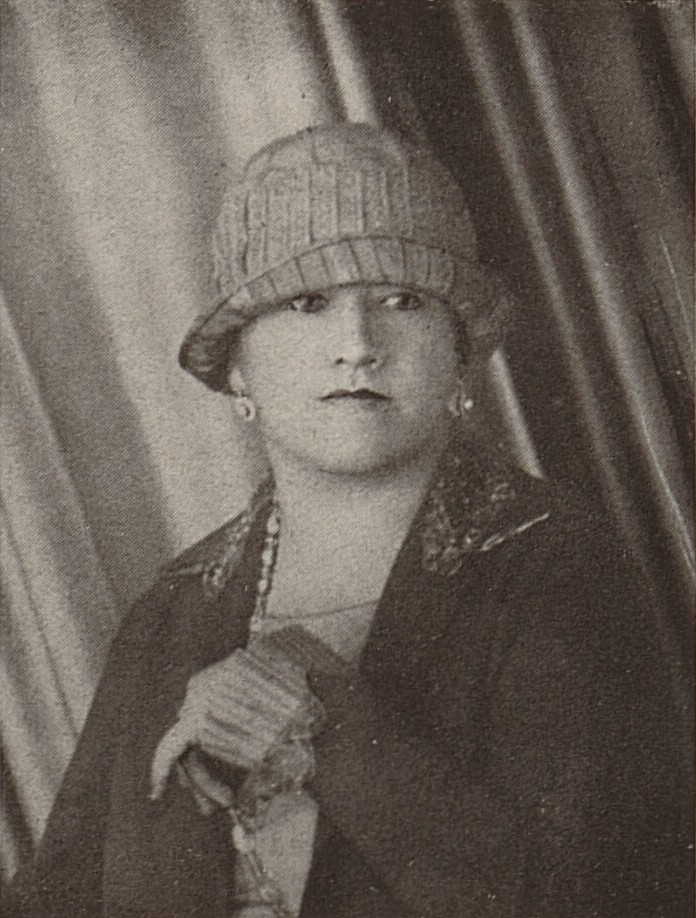
Horvátová in 1927

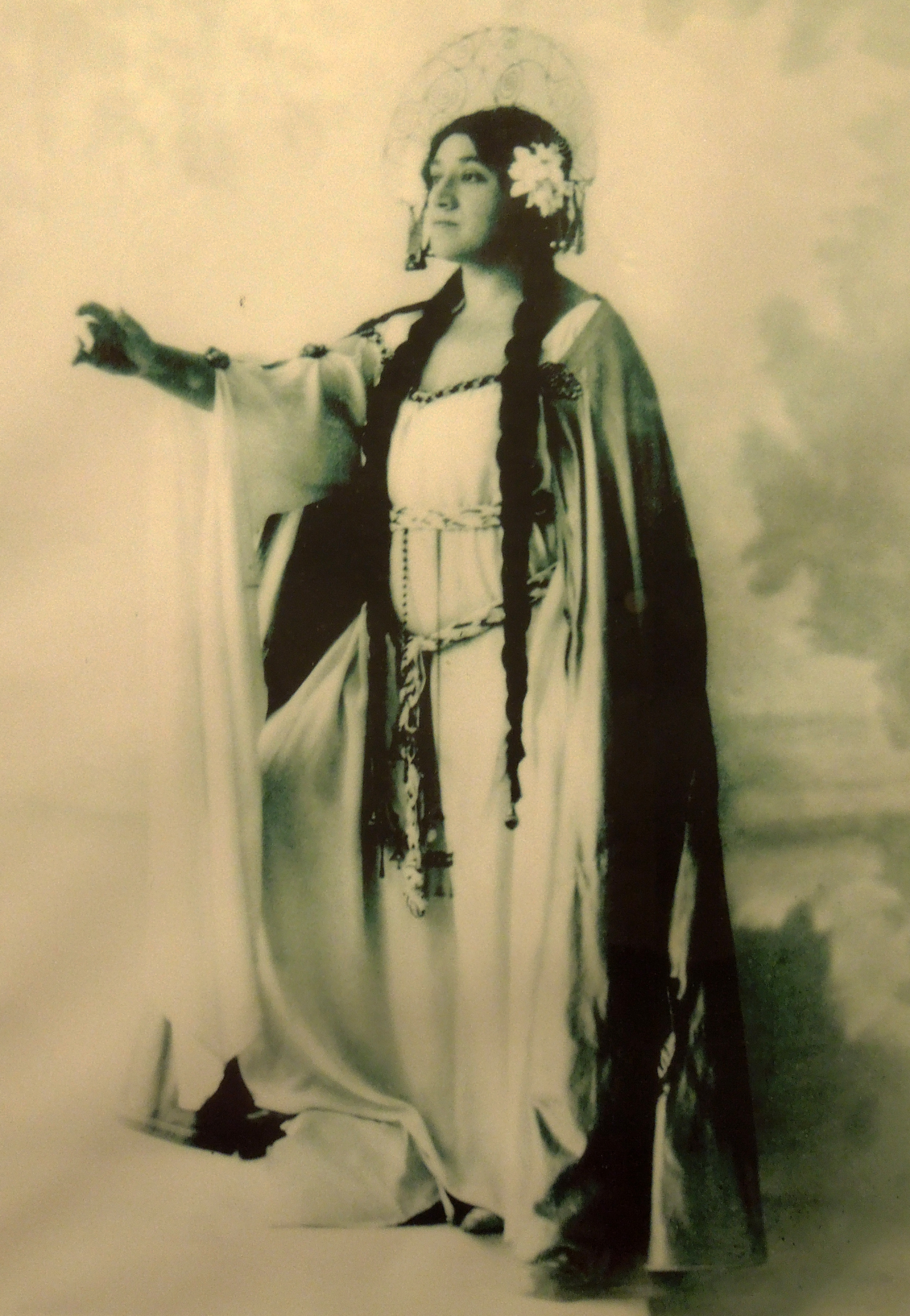
Horváthová as Libuše (Bedřich Smetana), 1915

Gabriela Horvátová (25 December 1877 – 29 November 1967) was a Croatian-Czech mezzo-soprano. She is best known for performing the part of the Kostelnička in the Prague premiere of Jenůfa in 1916, (12 years after the world première in Brno, in 1904) and for having become closely involved with the opera's composer Leoš Janáček.

== Life ==
Gabriela Horvátová was born on 25 December 1877 in Varaždin, Croatia.

Although she had earlier studied the piano, she entered the Zemnice Institute of Music in Zagreb and trained in solo singing, graduating in 1899. She sang as a guest at opera houses in Zagreb, Graz, Düsseldorf, Cologne and Vienna, before going to Prague in 1903, where she was engaged to sing with the Prague National Theatre Opera by Karel Kovařovic. Here she was performing in the Czech language within a month. She sang many roles in operas by Zdeněk Fibich and other Czech composers; she also sang several Wagnerian roles.

She covered the roles of contralto, mezzo-soprano and soprano. For 27 years she was a member of the Prague National Theatre Opera; she was also a successful silent film actress.

Gabriela Horvátová died on 29 November 1967 in Prague.

== Sources ==
- Martín Bermúdez, Santiago (2015). El siglo de Jenůfa. Las óperas que cambiaron todo (1900–1950) [Jenůfa's Century: The Operas That Changed Everything (1900–1950)]. Ediciones Cumbres. ISBN 978-84-943713-9-4 – via casadellibro.com.
- "Padesát let od úmrtí první pražské Kostelničky" [Fifty years since the death of the first Prague Kostelnička]. operaplus.cz. 28 November 2017.
