= Leoš Janáček =

Czech composer (1854–1928)

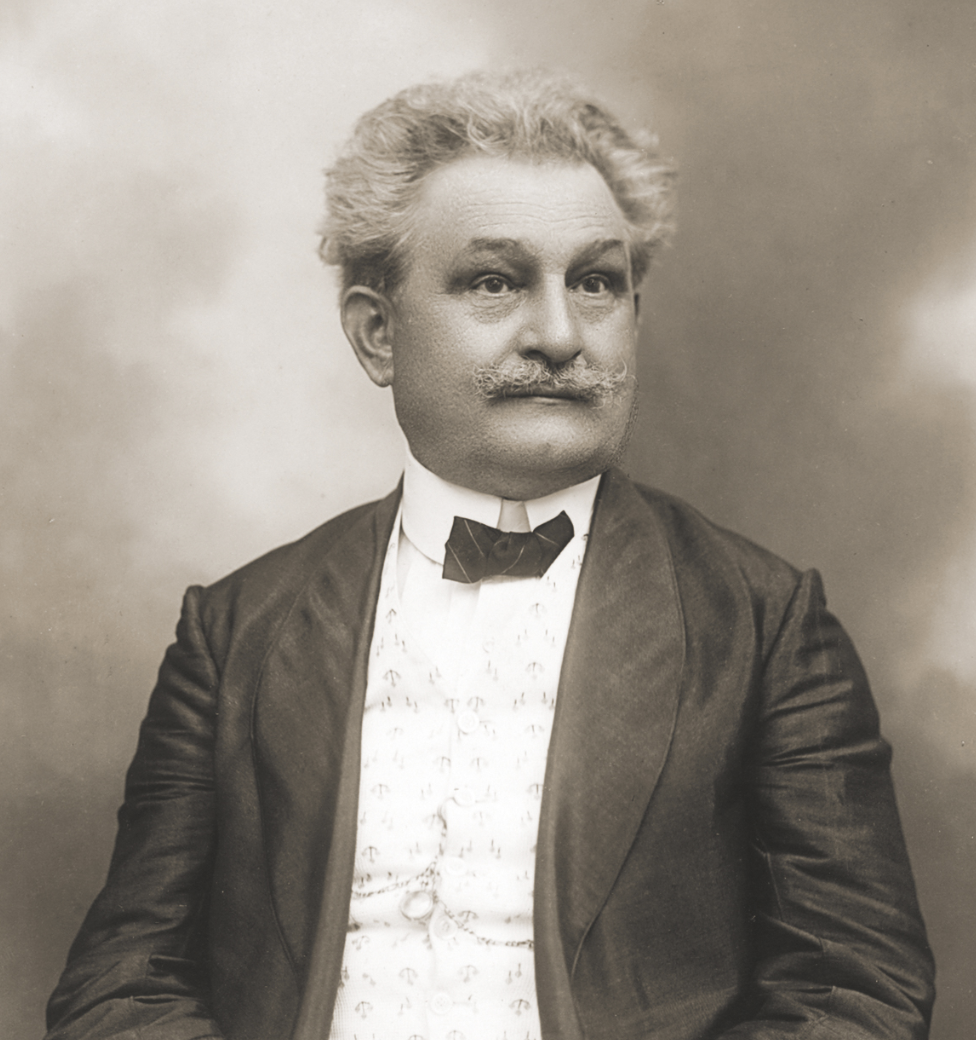
- Janáček in 1914
- Born: 3 July 1854; Hukvaldy, Moravia, Austrian Empire
- Died: 12 August 1928 (aged 74); Ostrava, Czechoslovakia
- Occupations: Composer; music theorist; folklorist; teacher
- Works: List of compositions
- Spouse: Zdenka Janáčková
- Children: Olga (1882–1903), Vladimír (1888–1890)

Leoš Janáček (Czech: [ˈlɛoʃ ˈjanaːtʃɛk]; 3 July 1854 – 12 August 1928) was a Czech composer, music theorist, folklorist, and teacher. He was inspired by Moravian and other Slavic music, including Eastern European folk music, to create an original, modern musical style.

Born in Hukvaldy, Janáček demonstrated musical talent at an early age and was educated in Brno, Prague, Leipzig, and Vienna. He then returned to live in Brno, where he married his pupil Zdenka Schulzová and devoted himself mainly to folkloristic research. His earlier musical output was influenced by contemporaries such as Antonín Dvořák, but around the turn of the century he began to incorporate his earlier studies of national folk music, as well as his transcriptions of "speech melodies" of spoken language, to create a modern, highly original synthesis. The death of his daughter Olga in 1903 had a profound effect on his musical output; these notable transformations were first evident in the opera Jenůfa (often called the "Moravian national opera"), which premiered in 1904 in Brno.

In the following years, Janáček became frustrated with a lack of recognition from Prague, but this was finally relieved by the success of a revised edition of Jenůfa at the National Theatre in 1916, which gave Janáček access to the world's great opera stages. Janáček's later works are his most celebrated. They include operas such as Káťa Kabanová and The Cunning Little Vixen, the Sinfonietta, the Glagolitic Mass, the rhapsody Taras Bulba, two string quartets, and other chamber works. Many of Janáček's later works were influenced by Czech and Russian literature, his pan-Slavist sentiments, and his infatuation with Kamila Stösslová.

After his death in 1928, Janáček's work was heavily promoted on the world opera stage by the Australian conductor Charles Mackerras, who also restored some of his compositions to their original, unrevised forms. In his homeland he inspired a new generation of Czech composers including several of his students. Today he is considered one of the most important Czech composers, along with Dvořák and Bedřich Smetana.

== Biography ==
=== 1854–1872: Early life and family ===
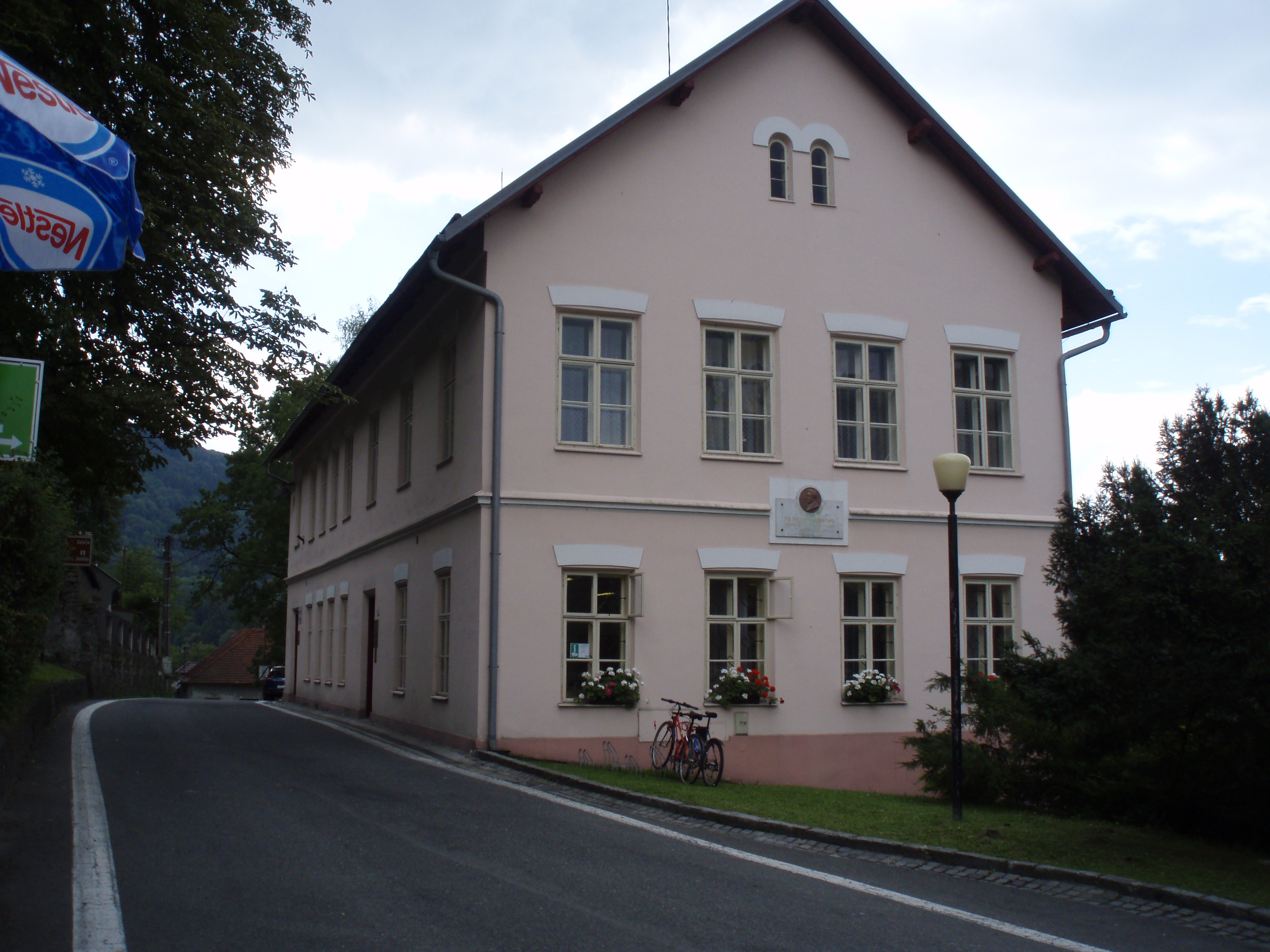
The school in Hukvaldy, Janáček's birth house

Leoš Janáček, son of schoolmaster Jiří Janacek and Amálie Janáčková (née Grulichová), was born in Hukvaldy, Moravia (then part of the Austrian Empire) on 3 July 1854. He was born with six surviving siblings, and baptised as Leo Eugen. He was a gifted child in a family of limited means, and showed an early musical talent in choral singing. His father wanted him to follow the family tradition and become a teacher, but he deferred to Janáček's obvious musical abilities.

In 1865, young Janáček enrolled as a ward of the foundation of the St Thomas's Abbey, Brno, where he took part in choral singing under Pavel Křížkovský and occasionally played the organ. One of his classmates, František Neumann, later described Janáček as an "excellent pianist, who played Beethoven symphonies perfectly in a piano duet with a classmate, under Křížkovský's supervision". Křížkovský found him a problematic and wayward student but recommended his entry to the Prague Organ School. Janáček later remembered Křížkovský as a great conductor and teacher.

=== 1873–1880: Education and early career ===
Janáček originally intended to study piano and organ but eventually devoted himself to composition. He wrote his first vocal compositions while choirmaster of the Svatopluk Artisan's Association (1873–1876). In 1874, he enrolled at the Prague organ school, under František Skuherský and František Blažek. His student days in Prague were impoverished; with no piano in his room, he had to make do with a keyboard drawn on his tabletop. His criticism of Skuherský's performance of the Gregorian mass was published in the March 1875 edition of the journal Cecilie and led to his expulsion from the school, but Skuherský relented, and on 24 July 1875 Janáček graduated with the best results in his class.

On his return to Brno he earned a living as a music teacher, and conducted various amateur choirs. From 1876 he taught music at Brno's Teachers' Institute. Among his pupils there was Zdenka Schulzová, daughter of Emilian Schulz, the Institute director. She was later to be Janáček's wife. In 1876, he also became a piano student of Amálie Wickenhauserová-Nerudová, with whom he co-organized chamber concertos and performed in concerts over the following two years. In February 1876, he was voted Choirmaster of the Beseda brněnská Philharmonic Society. Apart from an interruption from 1879 to 1881, he remained its choirmaster and conductor until 1888.

From October 1879 to February 1880, he studied piano, organ, and composition at the Leipzig Conservatory. While there, he composed Thema con variazioni for piano in B-flat, subtitled Zdenka's Variations. Dissatisfied with his teachers (among them Oscar Paul and Leo Grill), and denied a studentship with Camille Saint-Saëns in Paris, Janáček moved on to the Vienna Conservatory, where from April to June 1880, he studied composition with Franz Krenn. He concealed his opposition to Krenn's neo-romanticism, but he quit Josef Dachs's classes and further piano study after he was criticised for his piano style and technique. He submitted a violin sonata (now lost) to a Vienna Conservatory competition, but the judges rejected it as being "too academic". Janáček left the conservatory in June 1880, disappointed despite Franz Krenn's very complimentary personal report. One of his classmates and friends in Vienna was composer and pianist Josef Weiss.

Janáček returned to Brno where, on 13 July 1881, he married his young pupil, Zdenka Schulzová. Their daughter Olga was born in August 1882. In 1888, Olga contracted rheumatic fever, which would lead to her early death at the age of 20. Within three months of Olga's illness, their second child, a son Vladimir, was born. Vladimir lived only until November 1890, when he died of scarlet fever.

=== 1881–1899: Folkloristic work and early compositions ===
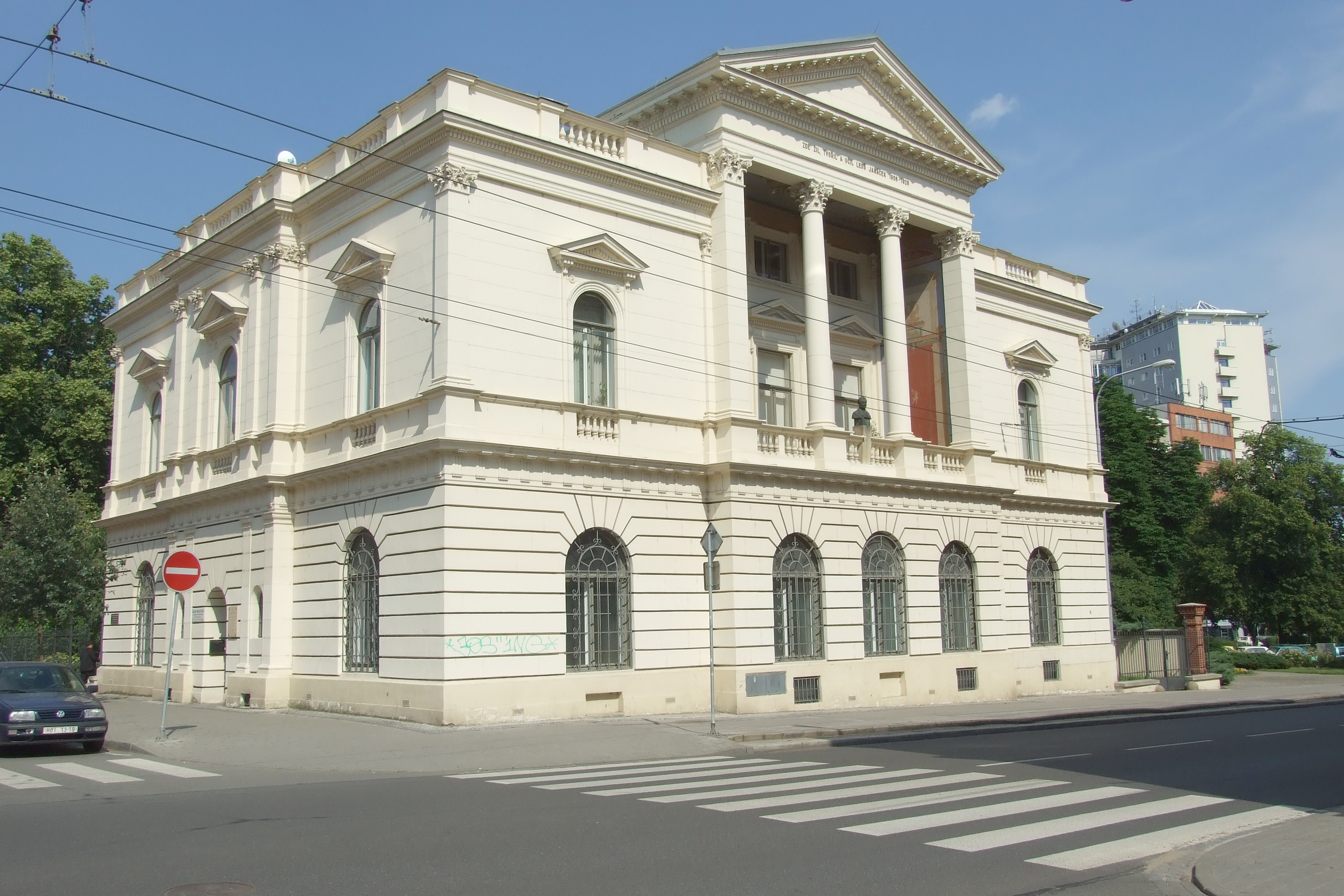
Former organ school in Brno. Janáček lived in a small house in the garden of the villa. His garden house is today's Leoš Janáček Memorial.

In 1881, Janáček founded and was appointed director of the organ school, and held this post until 1919, when the school became the Brno Conservatory. In the mid-1880s, Janáček began composing more systematically. Among other works, he created the Four male-voice choruses (1886), dedicated to Antonín Dvořák, and his first opera, Šárka (1887–1888). During this period he began to collect and study folk music, songs and dances. In the early months of 1887, he sharply criticized the comic opera The Bridegrooms, by Czech composer Karel Kovařovic, in a Hudební listy journal review: "Which melody stuck in your mind? Which motif? Is this dramatic opera? No, I would write on the poster: 'Comedy performed together with music', since the music and the libretto aren't connected to each other". Janáček's review apparently led to mutual dislike and later professional difficulties when Kovařovic, as director of the National Theatre in Prague, refused to stage Janáček's opera Jenůfa.

From the early 1890s, Janáček led the mainstream of folklorist activity in Moravia and Silesia, using a repertoire of folk songs and dances in orchestral and piano arrangements. Many of the tunes he used had been recorded by him but a second source was Xavera Běhálková who sent him 70 to 100 tunes that she had gathered from around the Haná region of central Moravia.

Most of his achievements in this field were published in 1899–1901 though his interest in folklore would be lifelong. His compositional work was still influenced by the declamatory, dramatic style of Smetana and Dvořák. He expressed very negative opinions on German neo-classicism and especially on Wagner in the Hudební listy journal, which he founded in 1884. The death of his second child, Vladimír, in 1890 was followed by an attempted opera, Beginning of the Romance (1891) and the cantata Amarus (1897).

=== 1900–1915: Difficult years ===
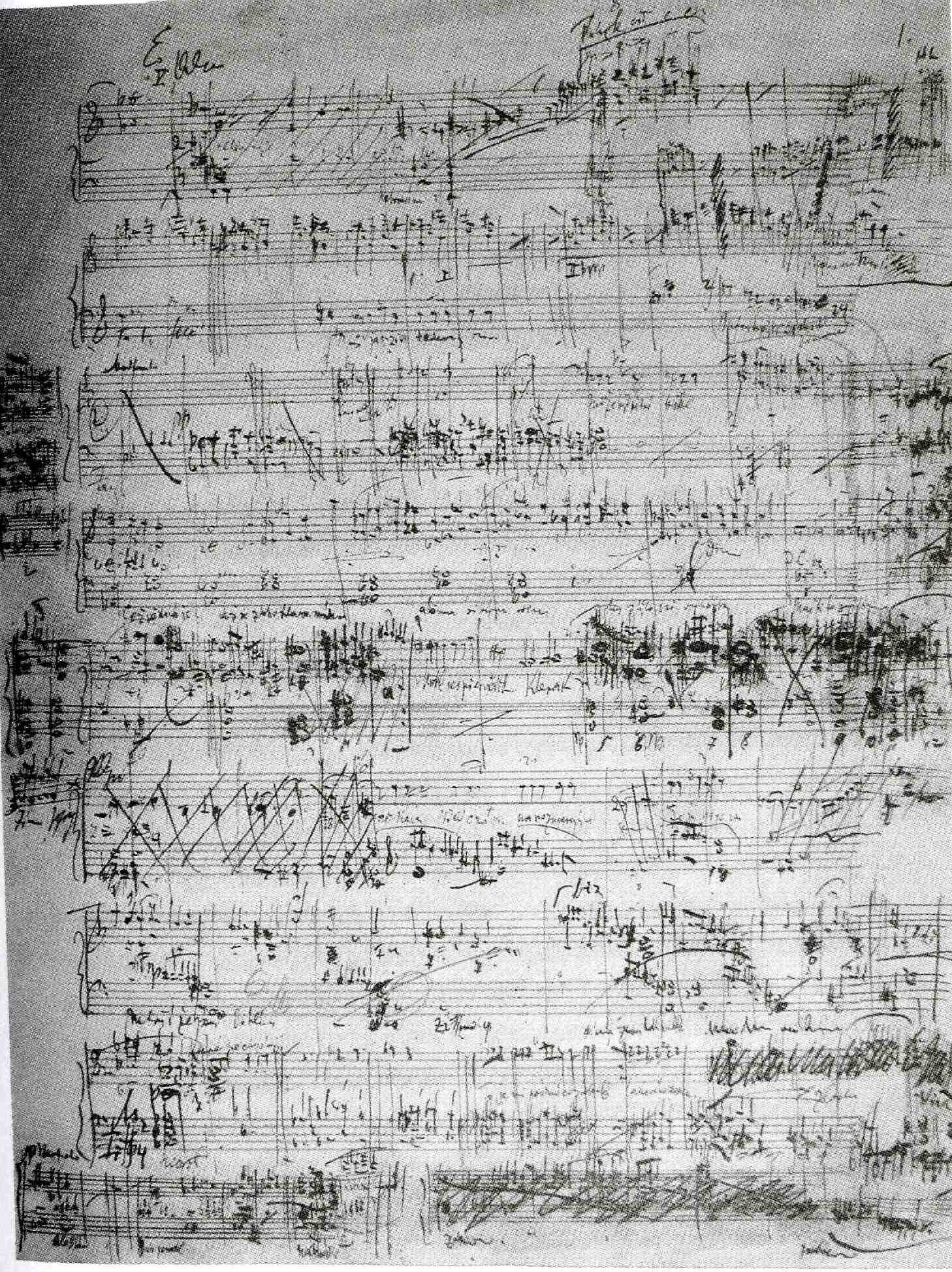
The only preserved page of the autograph manuscript of Janáček's Jenůfa

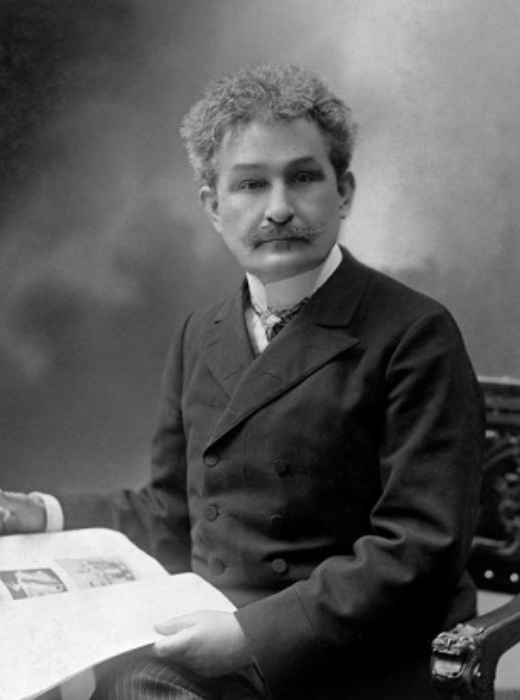
Janáček in 1904

In the first decade of the 20th century, Janáček composed choral church music including Otčenáš (Our Father, 1901), Constitues (1903) and Ave Maria (1904). In 1901, the first part of his piano cycle On an Overgrown Path was published and gradually became one of his most frequently-performed works. In 1902, Janáček visited Russia twice. On the first occasion he took his daughter Olga to Saint Petersburg, where she stayed to study Russian. Only three months later, he returned to Saint Petersburg with his wife because Olga had become very ill. They took her back to Brno, but her health worsened.

Janáček expressed his painful feelings for his daughter in a new work, his opera Jenůfa, in which the suffering of his daughter had transfigured into Jenůfa's. When Olga died in February 1903, Janáček dedicated Jenůfa to her memory. The opera was performed in Brno in 1904, with reasonable success, but Janáček felt this was no more than a provincial achievement. He aspired to recognition by the more influential Prague opera, but Jenůfa was refused there (twelve years passed before its first performance in Prague). Dejected and emotionally exhausted, Janáček went to Luhačovice spa to recover. There he met Kamila Urválková, whose love story supplied the theme for his next opera, Osud (Destiny).

In 1905, Janáček attended a demonstration in support of a Czech university in Brno, where the violent death of František Pavlík, a young joiner, at the hands of the police inspired his piano sonata, 1. X. 1905 (From The Street). The incident led him to further promote the anti-German and anti-Austrian ethos of the Russian Circle, which he had co-founded in 1897 and which would be officially banned by the Austrian police in 1915. In 1906, he approached the Czech poet Petr Bezruč, with whom he later collaborated, composing several choral works based on Bezruč's poetry. These included Kantor Halfar (1906), Maryčka Magdónova (1908), and 70.000 (1909).

Janáček's life in the first decade of the 20th century was complicated by personal and professional difficulties. He still yearned for artistic recognition from Prague. He destroyed some of his works, others remained unfinished. Nevertheless, he continued composing, and would create several remarkable choral, chamber, orchestral and operatic works, the most notable being the 1914 cantata, Věčné evangelium (The Eternal Gospel), Pohádka (Fairy tale) for 'cello and piano (1910), the 1912 piano cycle V mlhách (In the Mists), his violin sonata, and his first symphonic poem Šumařovo dítě (A Fiddler's Child). His fifth opera, Výlet pana Broučka do měsíce (The Excursions of Mr. Brouček to the Moon and to the 15th Century), composed from 1908 to 1917, has been characterized as the most "purely Czech in subject and treatment" of all of Janáček's operas.

=== 1916–1928: Breakthrough and masterworks ===
In 1916, he started a long professional and personal relationship with theatre critic, dramatist and translator Max Brod. In the same year, Jenůfa, revised by Kovařovic, was finally accepted by the National Theatre. Its performance in Prague in 1916 was a great success, and brought Janáček his first acclaim.

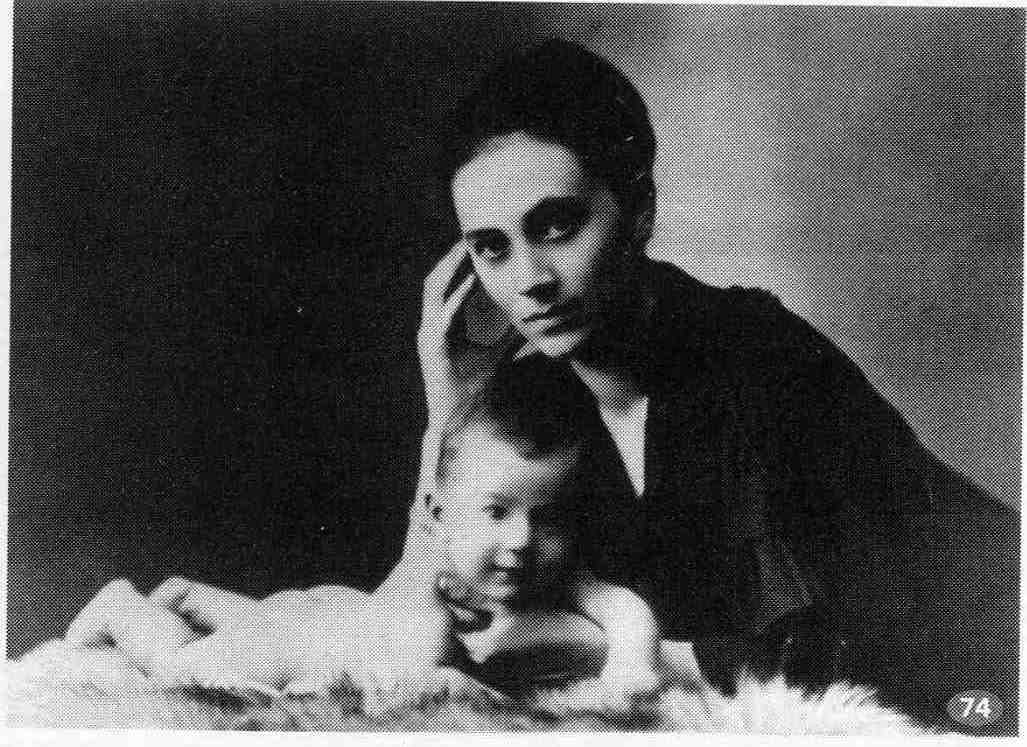
Kamila Stösslová with her son Otto in 1917

Following the Prague première, he began a relationship with singer Gabriela Horváthová, which led to his wife Zdenka's attempted suicide and their "informal" divorce. A year later (1917), he met Kamila Stösslová, a young married woman 38 years his junior, who was to inspire him for the remaining years of his life. He conducted an obsessive and (on his side at least) passionate correspondence with her, of nearly 730 letters. From 1917 to 1919, deeply inspired by Stösslová, he composed The Diary of One Who Disappeared. As he completed its final revision, he began his next 'Kamila' work, the opera Káťa Kabanová.

In 1920, Janáček retired from his post as director of the Brno Conservatory but continued to teach until 1925. In 1921, he attended a lecture by the Indian philosopher-poet Rabindranath Tagore and used a Tagore poem as the basis for the chorus The Wandering Madman (1922). In the early 1920s, Janáček completed his opera The Cunning Little Vixen, which had been inspired by a serialized novella by Rudolf Těsnohlídek in the newspaper Lidové noviny.

In Janáček's 70th year (1924), his biography was published by Max Brod, and he was interviewed by Olin Downes for The New York Times. In 1925, he retired from teaching but continued composing and was awarded the first honorary doctorate to be given by Masaryk University in Brno. In the spring of 1926, he created his Sinfonietta, a monumental orchestral work, which rapidly gained wide critical acclaim. In the same year, he went to England at the invitation of Rosa Newmarch. A number of his works were performed in London, including his first string quartet, the wind sextet Youth, and his violin sonata. Shortly after, and still in 1926, he started to compose a setting to an Old Church Slavonic text. The result was the large-scale orchestral Glagolitic Mass.

The world première of Janáček's lyrical Concertino for piano, two violins, viola, clarinet, French horn and bassoon took place in Brno in 1926. Around the same time, Janáček began work on a comparable chamber work for an even more unusual set of instruments, the Capriccio for piano left hand, flute, two trumpets, three trombones and tenor tuba, was written for pianist Otakar Hollmann, who lost the use of his right hand during World War I. It premièred in Prague on 2 March 1928.

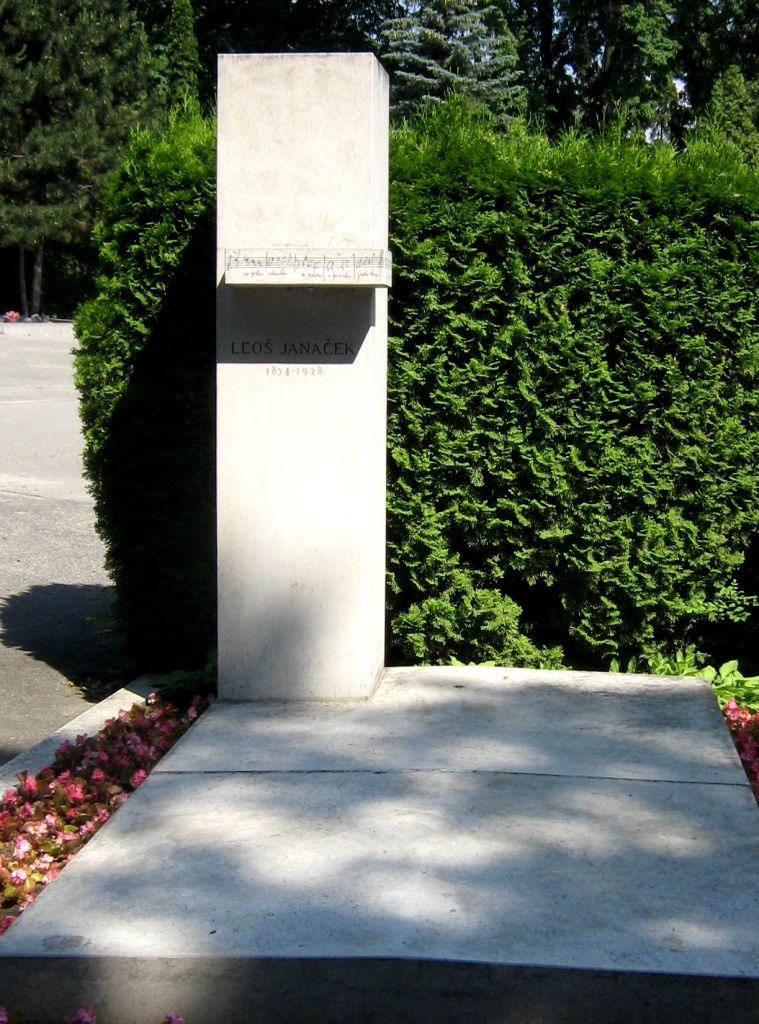
Janáček's grave, in Brno

In 1927 – the year of the Sinfonietta's first performances in New York, Berlin and Brno – he began to compose his final operatic work, From the House of the Dead, the third act of which would be found on his desk after his death. In January 1928, he began his second string quartet, the Intimate Letters, his "manifesto on love". Meanwhile, the Sinfonietta was performed in London, Vienna and Dresden. In his later years, Janáček became an international celebrity. He became a member of the Prussian Academy of Arts in Berlin in 1927, along with Arnold Schoenberg and Paul Hindemith.

=== Death and funeral ===
In August 1928, he took an excursion to Štramberk with Kamila Stösslová and her son Otto, but caught a chill which developed into pneumonia. He died on 12 August 1928 in Ostrava, at the sanatorium of Dr. L. Klein, at the age of 74. He was given a large public funeral that included music from the last scene of his Cunning Little Vixen. He was buried in the Circle of Honour at the Brno Central Cemetery.

== Personality ==
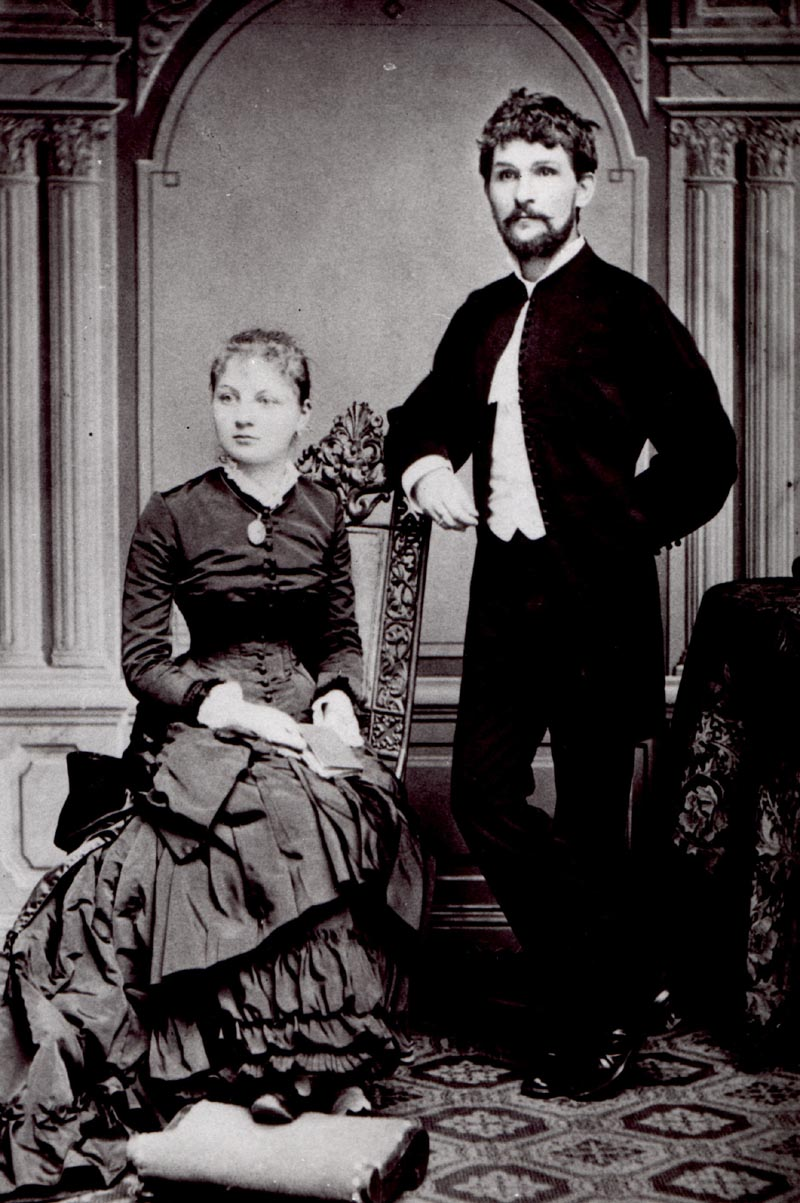
Janáček with his wife Zdenka, in 1881

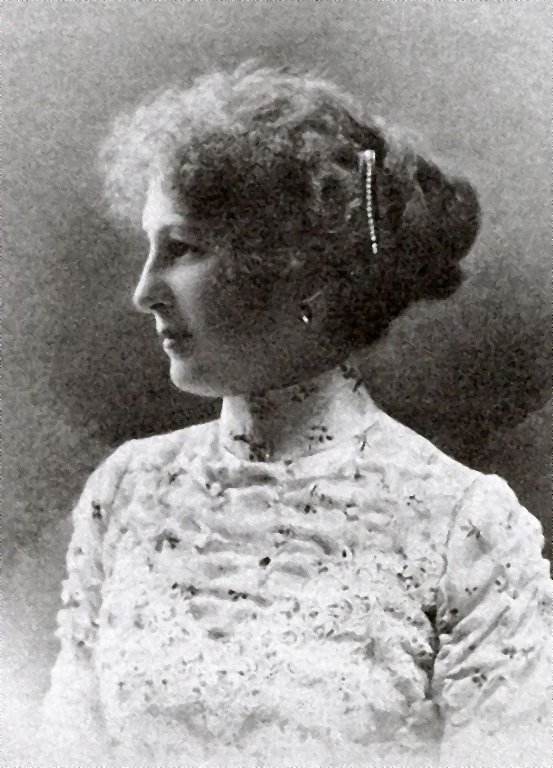
Olga Janáčková

Janáček worked tirelessly throughout his life. He led the organ school, was a professor at the teachers institute and grammar school in Brno, and collected transcriptions of folk songs, conversations and animal vocalisations, all while composing. From an early age, he presented himself as an individualist and his firmly formulated opinions often led to conflict. He unhesitatingly criticized his teachers, who considered him a defiant and anti-authoritarian student, yet his own students found him to be strict and uncompromising. Vilém Tauský, one of his pupils, described his encounters with Janáček as somewhat distressing for someone unused to his personality and noted that Janáček's characteristically staccato speech rhythms were reproduced in some of his operatic characters. In 1881, Janáček gave up his leading role with the Beseda brněnská, as a response to criticism, but a rapid decline in Beseda's performance quality led to his recall in 1882.

His married life, settled and calm in its early years, became increasingly tense and difficult following the death of his daughter, Olga, in 1903. Years of effort in obscurity took their toll, and almost ended his ambitions as a composer: "I was beaten down", he wrote later, "My own students gave me advice – how to compose, how to speak through the orchestra". Success in 1916 – when Karel Kovařovic finally decided to perform Jenůfa in Prague – brought its own problems. Janáček grudgingly resigned himself to the changes forced upon his work. Its success brought him into Prague's music scene and the attentions of soprano Gabriela Horvátová, who guided him through Prague society. Janáček was enchanted by her. On his return to Brno, he appears not to have concealed his new passion from Zdenka, who responded by attempting suicide. That Christmas, after Janáček suspected Zdenka of sending Horvátová an anonymous letter, Zdenka tried to instigate a divorce, but the couple agreed to settle for an "informal" divorce. From then on, until Janáček's death, they lived separate lives in the same household. Eventually Janáček lost interest in Horvátová.

In 1917, he began his lifelong, inspirational and unrequited passion for Kamila Stösslová, who neither sought nor rejected his devotion. Janáček pleaded for first-name terms in their correspondence. In 1927, she finally agreed and signed herself "Tvá Kamila" (Your Kamila) in a letter, which Zdenka found. This revelation provoked a furious quarrel between Zdenka and Janáček, though their living arrangements did not change – Janáček seems to have persuaded her to stay. In 1928, the year of his death, Janáček confessed his intention to publicize his feelings for Stösslová. Max Brod had to dissuade him. Janáček's contemporaries and collaborators described him as mistrustful and reserved, but capable of obsessive passion for those he loved. His overwhelming passion for Stösslová was sincere but verged upon self-destruction. Their letters remain an important source for Janáček's artistic intentions and inspiration. His letters to his long-suffering wife are, by contrast, mundanely descriptive. Other than a few postcards, Zdenka's letters to Janáček have not survived.

== Style ==
In 1874, Janáček became friends with Antonín Dvořák, and began composing in a relatively traditional Romantic style. After his opera Šárka (1887–1888), his style absorbed elements of Moravian and Slovak folk music.

His musical assimilation of the rhythm, pitch contour and inflections of normal Czech speech (specifically Moravian dialects) helped create the very distinctive vocal melodies of his opera Jenůfa (1904), whose 1916 success in Prague was the turning point in his career. In Jenůfa, Janáček developed and applied the concept of "speech melodies" (Czech: nápěvky mluvy) to build a unique musical and dramatic style quite independent of "Wagnerian" dramatic method. He studied the circumstances in which "speech melodies" changed, the psychology and temperament of speakers and the coherence within speech, all of which helped render the dramatically truthful roles of his mature operas, and became one of the most significant markers of his style. Janáček took these stylistic principles much farther in his vocal writing than Modest Mussorgsky, and thus anticipates the later work of Béla Bartók. The stylistic basis for his later works originates in the period of 1904–1918, but Janáček composed most of his output – and his best known works – in the last decade of his life.

Violin Sonata, 2nd movement
Composed in 1914, performed with success in England in the 1920s

Much of Janáček's work displays great originality and individuality. It employs a vastly expanded view of tonality, uses unorthodox chord spacings and structures, and often, modality: "there is no music without key. Atonality abolishes definite key, and thus tonal modulation.... Folksong knows of no atonality." Janáček features accompaniment figures and patterns, with (according to Jim Samson) "the on-going movement of his music...similarly achieved by unorthodox means; often a discourse of short, 'unfinished' phrases comprising constant repetitions of short motifs which gather momentum in a cumulative manner." Janáček named these motifs "sčasovky" (singular sčasovka) in his theoretical works. "Sčasovka" has no strict English equivalent, but John Tyrrell, a leading specialist on Janáček's music, describes it as "a little flash of time, almost a kind of musical capsule, which Janáček often used in slow music as tiny swift motifs with remarkably characteristic rhythms that are supposed to pepper the musical flow." Janáček's use of these repeated motifs demonstrates a remote similarity to minimalist composers (Charles Mackerras called Janáček "the first minimalist composer").

== Inspiration ==
=== Folklore ===
Janáček was deeply influenced by folklore and Eastern European folk music, and by Moravian folk music in particular, but not by the pervasive, idealized 19th century romantic folklore variant. He took a realistic, descriptive and analytic approach to the material. Moravian folk songs, compared with their Bohemian counterparts, are much freer and more irregular in their metrical and rhythmic structure, and more varied in their melodic intervals. In his study of Moravian modes, Janáček found that the peasant musicians did not know the names of the modes and had their own ways of referring to them. He used the term "Moravian modulation" to describe the harmonic progression I–♭VII, which he considered a general characteristic of this region's folk music.

Janáček partly composed the original piano accompaniments to more than 150 folk songs, respectful of their original function and context, and partly used folk inspiration in his own works, especially in his mature compositions. His work in this area was not stylistically imitative; instead, he developed a new and original musical aesthetic based on a deep study of the fundamentals of folk music.

=== Russia ===
Janáček's deep and lifelong affection for Russia and Russian culture represents another important element of his musical inspiration. In 1888 he attended the Prague performance of Tchaikovsky's music, and met the older composer. Janáček profoundly admired Tchaikovsky, and particularly appreciated his highly developed musical thought in connection with the use of Russian folk motifs. Janáček's Russian inspiration is especially apparent in his later chamber, symphonic and operatic output. He closely followed developments in Russian music from his early years, and in 1896, following his first visit to Russia, he founded a Russian Circle in Brno. Janáček read Russian authors in their original language. Their literature offered him an enormous and reliable source of inspiration, though this did not blind him to the problems of Russian society. He was twenty-two years old when he wrote his first composition based on a Russian theme: a melodrama, Death, set to Lermontov's poem. In his later works, he often used literary models with sharply contoured plots. In 1910 Zhukovsky's Tale of Tsar Berendei inspired him to write the Fairy Tale for Cello and Piano. He composed the rhapsody Taras Bulba (1918) to Gogol's short story, and five years later, in 1923, completed his first string quartet, inspired by Tolstoy's Kreutzer Sonata. Two of his later operas were based on Russian themes: Káťa Kabanová, composed in 1921 to Alexander Ostrovsky's play The Storm, and his last work, From the House of the Dead, which transformed Dostoevsky's vision of the world into an exciting collective drama.

=== Other composers ===
One of Janáček's early influences was Antonín Dvořák, whom he always deeply admired and to whom he dedicated some of his works. He rearranged part of Dvořák's Moravian Duets for mixed choir with original piano accompaniment. In the early years of the 20th century, Janáček became increasingly interested in the music of other European composers. His opera Destiny was a response to another significant and famous work in contemporary Bohemia – Louise, by the French composer Gustave Charpentier. The influence of Giacomo Puccini is apparent particularly in Janáček's later works, for example in his opera Káťa Kabanová. Although he carefully observed developments in European music, his operas remained firmly connected with Czech and Slavic themes.

== Publications ==
Janáček published music theory works, essays and articles over a period of fifty years, from 1877 to 1927. He wrote and edited the Hudební listy journal, and contributed to many specialist music journals, such as Cecílie, Hlídka and Dalibor. He also completed several extensive studies, as Úplná nauka o harmonii (The Complete Harmony Theory), O skladbě souzvukův a jejich spojův (On the Construction of Chords and Their Connections) and Základy hudebního sčasování (Basics of Musical Sčasování). In his essays and books, Janáček examined various musical topics, forms, melody and harmony theories, dyad and triad chords, counterpoint (or "opora", meaning "support") and devoted himself to the study of the mental composition. His theoretical works stress the Czech term "sčasování", Janáček's specific word for rhythm, which has relation to time (čas in Czech), and the handling of time in music composition. He distinguished several types of rhythm (sčasovka): "znící" (sounding) – meaning any rhythm, "čítací" (counting) – meaning smaller units measuring the course of rhythm; and "scelovací" (summing) – a long value comprising the length of a rhythmical unit. Janáček used the combination of their mutual action widely in his own works.

As well as his contributions to music journals, Janáček also wrote essays, reports, reviews, feuilletons, articles and books, regularly contributing such content to local newspapers in Brno. His work in this area comprises around 380 individual items. Janáček's literary legacy represents an important illustration of his life, public work and art.

=== Selected writings ===
A selection of Janáček's many publications is given below.

- O dokonalé představě dvojzvuku (On the Perfect Image of the Dyad Chord) (1885–1886)
- Bedřich Smetana o formách hudebních (Bedřich Smetana: On Musical Forms) (1886)
- O představě tóniny (On the Idea of Key) (1886–1887)
- O vědeckosti nauk o harmonii (On the Scientificity of Harmony Theories) (1887)
- O trojzvuku (On the Triad) (1887–1888)
- Slovíčko o kontrapunktu (A Word on Counterpoint) (1888)
- Nový proud v teorii hudební (A New Trend in Music Theory) (1894)
- O skladbě souzvukův a jejich spojův (On the Construction of Chords and Their Progressions) (1896)
- Moderní harmonická hudba (Modern Harmonic Music) (1907)
- Můj názor o sčasování (rytmu) (My Opinion of "sčasování" (Rhythm)) (1907)
- Z praktické části o sčasování (rytmu) (On "sčasování" From practice) (1908)
- Váha reálních motivů (The Weight of Real Motifs) (1910)
- O průběhu duševní práce skladatelské (On the Course of Mental Compositional Work) (1916)
- Úplná nauka o harmonii (A Complete Theory of Harmony) (1920)

== Folk music research ==
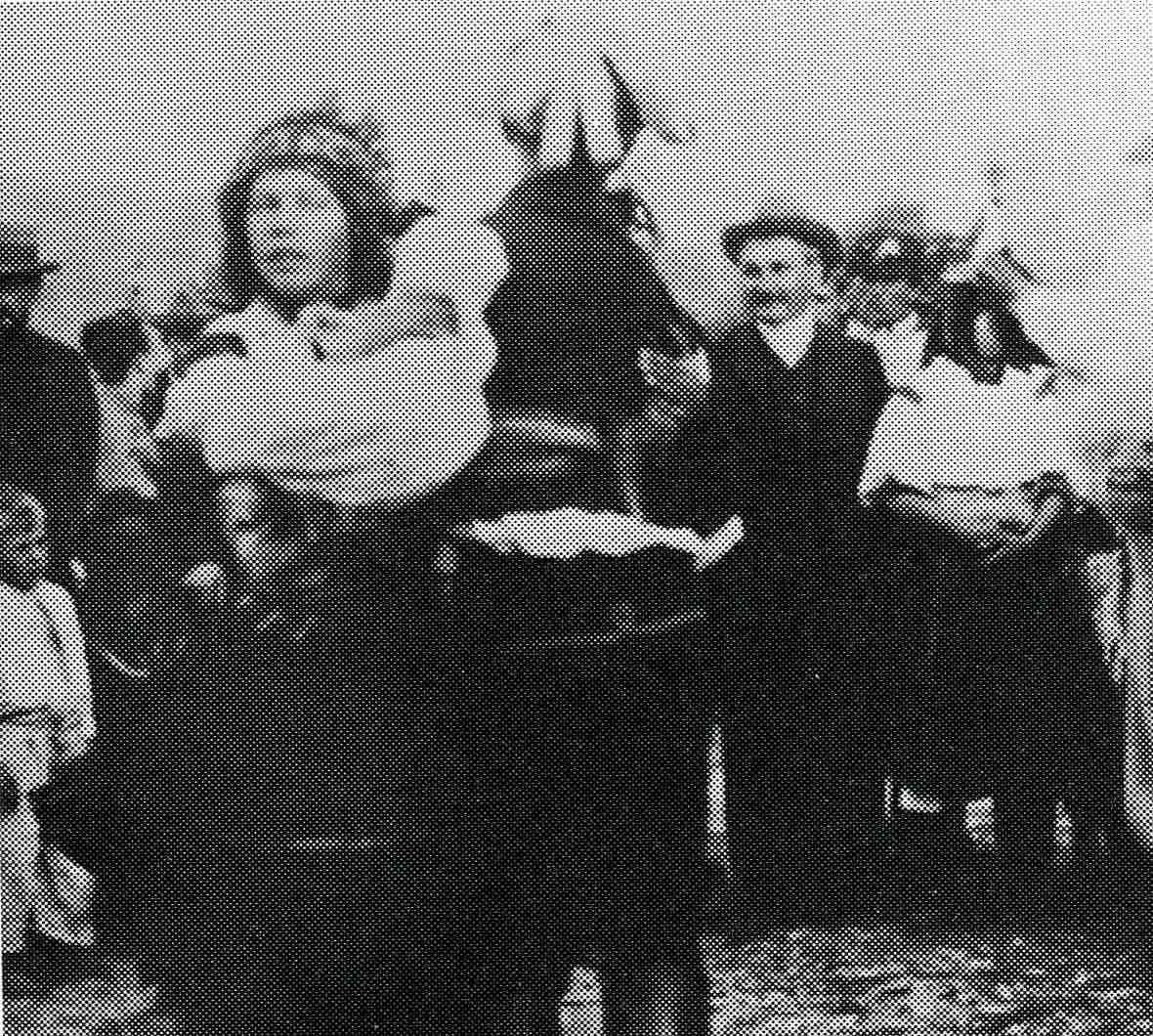
Janáček collecting folksongs on 19 August 1906 in Strání

Janáček came from a region characterized by its deeply rooted folk culture, which he explored as a young student under Pavel Křížkovský. His meeting with the folklorist and dialectologist František Bartoš (1837–1906) was decisive in his own development as a folklorist and composer, and led to their collaborative and systematic collections of folk songs. Janáček became an important collector in his own right, especially of Lach, Moravian Slovak, Moravian Wallachian and Slovak songs. From 1879, his collections included transcribed speech intonations. He was one of the organizers of the Czech-Slavic Folklore Exhibition, an important event in Czech culture at the end of 19th century. From 1905 he was President of the newly instituted Working Committee for Czech National Folksong in Moravia and Silesia, a branch of the Austrian institute Das Volkslied in Österreich (Folksong in Austria), which was established in 1902 by the Viennese publishing house Universal Edition. Janáček was a pioneer and propagator of ethnographic photography in Moravia and Silesia. In October 1909 he acquired an Edison phonograph and became one of the first to use phonographic recording as a folklore research tool. Several of these recording sessions have been preserved, and were reissued in 1998.

== Criticism ==
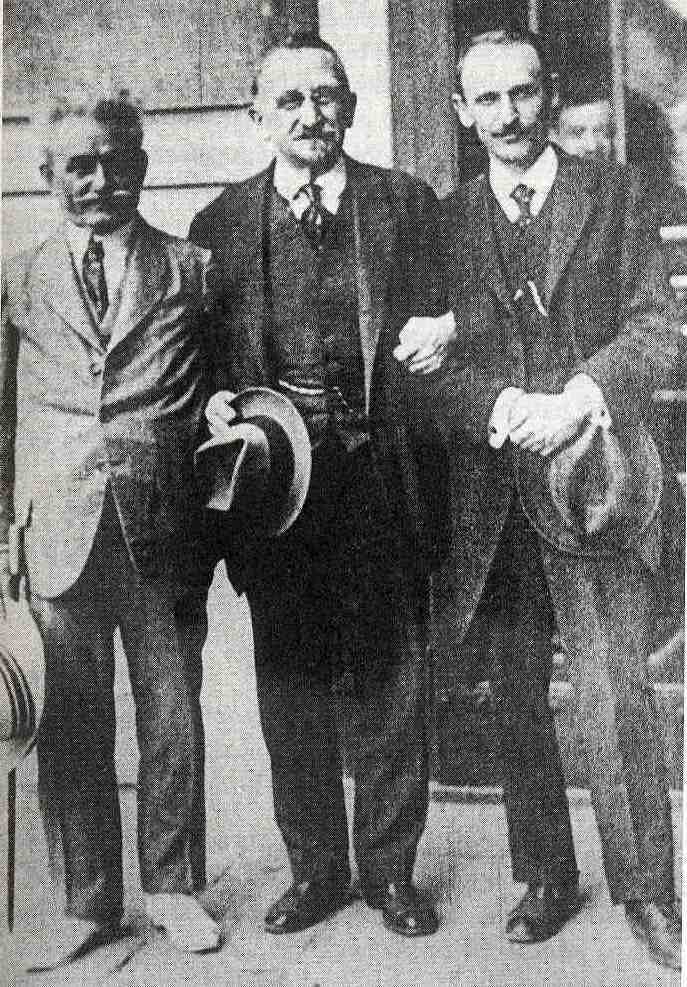
Janáček with Karel Kovařovic and Jan Kunc in Summer 1917

Czech musicology at the beginning of the 20th century was strongly influenced by Romanticism, in particular by the styles of Wagner and Smetana. Performance practices were conservative, and actively resistant to stylistic innovation. During his lifetime, Janáček reluctantly conceded to Karel Kovařovic's instrumental rearrangement of Jenůfa, most noticeably in the finale, in which Kovařovic added a more "festive" sound of trumpets and French horns, and doubled some instruments to support Janáček's "poor" instrumentation. The score of Jenůfa was later restored by Charles Mackerras, and is now performed according to Janáček's original intentions.

Another important Czech musicologist, Zdeněk Nejedlý, a great admirer of Smetana and later a communist Minister of Culture, condemned Janáček as an author who could accumulate a lot of material, but was unable to do anything with it. He called Janáček's style "unanimated", and his operatic duets "only speech melodies", without polyphonic strength. Nejedlý considered Janáček rather an amateurish composer, whose music did not conform to the style of Smetana. According to Charles Mackerras, he tried to destroy Janáček professionally. In 2006 Josef Bartoš, the Czech aesthetician and music critic, described Janáček as a "musical eccentric" who clung tenaciously to an imperfect, improvising style, but Bartoš appreciated some elements of Janáček's works and judged him more positively than Nejedlý.

Janáček's friend and collaborator Václav Talich, former chief-conductor of the Czech Philharmonic, sometimes adjusted Janáček's scores, mainly for their instrumentation and dynamics; some critics sharply attacked him for doing so. Talich re-orchestrated Taras Bulba and the Suite from Cunning Little Vixen justifying the latter with the claim that "it was not possible to perform it in the Prague National Theatre unless it was entirely re-orchestrated". Talich's rearrangement rather emasculated the specific sounds and contrasts of Janáček's original, but was the standard version for many years. Charles Mackerras started to research Janáček's music in the 1960s, and gradually restored the composer's distinctive scoring. The critical edition of Janáček's scores is published by the Czech Editio Janáček.

== Legacy ==
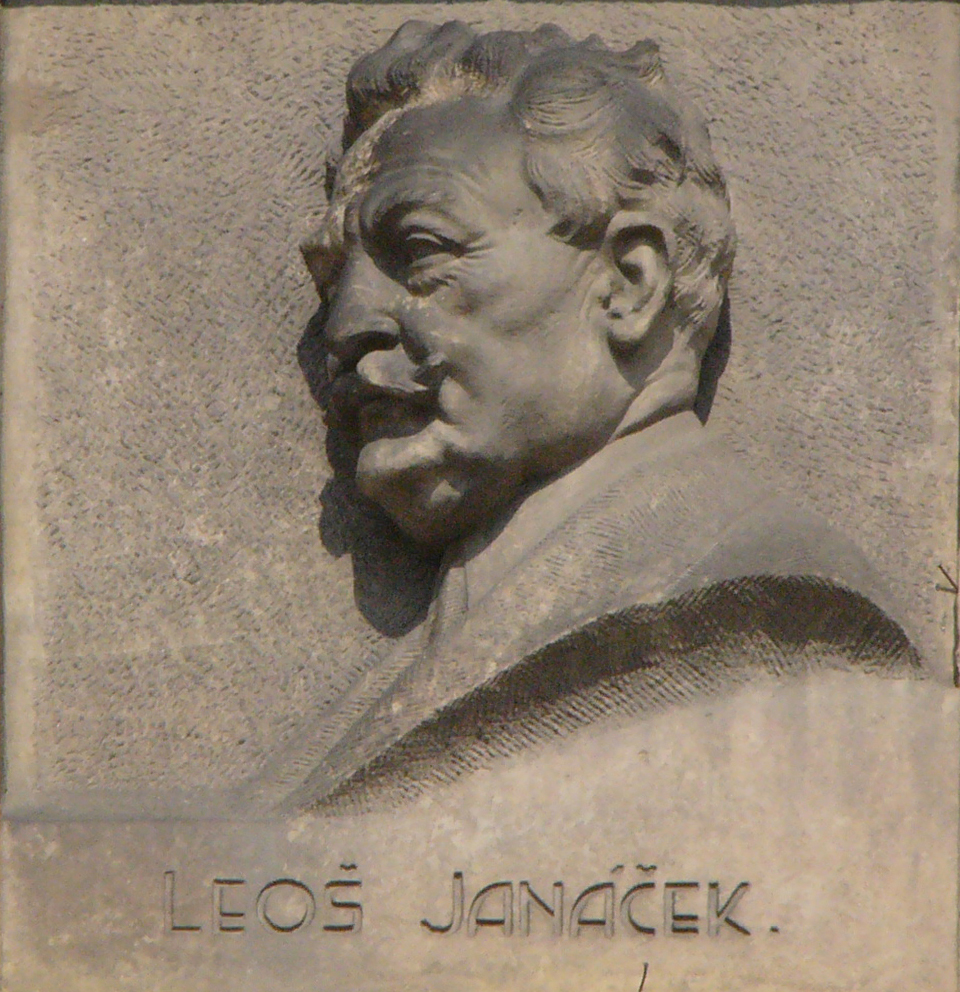
Janáček relief, by Julius Pelikán, at Olomouc

Janáček belongs to a wave of twentieth-century composers who sought greater realism and greater connection with everyday life, combined with a more all-encompassing use of musical resources. His operas, in particular, demonstrate the use of "speech"-derived melodic lines, folk and traditional material, and complex modal musical argument. He would also inspire music theorists (among them Jaroslav Volek) to place modal development at the same level of importance as harmony in music. Along with Dvořák and Smetana, he is generally considered one of the most important Czech composers.

The operas of his mature period, Jenůfa (1904), Káťa Kabanová (1921), The Cunning Little Vixen (1924), The Makropulos Affair (1926) and From the House of the Dead (after a novel by Dostoevsky and premièred posthumously in 1930) are considered his finest works. The Australian conductor Sir Charles Mackerras became very closely associated with Janáček's operas.

Janáček's chamber music, while not especially voluminous, includes works which are widely considered twentieth-century classics, particularly his two string quartets: Quartet No. 1, "The Kreutzer Sonata" inspired by the Tolstoy novella, and the Quartet No. 2, "Intimate Letters". Milan Kundera called these compositions the peak of Janáček's output.

Janáček established a school of composition in Brno. Among his notable pupils were Jan Kunc, Václav Kaprál, Vilém Petrželka, Jaroslav Kvapil, Osvald Chlubna, Břetislav Bakala and Pavel Haas. Most of his students neither imitated nor developed Janáček's style, which left him no direct stylistic descendants. According to Milan Kundera, Janáček developed a personal, modern style in relative isolation from contemporary modernist movements but was in close contact with developments in modern European music. His path towards the innovative "modernism" of his later years was long and solitary, and he achieved true individuation as a composer around his 50th year.

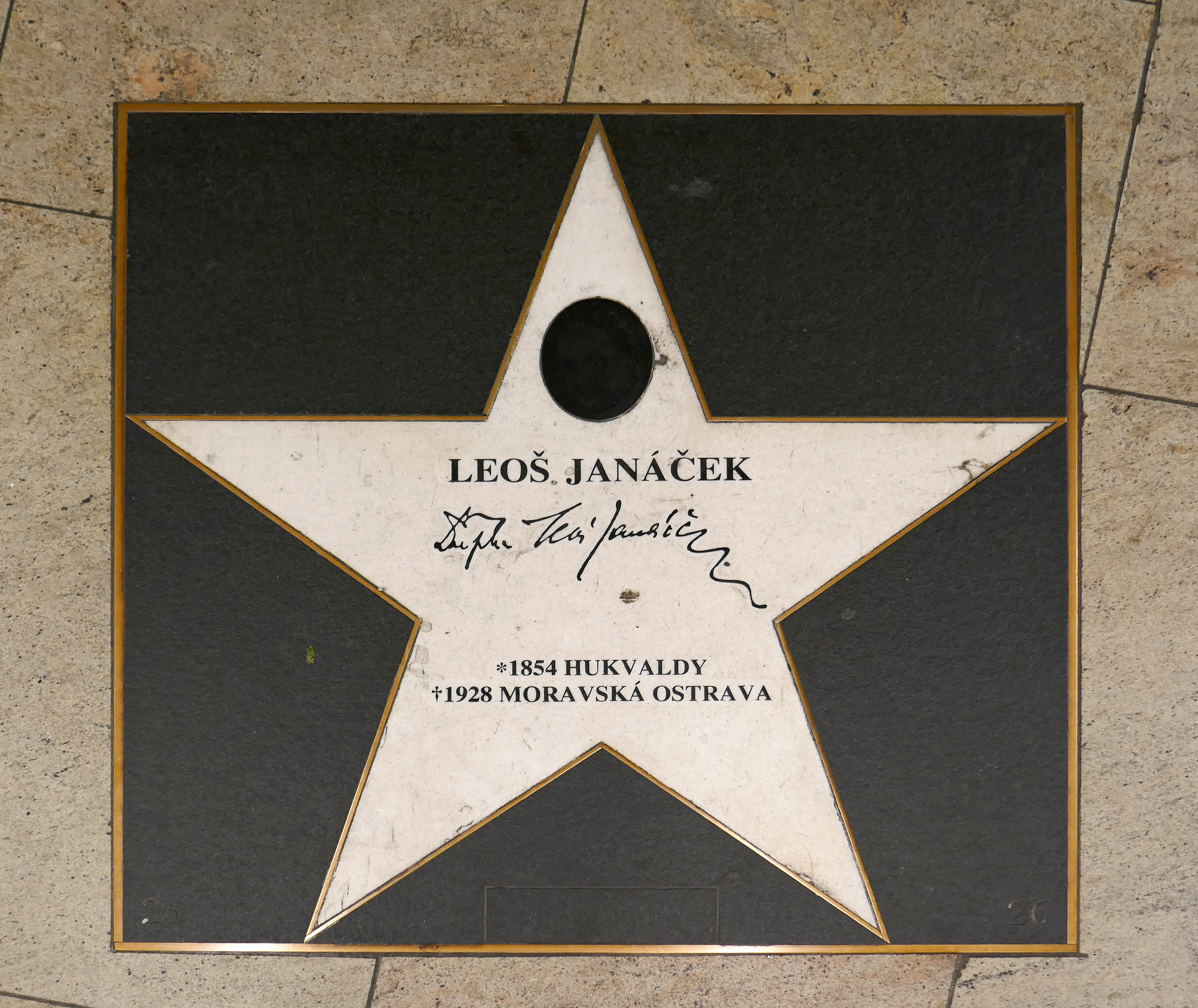
Star on the Musik Meile Vienna

Sir Charles Mackerras, the Australian conductor who helped promote Janáček's works on the world's opera stages, described his style as "... completely new and original, different from anything else ... and impossible to pin down to any one style". According to Mackerras, Janáček's use of whole-tone scale differs from that of Debussy, his folk music inspiration is absolutely dissimilar from Dvořák's and Smetana's, and his characteristically complex rhythms differ from the techniques of the young Stravinsky.

The French conductor and composer Pierre Boulez, who interpreted Janáček's operas and orchestral works, called his music surprisingly modern and fresh: "Its repetitive pulse varies through changes in rhythm, tone and direction." He described his opera From the House of the Dead as "primitive, in the best sense, but also extremely strong, like the paintings of Léger, where the rudimentary character allows a very vigorous kind of expression".

The Czech conductor, composer and writer Jaroslav Vogel wrote what was for a long time considered the standard biography of Janáček in 1958. It first appeared in German translation, and in the Czech original in 1963. The first English translation came out in 1962 and it was later re-issued, in a version revised by Karel Janovický, in 1981. Charles Mackerras regarded it as his "Janáček bible".

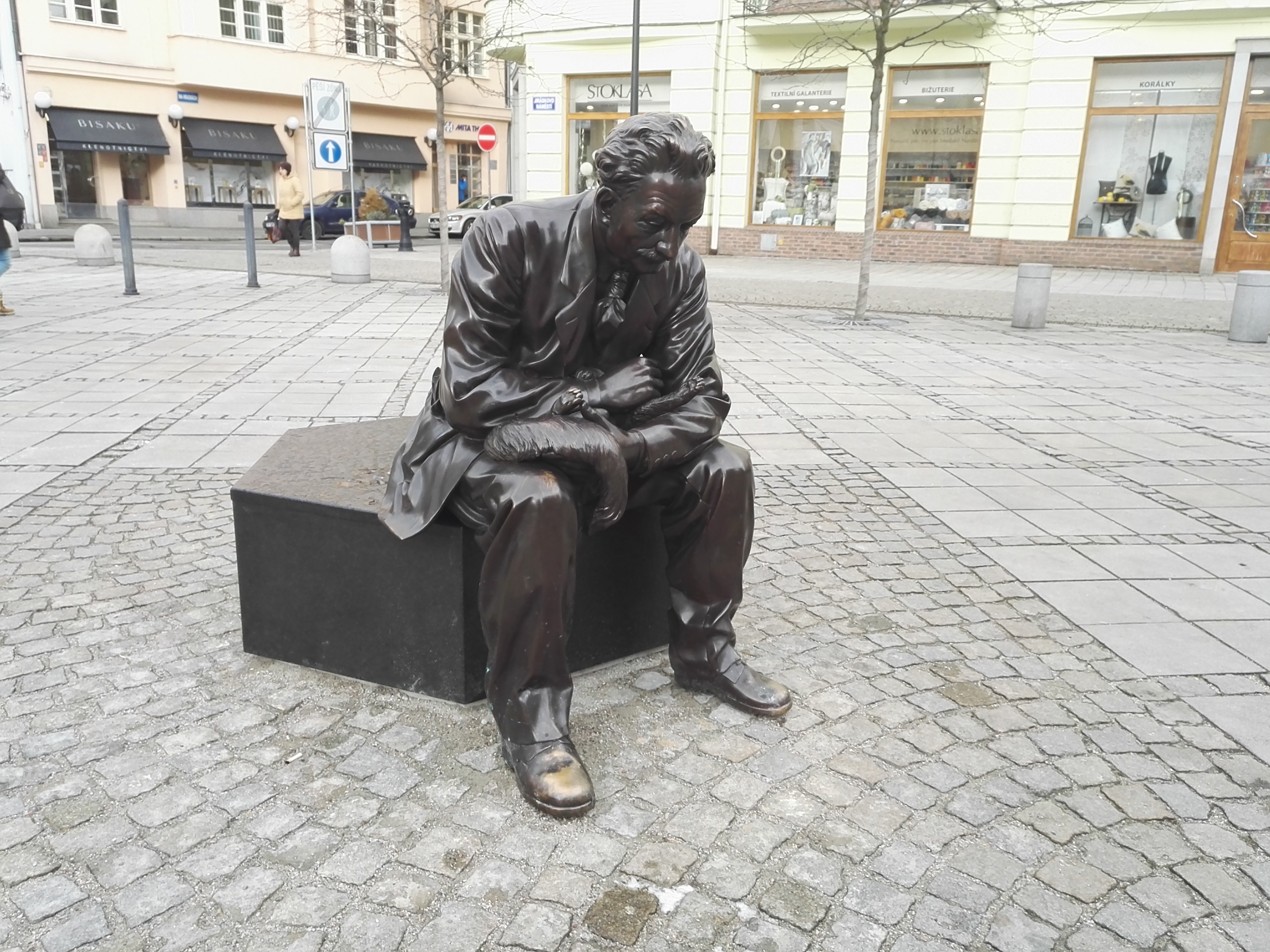
Janáček statue in Moravská Ostrava

A bronze statue of Leoš Janáček sitting on a stone bench was unveiled in 2017 on Jirásek Square, Ostrava. The statue, by David Moješčík, depicts Janáček in life-size with The Cunning Little Vixen in his arms. The work contains several symbols that are primarily associated with the theme of death.

Janáček's life has been featured in several films. In 1974 Eva Marie Kaňková made a short documentary Fotograf a muzika (The Photographer and the Music) about the Czech photographer Josef Sudek and his relationship to Janáček's work. In 1983 the Brothers Quay produced a stop motion animated film, Leoš Janáček: Intimate Excursions, about Janáček's life and work, and in 1986 the Czech director Jaromil Jireš made Lev s bílou hřívou (Lion with the White Mane), which showed the amorous inspiration behind Janáček's works. The score of the 1988 film The Unbearable Lightness of Being consists largely of pieces by Janáček. In Search of Janáček is a Czech documentary directed in 2004 by Petr Kaňka, made to celebrate the 150th anniversary of Janáček's birth. An animated cartoon version of The Cunning Little Vixen was made in 2003 by the BBC, with music performed by the Deutsches Symphonie-Orchester Berlin and conducted by Kent Nagano. A re-arrangement of the opening of the Sinfonietta was used by the progressive rock band Emerson, Lake & Palmer for the song "Knife-Edge" on their 1970 debut album.

The Janáček Philharmonic Orchestra was established in 1954. Today the 116-piece ensemble is associated with mostly contemporary music but also regularly performs works from the classical repertoire. The orchestra is resident at the House of Culture Vítkovice (Dům kultury Vítkovice) in Ostrava, Czech Republic. The orchestra tours extensively and has performed in Europe, the U.S., Australia, Japan, South Korea and Taiwan.

Asteroid 2073 Janáček, discovered in 1974 by Luboš Kohoutek, is named in his honor. The Haruki Murakami novel 1Q84 (2009/2010) uses Janáček's Sinfonietta as a recurring plot point. Ostrava's international airport was renamed after Janáček in November 2006.
