= Na Starém bělidle =

1901 opera by Karel Kovařovic

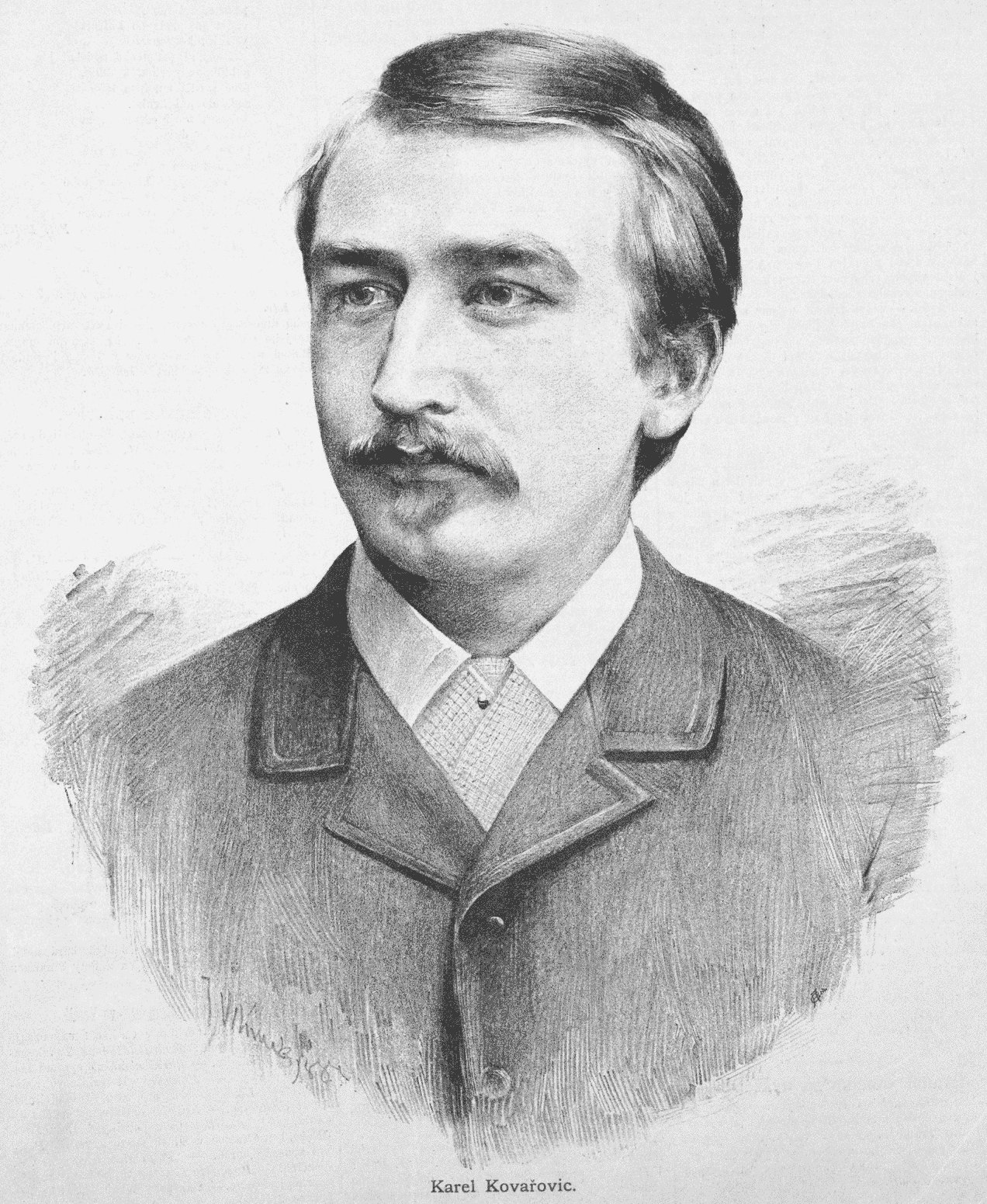
Karel Kovařovic

Na Starém bělidle (At the old bleachery) is a 1901 Czech-language opera in 4 scenes by Karel Kovařovic to a libretto by Karel Šípek after the 1855 novel The Grandmother by Božena Němcová. The opera was premiered 22 November 1901 at Prague National Theatre.

== Recordings ==
- Marta Krásová, Borek Rujan, Vera Krilová, Karel Kalas, Prague Radio Symphony Orchestra, František Dyk 1948
