= Újezd (Domažlice District) =

- Municipality
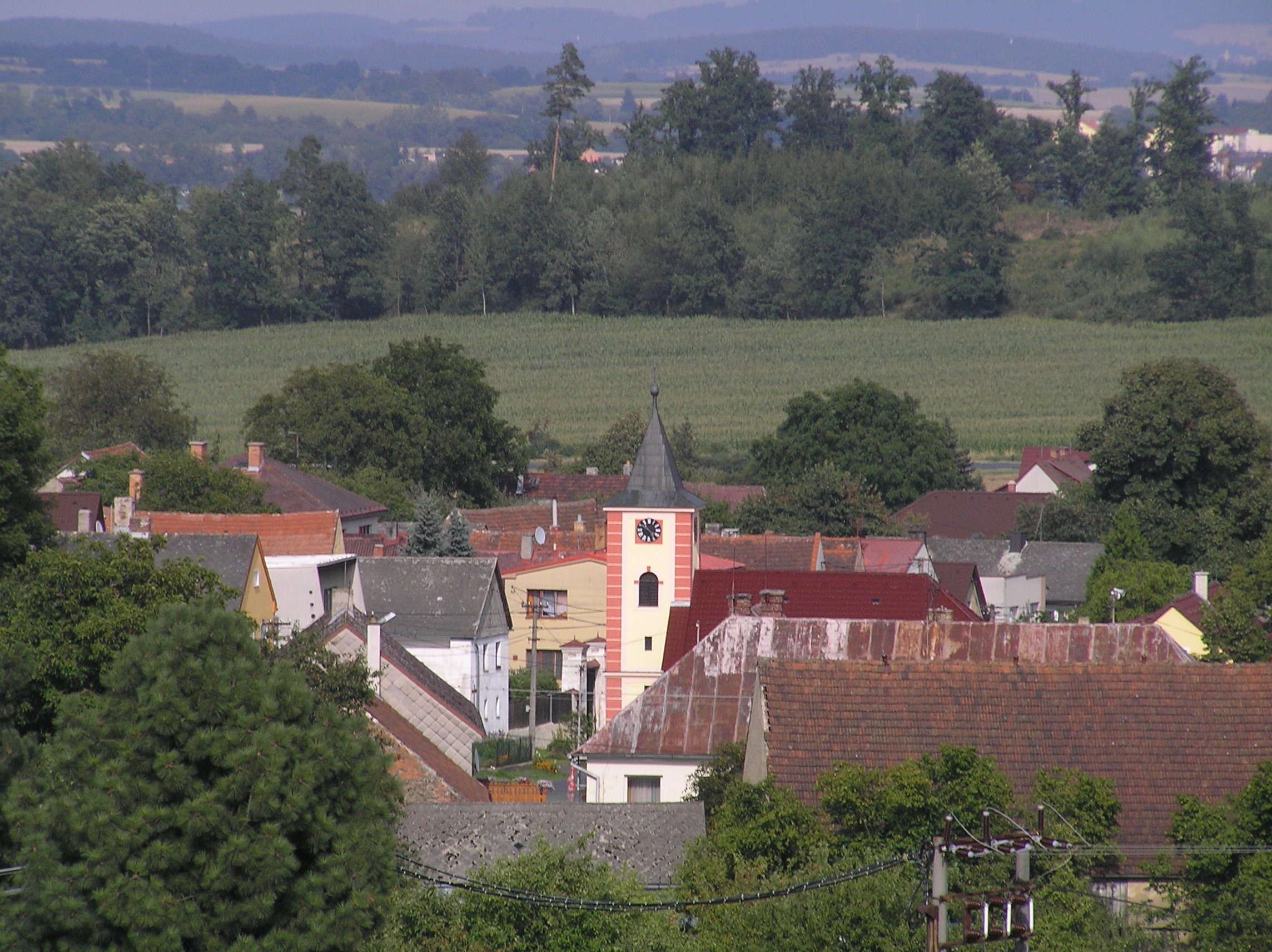
- General view

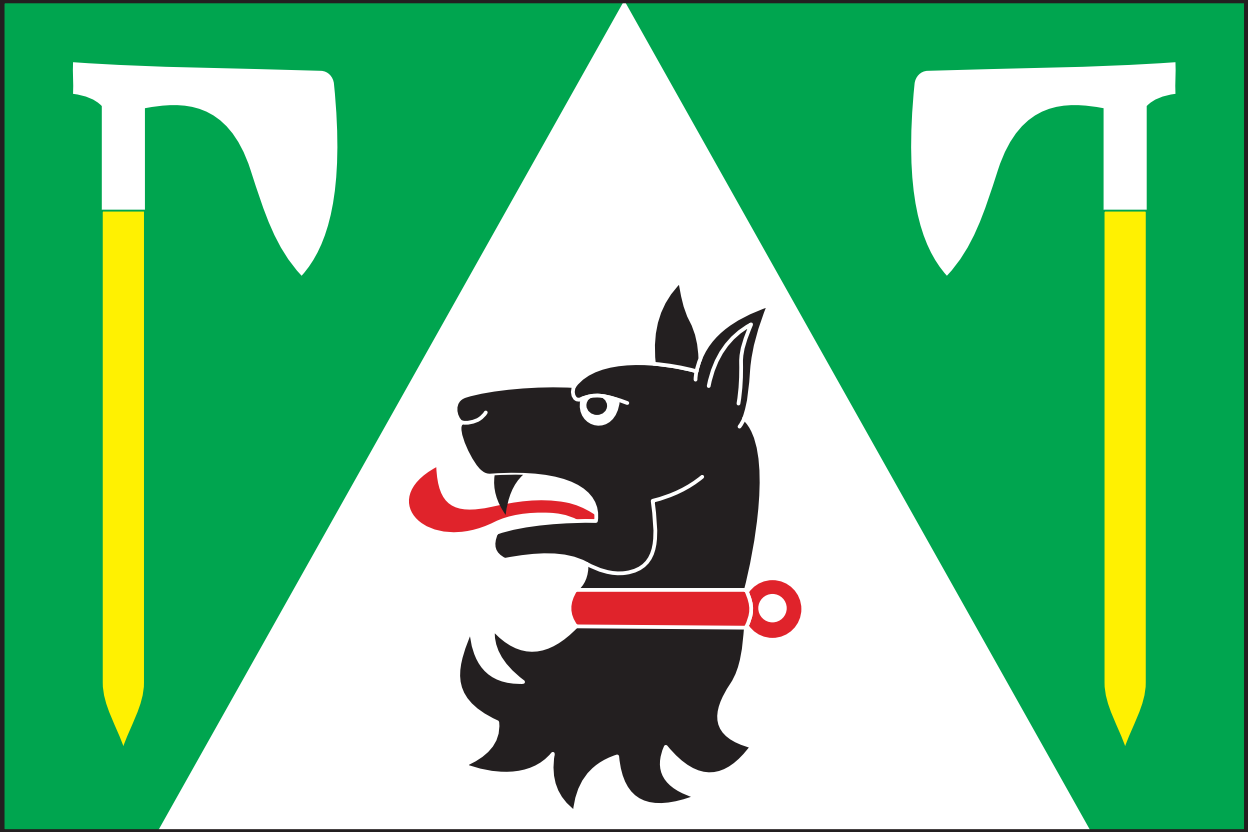
- Flag Coat of arms

- Location in the Czech Republic
- Coordinates: 49°26′8″N 12°52′11″E
- Country: Czech Republic
- Region: Plzeň
- District: Domažlice
- First mentioned: 1325

Area
  - Total: 11.02 km^{2} (4.25 sq mi)
- Elevation: 503 m (1,650 ft)

Population (2026-01-01)
  - Total: 449
  - Density: 40.7/km^{2} (106/sq mi)
- Time zone: UTC+1 (CET)
  - Summer (DST): UTC+2 (CEST)
- Postal code: 344 01
- Website: www.obecujezd.cz

Újezd is a municipality and village in Domažlice District in the Plzeň Region of the Czech Republic. It has about 400 inhabitants.

Újezd lies approximately 4 kilometres (2 mi) west of Domažlice, 51 km (32 mi) south-west of Plzeň, and 133 km (83 mi) south-west of Prague.

== Administrative division ==
Újezd consists of two municipal parts (in brackets population according to the 2021 census):

- Újezd (344)
- Petrovice (75)

== Demographics ==
Historical population
Year	Pop.	±%
1869	648	—
1880	775	+19.6%
1890	808	+4.3%
1900	719	−11.0%
1910	747	+3.9%
1921	825	+10.4%
1930	681	−17.5%
1950	541	−20.6%
1961	509	−5.9%
1970	391	−23.2%
1980	378	−3.3%
1991	344	−9.0%
2001	343	−0.3%
2011	397	+15.7%
2021	419	+5.5%
Source: Censuses

== Notable people ==
- Jan Sladký Kozina (1652–1695), revolutionary leader of the peasant rebellion
