= Pohádka =

Composition by Leoš Janáček

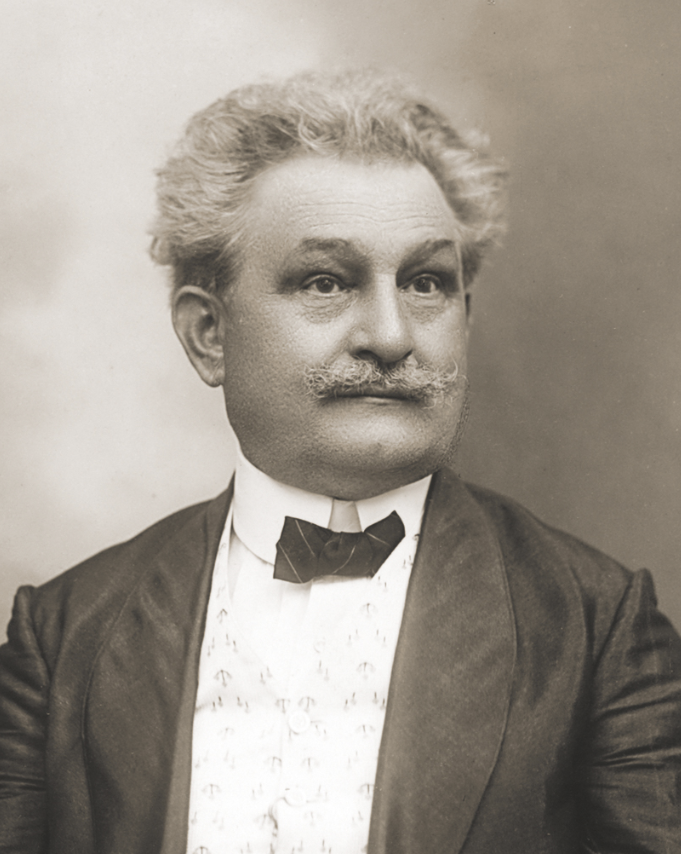
Leoš Janáček in 1914

Pohádka (traditionally translated as Fairy Tale, or more literally from the Czech: A Tale) is a chamber composition for cello and piano by Czech composer Leoš Janáček.

Pohádka is based on an epic poem by the Russian author Vasily Zhukovsky entitled The Tale of Tsar Berendyey (Russian: Сказка о царе Берендее), which unsurprisingly piqued Janáček's interest in Russian culture. The composition presents scenes from the story rather than being a complete description of the tale.

It was composed at a difficult time for Janáček, following the death of his daughter Olga and when he was still seeking musical recognition. Much of the music is in keys or modes with six flats, which gives the music a somewhat veiled quality similar to Janáček's piano work In the Mists. Several different versions of the piece existed during his lifetime, although only the last is usually performed today. It is his only published composition for this combination of instruments.

== Versions ==
First version

The first version of Pohádka was in three movements, marked Introduction-Andante, Con moto, and Con moto. The autograph manuscript is dated 1910 and was not published. The composition was premièred in Brno on 13 March in Janáček's presence, although it seems that at the time he was intending it to be part of a larger work.

Second version

The second version was in four movements and was first performed in September 1912. Janáček revised the work with the addition of a tranquil finale which also reprised part of the introduction, intended to depict the Tsarina singing a lullaby.

Third version

Janáček's final version returned the piece to a three-movement form which differed little from the original. The Introduction and first movement of the 1912 version are joined with no separate titles and the last movement is omitted. In addition, Janáček altered many of the rhythms, removed a repeat from the third movement and made other revisions. It was first heard in Brno on 3 March 1923 and subsequently performed in Prague, Olomouc and in London during Janáček's visit there in 1926. This version was published by Hudební Matice Umělecké Besedy in 1924.

== Presto ==
A composition of 172 bars, marked simply Presto, also exists in Janáček's hand on the same paper as the manuscript of Pohádka. No instruments are specified but it is almost certain, given the range and clef of the solo part, that it is for violoncello and piano. The scholar Jaroslav Vogel and others have thus speculated that this movement was intended to be included in the original version of Pohádka, but was removed when the work was revised.

== In popular culture ==
A portion of Pohádka was used in the soundtrack to the 1988 film The Unbearable Lightness of Being and also in The Discovery of Heaven from 2001 (based on the book of the same name by Harry Mulisch).
