= Zdenka Janáčková =

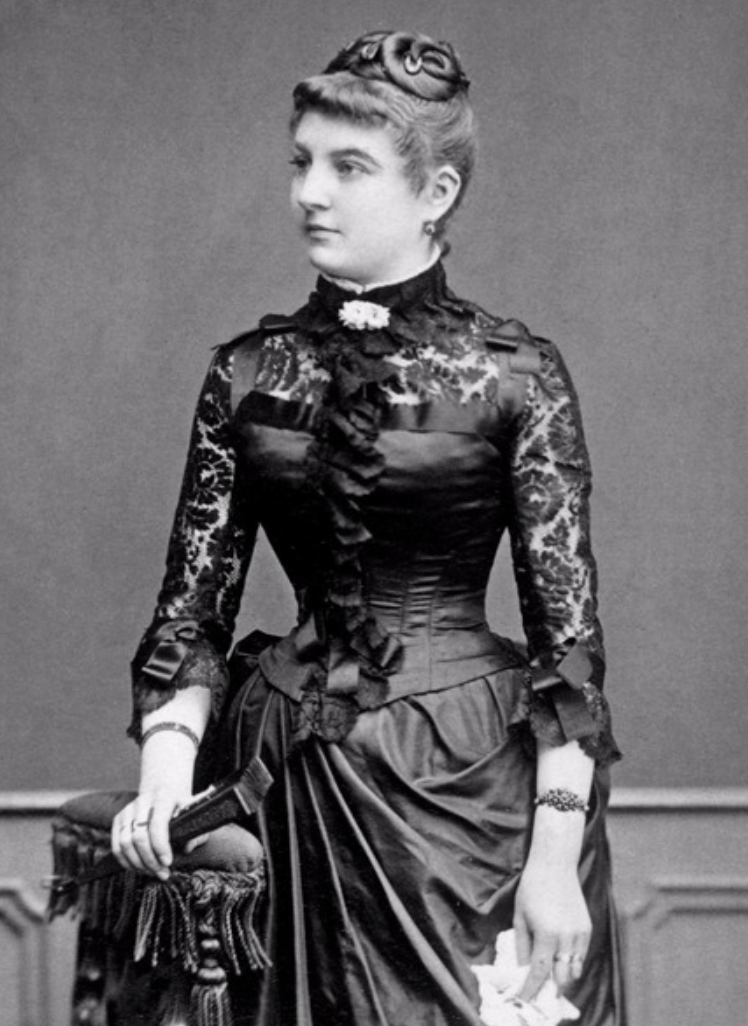
Janáčková in 1885

Zdenka Janáčková (née Schulzová; 30 July 1865 – 25 February 1938) was a Czech writer and the wife of the composer Leoš Janáček.

== Life ==
Zdenka Schulzová was born in Olomouc, Moravia, on 30 July 1865 to the Czech-German family of the director of the Brno Teachers' Institute, Emilián Schulz, and his wife, Anna Kalušková.

Her parents wanted her to develop her talents, and encouraged her to play the piano. Leoš Janáček became her teacher, and proposed to her at the age of fourteen.

From his travels, Janáček wrote his fiancée 4 to 8 letters a day. After returning from Vienna, he became engaged to Zdenka and married her in 1881 in Old Brno when she was 15.

The marriage produced two children, but the younger, the son Vladimír (1888–1890), died at the age of two after he became infected with scarlet fever passed on from his sister, and the latter, Olga (1882–1903) died prematurely at the age of twenty-one when she contracted typhus during her stay in Saint Petersburg. The marriage was put to a difficult test when Janáček began a platonic relationship with Kamila Stösslová. However, Zdenka remained married to her husband until his death in 1928.

She died on 25 February 1938 in Brno. She is buried in the Schulz family tomb at the Brno Central Cemetery.

== Legacy ==
The 1986 film The Lion with the White Mane was made about the Janáček marriage, starring Luděk Munzar and his wife Jana Hlaváčová.

Her memoirs were published in 1998.
