= Psohlavci (opera) =

Psohlavci is a Czech-language opera in 3 acts by Karel Kovařovic to a libretto by Karel Šípek after Psohlavci (The Dogheads) by Alois Jirásek. It premiered on 24 April 1898 at the Prague National Theatre.

== Roles ==
- Hančí
- Jan Sladký Kozina
- Kryštof Hrubý
- Matěj Přibek
- Stará Kozinová

== Recordings ==
- Drahomíra Tikalová, Beno Blachut, Václav Bednář, Marie Veselá, Vladimír Jedenáctík, Oldřich Kovář, Zdeněk Otava, Miluše Dvořáková; Prague National Theatre Orchestra, Prague National Theatre Chorus, František Dyk 1961
