= The Wandering Madman =

Composition by Leoš Janáček

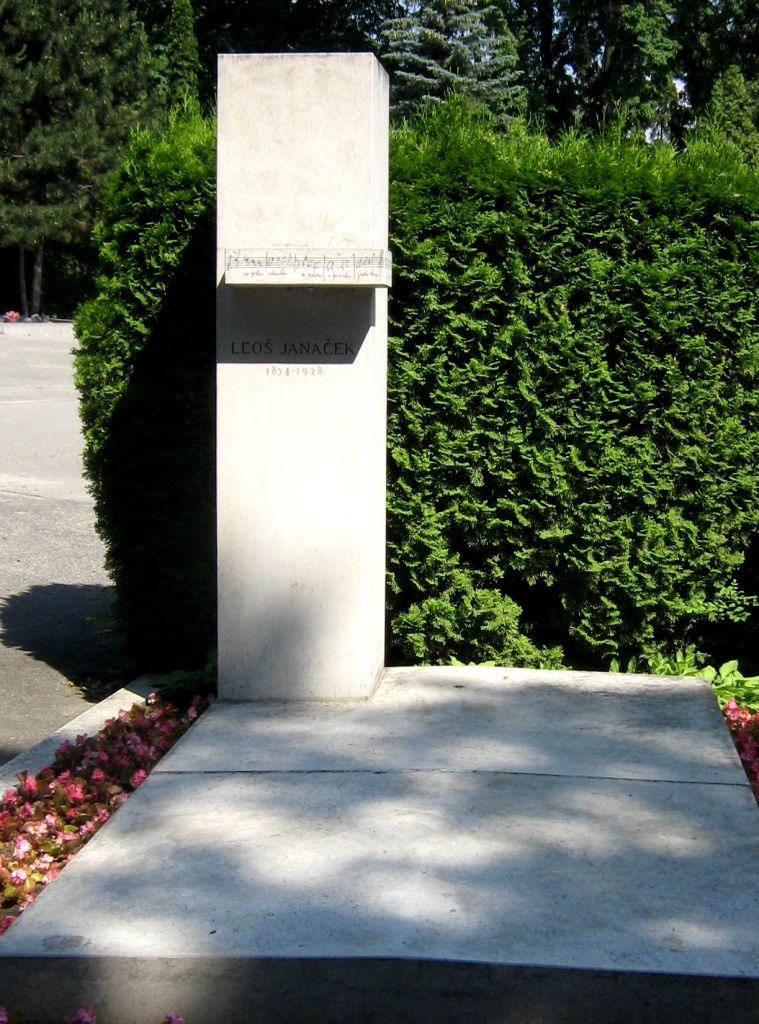
Janáček's grave at the Brno Central Cemetery in Brno. The gravestone bears a copy of several bars of the autograph manuscript and the inscription "... with his strength gone, and his heart in the dust, like a tree ..."[sic], borrowed from the chorus.

The Wandering Madman (Czech: Potulný šílenec) is a choral composition for soprano, tenor, baritone and male chorus, written in 1922 by the Czech composer Leoš Janáček to the words of a poem by Rabindranath Tagore. It was inspired by Tagore's 1921 lecture in Czechoslovakia. The Wandering Madman is considered one of the most important of Janáček's choral works.

== Background and structure ==
In June 1921, Janáček attended a lecture in Prague given by Tagore. He later mentioned the lecture in an article for the Lidové noviny newspaper. He took down the writer's "speech melodies" and apparently found an inspiration in his poems. The next year, from July to November, he composed a choral work based on a poem by Tagore. The poem was translated to the Czech language under the title Potulný šílenec (transl. F. Balej).

The Wandering Madman premiered in Rosice u Brna on 21 September 1924 in a performance by Pěvecké sdružení moravských učitelů (PSMU) (The Choral Society of Moravian Teachers) with soprano solo Eliška Janečková and conductor Ferdinand Vach. The same year, the composition was performed with the composer in attendance in Prague's Mozarteum, as a part of a concert organized by the Prague Conservatory.

The composition is scored for soprano, tenor, baritone and TTBB choir. The duration of the work is approximately five minutes. The autograph is dated 12 November 1922.

The Janáček specialist Alena Němcová wrote about the composition: "Janáček in this work examines the human fate and looks back on the extremely difficult finding his own way, in which each step was a step of fierce searching. In the fate of the wandering madman, who again looks for a "touchstone", we see a true picture of Janáček's life..."

The gravestone of the Janáček's grave at the Brno Central Cemetery in Brno bears a copy of several bars of the autograph manuscript and the inscription "... with his strength gone, and his heart in the dust, like a tree ...", borrowed from the work.

== Words ==
For his composition, Janáček used a story from Tagore's book The Gardener (1913):

A wandering madman was seeking the touchstone, with matted locks

tawny and dust-laden, and body worn to a shadow, his lips
tight-pressed, like the shut-up doors of his heart, his burning
eyes like the lamp of a glow-worm seeking its mate.

Before him the endless ocean roared.
The garrulous waves ceaselessly talked of hidden treasures,
mocking the ignorance that knew not their meaning.
Maybe he now had no hope remaining, yet he would not rest, for
the search had become his life,—
Just as the ocean for ever lifts its arms to the sky for the
unattainable—
Just as the stars go in circles, yet seeking a goal that can
never be reached—
Even so on the lonely shore the madman with dusty tawny locks
still roamed in search of the touchstone.

One day a village boy came up and asked, "Tell me, where did you
come at this golden chain about your waist?"
The madman started—the chain that once was iron was verily gold;
it was not a dream, but he did not know when it had changed.
He struck his forehead wildly—where, O where had he without
knowing it achieved success?
It had grown into a habit, to pick up pebbles and touch the
chain, and to throw them away without looking to see if a
change had come; thus the madman found and lost the touchstone.
The sun was sinking low in the west, the sky was of gold.
The madman returned on his footsteps to seek anew the lost
treasure, with his strength gone, his body bent, and his heart

in the dust, like a tree uprooted.

== Score ==
- Janáček, Leoš (1976). Potulný šílenec (score). Prague: Editio Supraphon (H 6003).

== Recordings ==
- Janáček, Leoš: Male Choruses CD, (Prague Philharmonic Choir, cond. Josef Veselka). Supraphon, recorded in 1977, published in 1995. (SU 3022-2 211)
