= Violin Sonata (Janáček) =

Composition by Leoš Janáček

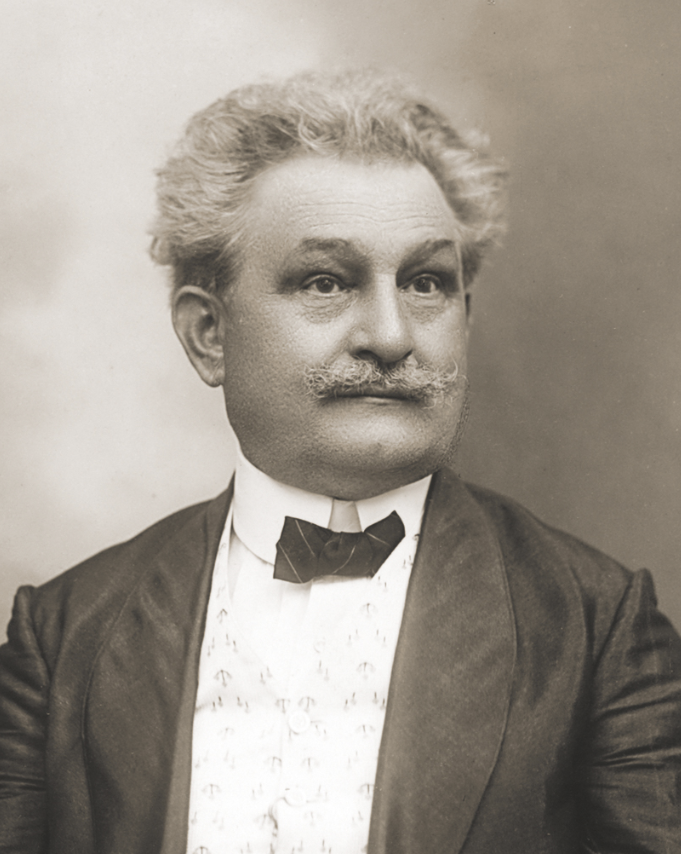
Leoš Janáček in 1914

Violin Sonata, a composition for violin and piano, is a work of the Czech composer Leoš Janáček (1854–1928). It was written in the summer of 1914, but it was not Janáček’s first attempt to create such a composition. He resolved to compose a violin sonata already as a student at the conservatoire in Leipzig in 1880, and later during his studies in Vienna. His early sonatas are today lost.

== Background ==
It took almost thirty-five years before Janáček returned to the composition of music for the same combination of instruments. The sonata was created in the period of composer’s marked interest in chamber music (Piano Trio (now lost), 1908, Pohádka (Fairy Tale) for cello and piano, 1910), and also at the beginning of World War I. The composer himself remembers: "...in the 1914 Sonata for violin and piano I could just about hear sound of the steel clashing in my troubled head...". The Sonata was printed after many corrections in mid-1922 by Hudební matice in Prague. Its first performance was given by violinist František Kudláček with Jaroslav Kvapil at the piano on 24 April 1922 at the concert of new Moravian music organized by the Young Composer’s Club in Brno. The first performance abroad took place in Frankfurt in 1923. The violin part was performed by the German composer Paul Hindemith.

== Structure ==
Janáček's Violin Sonata II. movement

Janáček's Violin Sonata III. movement

The sonata has four movements:

1. Con moto
2. Ballada
3. Allegretto
4. Adagio

== Alternative versions ==
The composer gave to Kudláček certain additions that are not extant in the published score, namely, pizzicati and a double stopped chord at the end of the trio section of the third movement. Kudláček passed these additions on to his student Bohdan Warchal, who in turn passed them on to Oliver Butterworth, who studied the sonata with him in Brno in 1970. These additions are performed in Butterworth's recording of the sonata (see the list of recordings below).

== Recordings ==
- Debussy, Janáček, Poulenc, Ježek: Violin Sonatas. Supraphon 1958. SU 3547-2 (Josef Suk - violin, Jan Panenka - piano)
- Janáček, Brahms, Beethoven: Sonatas. Supraphon 1992. SU 3857-2 (Josef Suk - violin, Rudolf Firkušný - piano)
- Janáček: Complete works for Violin, Cello and Piano. Carlton Classics 1996. 30366 00327 (Josef Suk - violin, Bohumila Jedličková - piano)
- Debussy, Janáček, Prokofiev: Sonatas for Violin and Piano. Philips 1995. 446 091-2 (Viktoria Mullova - violin, Piotr Anderszewski - piano)
- Janáček: Instrumental and Orchestral Works (2CD). EMI 2001. 7243 5 74844 2 8 (Pierre Amoyal - violin, Mikhail Rudy - piano)
- Beethoven, Schumann, Brahms, Prokofiev, Strauss, Messiaen, Busoni, Bartók, Janáček: Music for violin and piano (8CD). DGG B000204802 (2004) (Gidon Kremer, Martha Argerich)
- Debussy, Ravel, Janáček. EMI 857082 (2004) (Frank Peter Zimmermann, Alexander Lonquich)
- Bohemian Violin: Czech Music for Violin and Piano. Meridian Records 1999. CDE 84365 (Oliver Butterworth, violin, and John Bingham, piano)
- Janáček, Novák, Nedbal: Violin Sonatas. Supraphon 2009. SU 3978-2 (Ivan Ženatý - violin, Martin Kasík - piano)
