= Jan Sladký Kozina =

Czech revolutionary leader (1652–1695)

Jan Sladký Kozina

Jan Sladký Kozina (10 September 1652 – 26 November 1695) was a leader of the Chods peasant rebellion.

== Biography ==
Jan Sladký Kozina was born on 10 September 1652 in Újezd. He was first named Rosocha, after Rosoch Farm (U Rosochů), which from 1632 had belonged to his grandfather, and on which he was born and grew up. In 1670 his father Jan Sladký bought the farm "At Kozinas" (U Kozinů). All those originating from this farm were thereafter called Sladký-Kozina. On 9 May 1678, aged 25, he married Dorota Pelnářová, took over the ancestral farm U Kozinů, and took his place in the middle yeomanry. They seem to have gone on to live as a quiet, god-fearing couple. They had 6 sons but only one – Adam – had descendants.

He could neither read nor write, but made his name by his speeches, in which he drew attention to the abuses of the time, and became the spokesman for farmers' woes. He defended the rights of the Chodové people and demanded justice for the country people. This culminated in disagreement with the local magnate Wolf Maximilian Laminger von Albenreuth, also known as "Lomikar". Kozina was judged responsible for the peasant rebellion, arrested and executed in Plzeň on 28 November 1695.

== Legacy ==
He was immortalised as a figure of resistance in the stories of Alois Jirásek and Božena Němcová. In Újezd u Domažlic a memorial to him was set up; his place of execution is marked by a plaque just inside what is now the main entrance to the Pilsner Urquell brewery in Plzeň.

Alois Jirásek wrote the book Psohlavci ("The Dogheads"), which was about the Chodové people and young Jan's struggles; this was later turned into an opera of the same name by Karel Kovařovic.

In 1918, the newly formed 10th Infantry Shooting Regiment of the newly formed 3rd Division of the Czechoslovak Legions in Russia was named "Regiment Jan Sladký Kozina's of Hrádek".
