= Karel Kovařovic =

Czech composer and conductor

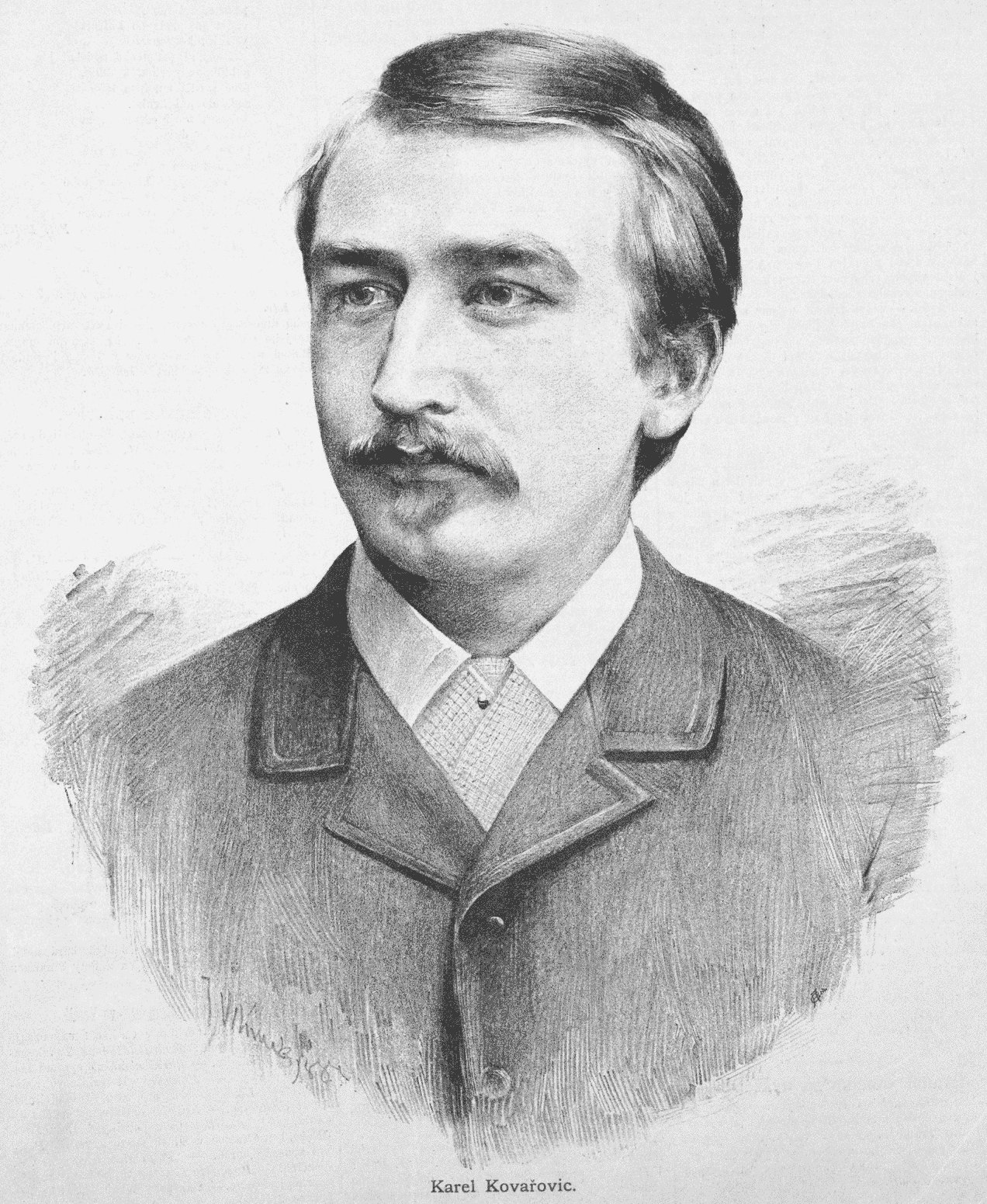
Portrait by Jan Vilímek

Karel Kovařovic (9 December 1862 – 6 December 1920) was a Czech composer and conductor from Prague.

== Life ==
From 1873 to 1879 he studied clarinet, harp and piano at the Prague Conservatory. He began his career as a harpist. In 1900 Kovařovic became the conductor of the national theatre in Prague, due mostly to the success of his opera Psohlavci (The Dogheads), after the novel of the same name (about Jan Sladký Kozina) by Alois Jirásek. His engagement at the National Theatre lasted twenty years, until 1920. He composed seven operas.

Kovařovic is most remembered today for the revisions he made to Leoš Janáček's Jenůfa for its premiere in Prague, and it was in his version that the opera was heard for many years.

A recording of The Dogheads, featuring Beno Blachut, exists.

== Compositions ==
=== Orchestra ===
- 1880 Předehra veseloherní (Comic overture)
- 1883 Únos Persefony, symphonic poem
- 1887 Concerto in f mineur, for piano and orchestra, op. 6
- 1892 Předehra dramatická (Dramatic overture)
- 1900 Fantasie from the opera "Prodaná nevěsta" of Bedřich Smetana
- Deux suites de ballet
- Gavotta, for violin and string quartet, op. 4
- Havířská polka (Miners' polka) from play Mr Brouček's excursion to the Exhibition (1894)
- Valčík (waltz), for chamber orchestra

=== Works for wind band ===
- 1911 Lustspiel Ouverture
- 1914 Vzpomínky
- Havířská polka

=== Theatre ===
==== Operas ====
Years composed	title	acts	première	libretto
1882–1883	Ženichové (The Bridgrooms)	3 acts	13 May 1884, Prague, Prague National Theatre	Antonín Koukl after Simeon Karel Macháček
1885	Cesta oknem (The Way through the Window), op. 4	1 act	11 February 1886, Prague, Prague National Theatre	Emanuel František Züngel, after Eugène Scribe and Gustave Lemoine
1890–1891	Noc Šimona a Judy (The Night of Saint Simon and Jude)	3 acts	5 November 1892, Prague National Theatre	Karel Šípek after Pedro Antonio de Alarcón
1891	Edip král (Oedipus rex)	3-act opera-parody	19 March 1894, Prague Žofín Hall	August Vojtěch Nevšímal after Sophocles
1895–1897	Psohlavci (The Dogheads)	3 acts, 6 scènes	24 April 1898, Prague National Theatre	Karel Šípek after Alois Jirásek
1898–1901	Na Starém bělidle (At the old bleachery)	4 scènes	22 November 1901, Prague National Theatre	Karel Šípek afterBožena Němcová
1905	Slib (The Promise)	Prologue only	9 December 1921, Prague, Prague National Theatre	Karel Šípek after R Zamrzla

==== Ballet ====
Composed in	title	acts	première	libretto	choreography
1884	Hašiš	1 act, 2 scenes	20 June 1884, Prague National Theatre		Václav Reisingra
1889	Pohádka o nalezeném štěstí (Fairy tale of found fortune)	3 acts, 7 scenes	8 April 1889, Prague National Theatre	Augustin Berger	
1889	Královničky (Little Queens)				
1889	Sedm havranů (Seven Ravens)				
1909	Na Záletech (Love Affairs)	10 scènes	1909, Prague		A. Viscusi

==== Incidental music ====
- 1918 Loutkářův sirotek, melodrama – text: Svatopluk Čech "Ve stínu lípy"
- Zlatý kolovrat, melodrama – text: Karel Jaromír Erben

=== Vocal music ===
==== Works for choir ====
- 1890 Královničky; staré obřadné tance moravské se zpěvy, for women (SSAA) en piano (of harmonium)

==== Song ====
- 1880 Osmero písní, for soprano and piano, op. 1
- 1885 Tři žertovné písně (Three humorous songs)
- 1887 Jarní květy (Spring blossoms), for soprano and piano, op. 7
- 1892–1893 Čtyři písně (Four songs), op. 18
  1. Der Abendstern – text: August Heinrich Hoffmann von Fallersleben
  2. Gottes Nähe
  3. Frühlings Mahnung – text: August Heinrich Hoffmann von Fallersleben
  4. Im Arm der Liebe schlummre ein – text: Georg Scheurlin
- 1897–1898 Dvě písně (Two songs), for soprano or tenor and piano
- 1915 Slovácká píseň, for high voice and piano – text: Ema Destinnová
- 1919 Svítání (Dayspring), for voice and orchestra – text: Vojtěch Martínek

=== Chamber music ===
- String quartet No 1 (1885)
- String quartet No 2 (1887)
- String quartet No 3 (1889)
- Romance for violin and piano, op. 2

=== Works for piano ===
- 1885 Co ti to napadá, polka
- 1910 Deux valses,
- 1910 Polka
- 1910 Deux mazurkas
- Čtverylka, quadrille
- Národní tance
  1. Pasačka
  2. Starodávný
  3. Holuběnka
- Naše vlast, fantasie
