= In the Mists =

Piano cycle by Leoš Janáček

- Piano cycle by Leoš Janáček
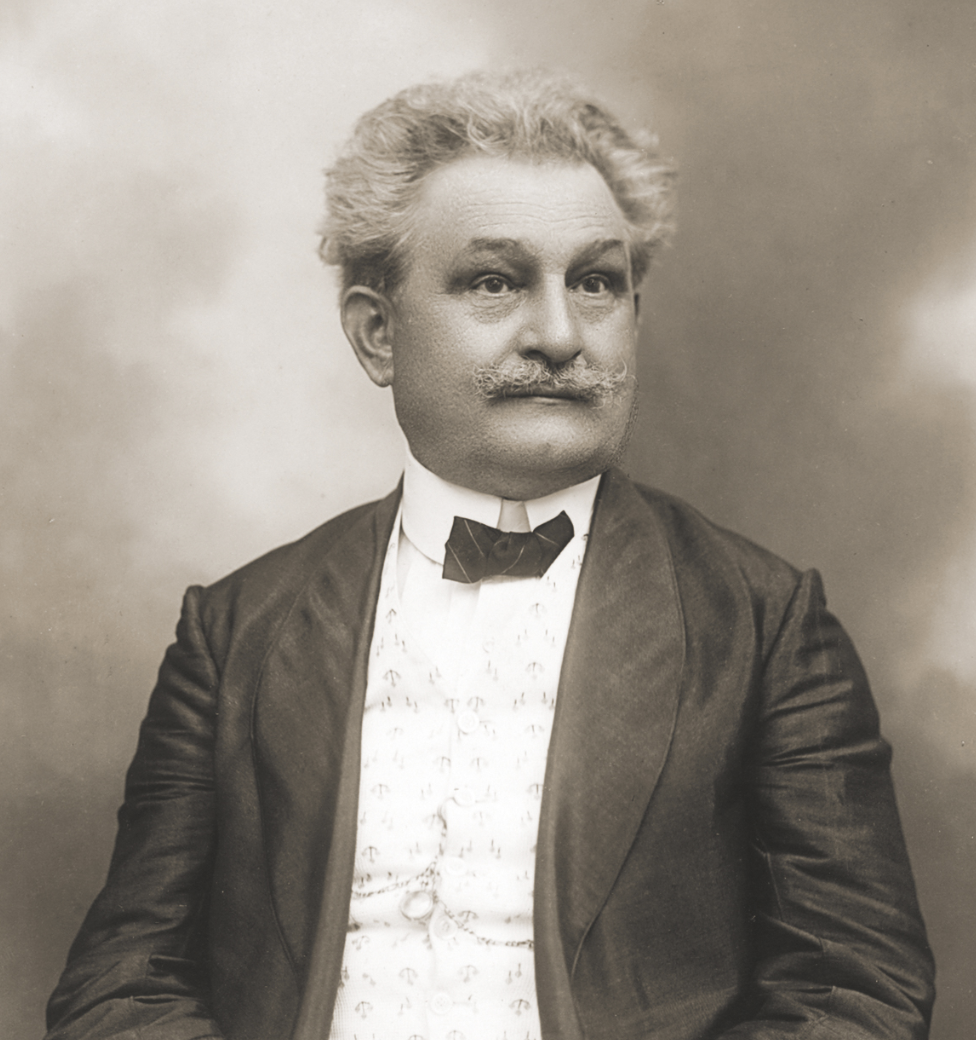
- The composer in 1914
- Native name: Czech: V mlhách
- Composed: 1912
- Performed: 7 December 1913
- Duration: 15 minutes
- Movements: 4

In the Mists (Czech: V mlhách) is a piano cycle by Czech composer Leoš Janáček, the last of his more substantial solo works for the instrument. It was composed in 1912, some years after Janáček had suffered the death of his daughter Olga and while his operas were still being rejected by the Prague opera houses. All four parts of the cycle are largely written in "misty" keys with five or six flats; characteristic of the cycle are the frequent changes of meter. Czech musicologist Jiří Zahrádka compared the atmosphere of the cycle to impressionist works, in particular those of Claude Debussy. The première took place on 7 December 1913, when Marie Dvořáková played it at a concert organized by the choral society Moravan in Kroměříž.

On January 24, 1914, the cycle had its first public performance at the third concert of the Organ School in Brno by pianist Marie Dvořáková, teacher of the school.

== Structure ==
The cycle consists of four parts:

1. Andante
2. Molto adagio
3. Andantino
4. Presto

A typical performance of the complete work runs 14 to 15 minutes in length.

== Manuscript version ==
After intensive studies of various sources, the German pianist Lars David Kellner published the first version of In the Mists on his 2013 Janáček album (The complete original works for piano), using Janáček's original manuscript.

== Arrangements ==
1. Arrangement suitable for: piano
  - arrangement for: cello and harp
  - arrangement by: Dan Reiter
  - performed by: vlc Dan Reiter, har Natalie Cox
