= Strakov =

- Municipality
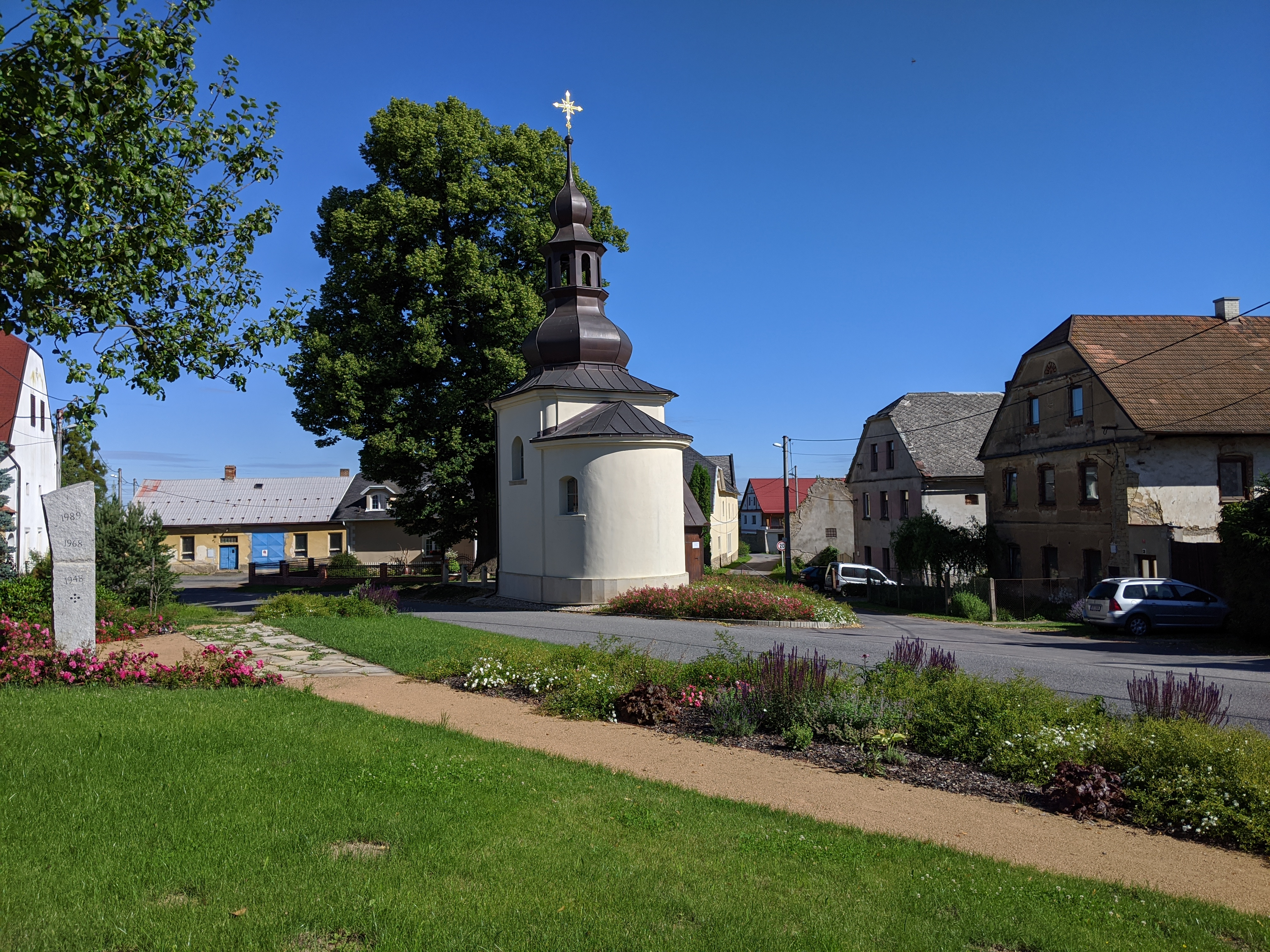
- Centre of Strakov

- Flag Coat of arms

- Location in the Czech Republic
- Coordinates: 49°52′0″N 16°22′0″E
- Country: Czech Republic
- Region: Pardubice
- District: Svitavy
- First mentioned: 1347

Area
  - Total: 8.53 km^{2} (3.29 sq mi)
- Elevation: 435 m (1,427 ft)

Population (2026-01-01)
  - Total: 267
  - Density: 31.3/km^{2} (81.1/sq mi)
- Time zone: UTC+1 (CET)
  - Summer (DST): UTC+2 (CEST)
- Postal code: 570 01
- Website: www.strakov.cz

Strakov is a municipality and village in Svitavy District in the Pardubice Region of the Czech Republic. It has about 300 inhabitants.

Strakov lies approximately 14 kilometres (9 mi) north-west of Svitavy, 48 km (30 mi) south-east of Pardubice, and 143 km (89 mi) east of Prague.

== Demographics ==
Historical population
Year	Pop.	±%
1869	373	—
1880	364	−2.4%
1890	323	−11.3%
1900	319	−1.2%
1910	311	−2.5%
1921	294	−5.5%
1930	295	+0.3%
1950	182	−38.3%
1961	221	+21.4%
1970	219	−0.9%
1980	206	−5.9%
1991	196	−4.9%
2001	226	+15.3%
2011	207	−8.4%
2021	245	+18.4%
Source: Censuses
