= Svitava (river) =

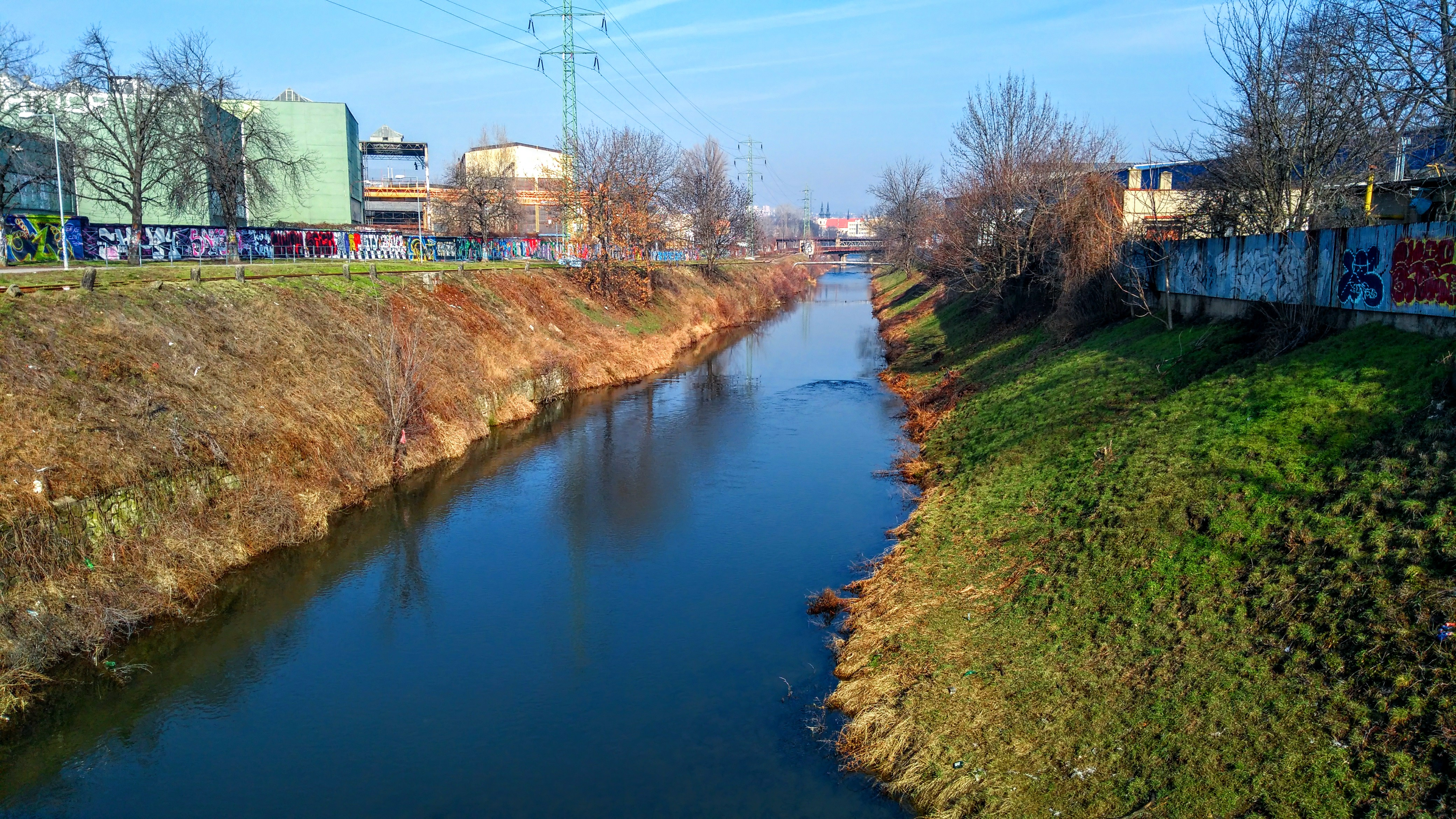
- The Svitava in Brno

Location
- Country: Czech Republic
- Regions: Pardubice; South Moravian

Physical characteristics
- Source
  - location: Svitavy, Svitavy Uplands
  - coordinates: 49°47′21″N 16°26′8″E
  - elevation: 472 m (1,549 ft)
- Mouth
  - location: Svratka
  - coordinates: 49°8′32″N 16°37′42″E
  - elevation: 191 m (627 ft)
- Length: 98.4 km (61.1 mi)
- Basin size: 1,149.4 km^{2} (443.8 sq mi)
- Discharge
  - average: 5.22 m^{3}/s (184 cu ft/s) near estuary

Basin features
- Progression: Svratka→ Thaya→ Morava→ Danube→ Black Sea

The Svitava (Czech pronunciation: [ˈsvɪtava]; German: Zwittawa) is a river in the Czech Republic, a left tributary of the Svratka River. It flows through the Pardubice and South Moravian regions. It is 98.4 km (61.1 mi) long.

== Etymology ==
The river's name referred to its clear water and was derived from svítat, which meant '[be] clear' in Old Czech. The river is first documented in 1125 in Chronica Boemorum.

== Characteristic ==
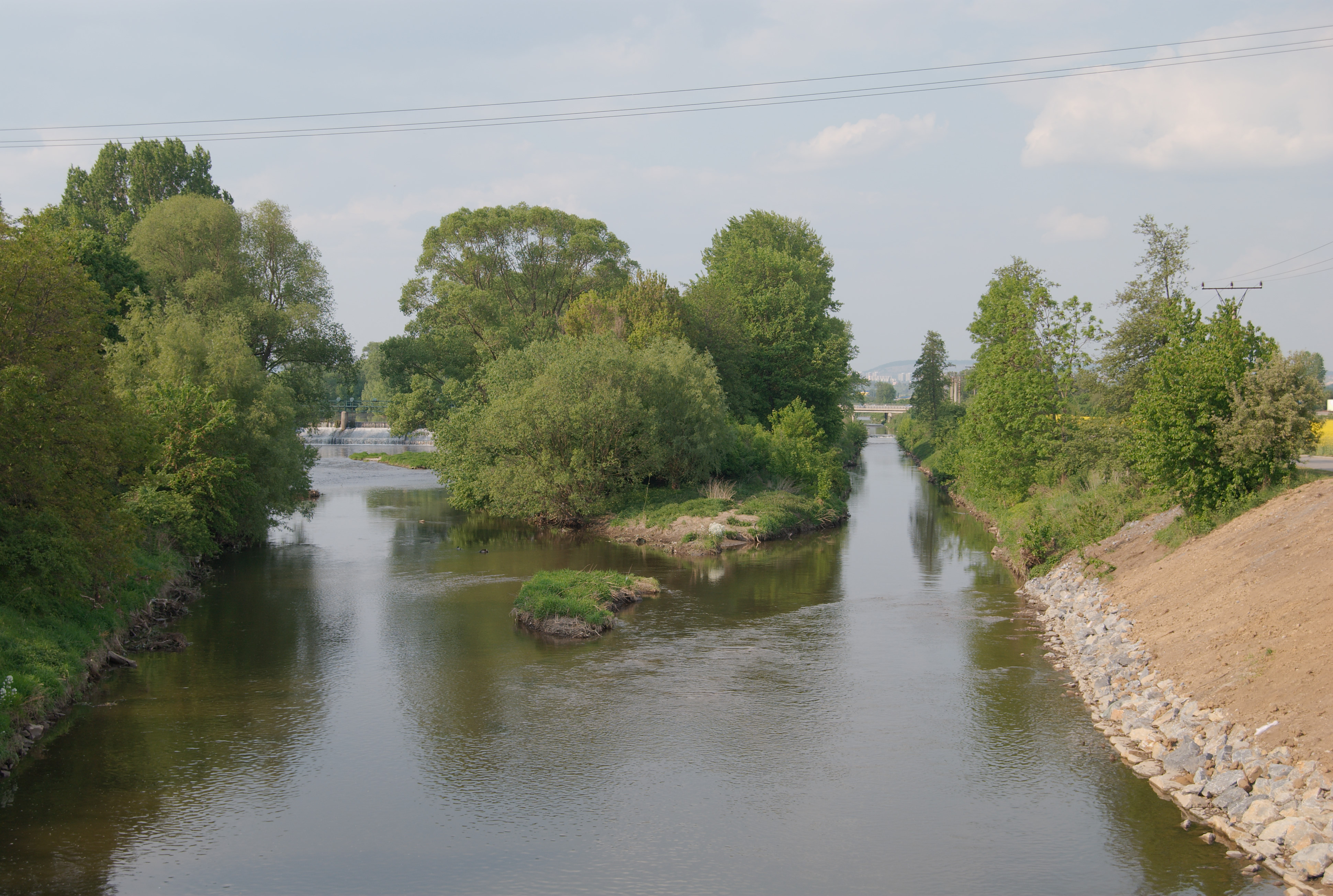
Confluence of the Svitava (right) and Svratka

The Svitava originates in the territory of Svitavy in the Svitavy Uplands at an elevation of 472 m (1,549 ft) and flows to Brno, where it enters the Svratka River at an elevation of 191 m (627 ft). It is 98.4 km (61.1 mi) long. Its drainage basin has an area of 1,149.4 km^{2} (443.8 sq mi).

The longest tributaries of the Svitava are:

| Tributary | Length (km) | River km | Side |
|---|---|---|---|
| Křetínka | 31.4 | 66.4 | right |
| Punkva | 26.4 | 32.9 | left |
| Bělá | 21.4 | 49.5 | left |
| Semíč | 17.9 | 55.2 | left |
| Býkovka | 16.1 | 40.6 | right |
| Úmoří | 16.0 | 51.2 | right |
| Křtinský potok | 15.5 | 24.7 | left |
| Vendolský potok | 8.9 | 88.1 | right |
| Radiměřský potok | 8.9 | 82.3 | right |

== Course ==
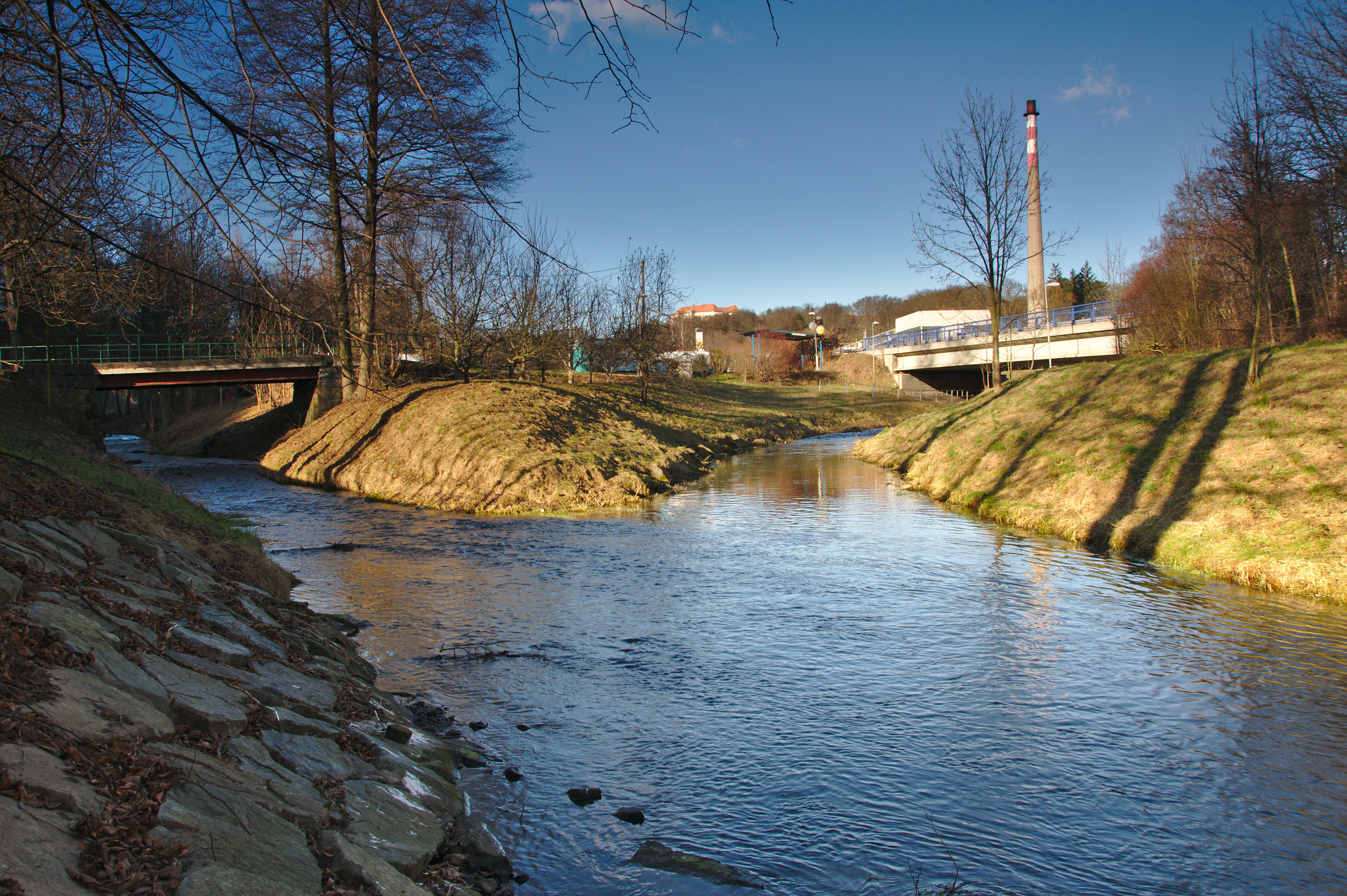
Counfluence of the Svitava (right) and Křetínka in Letovice

The river valley is densely populated and there are many relatively notable settlements on the river. Apart from the city of Brno, the most significant towns on the river are Svitavy, named after the river, and Blansko. The river flows through the municipal territories of Svitavy, Hradec nad Svitavou, Banín, Březová nad Svitavou, Brněnec, Rozhraní, Stvolová, Skrchov, Letovice, Svitávka, Boskovice, Skalice nad Svitavou, Lhota Rapotina, Doubravice nad Svitavou, Rájec-Jestřebí, Ráječko, Blansko, Olomučany, Adamov, Bílovice nad Svitavou and Brno.

== Bodies of water ==
There are 583 bodies of water in the basin area. The largest of them is the Letovice Reservoir with an area of 98 ha (240 acres), built on the Křetínka. Two fishponds are built on the upper course of the Svitava.

== Use ==
There are a large number of mills and hydroelectric power stations on the river.

== Tourism ==
The Svitava is suitable for river tourism. The river is navigable all year round, but there are many weirs on it. The most popular section for paddlers is between Letovice and Blansko.

== See also ==
- List of rivers of the Czech Republic
