= Březová nad Svitavou =

- Town
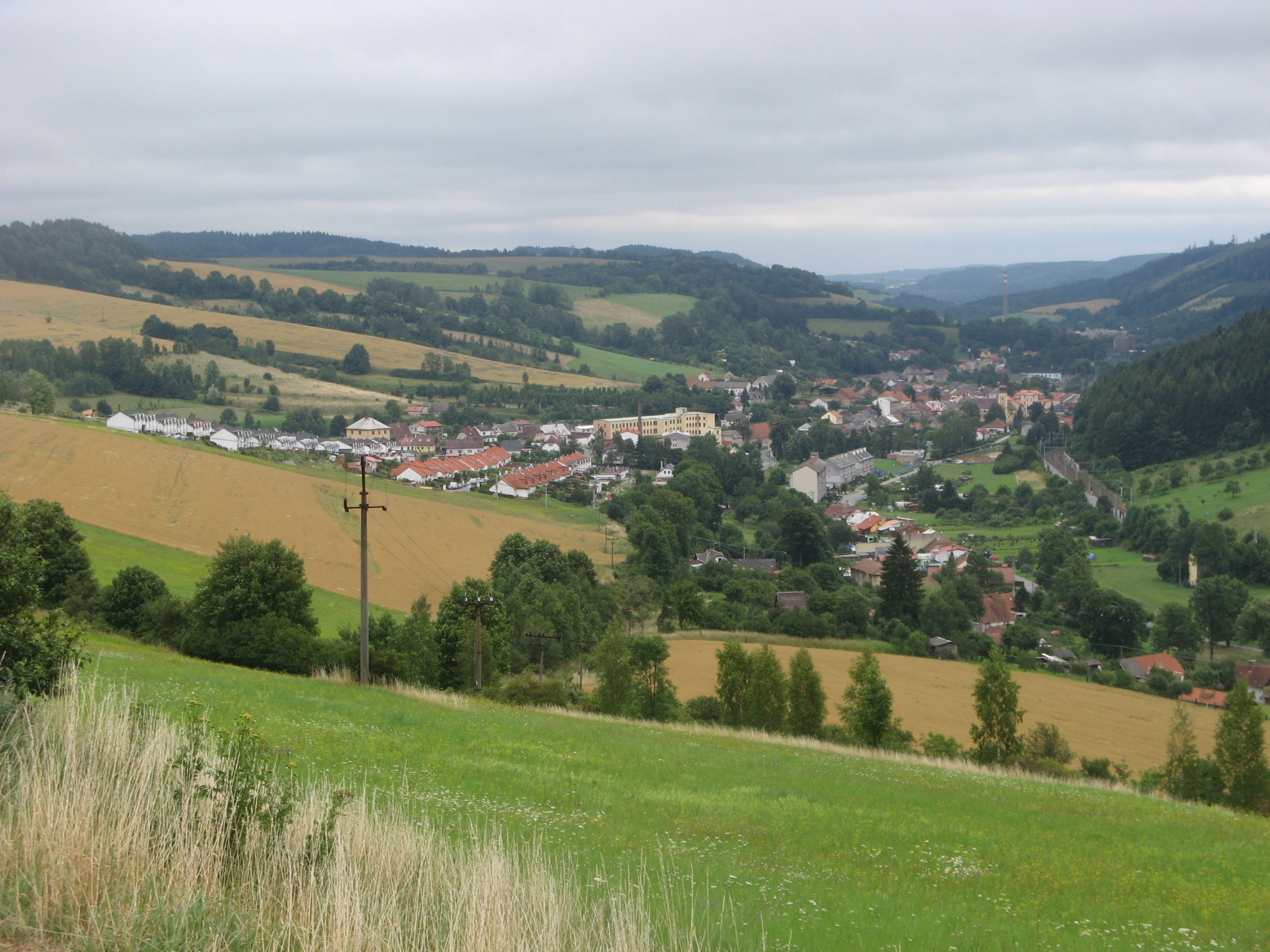
- View from the north

- Flag Coat of arms

- Location in the Czech Republic
- Coordinates: 49°38′39″N 16°31′5″E
- Country: Czech Republic
- Region: Pardubice
- District: Svitavy
- First mentioned: 1295

Government
  - Mayor: Karel Adámek

Area
  - Total: 12.70 km^{2} (4.90 sq mi)
- Elevation: 383 m (1,257 ft)

Population (2026-01-01)
  - Total: 1,578
  - Density: 124.3/km^{2} (321.8/sq mi)
- Time zone: UTC+1 (CET)
  - Summer (DST): UTC+2 (CEST)
- Postal code: 569 02
- Website: www.brezova.cz

Březová nad Svitavou (Czech pronunciation: [ˈbr̝ɛzovaː ˈnat svɪtavou]; until 1949 Březová; German: Brüsau) is a town in Svitavy District in the Pardubice Region of the Czech Republic. It has about 1,600 inhabitants. The town is located on the Svitava River in the Svitavy Uplands.

== Geography ==
Březová nad Svitavou is located about 12 kilometres (7 mi) south of Svitavy and 48 km (30 mi) north of Brno. It lies in the Svitavy Uplands. The highest point is at 557 m (1,827 ft) above sea level. The town is situated on the stretch of the Svitava River, which marked the historical border between Bohemia and Moravia.

== History ==
Březová was founded in around 1300. In 1497, it was promoted to a town by King Vladislaus II. From the end of the 15th century, cloth production developed. In the 16th century, other crafts flourished and Březová developed rapidly. From 1784, flax production developed. In the middle of the 18th century, a road was built through the town that connected Prague with Brno and Vienna, which helped the success of local manufactures.

The greatest development of the industry occurred after 1849, when the railway was built. The town was mainly focused on the textile industry. New residents, mainly of German ethnicity, came to work in the factories. In the 20th century, there was an outflow of inhabitants to the surrounding villages. In 1938, the town was annexed by Nazi Germany and administered as part of the Reichsgau Sudetenland. After World War II, the Germans were expelled and the population continued to decline.

In 1949, the name was changed from Březová to Březová nad Svitavou.

== Demographics ==
Historical population

Year	Pop.	±%
1869	2,443	—
1880	2,825	+15.6%
1890	2,480	−12.2%
1900	2,614	+5.4%
1910	2,758	+5.5%

Year	Pop.	±%
1921	2,550	−7.5%
1930	2,238	−12.2%
1950	1,540	−31.2%
1961	1,643	+6.7%
1970	1,490	−9.3%

Year	Pop.	±%
1980	1,500	+0.7%
1991	1,376	−8.3%
2001	1,379	+0.2%
2011	1,691	+22.6%
2021	1,566	−7.4%

Source: Censuses

== Transport ==
The I/43 road (part of the European route E461) from Brno to Svitavy runs through the town.

Březová nad Svitavou is located on the main railway line heading from Prague to Brno.

== Sights ==
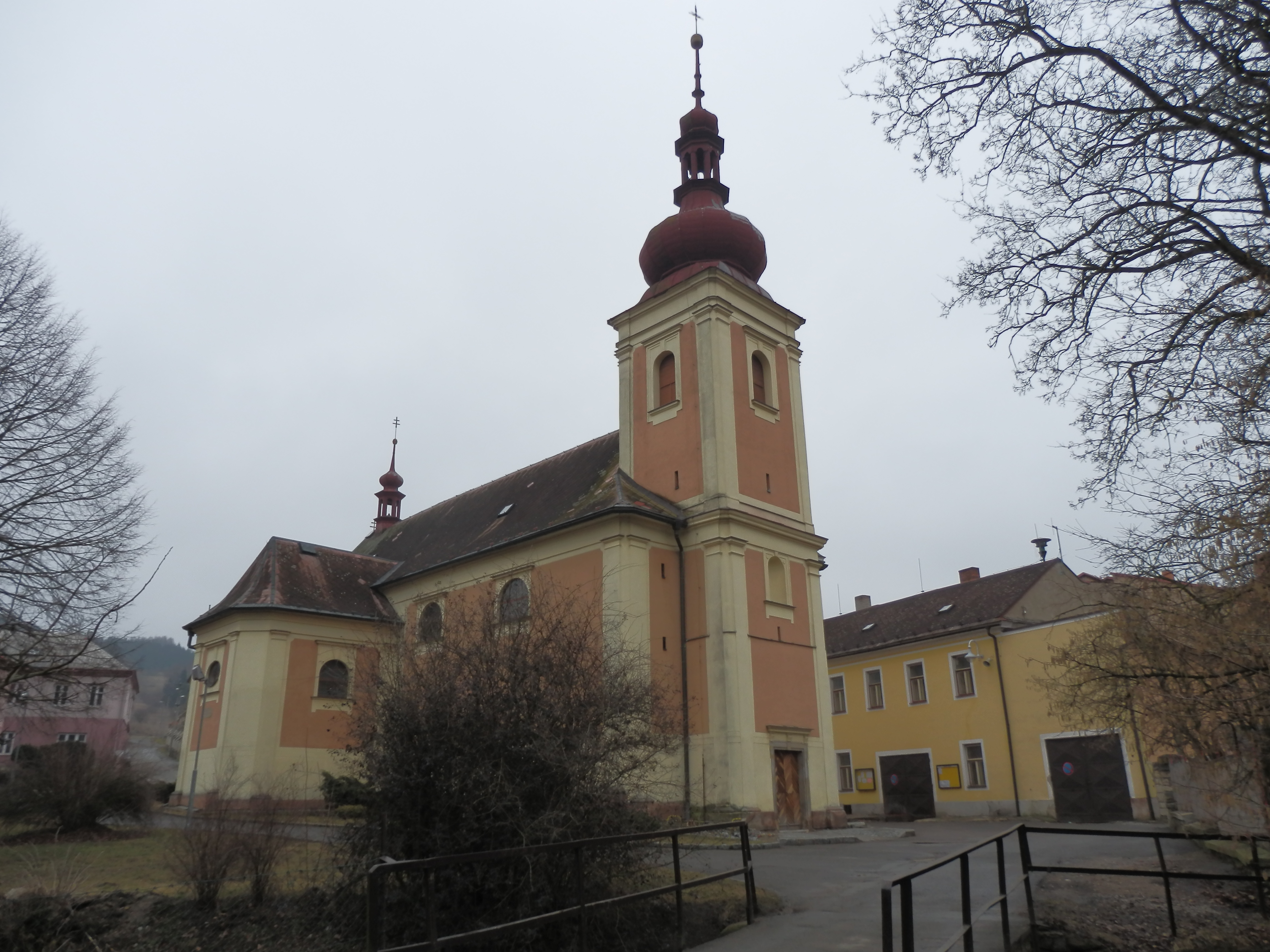
Church of Saint Bartholomew

The main landmark of Březová nad Svitavou is the Church of Saint Bartholomew. It was built in the Baroque style in 1721–1725. In front of the church stands an early Baroque column with a statue of the Madonna from 1690.

== Notable people ==
- Karl Kořistka (1825–1906), geographer, cartographer and mathematician
