= Svitávka =

- Market town
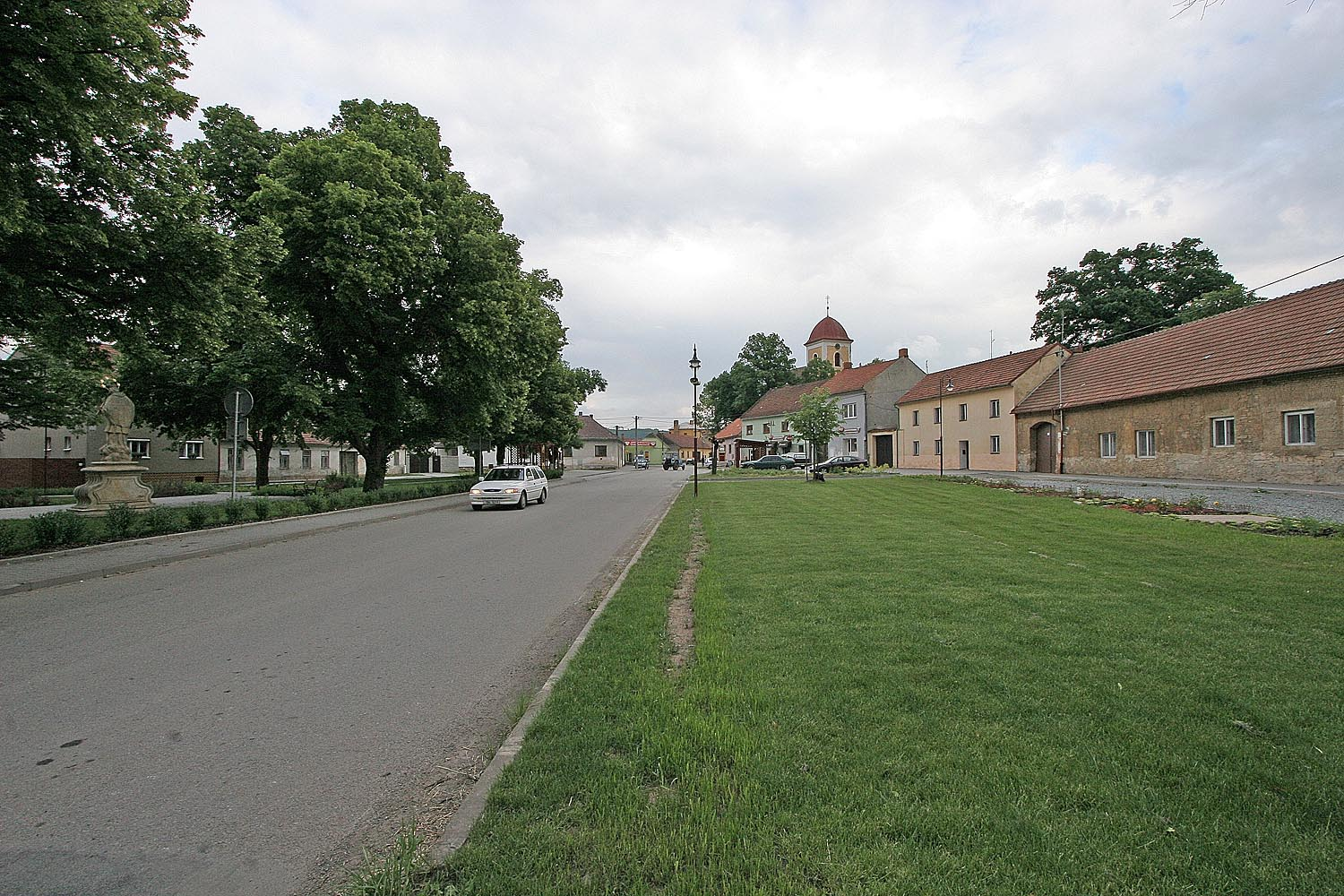
- Centre of Svitávka

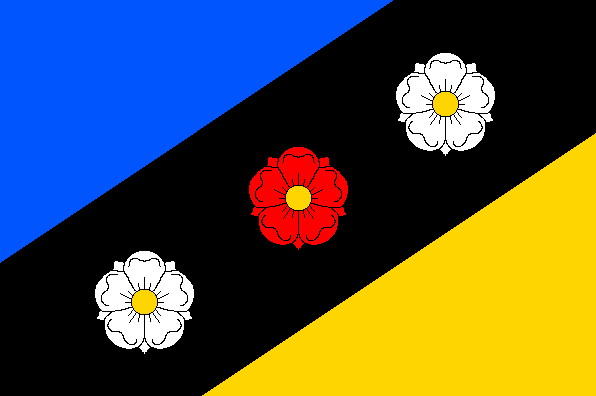
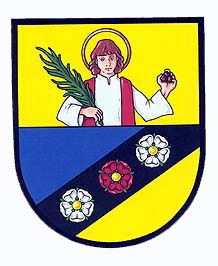
- Flag Coat of arms

- Location in the Czech Republic
- Coordinates: 49°30′6″N 16°35′53″E
- Country: Czech Republic
- Region: South Moravian
- District: Blansko
- First mentioned: 1284

Area
  - Total: 8.27 km^{2} (3.19 sq mi)
- Elevation: 314 m (1,030 ft)

Population (2026-01-01)
  - Total: 1,965
  - Density: 238/km^{2} (615/sq mi)
- Time zone: UTC+1 (CET)
  - Summer (DST): UTC+2 (CEST)
- Postal code: 679 32
- Website: www.mestys-svitavka.cz

Svitávka (Czech pronunciation: [ˈsvɪtaːfka]) is a market town in Blansko District in the South Moravian Region of the Czech Republic. It has about 2,000 inhabitants. It is located on the Svitava River.

== Administrative division ==
Svitávka consists of two municipal parts (in brackets population according to the 2021 census):

- Svitávka (1,655)
- Sasina (102)

== Etymology ==
The name Svitávka is a diminutive of 'Svitava'.

== Geography ==
Svitávka is located about 15 kilometres (9 mi) north of Blansko and 31 km (19 mi) north of Brno. It lies mostly in the Boskovice Furrow, only the western part of the municipal territory extends into the Upper Svratka Highlands. The highest point is at 459 m (1,506 ft) above sea level. The Svitava River flows through the market town.

== History ==
The area was populated already in the stone age. A document that supposedly dates from 1201 and mentioned the existence of Svitávka in 1169 was a proven forgery from the 14th century. The first written mention of Svitávka is from 1284, when the village was owned by the Hradisko Monastery in Olomouc and King Wenceslaus II approved fortification of the village and thus promoted it to a market town. In 1461, Svitávka was acquired by Lords of Boskovice. Later Svitávka became again a village, but in 1583, Emperor Rudolf II promoted it again to a market town. During the Thirty Years' War, Svitávka was looted by the Swedish army.

== Demographics ==
Historical population

| Year | Pop. | ±% |
|---|---|---|
| 1869 | 1,380 | — |
| 1880 | 1,558 | +12.9% |
| 1890 | 1,667 | +7.0% |
| 1900 | 1,809 | +8.5% |
| 1910 | 2,385 | +31.8% |

| Year | Pop. | ±% |
|---|---|---|
| 1921 | 2,350 | −1.5% |
| 1930 | 2,462 | +4.8% |
| 1950 | 2,024 | −17.8% |
| 1961 | 2,070 | +2.3% |
| 1970 | 2,032 | −1.8% |

| Year | Pop. | ±% |
|---|---|---|
| 1980 | 1,873 | −7.8% |
| 1991 | 1,615 | −13.8% |
| 2001 | 1,683 | +4.2% |
| 2011 | 1,693 | +0.6% |
| 2021 | 1,757 | +3.8% |

Source: Censuses

== Transport ==
The I/43 road (part of the European route E461) from Brno to Svitavy runs west of the market town.

Svitávka is located on the railway line Letovice–Křenovice via Brno.

== Sights ==
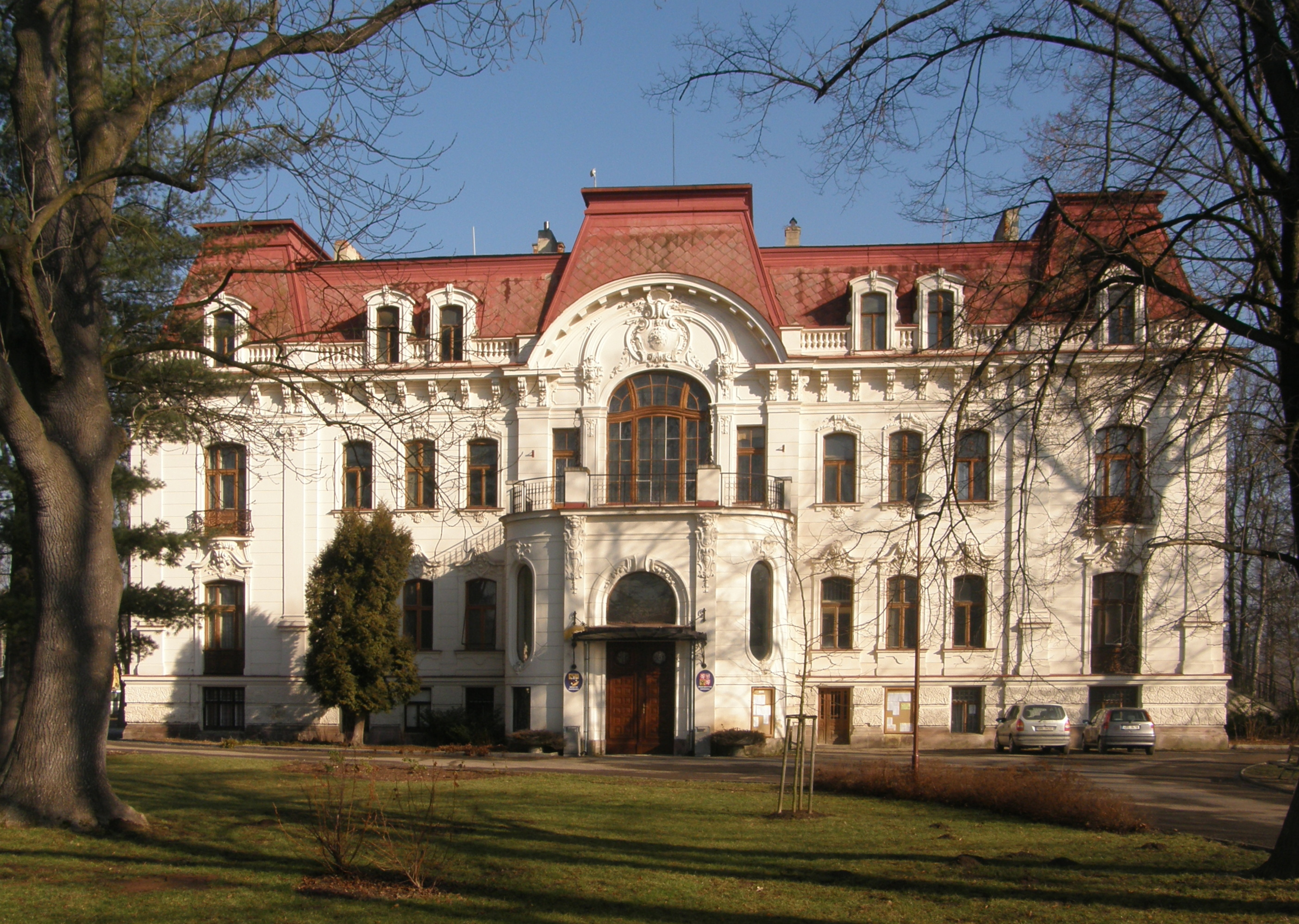
Great Löw-Beer Villa, now the municipal office

The main landmark of Svitávka is the Church of Saint John the Baptist. It was built in the Baroque style in 1703. After the church burned down in 1793, it was completely rebuilt in the late Baroque style in the same year. The core of the bell tower has a medieval origin and includes a bell from 1530.

A notable building is the Great Löw-Beer Villa. It was built in the Historicist style in 1900–1902 for the Löw-Beer family. Today, it houses, among other things, the municipal office and the municipal library. Near the villa is the Small Löw-Beer Villa from 1906, also protected as a cultural monument for its architectural value.
