= Vendolí =

- Municipality
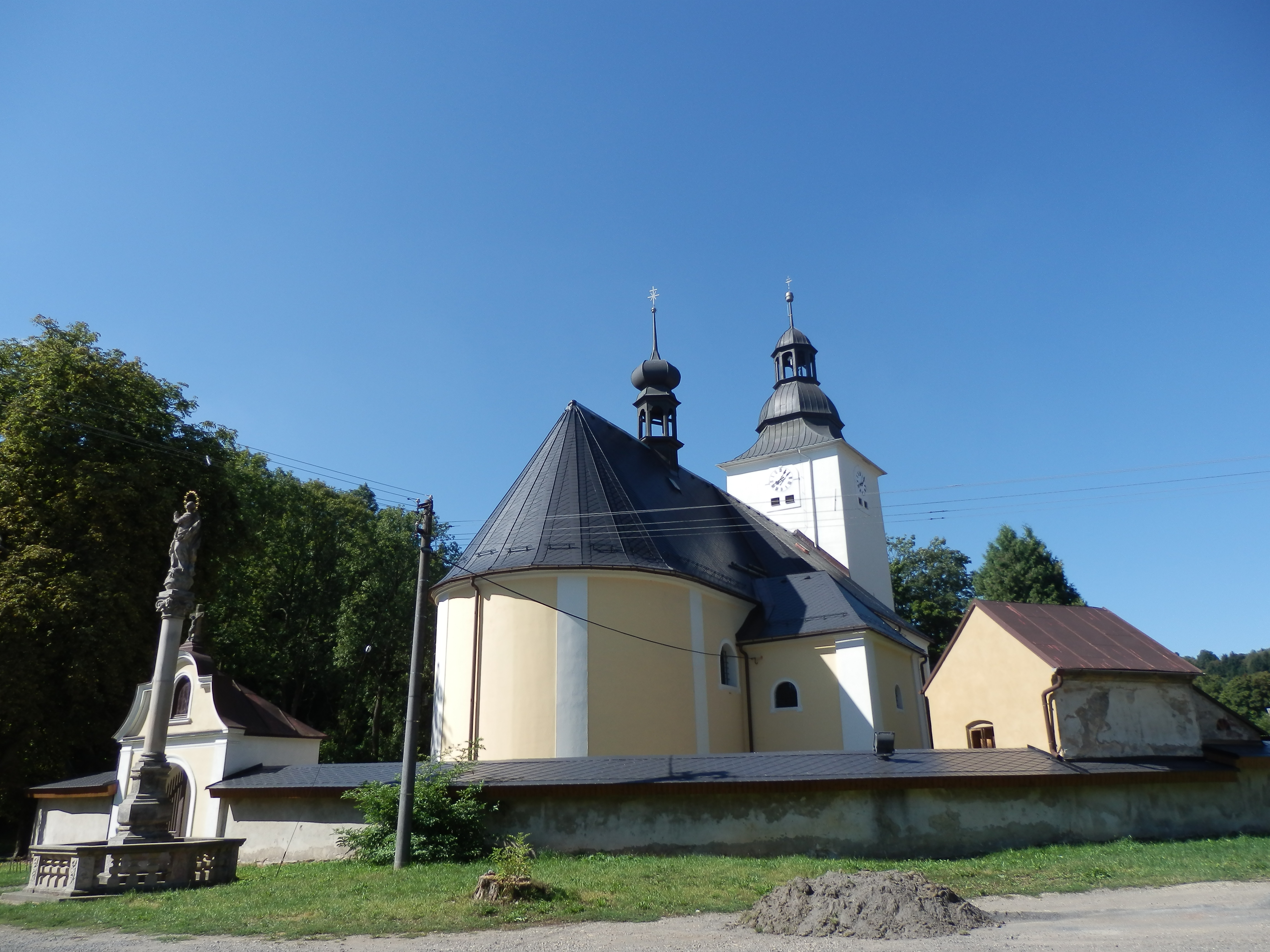
- Church of Saint Andrew

- Flag Coat of arms

- Location in the Czech Republic
- Coordinates: 49°44′23″N 16°24′48″E
- Country: Czech Republic
- Region: Pardubice
- District: Svitavy
- First mentioned: 1320

Area
  - Total: 20.71 km^{2} (8.00 sq mi)
- Elevation: 480 m (1,570 ft)

Population (2026-01-01)
  - Total: 988
  - Density: 47.7/km^{2} (124/sq mi)
- Time zone: UTC+1 (CET)
  - Summer (DST): UTC+2 (CEST)
- Postal code: 569 14
- Website: www.obec-vendoli.cz

Vendolí is a municipality and village in Svitavy District in the Pardubice Region of the Czech Republic. It has about 1,000 inhabitants.

Vendolí lies approximately 5 kilometres (3 mi) south-west of Svitavy, 57 km (35 mi) south-east of Pardubice, and 148 km (92 mi) east of Prague.

== Demographics ==
Historical population
Year	Pop.	±%
1869	1,401	—
1880	1,474	+5.2%
1890	1,541	+4.5%
1900	1,607	+4.3%
1910	1,675	+4.2%
1921	1,581	−5.6%
1930	1,581	+0.0%
1950	1,076	−31.9%
1961	1,016	−5.6%
1970	999	−1.7%
1980	932	−6.7%
1991	865	−7.2%
2001	880	+1.7%
2011	939	+6.7%
2021	943	+0.4%
Source: Censuses
