= Chotěnov =

- Municipality
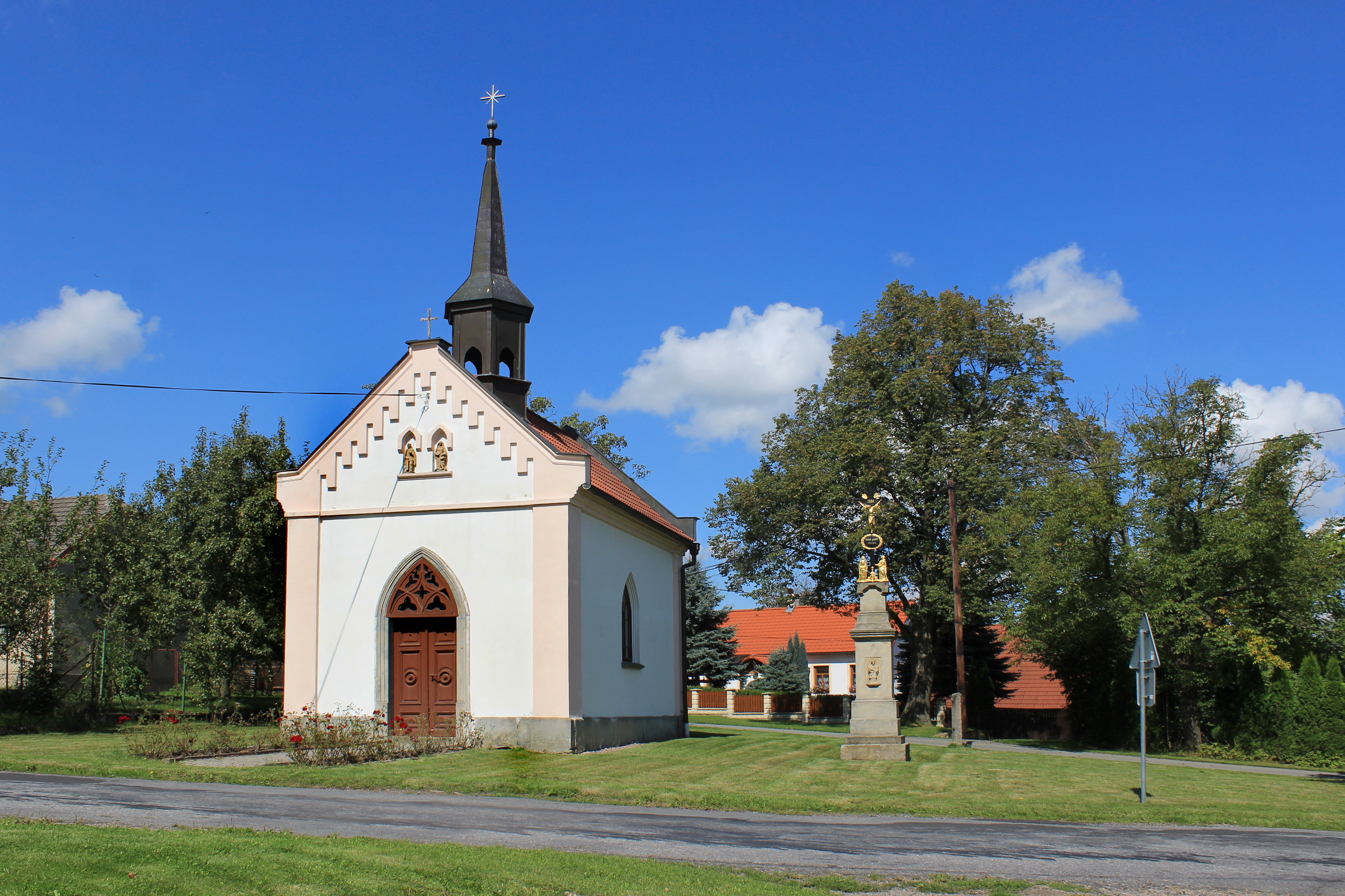
- Chapel of the Assumption of the Virgin Mary

- Flag Coat of arms

- Location in the Czech Republic
- Coordinates: 49°49′24″N 16°11′24″E
- Country: Czech Republic
- Region: Pardubice
- District: Svitavy
- First mentioned: 1347

Area
  - Total: 4.00 km^{2} (1.54 sq mi)
- Elevation: 494 m (1,621 ft)

Population (2026-01-01)
  - Total: 138
  - Density: 34.5/km^{2} (89.4/sq mi)
- Time zone: UTC+1 (CET)
  - Summer (DST): UTC+2 (CEST)
- Postal code: 570 01
- Website: www.chotenov.cz

Chotěnov is a municipality and village in Svitavy District in the Pardubice Region of the Czech Republic. It has about 100 inhabitants.

Chotěnov lies approximately 22 kilometres (14 mi) west of Svitavy, 38 km (24 mi) south-east of Pardubice, and 130 km (81 mi) east of Prague.

== Demographics ==
Historical population
| Year | Pop. | ±% |
|---|---|---|
| 1869 | 353 | — |
| 1880 | 357 | +1.1% |
| 1890 | 356 | −0.3% |
| 1900 | 344 | −3.4% |
| 1910 | 366 | +6.4% |
| 1921 | 375 | +2.5% |
| 1930 | 335 | −10.7% |
| 1950 | 225 | −32.8% |
| 1961 | 216 | −4.0% |
| 1970 | 188 | −13.0% |
| 1980 | 160 | −14.9% |
| 1991 | 139 | −13.1% |
| 2001 | 133 | −4.3% |
| 2011 | 132 | −0.8% |
| 2021 | 123 | −6.8% |
Source: Censuses
