= Zdeněk Kroupa =

Czech opera singer

Zdeněk Kroupa (15 November 1921 in Adamov – 7 January 1999 in Brno) was a Czech opera singer. His wife became lifelong soloist of the National Theatre in Mira Figarova.

== Life ==
Kroupa inherited his talent from his mother, who worked in amateur theater. Kroupa worked in construction before he began taking private lessons in singing and joining the Czech State Theatre in Brno. He had his first solo in August 1946. In 1970, he joined the Provincial Theatre in Linz, working there until his retirement in 1991.

He received two significant awards during his tenure with the Provincial Theatre. In 1973, he received an award for artistic achievement for his performance in Příhody lišky Bystroušky (Cunning Little Vixen), an opera by Leoš Janáček. In 1979, the Czech Ministry of Culture came him a Medal of Merit for the dissemination of works by that same composer.
