= Stvolová =

- Municipality
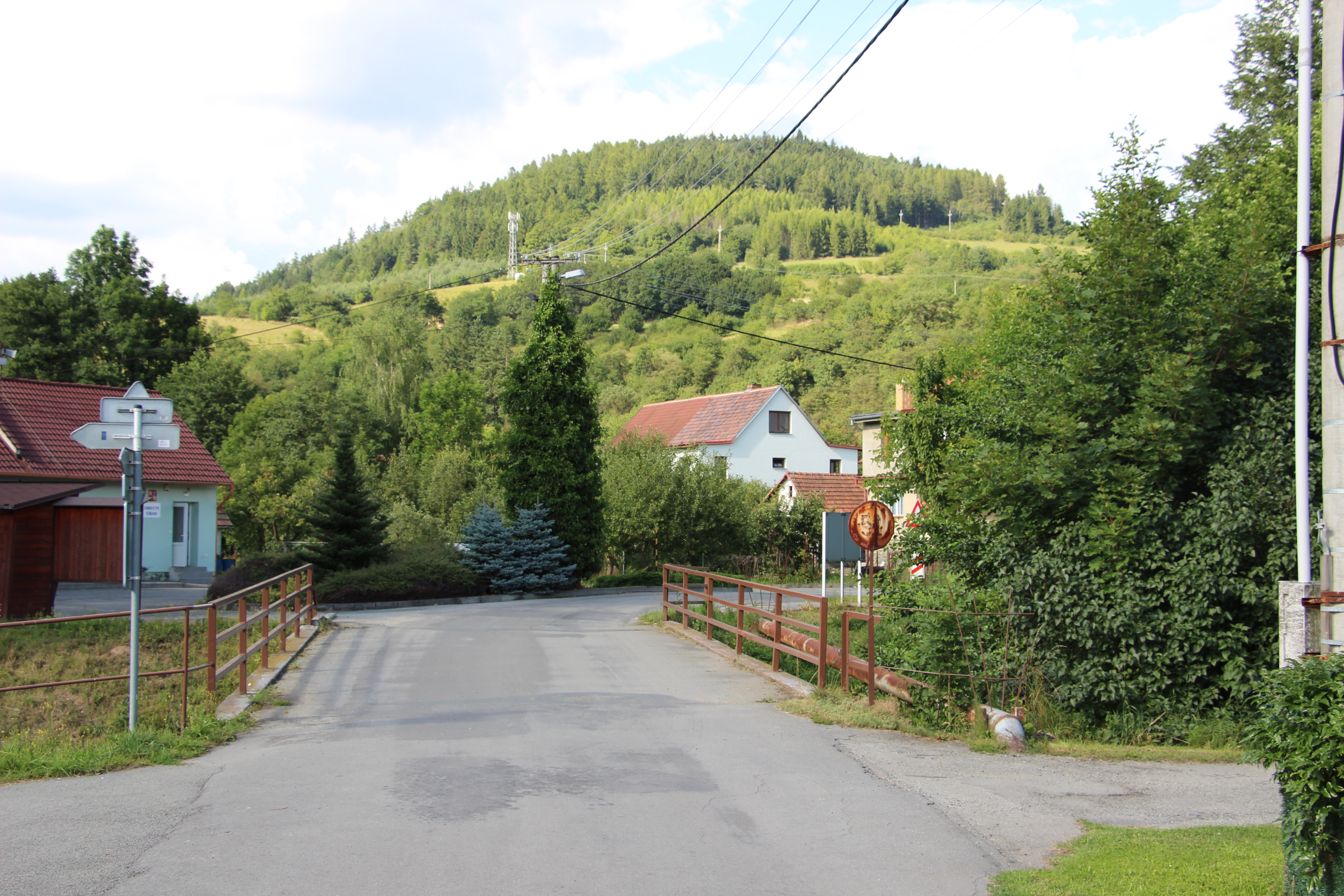
- Bridge over the Svitava River

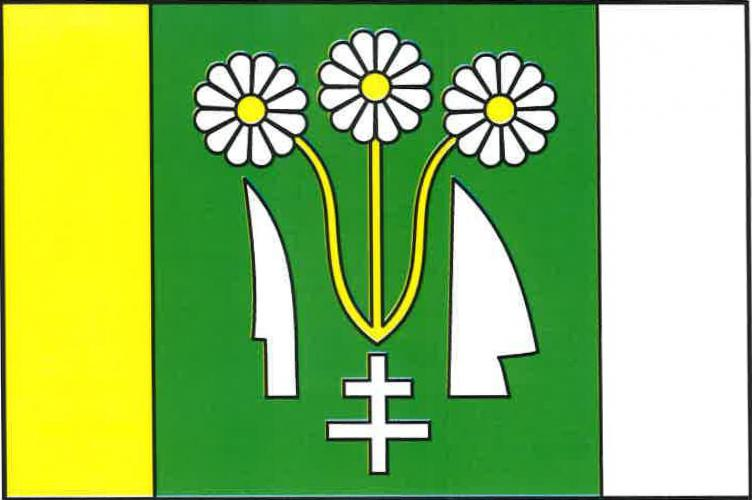
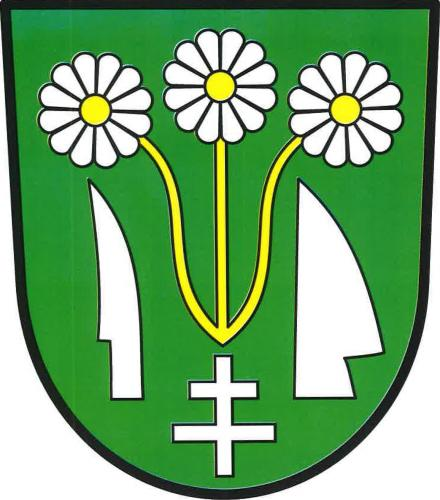
- Flag Coat of arms

- Location in the Czech Republic
- Coordinates: 49°35′21″N 16°32′26″E
- Country: Czech Republic
- Region: South Moravian
- District: Blansko
- First mentioned: 1320

Area
  - Total: 3.75 km^{2} (1.45 sq mi)
- Elevation: 351 m (1,152 ft)

Population (2026-01-01)
  - Total: 165
  - Density: 44.0/km^{2} (114/sq mi)
- Time zone: UTC+1 (CET)
  - Summer (DST): UTC+2 (CEST)
- Postal code: 679 61
- Website: www.stvolova.cz

Stvolová is a municipality and village in Blansko District in the South Moravian Region of the Czech Republic. It has about 200 inhabitants. It lies on the Svitava River.

Stvolová lies approximately 26 kilometres (16 mi) north of Blansko, 44 km (27 mi) north of Brno, and 162 km (101 mi) east of Prague.

== Administrative division ==
Stvolová consists of three municipal parts (in brackets population according to the 2021 census):

- Stvolová (60)
- Skřib (51)
- Vlkov (54)

== Demographics ==
Historical population
Year	Pop.	±%
1869	284	—
1880	299	+5.3%
1890	299	+0.0%
1900	330	+10.4%
1910	382	+15.8%
1921	343	−10.2%
1930	333	−2.9%
1950	259	−22.2%
1961	247	−4.6%
1970	226	−8.5%
1980	190	−15.9%
1991	162	−14.7%
2001	164	+1.2%
2011	136	−17.1%
2021	165	+21.3%
Source: Censuses
