= Adamov (Blansko District) =

- Town
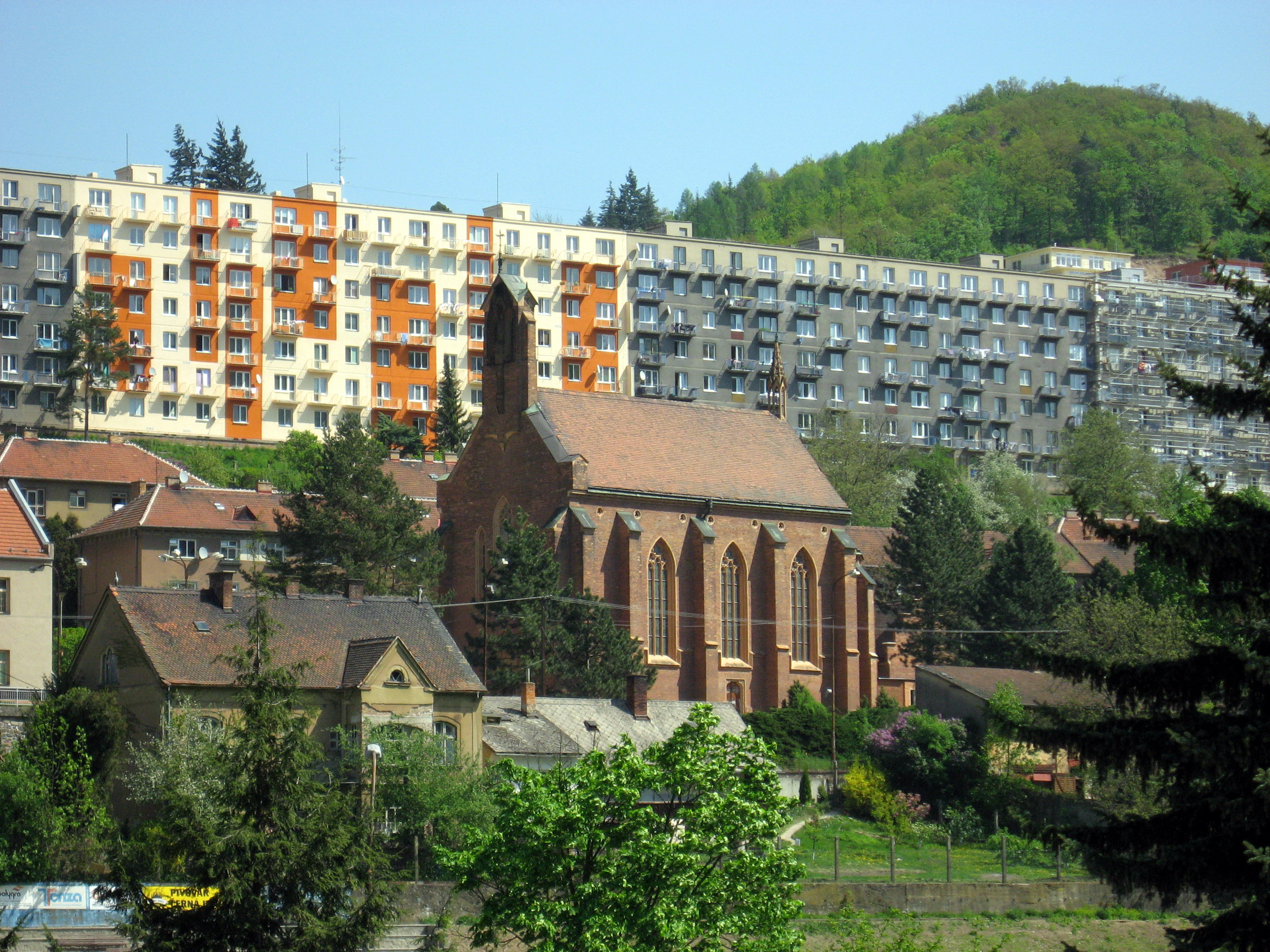
- Church of Saint Barbara

- Flag Coat of arms

- Location in the Czech Republic
- Coordinates: 49°18′2″N 16°39′31″E
- Country: Czech Republic
- Region: South Moravian
- District: Blansko
- First mentioned: 1506

Government
  - Mayor: Roman Pilát

Area
  - Total: 3.78 km^{2} (1.46 sq mi)
- Elevation: 258 m (846 ft)

Population (2026-01-01)
  - Total: 4,564
  - Density: 1,210/km^{2} (3,130/sq mi)
- Time zone: UTC+1 (CET)
  - Summer (DST): UTC+2 (CEST)
- Postal code: 679 04
- Website: www.adamov.cz

Adamov (Czech pronunciation: [ˈadamof]; German: Adamsthal) is a town in Blansko District in the South Moravian Region of the Czech Republic. It has about 4,600 inhabitants. The town is located in the valley of the Svitava River, in the Drahany Highlands.

Adamov is historically known as an industrial town. The former industrial area of Stará Huť is protected as a monument reservation.

== Geography ==
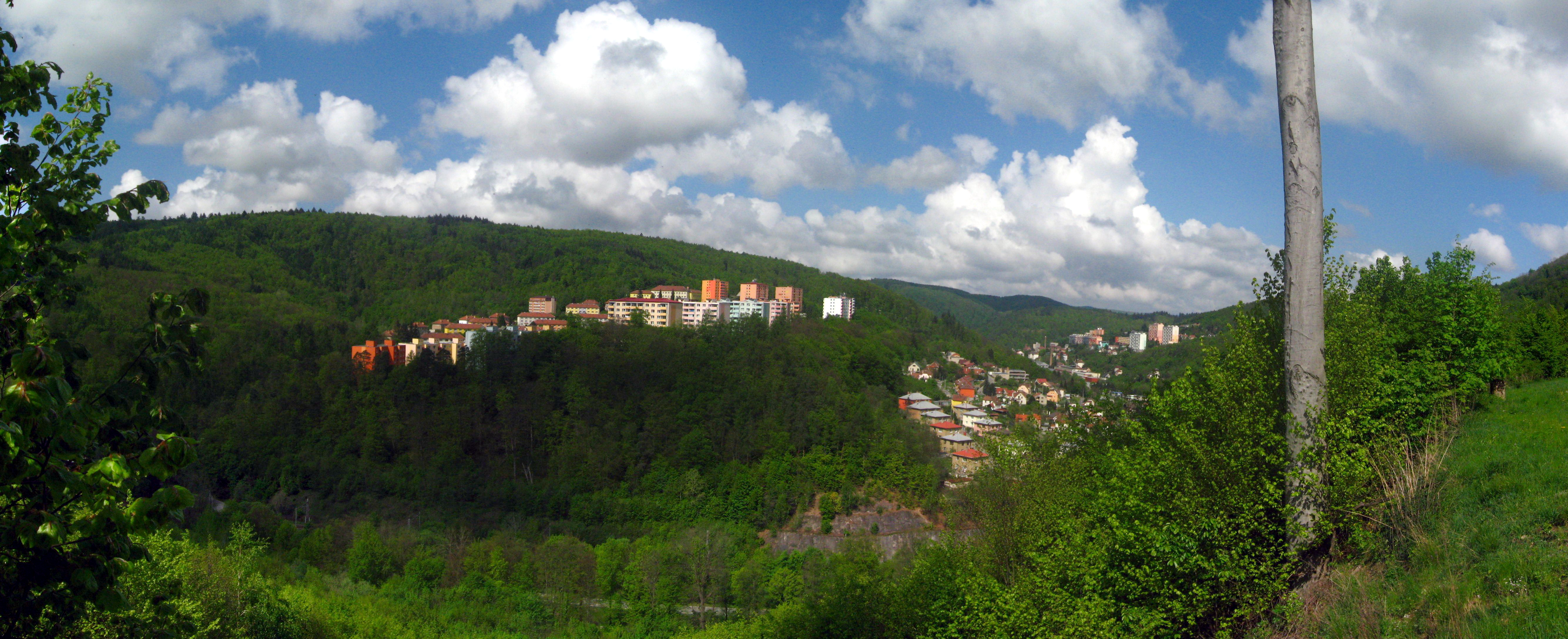
Adamov landscape panorama

Adamov is located about 6 kilometres (4 mi) south of Blansko and 10 km (6 mi) north of Brno. It lies in the Drahany Highlands, on the border of the Moravian Karst Protected Landscape Area. The highest point is at 445 m (1,460 ft) above sea level. The town is situated in the valley of the Svitava River.

== History ==
The first written mention of Adamov is from 1506, under its old name Hamry. It was a hamlet with several hammer mills. From 1597, it was owned by the Liechtenstein family. In 1679, it was first called Adamov and since 1732, the name has been official.

In 1849, the railway was built, which helped the development of local industry and population growth. In the second half of the 19th century, the local ironworks were transformed into an engineering company. Agricultural machinery and equipment for agriculture were produced here.

During World War I and in the 1930s, the company refocused on the arms industry. Production expanded, the number of employees increased, and a new district with family houses was established in the town in the 1930s and again in the 1950s. The population grew rapidly and in 1964 Adamov became a town.

== Demographics ==
Historical population

Year	Pop.	±%
1869	902	—
1880	953	+5.7%
1890	728	−23.6%
1900	792	+8.8%
1910	816	+3.0%

Year	Pop.	±%
1921	998	+22.3%
1930	1,148	+15.0%
1950	2,090	+82.1%
1961	3,139	+50.2%
1970	3,787	+20.6%

Year	Pop.	±%
1980	5,088	+34.4%
1991	5,089	+0.0%
2001	4,970	−2.3%
2011	4,591	−7.6%
2021	4,446	−3.2%

Source: Censuses

== Economy ==
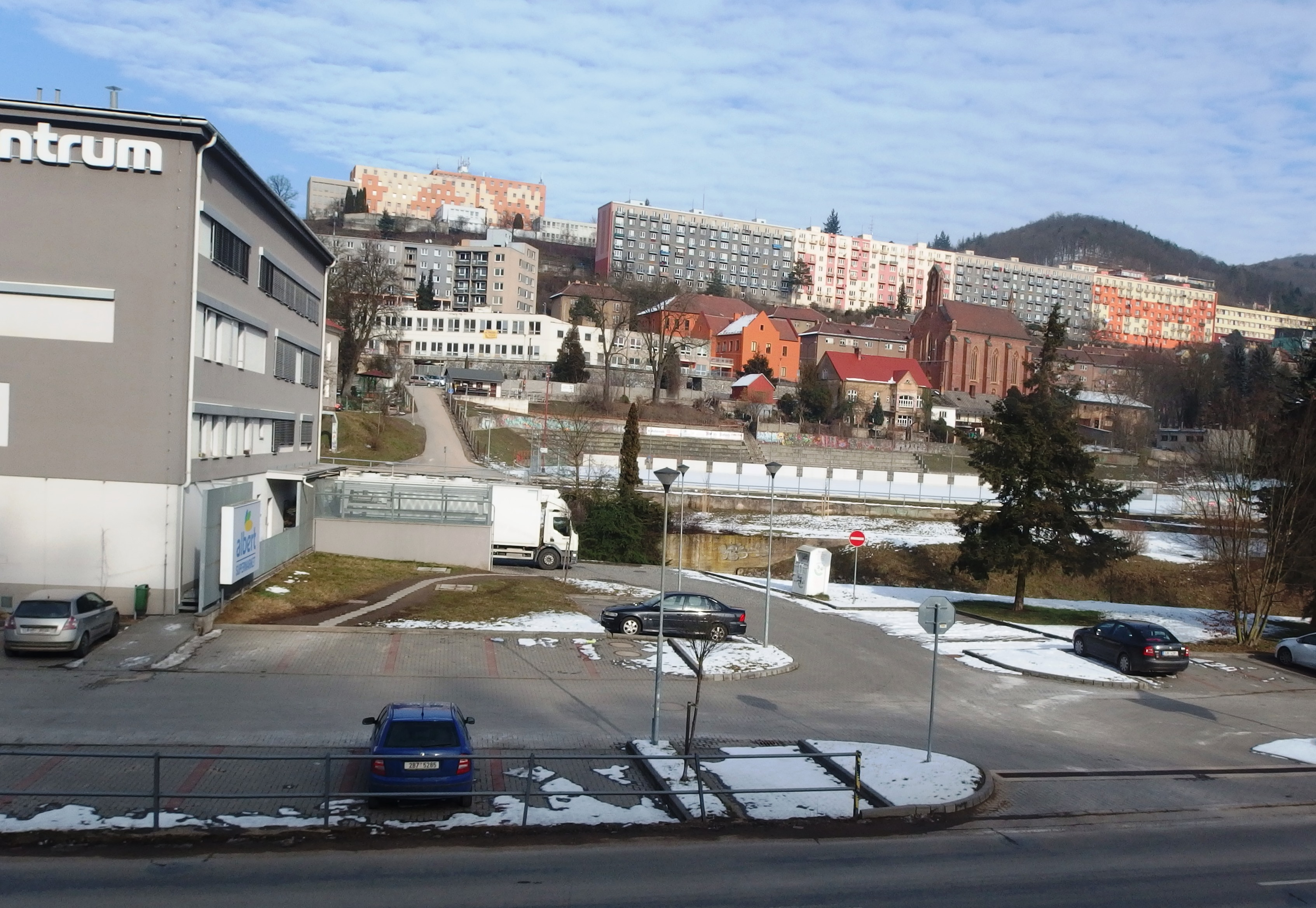
Centre of Adamov

From 1952, the local company was named Adamovské strojírny ('Adamov engineering works') or ADAST. In the 21st century, the company went bankrupt. Its subsidiary, Adast Systems, was founded in 1993. The successor of the company's name is an engineering company focused on the production of fuel dispensers and other technologies for pumping stations. This assortment has been produced in ADAST since the 1960s.

== Transport ==
Adamov is located on the railway line Brno–Letovice.

== Sights ==
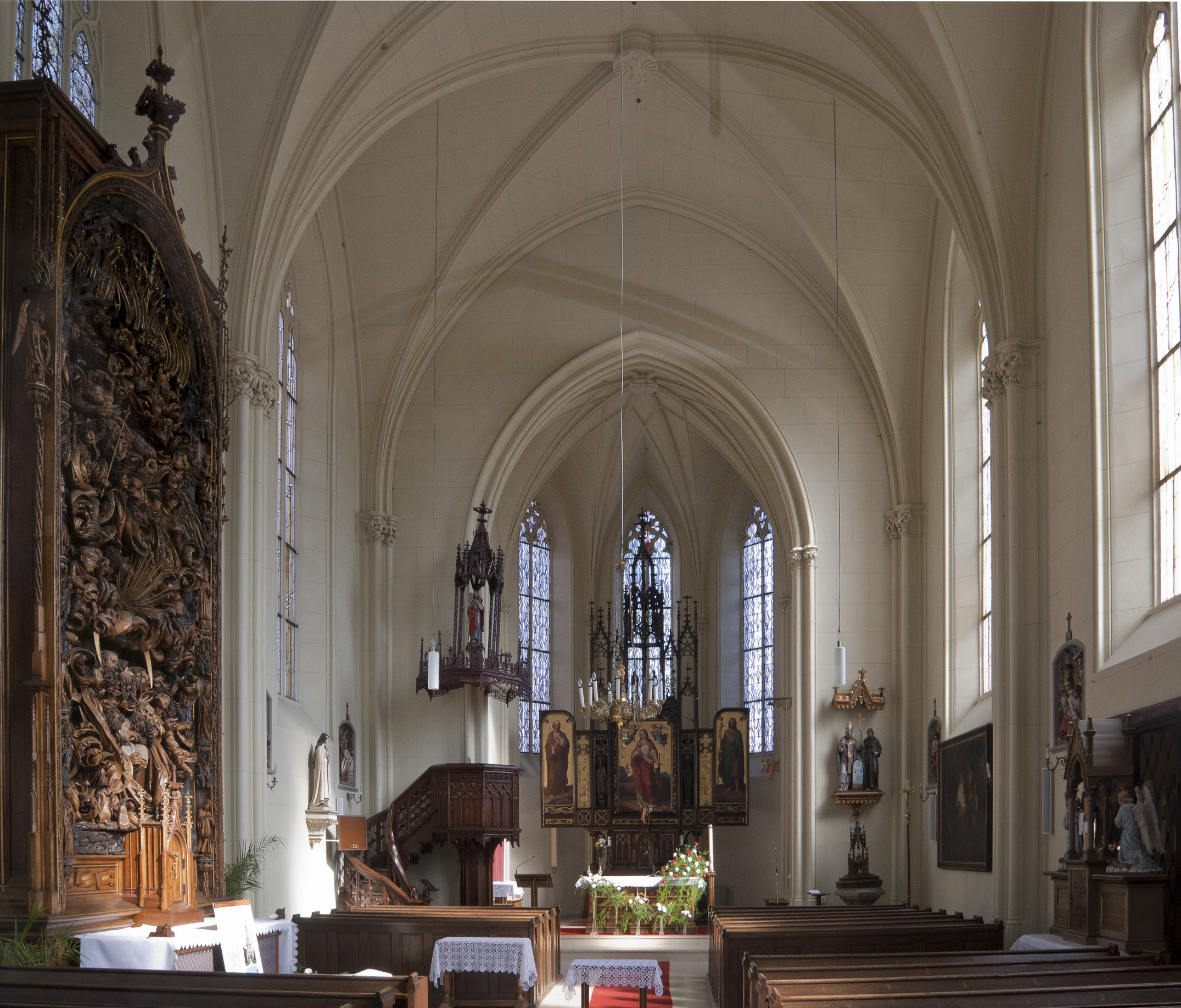
Interior of the Church of Saint Barbara with the Zwettl Altar in the left

The Church of Saint Barbara was built in the neo-Gothic style in 1855–1857. It contains a valuable late Gothic altarpiece called the Zwettl Altar (Světelský oltář). It comes from the Zwettl Abbey and was created in 1516–1525. The wooden altar illustrates the Assumption of the Virgin Mary and comprises 59 carved figures.

== Notable people ==
- Johann Victor Krämer (1861–1949), Austrian painter
- Zdeněk Kroupa (1921–1999), opera singer
- Jindřich Svoboda (born 1952), footballer
