= Esperanto Museum in Svitavy =

- Muzeum esperanta ve Svitavách
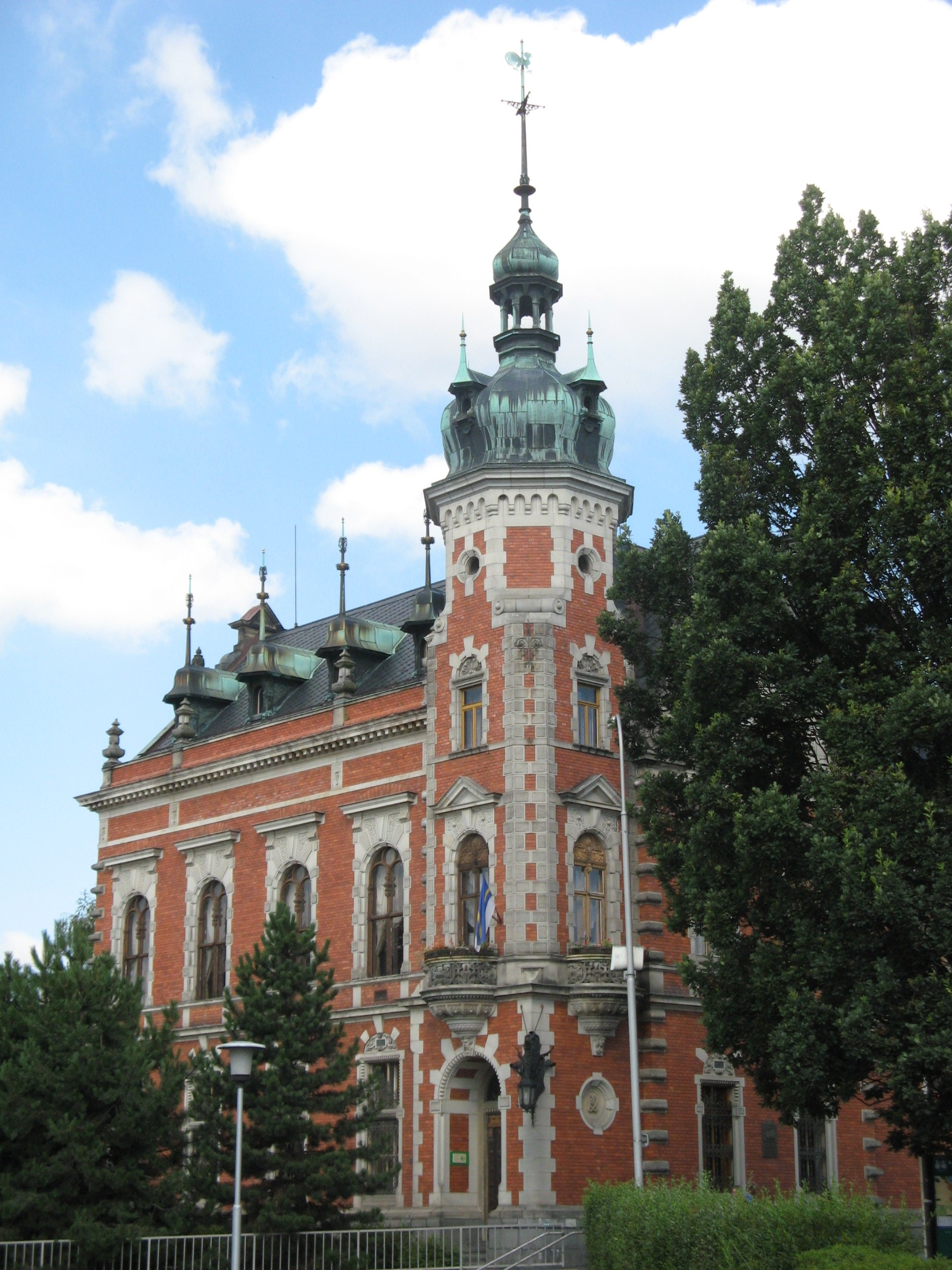
- Ottendorfer House, location of the museum
- Interactive fullscreen map
- Established: 2008; 18 years ago
- Location: náměstí Míru 81, Svitavy, Czech Republic, 568 02
- Coordinates: 49°45′16.88″N 16°28′21.41″E
- Website: http://muzeum.esperanto.cz/cs/

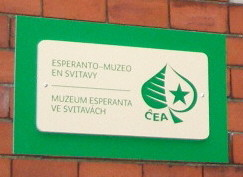
Board at the entrance

Esperanto Museum in Svitavy (Czech: Muzeum esperanta ve Svitavách) is a museum in Svitavy in the Czech Republic. It presents the history and current activity of the Esperanto movement. It was inaugurated in September 2008.

== Museum building ==
The museum is located in the Ottendorfer House, which was built in 1892 by an American patron and local native Oswald Ottendorfer. The architect Germano Wanderley designed the house, while the town's mayor Friedrich Sander entrusted the construction of the building to Johann Bier. The house is also known as "The Red Library", because its walls have a red brick color.

=== Original purpose of the house ===
The house also hosts a public library with 7,400 German books, which later expanded into a collection of 22,000 volumes. At the time, the town was mostly inhabited by German speakers. From time to time, concerts, plays and lectures take place in the forum on the upper floor.

The book collection is considered to be superb, since Ottendorfer wanted to make good quality literature accessible to a wider public. He hoped other cities would follow his model. He then decided to catalog the collection according to the Dewey Decimal System.

During World War II, many books were stolen, then more during the communist period, until there were only 6,000 volumes left. Those are now conserved in the Town Museum of Svitavy.

== History ==
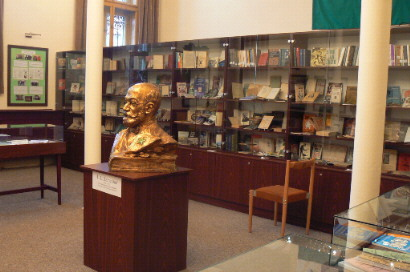
Museum main exhibition room

There was an empty room on the ground floor of the Ottendorfer House, which always belonged to the museum. Local Esperanto speakers proposed to the director of the museum and the mayor to create an exposition about the history of the Esperanto movement. They were both enthusiastic about the idea. They not only reached an agreement with the ministry of culture, but also received financial support to repair and equip the room with the necessary furnishings. Much of the work was done by the local Esperanto community, who were also assisted by the Czech Esperanto Association as well as others from abroad. The town museum borrowed Zamenhof's bust and many books from nearby Česká Třebová, which has the largest collection of Esperanto books in the Czech Republic. But there, the books are stored in an archive away from the public due to scientific needs, while in Svitavy they are exhibited for the general public.

== Museum layout ==
Esperanto books are displayed in seven glass displays, sorted by the topic of the individual exhibitions. The museum also displays current books, which can be purchased. Behind the displays is a closed space with bookshelves of Esperanto books. Other exhibits can be seen on the five glass-covered tables, along with 13 frames on the wall concerning different topics of the movement. There is also an exhibit of Esperanto pins, buttons and other small historically significant objects. Visitors can also interact with a touchscreen computer to learn more about specific areas of interest. Nearby is a small collection of magazines and brochures which visitors can take with them for free. The back room of the museum has a small cafe where people can chat.

== Activities ==
In October 2011, the museum hosted the Esperanto Wikimania, an event held on the occasion of the 10th anniversary of the Esperanto Wikipedia.
