= Heidi Lück =

Former German politician

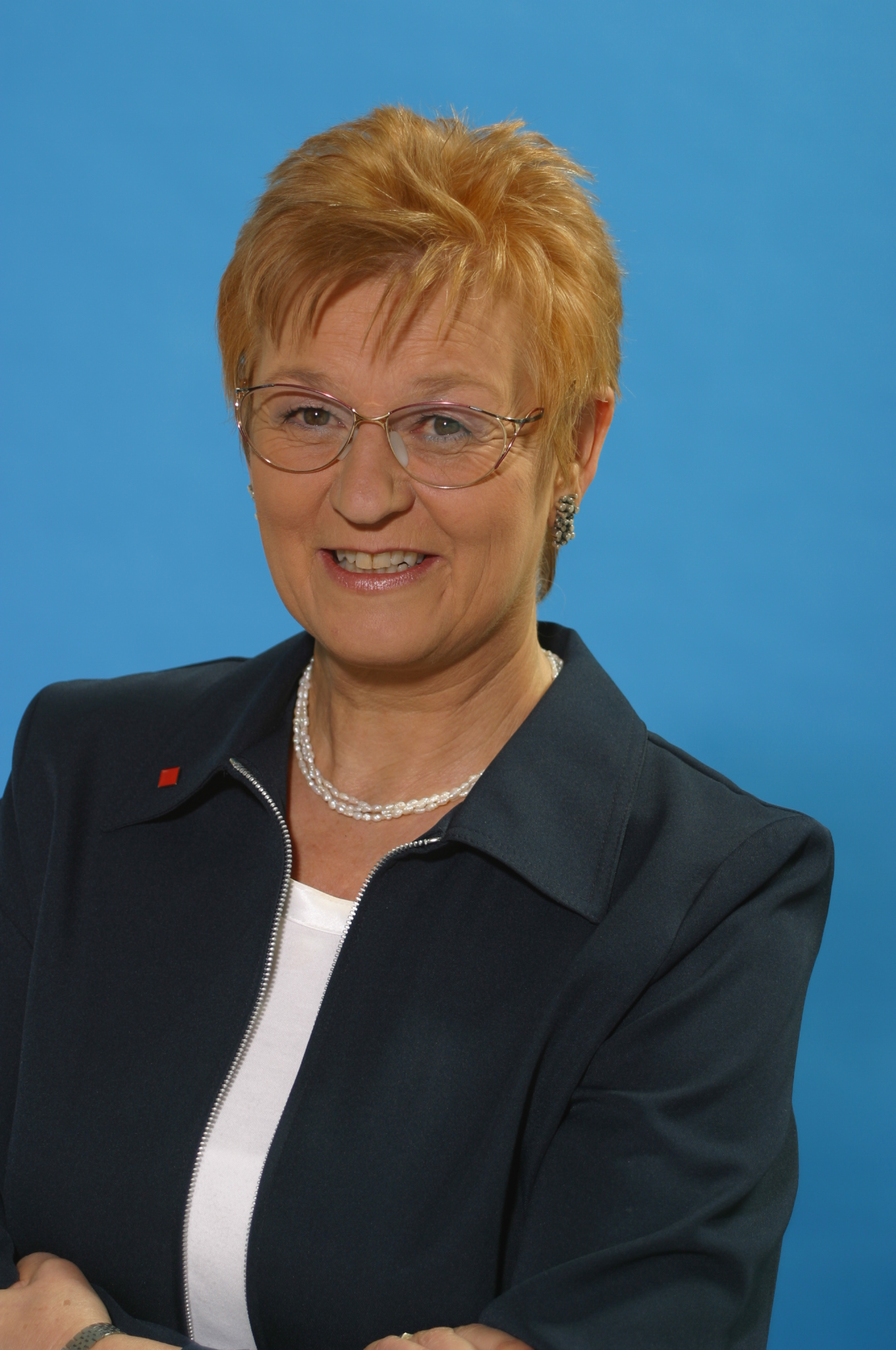
- Lück in 2005

Member of the Landtag of Bavaria
- In office 20 October 1994 – 20 October 2008
- Constituency: Swabia (Sonthofen district)

Personal details
- Born: Heidi Pfeifer; 6 April 1943 (age 83) Strokele, Reichsgau Sudetenland, Nazi-occupied Czechoslovakia
- Party: SPD

Heidi Lück (née Pfeifer) (born 6 April 1943) is a former German politician who was a member of the Landtag of Bavaria (German: Bayerischer Landtag) in the constituency of Swabia from 1994 to 2008.

== Childhood, education and early adult years ==
Lück was born Heidi Pfeifer in Strokele/Zwittau in Bohemia–Moravia (present day Czech Republic). She is a Roman Catholic. At the age of two, she experienced the turmoil surrounding the end of WW2. As a result of the Beneš decrees, Heidi's parents had their property expropriated and Heidi, her mother (Anna Pfeifer), and three siblings (Herbert, Helma and Horst) were resettled in Allmendingen in Baden-Württemberg after being expelled from their hometown of Zwittau in Bohemia (now Svitavy, Czech Republic). Heidi later graduated from school and was trained as a retail saleswoman. Always very involved in sports, at 18 Heidi became the then youngest member of the board (Kreisjugend Turnwart) of the Ehingen sports district in Baden-Württemberg, with responsibility for young people.

After working as a retail saleswoman, she married Willi Lück in 1967 and subsequently moved to Altusried in the Allgäu where she worked for many years with her husband in their own business in the Swabian region - as well as being an active mother. Lück is divorced and has one adult son.

== Career in politics ==
After her divorce and re-entry into professional life in 1978, she worked part-time as an administrator for the SPD and also as an assistant to the MP Günter Wirth (Bavarian state parliament 1970-1994) in Kempten. From 1992 up to the date of her own election to the Bavarian state parliament in 1994, Heidi Lück worked full-time in the political arena and was responsible for the SPD district branches Oberallgäu, Kempten, Lindau (Bodensee), Neu-Ulm and Günzburg.

Heidi Lück has been a member of the Bavarian SPD since 1980 and has been active in almost all party functions. Amongst other activities, she worked for 16 years as district federation chairman for the SPD Oberallgäu until 2005 and as a chairman of the working-group of social democratic women (Arbeitsgemeinschaft sozialdemokratischer Frauen AsF), Swabian district, until 2004. In addition she has been chairman of the AsF subdistrict Oberallgäu up to 2007, and a Delegate to various other branches and districts up to the present time, as well as being SPD subdistrict chairman, a local councillor in Durach/Allgäu and a district councillor in the Oberallgäu up until June 1998.

== Bavarian State Parliament ==
In 1990 Heidi Lück campaigned for a seat in the Bavarian state parliament for the first time and lost by 95 votes.

In 1994 she was a candidate in the parliamentary elections for a second time, and was elected as a member of the Bavarian state parliament (Landtag in the 13th Legislative period) due to the district-list (Landesliste) of the SPD Swabia (proportional representation voting system). She is currently still a member of the parliament, now in the 15th legislative period (in all 3 electoral periods: 1994, 1998 and 2003 (note: starting from 1998, the Bavarian legislative period was increased from 4 to 5 years)

She represents the SPD state parliament group in the committee for agriculture, nutrition and forestry. Heidi Lück is agriculture and forestry spokeswoman and chairwoman of the SPD faction working group "agriculture, nutrition and forestry". As well as being a member of the working groups "women", "youth" and "sport", she is also the official representative of the SPD state parliament faction in the "Bodensee parliamentary commission" and member of the "Socialist Bodensee-International" (SBI) since 1994.

Besides her own electoral constituency, Sonthofen-Lindau, Heidi Lück additionally is responsible for the electoral constituencies Kempten/Oberallgäu, Kaufbeuren and Marktoberdorf/Ostallgäu (Füssen to Buchloe) due to the lack of other delegates in these areas.

== Honorary offices and membership of associations and federations ==
Since 2001, now in her second electoral period, Heidi Lück has been voluntary chairman of the Oberallgäu BRK (Bavarian Red Cross) district federation. She is also a member of the board of the "Foundation for handicapped people in Allgäu" as well as a member of the board of trustees of the University of Applied Sciences, Kempten, likewise she has been a lay associate judge for juveniles (Jugendschöffe) for many years. She is member of the prison advisory board (Gefängnisbeirat) of the correctional facility "JVA Kempten" (Justizvollzugsanstalt) and is active in the volunteer helpers organisation (Straffälligenhilfe).

She has been an active member for many years of the following organisations (and of others, not listed here):

- "Sozialverband VdK Deutschland" (Sozial association VdK Germany) formerly "Verband der Kriegsbeschädigten" (Association of war wounded)
- "Bund für Umwelt und Naturschutz Bayern" (BUND, Environmental and nature conservation association)
- "Arbeiterwohlfahrt AWO" (Labor welfare association)
- "Gewerkschaft Handel, Banken und Versicherungen HBV" (Labor union for commerce, banking and insurance)
- "Verkehrswacht" (Organization for promoting road safety)
- "Naturfreunde" (Association for friends of nature)
- Schützenverein (Marksman's' federation)
- "Kleingartenverein" (Allotment association)
- Founder member of the cabaret association "Klein Kunstverein Klecks", organizers of the international big event "Kemptener Jazz Frühling" (Kempten jazz in the spring) with up to 350 artists from 70 nations
- "Bayerische Akademie ländlicher Raum" (Bavarian academy for rural areas)
- "Allgäuer Hilfsfonds" (Allgäu aid fund)
- "Holzforum Allgäu" (Allgäu wood forum)

== Honors ==
On October 7, 2005 Heidi Lück was decorated with the "Protektor insignia" by the Bavarian sports marksman's' federation (Bayerischer Sportschützenbund), under the patronage of His Royal Highness Duke Franz of Bavaria, in "appreciation of services concerned with the promotion of shooting sports in Bavaria" (Würdigung der Verdienste um das Bayerische Schützenwesen), a very great honor.

On July 5, 2006 Heidi Lück was decorated by the Bavarian Prime Minister (Ministerpräsident Edmund Stoiber) as "an indication of honor and grateful acknowledgment of outstanding services to the Free State of Bavaria and the Bavarian people" with the Bavarian service medal (Bayerischer Verdienstorden), the highest honor of the Free State of Bavaria.
