= Hermann Edler von Zeissl =

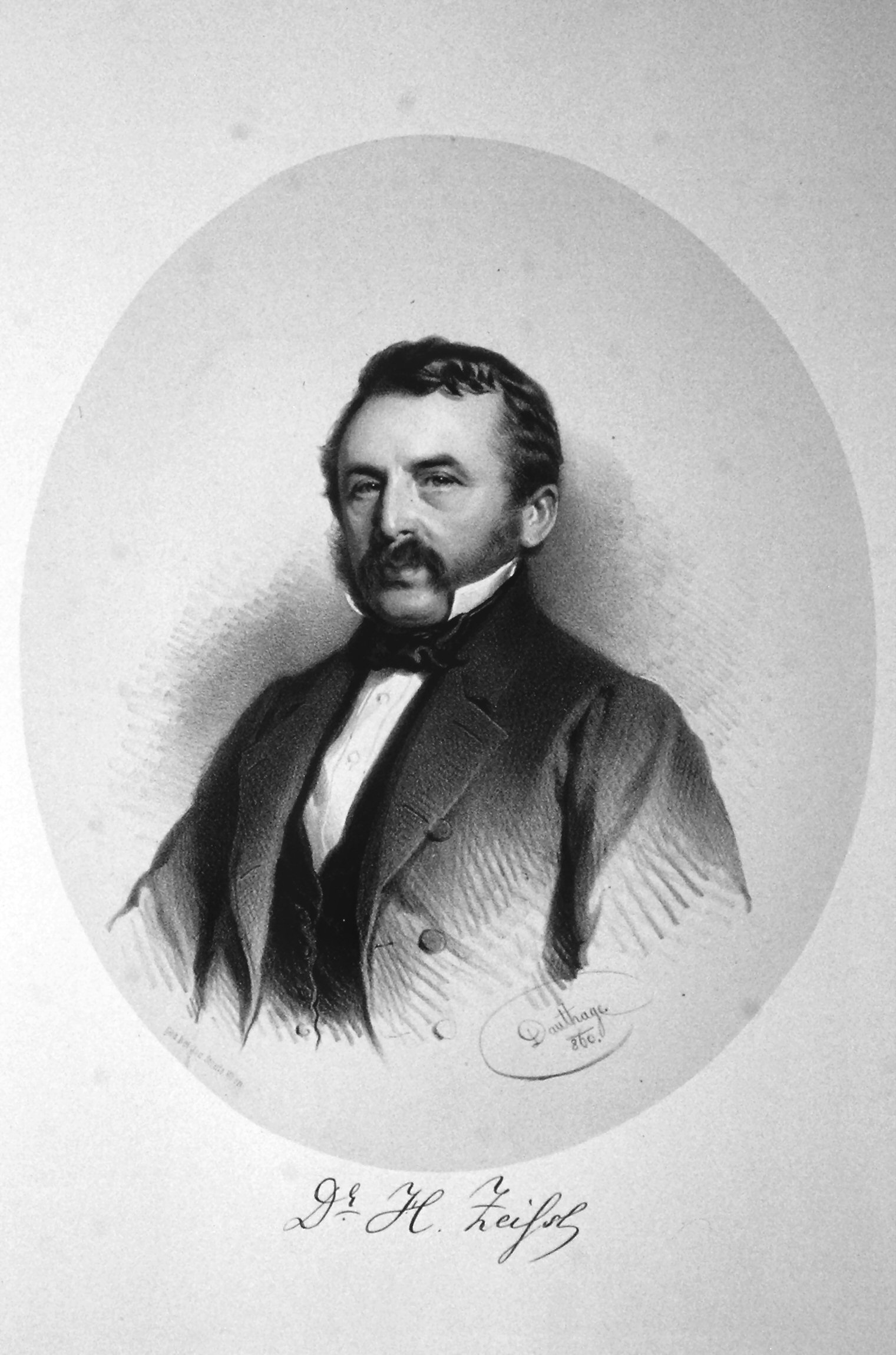
Hermann Edler von Zeissl.

Hermann Edler von Zeissl (22 September 1817 – 23 September 1884) was a Moravia-born Austrian Jewish dermatologist who was born in the village of Vierzighuben (Czech: Čtyřicet Lánů, Svitavy-Lány), near Zwittau, Moravia.

Zeissl received his medical doctorate from the University of Vienna, and from 1846 worked as a medical assistant in the surgical and dermatological hospitals at the university. In 1861 he became an associate professor in Vienna, and in 1869 was appointed professor and chief physician of the second department for syphilis at General Hospital Vienna. During his career, he was an authority on skin diseases and syphilis.

== Written works ==
- Compendium der Pathologie und Therapie der primär-syphilitischen und einfach venerischen Krankheiten (Wien, 1850).
- Lehrbuch der constitutionellen Syphilis für Aerzte und Hörer der Medicin (Erlangen, 1864).
  - 2nd edition, revised and enlarged: Lehrbuch der Syphilis und der mit dieser verwandten örtlichen venerischen Krankheiten (2 volumes, Erlangen 1871/72).
- Grundriss der Pathologie und Therapie der Syphilis (1876) – translated into English and published in 1886 as: Outlines of the Pathology and Treatment of Syphilis and Allied Venereal Diseases.
