= Johann Victor Krämer =

Austrian painter and photographer

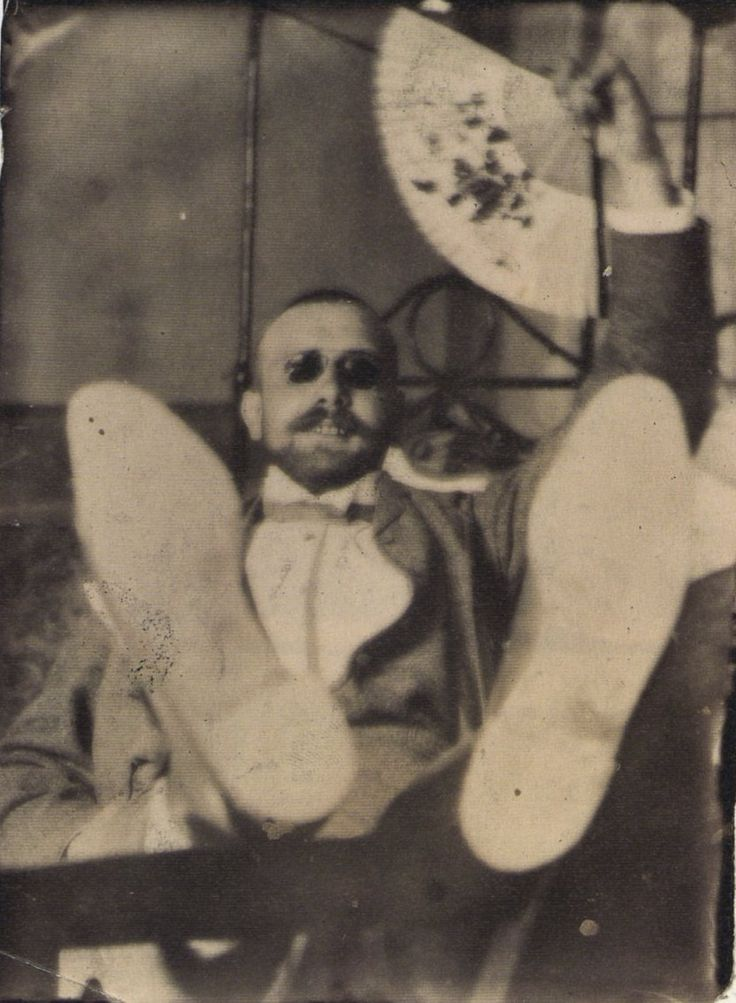
- Johann Victor Krämer, self-portrait with Vienna fan
- Born: 23 August 1861; Adamsthal, Moravia, Austria-Hungary
- Died: 6 May 1949 (aged 87); Vienna, Austria
- Education: Kunstgewerbeschule (School of Applied Arts), Vienna (1878 to 1881); Allgemeine Malerschule, Academy of Fine Arts, Vienna (1881 to 1883)
- Known for: Orientalist painting and photography
- Spouse: Emilie Franziska Bohlinger
- Patrons: Leopoldine Wittgenstein

Johann Victor Krämer (23 August 1861 in Adamsthal – 6 May 1949 in Vienna) was an Austrian painter and photographer, working generally within the Orientalist genre. He was a founding member of the Vienna Secession, and received many awards through his life.

== Life and career ==
Krämer, born on August 23, 1861, in Adamsthal (near Brno / Mähborn), was the son of Alwin Krämer, a mechanical engineer from Dresden employed at a factory in Adamsthal belonging for Johann II, Prince of Liechtenstein. He received a scholarship from the Prince, who was to remain his patron until the 1920s, and studied at the Kunstgewerbeschule (School of Applied Arts) in Vienna from 1878 to 1881. Gustav Klimt and Franz Matsch were among his classmates.

He attended the General School of Painting (Allgemeine Malerschule) of the Academy of Fine Arts, Vienna from 1881 to 1883, then from 1883 to 1888, he was a student of the Austrian historical and Oriental painter Leopold Carl Müller at the Special School for Historical Painting (Spezialschule für Historienmalerei). Krämer received the Rome Prize in 1888 for his depiction of the judgment of Paris; with the accompanying travel scholarship, he visited Paris, London, Madrid, Tangiers (with Hermann Bahr and Gyula Tomai) and Italy from 1888 to 1890.

He moved to a Vienna studio in 1891, which he would keep until his death, and in 1892 joined the Old World, a club of visual artists. He worked for commissions in this period, and spent time as an art tutor to the family of the industrialist Karl Wittgenstein. He joined the Vienna Künstlerhaus in 1893, and was a founding member of the Vienna Secession in 1897 when he left it. His work was exhibited at the Second Exhibition of the Secession.

With patronage from Leopoldine Wittgenstein, he spent 1898–1900 travelling in Egypt and Palestine, reaching as far as Abu Simbel and Baalbek. With a Kodak camera, he took many photographs, which are now part of the Albertina museum's collections. In 1901, the 11th exhibition of the Secession was entirely made up of his work, including the start of a book recording s journey to Egypt and Palestine. Also in 1901, he had a number of his works featured in the Secession's magazine, Ver Sacrum. He followed an active exhibition schedule, including in Munich, Berlin, Prague (1902), Graz (1904) and Linz (1910).

At the age of 49 he married Emilie Franziska Bohlinger in Vienna on 1 January 1911, and together they had a daughter Maria and sons Hans and Gustav. Krämer remained artistically active in his old age, but he did not remain in the avant-garde, particularly after 1900;. He introduced more religious themes into his work as he aged. Having rejoined the Künstlerhaus in 1939, he exhibited collectively there in 1941 at the age of 80.

He died in Vienna on 6 May 1949, leaving behind a large body of work, including paintings in oil, watercolour, gouache and pastel, as well as many drawings and photographs and much correspondence. He enjoyed a significant reputation in his early life, but gradually faded to obscurity. Since 1980, there has been an increased interest in 19th century Orientalist painting and in his life and work.

== Awards ==
- Gundel Prize, 1883.
- Special School Award, 1894; for general services.
- Reichel Artist Prize, 1887; for "Descent from the Cross".
- Rome Prize, 1888; for his depiction of the judgment of Paris.
- Archduke Carl Ludwig Medal, 1896; for the picture "Dolce for niente".
- Gold Medal of the Künstlerhaus, 1895; for "Monstery by the Sea".
- Silver Medal at the 1900 World's Fair, Paris.
- Silver Medal at the 1910 World's Fair, Buenos Aires; for "Christ with Mary and Martha".
- Professor of the Academy of Fine Arts, 1917; 125th anniversary of the academy.
- Honorary award from the city of Vienna, 1925; for "Jerusalem".
- State award, 1926; for "Flight into Egypt".
- Golden Laurel of the Vienna Künstlerhaus, 1946.

== See also ==
- Orientalism
- List of Orientalist artists
- Oriental studies
