= Karl Kořistka =

Czech geographer, cartographer, mathematician and professor

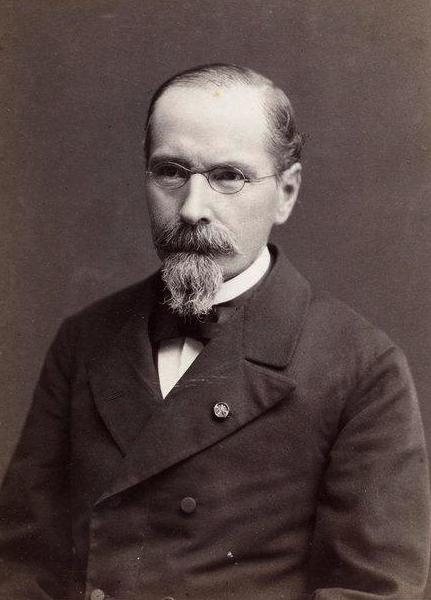
- Kořistka in 1881
- Born: 7 February 1825; Březová nad Svitavou, Moravia, Austrian Empire
- Died: 18 January 1906 (aged 80); Prague, Bohemia, Austria-Hungary
- Other names: Karel Kořistka, Carl Kořistka
- Occupations: geographer, cartographer, mathematician

Karl Kořistka (also Carl Kořistka, Czech: Karel Kořistka; 7 February 1825 – 18 January 1906) was a Czech geographer, cartographer, mathematician and professor.

== Biography ==
Kořistka studied geography and mathematics in Vienna, and at an early age became a student at the school of mining and forestry at Banská Štiavnica. In 1851, he became professor of mathematics and geodesy in the German polytechnical school at Prague. He exerted a wide influence in the development of the technical and professional schools of Austria. He was also much occupied in orographical and hypsometrical studies and explored several of the mountainous regions of Europe, where he obtained a large number of levels and heights.

From 1867 to 1869, he was a representative in the Diet of Bohemia and in the Vienna Reichsrat.

== Works ==
Besides numerous memoirs, mostly written in German and in French, he wrote for many reviews and journals. Among his principal works may be mentioned:

- Studien über die Methoden und die Benutzung hypsometrischer Arbeiten (Studies on the methodology and use of hypsometrical works; Gotha, 1858)
- Die Markgrafschaft Mähren und das Herzogtum Schlesien in ihren geographischen Verhältnissen (Vienna, 1860)
- Hypsometrie von Mähren und Schlesien (Brünn, 1863)
- Der höhere polytechnische Unterricht in Deutschland, der Schweiz, in Frankreich, Belgien und England (Gotha, 1863)
- Die Hohe Tatra (Gotha, 1864)
- Das Mittel- und Sandsteingebirge in Böhmen (Prague, 1869)
- Das Iser- und Riesengebirge (Prague, 1877)
- Verzeichniss der trigonometrischen Höhen von Böhmen (Prague, 1884).
