= Skrchov =

- Municipality
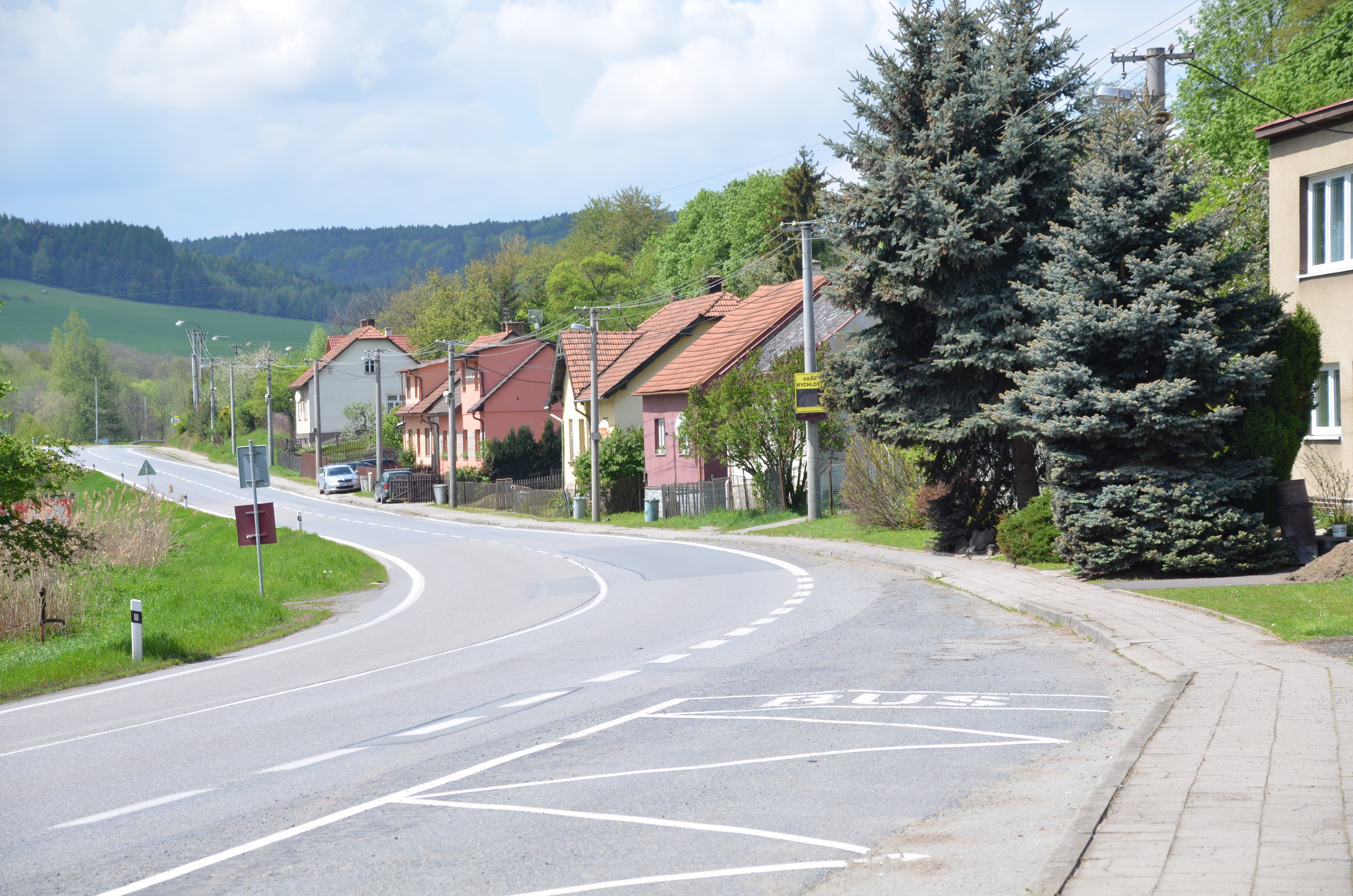
- Main road

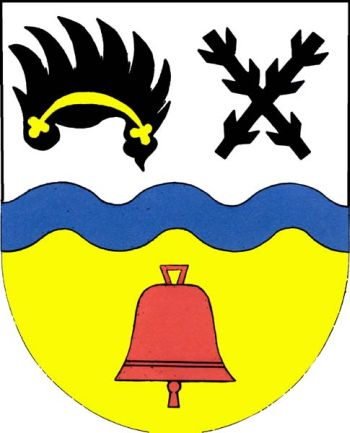
- Flag Coat of arms

- Location in the Czech Republic
- Coordinates: 49°34′40″N 16°32′58″E
- Country: Czech Republic
- Region: South Moravian
- District: Blansko
- First mentioned: 1406

Area
  - Total: 2.12 km^{2} (0.82 sq mi)
- Elevation: 343 m (1,125 ft)

Population (2026-01-01)
  - Total: 122
  - Density: 57.5/km^{2} (149/sq mi)
- Time zone: UTC+1 (CET)
  - Summer (DST): UTC+2 (CEST)
- Postal code: 679 61
- Website: www.obec-skrchov.eu

Skrchov is a municipality and village in Blansko District in the South Moravian Region of the Czech Republic. It has about 100 inhabitants.

Skrchov lies approximately 25 kilometres (16 mi) north of Blansko, 43 km (27 mi) north of Brno, and 163 km (101 mi) east of Prague.

== Demographics ==
Historical population
Year	Pop.	±%
1869	249	—
1880	208	−16.5%
1890	235	+13.0%
1900	288	+22.6%
1910	288	+0.0%
1921	283	−1.7%
1930	262	−7.4%
1950	211	−19.5%
1961	233	+10.4%
1970	144	−38.2%
1980	131	−9.0%
1991	127	−3.1%
2001	102	−19.7%
2011	99	−2.9%
2021	116	+17.2%
Source: Censuses
