= Svitavy =

Town in the Czech Republic

- Town
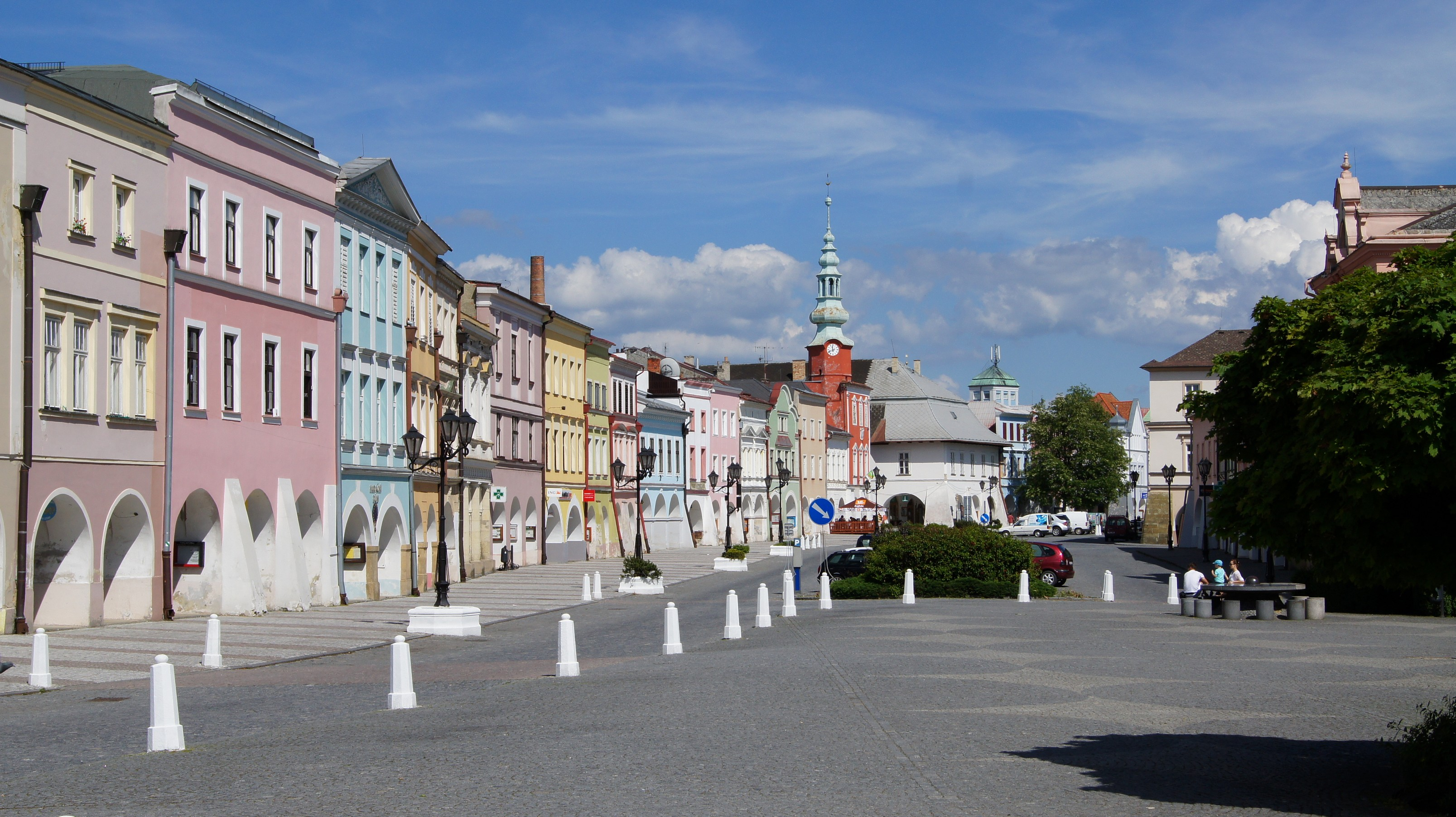
- The square Náměstí Míru

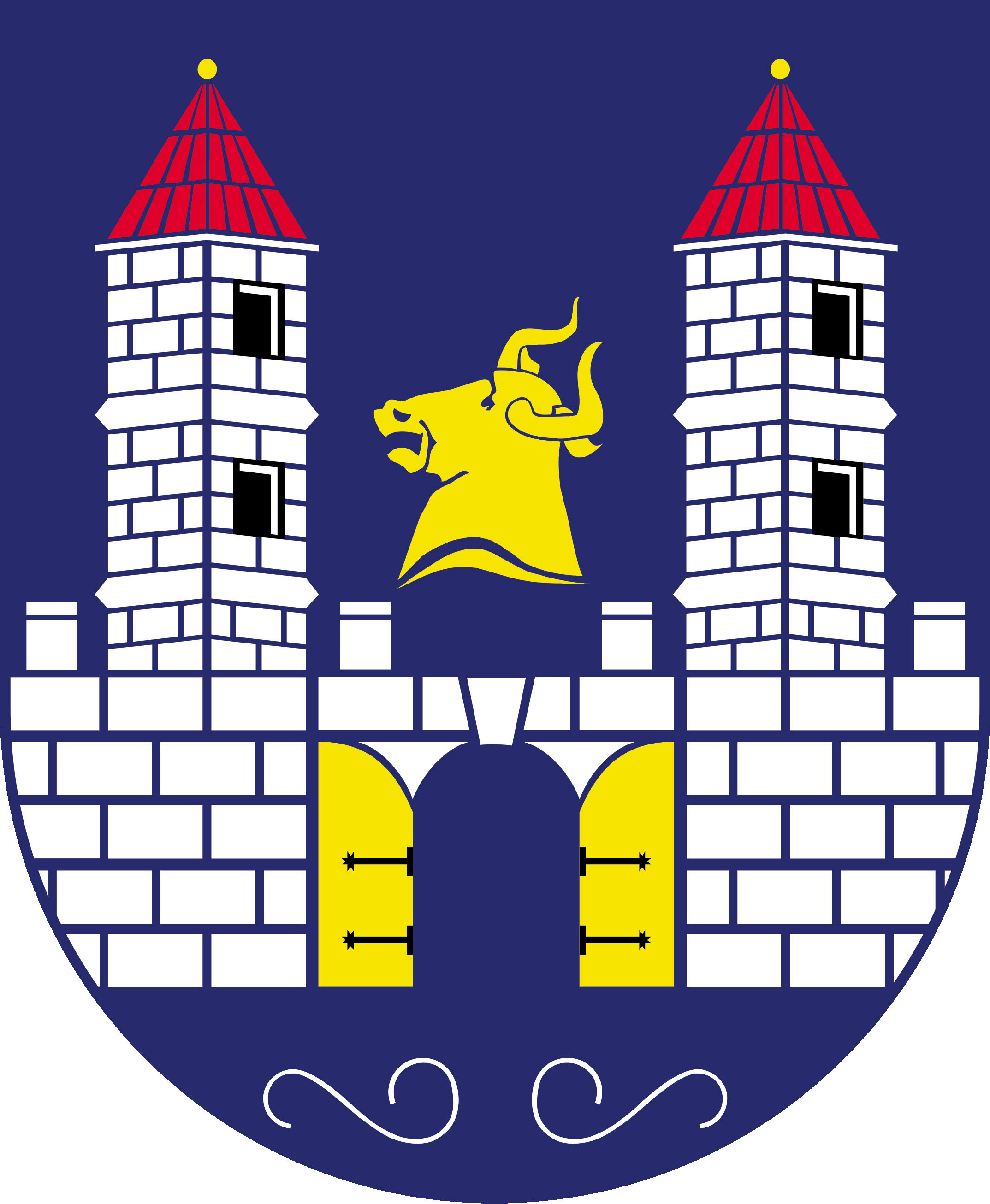
- Flag Coat of arms

- Location in the Czech Republic
- Coordinates: 49°45′20″N 16°28′10″E
- Country: Czech Republic
- Region: Pardubice
- District: Svitavy
- First mentioned: 1256

Government
  - Mayor: David Šimek

Area
  - Total: 31.33 km^{2} (12.10 sq mi)
- Elevation: 435 m (1,427 ft)

Population (2026-01-01)
  - Total: 16,041
  - Density: 512.0/km^{2} (1,326/sq mi)
- Time zone: UTC+1 (CET)
  - Summer (DST): UTC+2 (CEST)
- Postal code: 568 02
- Website: www.svitavy.cz

Svitavy (Czech pronunciation: [ˈsvɪtavɪ]; German: Zwittau) is a town in Svitavy District in the Pardubice Region of the Czech Republic. It has about 16,000 inhabitants. The town is located on the Svitava River in the Svitavy Uplands.

Svitavy is known as the birthplace of Oskar Schindler and the centre of the Czech Esperanto movement. The historic town centre is well preserved and is protected as an urban monument zone.

== Administrative division ==
Svitavy consists of four municipal parts (in brackets population according to the 2021 census):

- Lačnov (1,027)
- Lány (5,803)
- Město (518)
- Předměstí (8,894)

== Etymology ==
Svitavy was named after the river Svitava. The river's name referred to its clear water and was derived from svítat, which meant 'be clear' in Old Czech.

== Geography ==
Svitavy is located about 57 kilometres (35 mi) southeast of Pardubice and 60 km (37 mi) north of Brno. It lies in the Svitavy Uplands. The highest point is at 475 m (1,558 ft) above sea level.

The Svitava River originates in the municipal territory and then flows through the town proper. Apart from a few small bodies of water, there are two significant fishponds on the Svitava near the town: Svitavský rybník and Rosnička. They are the remains of the original eleven water works around the town. Rosnička was founded in the first half of the 16th century and Svitavský rybník was established in 1953. In addition to fish farming, they form a suburban recreational area.

== History ==
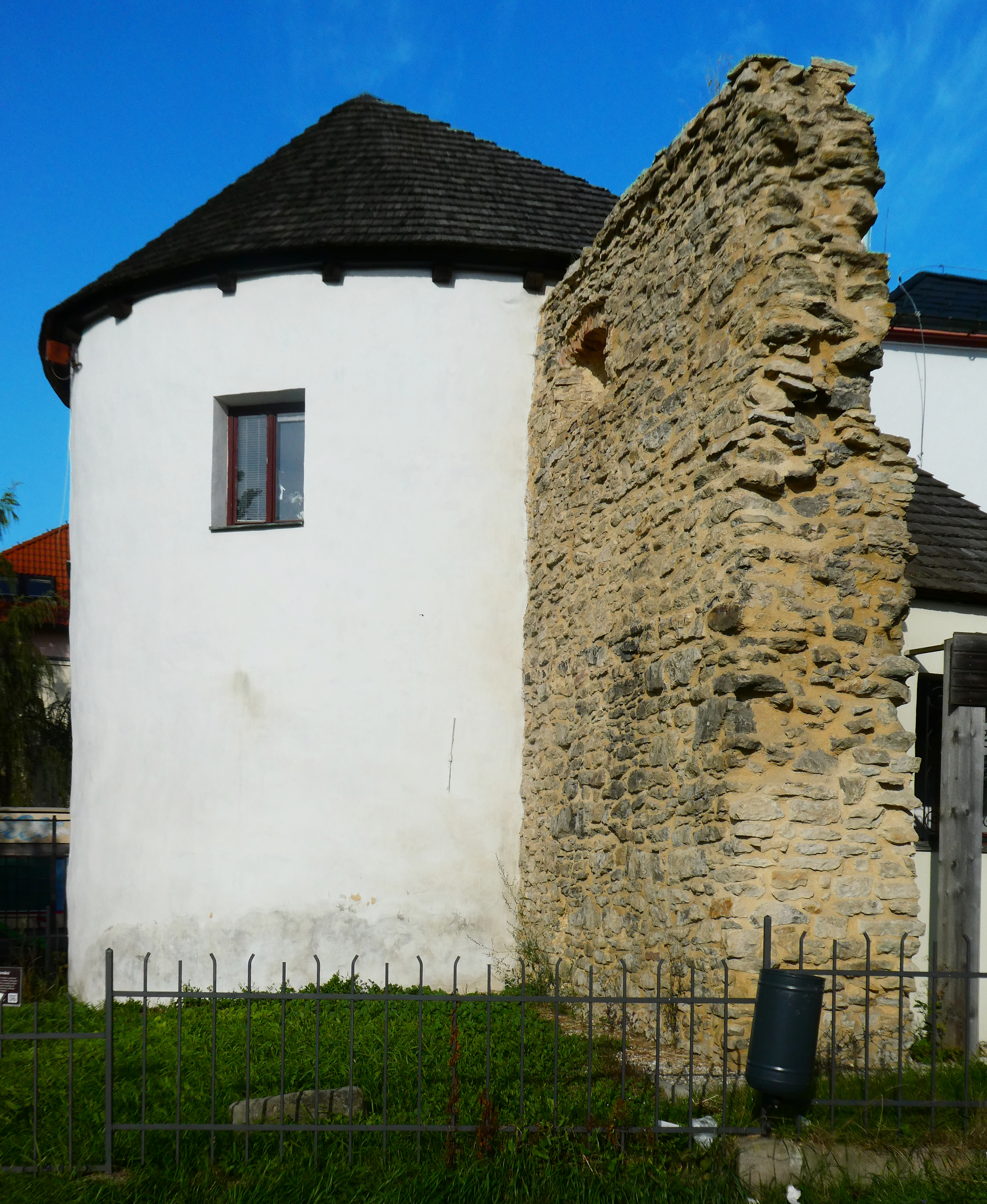
Last remnant of the town fortification

Svitavy was founded during the colonisation by Premonstratensian monks from nearby Litomyšl around 1150. They built the Church of Saint Giles and founded a settlement called Stará Svitava near an old trade route. During the second wave of colonisation in around 1250, mostly German-speaking settlers came and founded another settlement called Nová Svitava. Svitavy was first mentioned in 1256 when it was taken over by the bishop of Olomouc, Bruno von Schauenburg, and this year is considered to be the year of foundation of the town.

In 1389, the town walls were built. They protected the town during the Hussite Wars, however the town was conquered. Svitavy often changed owners. In the 16th century, the town flourished economically. The prosperity was interrupted by the Thirty Years' War. In 1645, the town was looted. In 1781, a large fire destroyed most of the town. During the Napoleonic and Austro-Prussian wars, the town suffered as armies passed through the town.

In 1849, the railway was built, which contributed to the development of the town, especially the textile industry. Gradually, over a hundred textile factories were established. Svitavy has retained its industrial character to this day, although the structure has changed significantly.

Svitavy was historically a German-speaking town with a Czech minority. At the beginning of the 20th century the town saw tensions between ethnic Czechs and Germans. In October 1938, the town was annexed by Nazi Germany and administered as part of the Reichsgau Sudetenland. After the end of World War II in 1945, the German population was expelled as a result of the Beneš decrees. After 1945, the town was resettled by immigrants from the whole Czechoslovakia.

== Demographics ==
Historical population

Year	Pop.	±%
1869	8,670	—
1880	9,654	+11.3%
1890	11,653	+20.7%
1900	13,637	+17.0%
1910	14,820	+8.7%

Year	Pop.	±%
1921	13,892	−6.3%
1930	15,031	+8.2%
1950	12,828	−14.7%
1961	13,878	+8.2%
1970	14,282	+2.9%

Year	Pop.	±%
1980	16,297	+14.1%
1991	17,441	+7.0%
2001	17,626	+1.1%
2011	16,670	−5.4%
2021	16,242	−2.6%

Source: Censuses

== Economy ==
There are no major companies based in the town, only middle-sized employers. The largest employers in Svitavy with more than 250 employees are Fibertex Nonwovens (manufacturer and processor of industrial textiles) and Westrock Packaging Systems Svitavy (producer of cardboard packaging).

== Transport ==
Svitavy is a transport hub of the area. It is well-connected by rail to other parts of the Czech Republic as it is located on the Prague–Brno railway line. It also lies on a line of local importance to Skuteč.

The town has an intercity bus station with services to various destinations. Two first class roads cross just north of Svitavy: the I/43 road (part of the European route E461), which connects the town with Brno, and the I/35 road (part of the European route E442), which replaces the unfinished section of the D35 motorway from Olomouc to the Hradec Králové Region.

== Culture ==
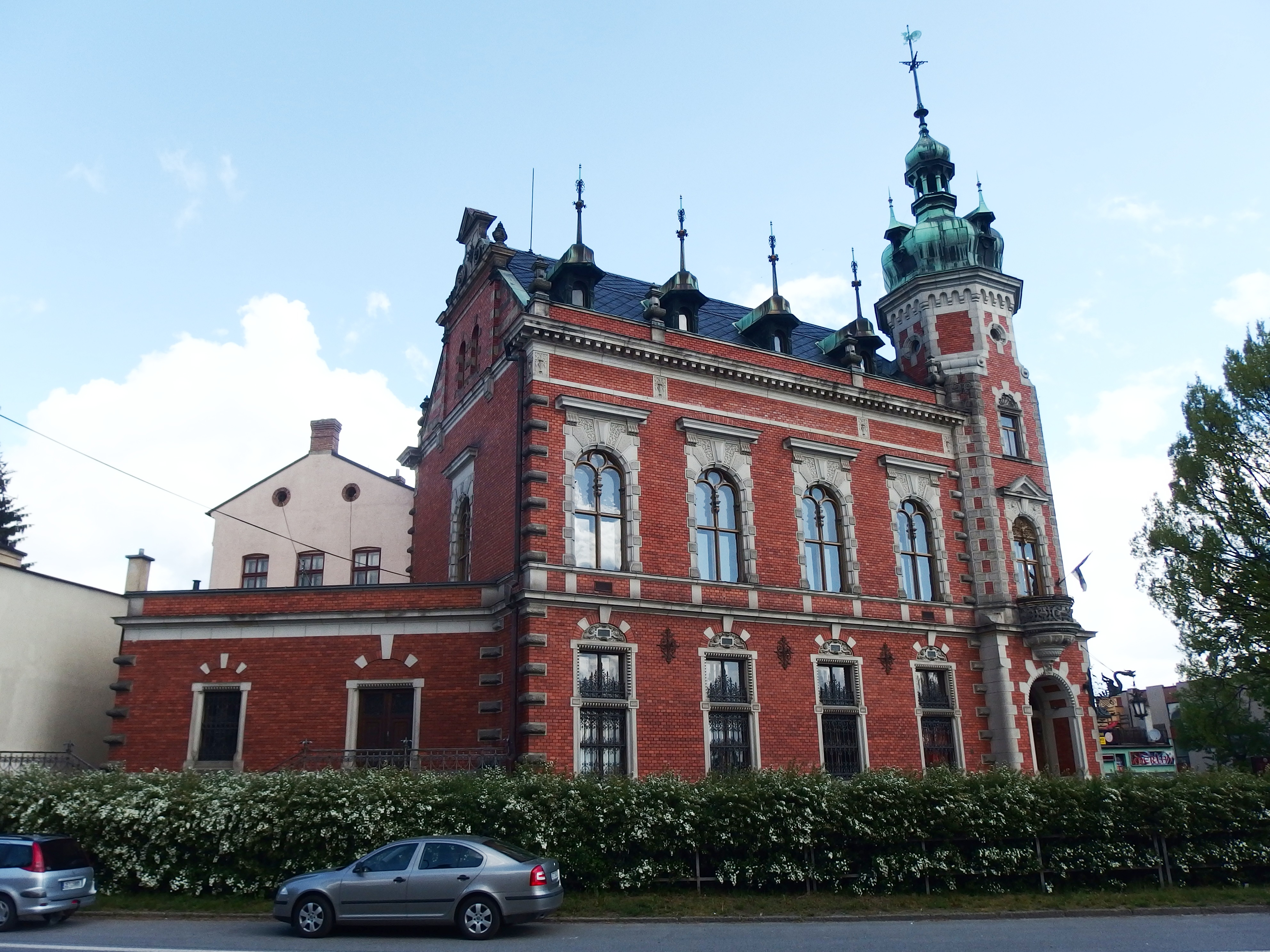
Ottendorfer House with the Esperanto Museum

The Czech Esperanto Association is based in the town. It is a follower of several clubs from the first half of the 20th century, re-established in 1969. It co-organises regional Esperanto meetings, organises Children's Days, and manages the Esperanto Museum in Svitavy.

Since 2011, Svitavy hosts the annual music festival Rosnička.

The Town Museum and Art Gallery was founded in 1894 and it is based in its current premises since 1947. It includes permanent exhibition "From the History of Washing Technology" and an exhibition about the life of local native Oskar Schindler.

The multifunctional cultural centre Fabrika was created by reconstruction of a former textile factory from 1926. It is a social centre with a theatre hall and a library.

== Sport ==
Svitavy is known for the basketball club Tuři Svitavy. Until the relegation in 2024, it played in the National Basketball League (top Czech league).

The stadium Svitavský stadion hosts football and athletics. The town is home to the football club TJ Svitavy, which plays in lower amateur tiers.

Motorcycle speedway is held in the western outskirts of the town at the Areál Chihelna Svitavy. The stadium held a final round of the Czechoslovak Individual Speedway Championship from 1967 to 1973 and continues to hold qualifying races for the event.

== Sights ==
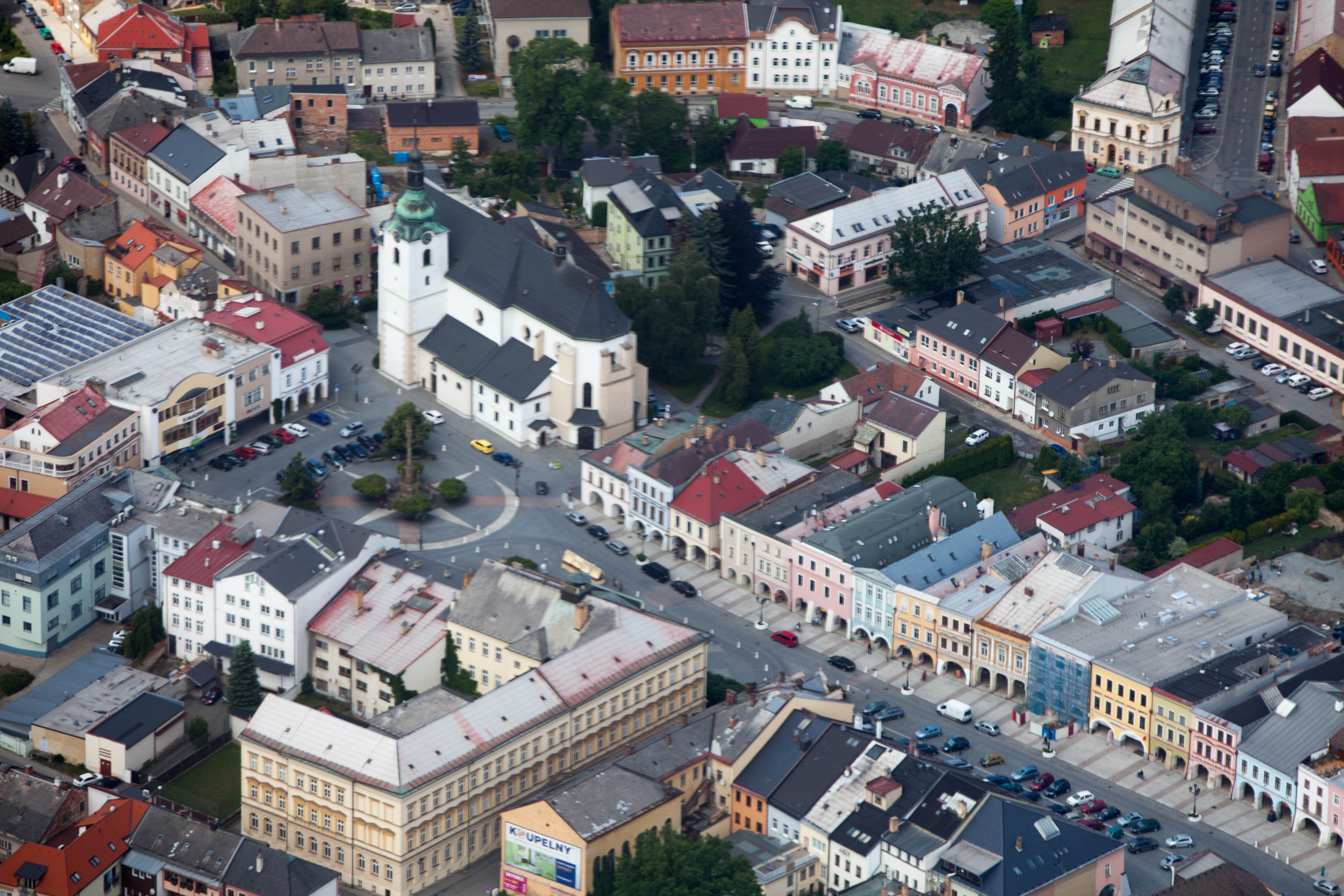
Aerial view of the historic centre

Svitavy has a valuable historic core. Its centre includes the almost 500 metres (1,600 ft) long main square with architecturally noteworthy civic buildings. It is the fourth longest square in the Czech Republic and has the second longest arcade in the country. The Renaissance houses from the 16th century were reconstructed in the Baroque style after the fire in 1781.

In the middle of the square is a Baroque Marian column from 1703. The column is surrounded by the three patron saints of the town – St. Sebastian, St. Florian and St. John of Nepomuk. In the grotto of the column there is a statue of St. Rosalie. On the square there is also the Fountain of St. Florian from 1783.

The town walls from 1389 were demolished during the 19th century. A semi-circular bastion is the only remnant.

=== Civic buildings ===
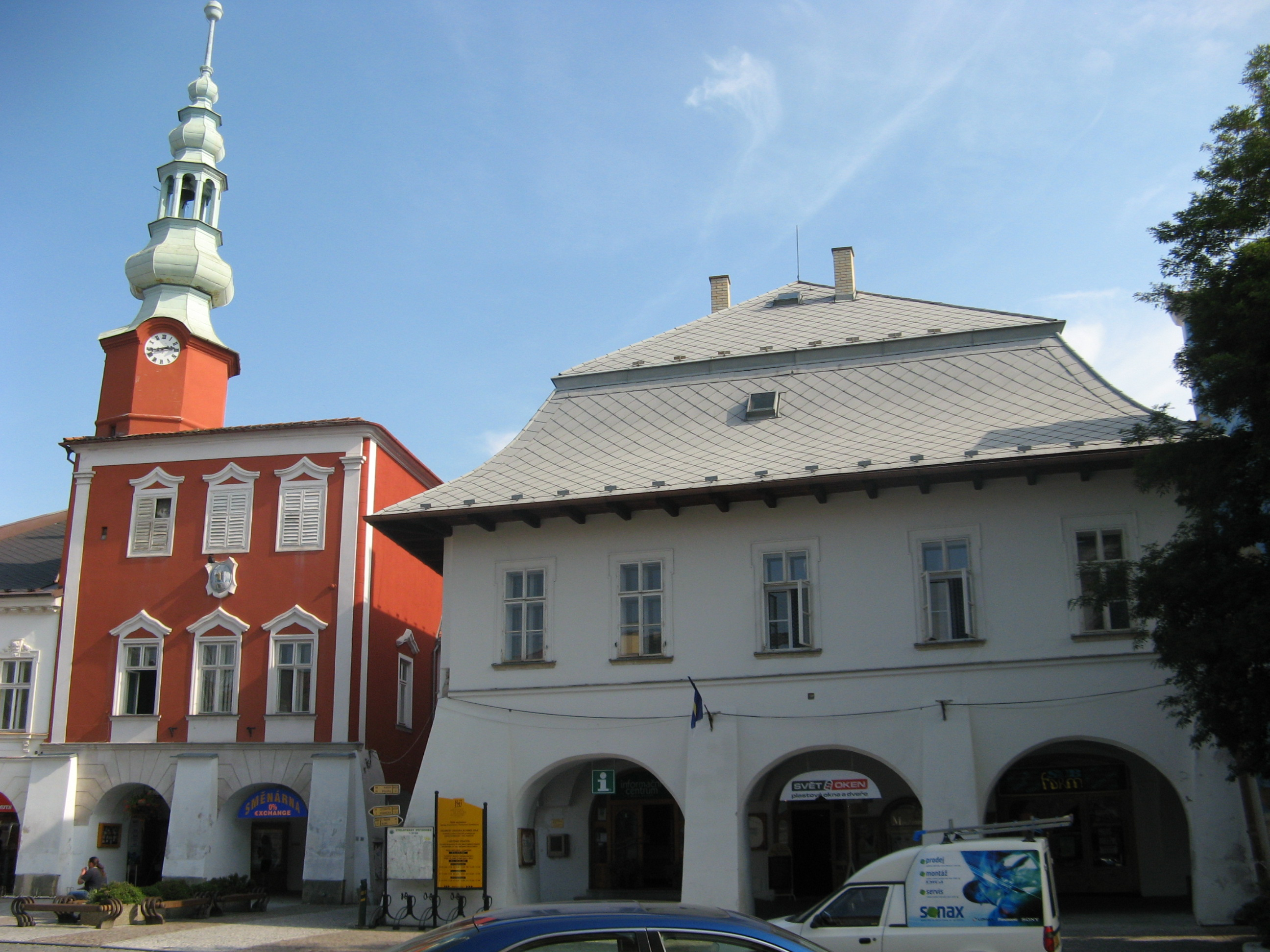
Old Town Hall and "U Mouřenína" House

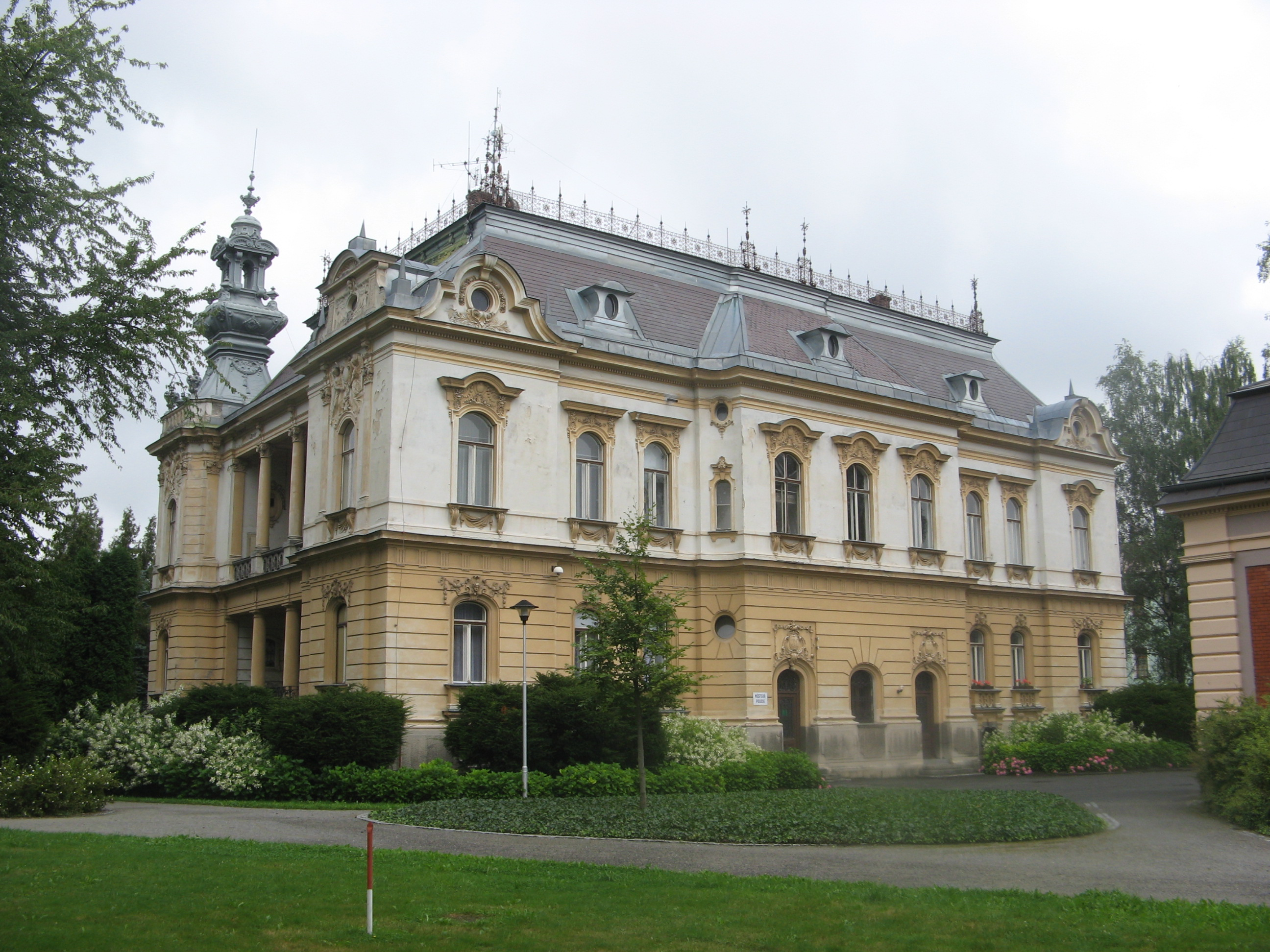
Langer's Villa

Old Town Hall is originally a Renaissance building with a tower, extensively rebuilt after the fire of 1781 and again in 1849. It served as the town hall until 1933 and now it is used for commercial purposes. The adjacent Renaissance "U Mouřenína" House is one of the oldest preserved burgher houses in Svitavy, built in 1554. The tourist information centre is now located in the building.

Ottendorfer House is a red-brick historicist building with a tower, it is one of the symbols of the town, built in 1892 by the local native Oswald Ottendorfer on the site of his birthplace. It originally housed the largest public and most modern German-language library in Moravia, later a town cultural centre. Since 2008 the Esperanto Museum and a tea room are located on the ground floor, the ornate hall on the floor above continues to serve as a concert hall.

Langer's Villa houses the present town hall. It is historicist building with rich stucco ornamentation, built in 1892. It was designed by architect Germano Wanderley, who also designed the Ottendorfer House. The house belonged to one of the richest families in Svitavy, local businesspeople. During the Depression, it was rented out to the town treasury, which in turn in 1933 rented the house to the town authorities, who bought the house and transferred the town hall to it.

Budig's Villa was built in German Renaissance style in 1892 for the former mayor and businessman Johann Budig. Nowadays houses the Town Museum and Gallery.

=== Ecclesiastical buildings ===
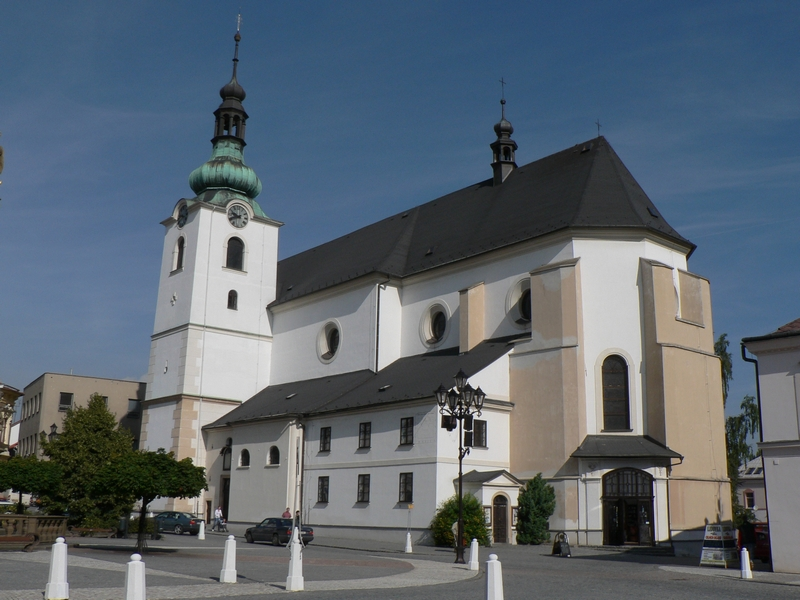
Church of the Visitation of the Virgin Mary

The Church of the Visitation of the Virgin Mary is located on the main square. It was probably originally a Romanesque structure built in around 1250. After the fire in 1781, it was rebuilt in the Baroque style. It has an accessible tower with a panoramic view.

The Church of Saint Giles was originally a Romanesque basilica built in around 1150. It was rebuilt in the early Baroque style in 1689 and includes preserved original interior equipment. In the vicinity is the valuable Roman Catholic parish house, rebuilt in the Broque style in 1626–1636.

The Church of Saint Joseph is a three-nave Neo-Romanesque basilica built in 1894–1896 with valuable decoration. Today the building is owned by a hospital.

The Convent of the Sisters of Grace of the St. Vincent de Paul order, founded in 1871, served as a hospital and later became a social care facility. It includes the Chapel of Saint Vincent de Paul, built in the Neo-Gothic style in 1874.

== Notable people ==
- Hermann Edler von Zeissl (1817–1884), Austrian dermatologist
- Oswald Ottendorfer (1826–1900), German-American journalist, editor and philanthropist
- Alexander Makowsky (1833–1908), Austrian botanist, geologist and paleontologist
- Maximilian Felzmann (1894–1962), Austrian general
- Oskar Schindler (1908–1974), German industrialist credited with saving almost 1,200 Jews during the Holocaust
- Heidi Lück (born 1943), German politician
- Jiří Pernes (1948–2025), historian
- Jan Moravec (born 1987), footballer

== Twin towns – sister cities ==
Svitavy is twinned with:

- Lądek-Zdrój, Poland
- Perechyn, Ukraine
- Stendal, Germany
- Strzelin, Poland
- Žiar nad Hronom, Slovakia
