= Kukle (Svitavy District) =

- Municipality
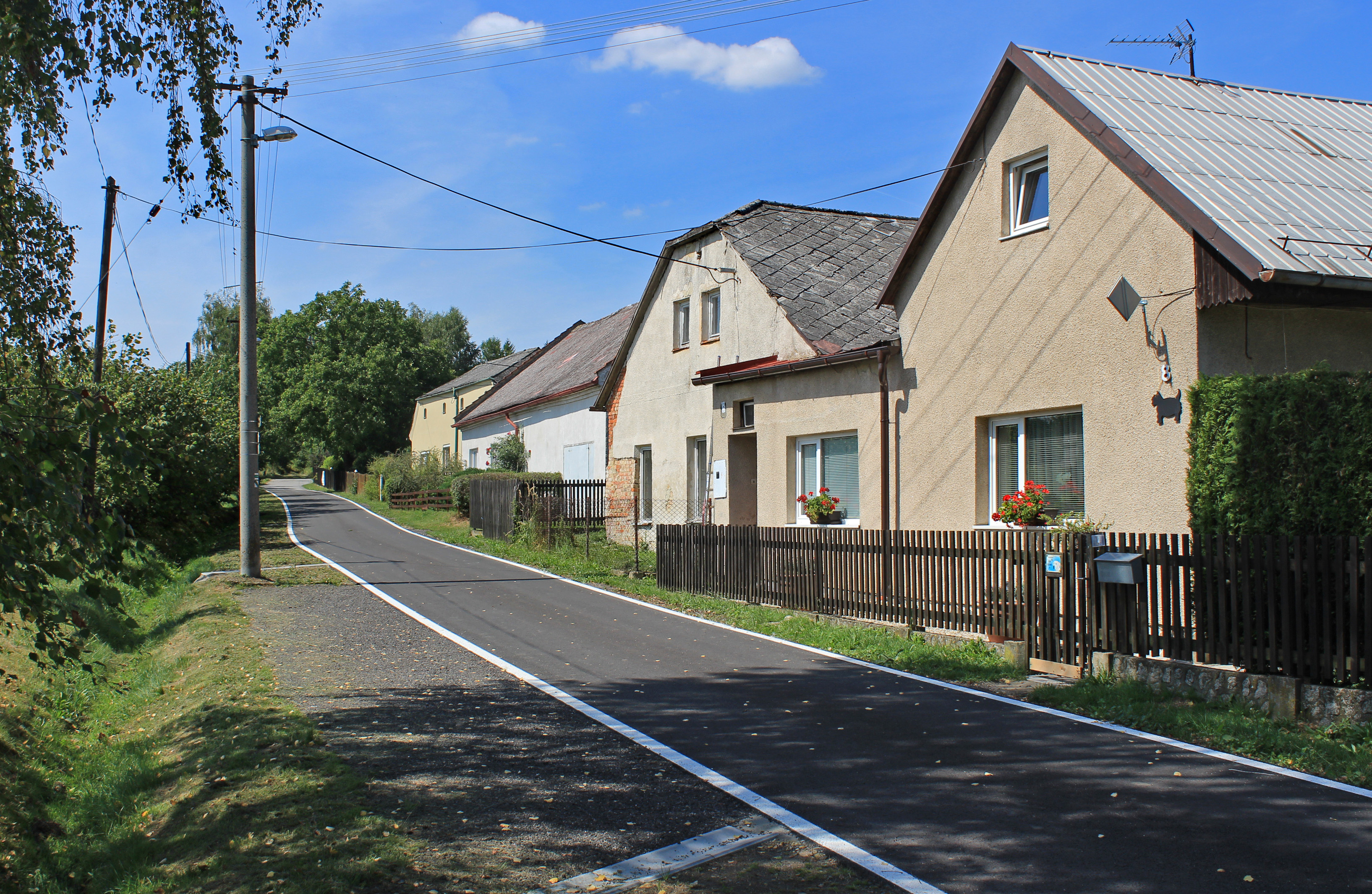
- Side street

- Flag Coat of arms

- Location in the Czech Republic
- Coordinates: 49°47′35″N 16°25′32″E
- Country: Czech Republic
- Region: Pardubice
- District: Svitavy
- First mentioned: 1748

Area
  - Total: 2.96 km^{2} (1.14 sq mi)
- Elevation: 500 m (1,600 ft)

Population (2026-01-01)
  - Total: 84
  - Density: 28/km^{2} (73/sq mi)
- Time zone: UTC+1 (CET)
  - Summer (DST): UTC+2 (CEST)
- Postal code: 568 02
- Website: obec-kukle.cz

Kukle (Czech pronunciation: [ˈkuklɛ]) is a municipality and village in Svitavy District in the Pardubice Region of the Czech Republic. It has about 80 inhabitants.

== Demographics ==
Historical population
Year	Pop.	±%
1869	127	—
1880	133	+4.7%
1890	139	+4.5%
1900	136	−2.2%
1910	142	+4.4%
1921	113	−20.4%
1930	105	−7.1%
1950	43	−59.0%
1961	60	+39.5%
1970	58	−3.3%
1980	60	+3.4%
1991	53	−11.7%
2001	54	+1.9%
2011	67	+24.1%
2021	73	+9.0%
Source: Censuses
