= Pustá Rybná =

- Municipality
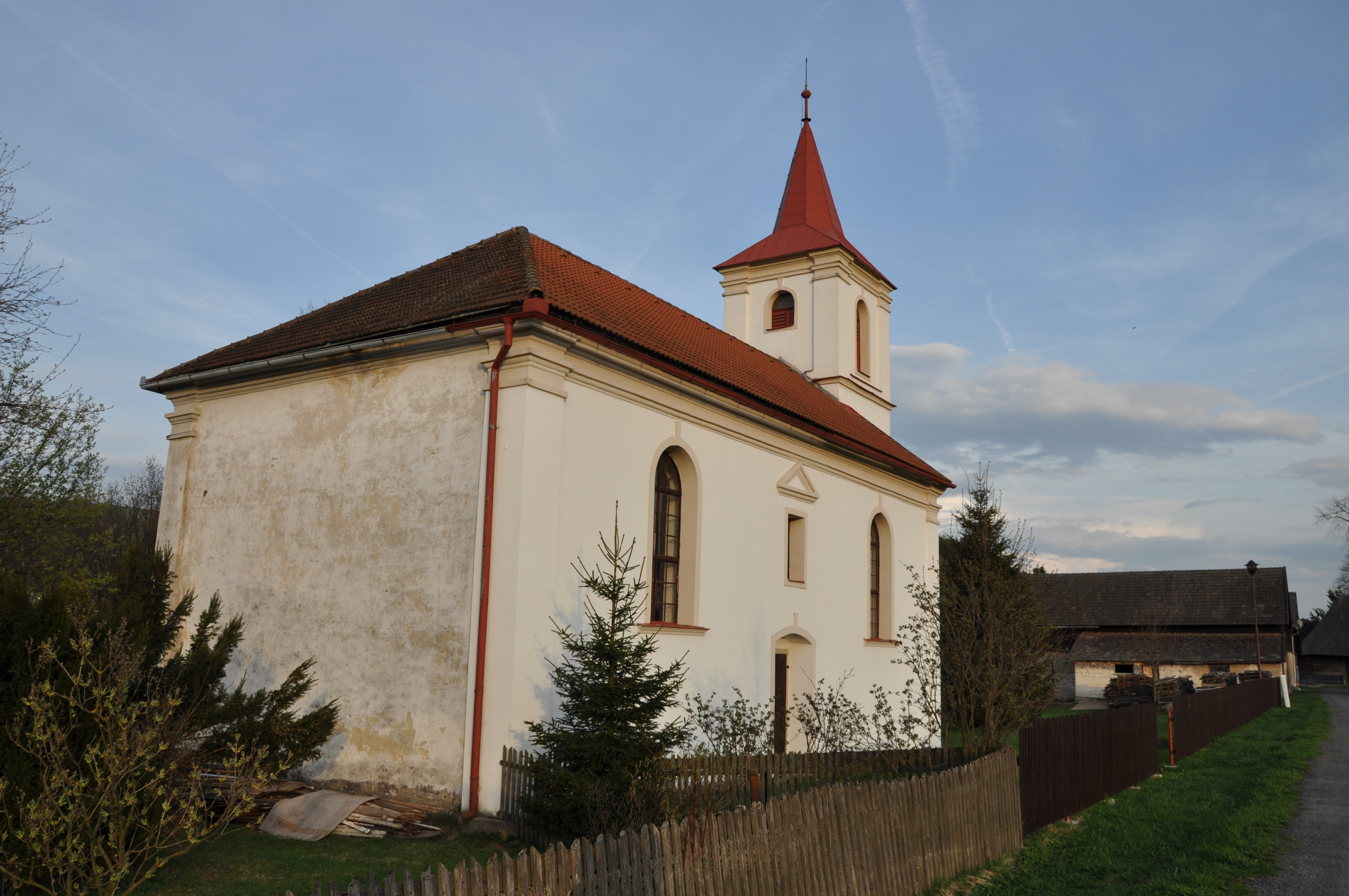
- Evangelical church

- Location in the Czech Republic
- Coordinates: 49°42′36″N 16°8′10″E
- Country: Czech Republic
- Region: Pardubice
- District: Svitavy
- First mentioned: 1392

Area
  - Total: 13.99 km^{2} (5.40 sq mi)
- Elevation: 602 m (1,975 ft)

Population (2026-01-01)
  - Total: 164
  - Density: 11.7/km^{2} (30.4/sq mi)
- Time zone: UTC+1 (CET)
  - Summer (DST): UTC+2 (CEST)
- Postal code: 572 01
- Website: www.pustarybna.cz

Pustá Rybná is a municipality and village in Svitavy District in the Pardubice Region of the Czech Republic. It has about 200 inhabitants.

Pustá Rybná lies approximately 25 kilometres (16 mi) west of Svitavy, 45 km (28 mi) south-east of Pardubice, and 130 km (81 mi) east of Prague.

== Demographics ==
Historical population
Year	Pop.	±%
1869	1,095	—
1880	1,002	−8.5%
1890	914	−8.8%
1900	897	−1.9%
1910	824	−8.1%
1921	751	−8.9%
1930	773	+2.9%
1950	407	−47.3%
1961	369	−9.3%
1970	287	−22.2%
1980	233	−18.8%
1991	197	−15.5%
2001	156	−20.8%
2011	163	+4.5%
2021	153	−6.1%
Source: Censuses
