= Želivsko =

- Municipality
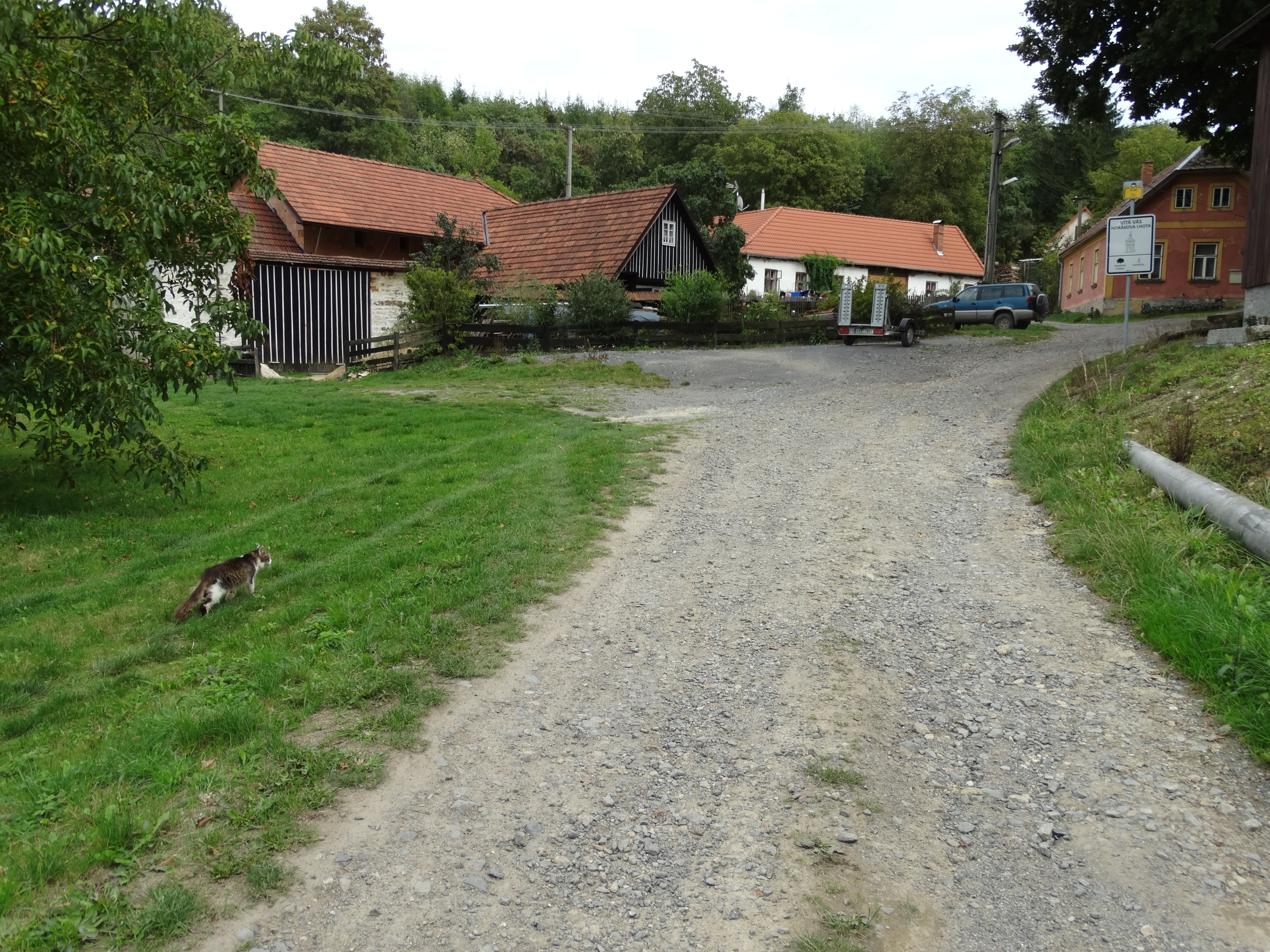
- Horákova Lhota, a part of Želivsko

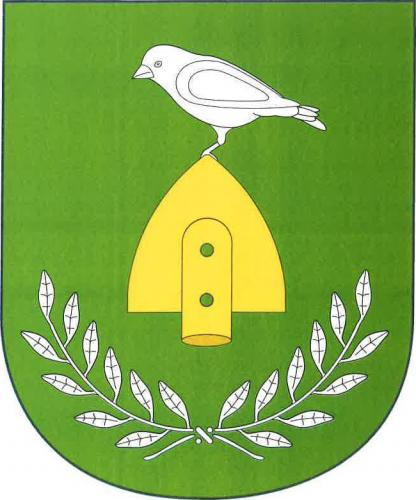
- Coat of arms

- Location in the Czech Republic
- Coordinates: 49°38′28″N 16°34′12″E
- Country: Czech Republic
- Region: Pardubice
- District: Svitavy
- First mentioned: 1317

Area
  - Total: 3.33 km^{2} (1.29 sq mi)
- Elevation: 530 m (1,740 ft)

Population (2026-01-01)
  - Total: 40
  - Density: 12/km^{2} (31/sq mi)
- Time zone: UTC+1 (CET)
  - Summer (DST): UTC+2 (CEST)
- Postal code: 569 04
- Website: www.zelivsko.cz

Želivsko is a municipality and village in Svitavy District in the Pardubice Region of the Czech Republic. It has about 40 inhabitants.

Želivsko lies approximately 15 kilometres (9 mi) south-east of Svitavy, 72 km (45 mi) south-east of Pardubice, and 162 km (101 mi) east of Prague.

== Administrative division ==
Želivsko consists of two municipal parts (in brackets population according to the 2021 census):

- Želivsko (29)
- Horákova Lhota (8)

== Demographics ==
Historical population
Year	Pop.	±%
1869	240	—
1880	279	+16.3%
1890	280	+0.4%
1900	274	−2.1%
1910	300	+9.5%
1921	274	−8.7%
1930	239	−12.8%
1950	162	−32.2%
1961	141	−13.0%
1970	111	−21.3%
1980	83	−25.2%
1991	56	−32.5%
2001	50	−10.7%
2011	34	−32.0%
2021	37	+8.8%
Source: Censuses
