= Oldřiš =

- Municipality
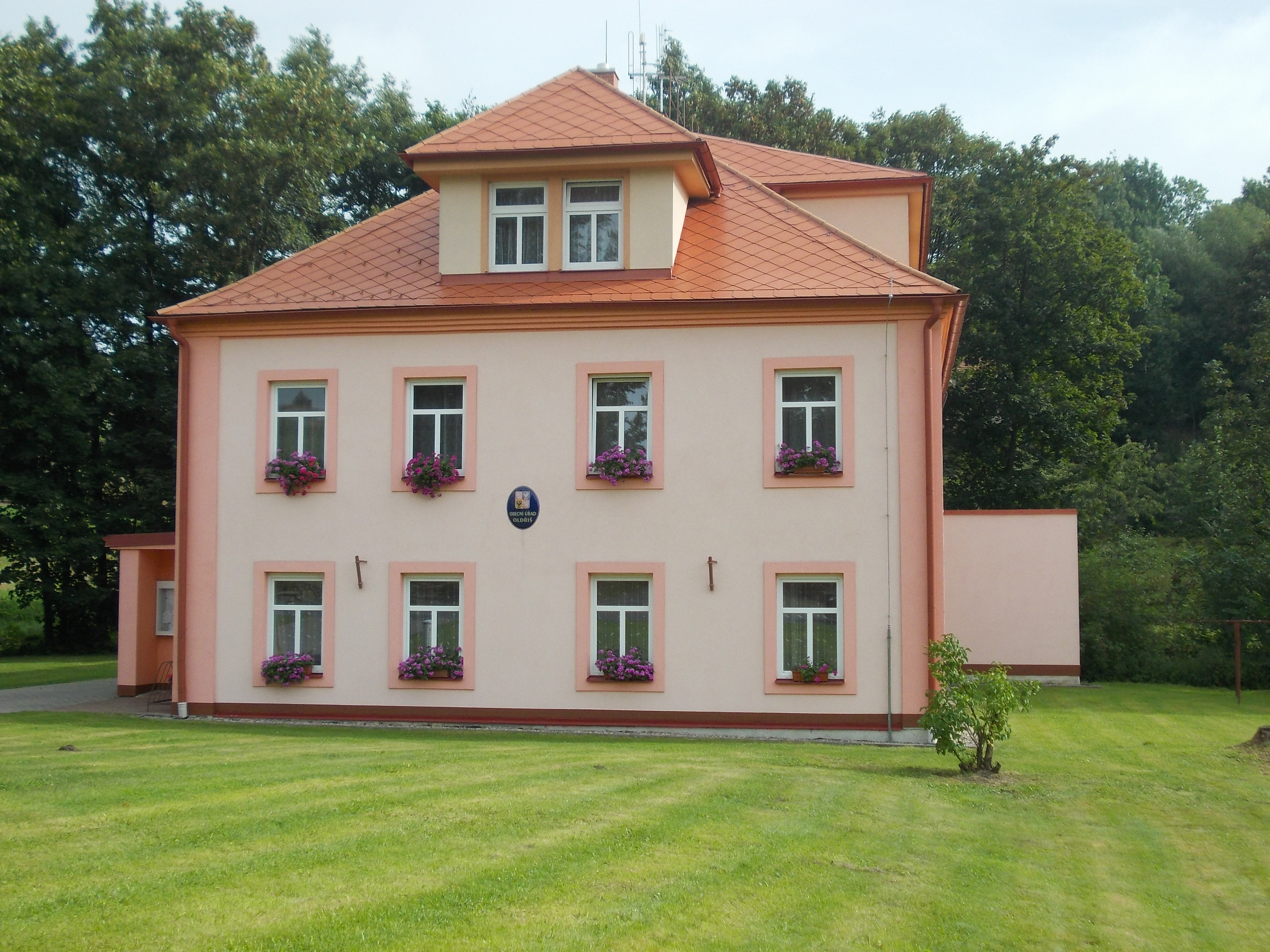
- Municipal office

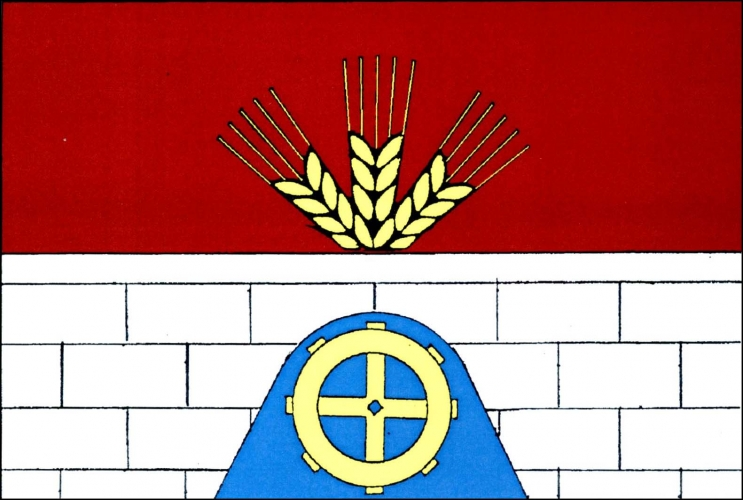
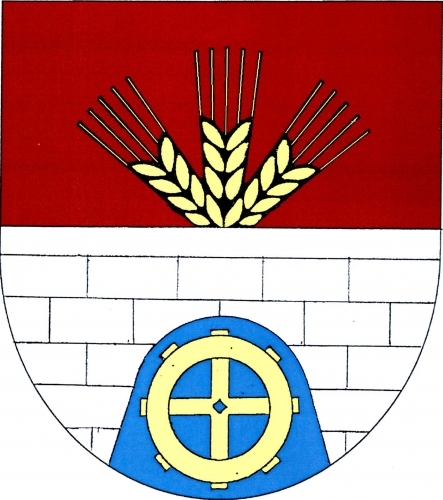
- Flag Coat of arms

- Location in the Czech Republic
- Coordinates: 49°43′38″N 16°11′38″E
- Country: Czech Republic
- Region: Pardubice
- District: Svitavy
- First mentioned: 1547

Area
  - Total: 12.64 km^{2} (4.88 sq mi)
- Elevation: 575 m (1,886 ft)

Population (2026-01-01)
  - Total: 662
  - Density: 52.4/km^{2} (136/sq mi)
- Time zone: UTC+1 (CET)
  - Summer (DST): UTC+2 (CEST)
- Postal code: 569 82
- Website: www.oldris.cz

Oldřiš is a municipality and village in Svitavy District in the Pardubice Region of the Czech Republic. It has about 700 inhabitants.

Oldřiš lies approximately 21 kilometres (13 mi) west of Svitavy, 46 km (29 mi) south-east of Pardubice, and 133 km (83 mi) east of Prague.

== Demographics ==
Historical population
Year	Pop.	±%
1869	1,160	—
1880	1,139	−1.8%
1890	1,049	−7.9%
1900	1,027	−2.1%
1910	1,072	+4.4%
1921	1,019	−4.9%
1930	1,026	+0.7%
1950	790	−23.0%
1961	783	−0.9%
1970	726	−7.3%
1980	703	−3.2%
1991	653	−7.1%
2001	680	+4.1%
2011	622	−8.5%
2021	603	−3.1%
Source: Censuses
