= Lavičné =

- Municipality
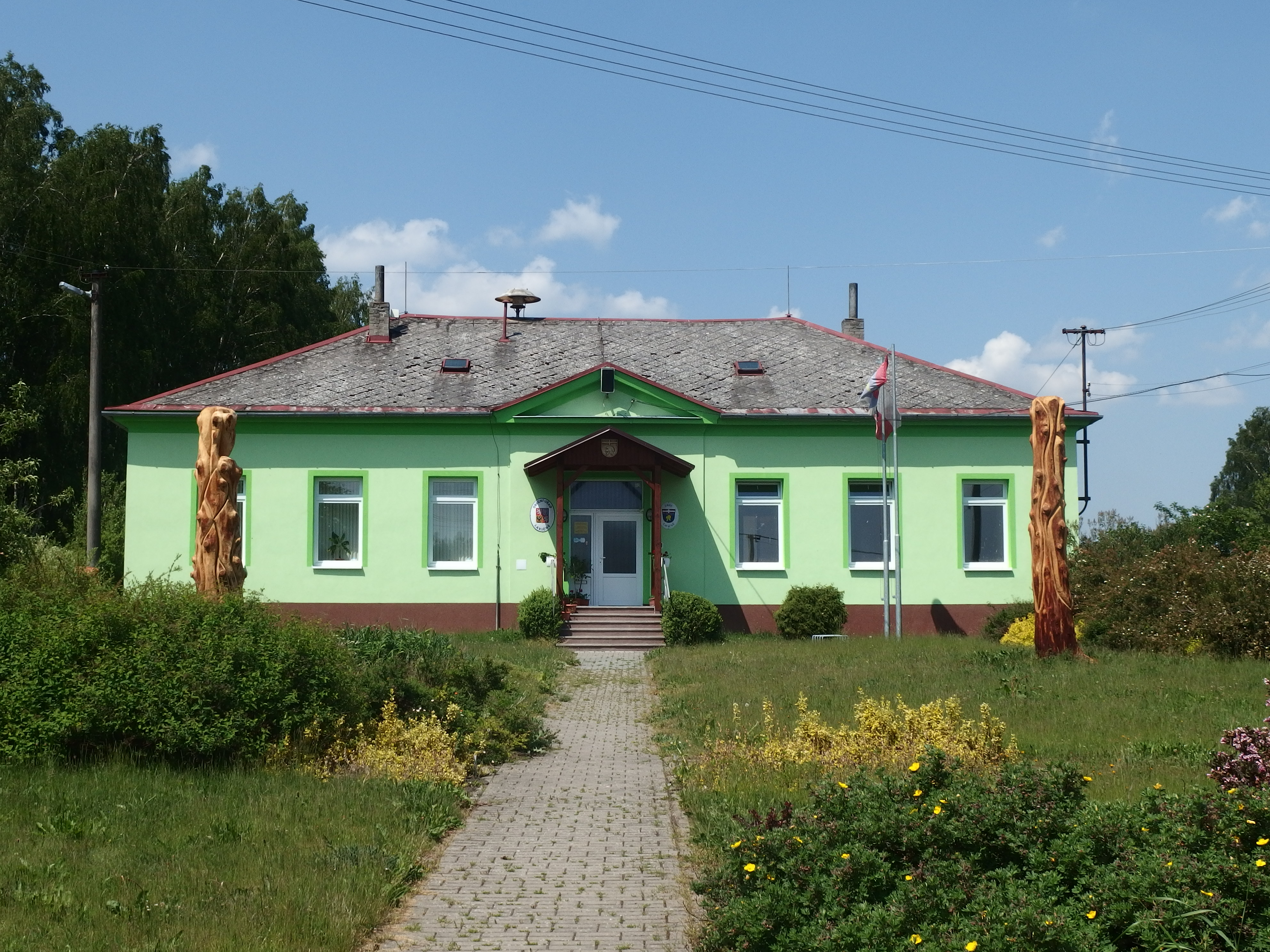
- Municipal office

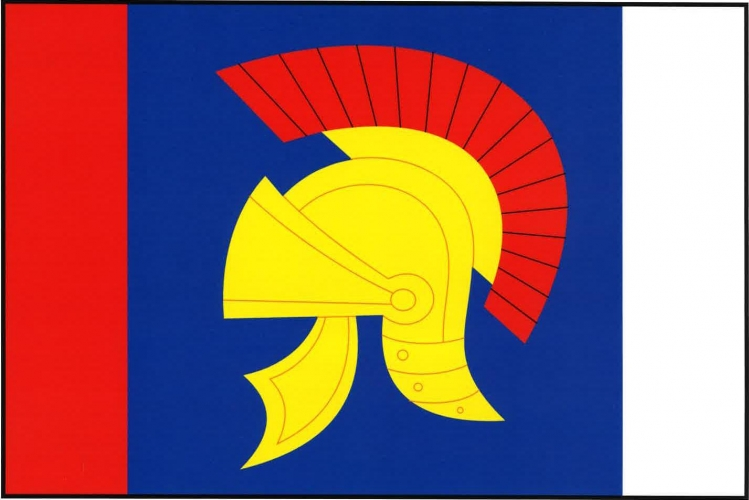
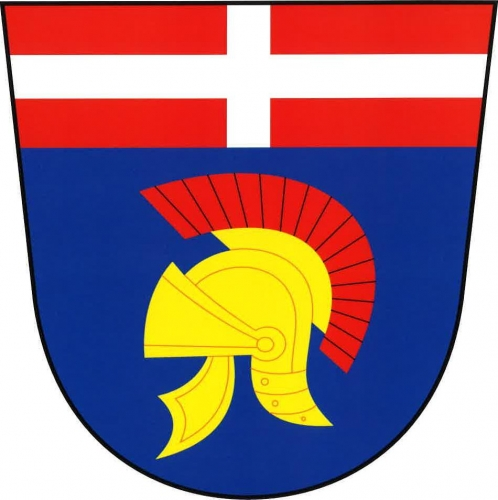
- Flag Coat of arms

- Location in the Czech Republic
- Coordinates: 49°38′37″N 16°27′45″E
- Country: Czech Republic
- Region: Pardubice
- District: Svitavy
- First mentioned: 1293

Area
  - Total: 4.69 km^{2} (1.81 sq mi)
- Elevation: 444 m (1,457 ft)

Population (2026-01-01)
  - Total: 129
  - Density: 27.5/km^{2} (71.2/sq mi)
- Time zone: UTC+1 (CET)
  - Summer (DST): UTC+2 (CEST)
- Postal code: 569 04
- Website: www.lavicne.cz

Lavičné is a municipality and village in Svitavy District in the Pardubice Region of the Czech Republic. It has about 100 inhabitants.

Lavičné lies approximately 13 kilometres (8 mi) south of Svitavy, 66 km (41 mi) south-east of Pardubice, and 154 km (96 mi) east of Prague.

== Demographics ==
Historical population
Year	Pop.	±%
1869	270	—
1880	281	+4.1%
1890	291	+3.6%
1900	330	+13.4%
1910	330	+0.0%
1921	294	−10.9%
1930	271	−7.8%
1950	168	−38.0%
1961	183	+8.9%
1970	166	−9.3%
1980	153	−7.8%
1991	162	+5.9%
2001	136	−16.0%
2011	116	−14.7%
2021	112	−3.4%
Source: Censuses
