= Poříčí u Litomyšle =

- Municipality
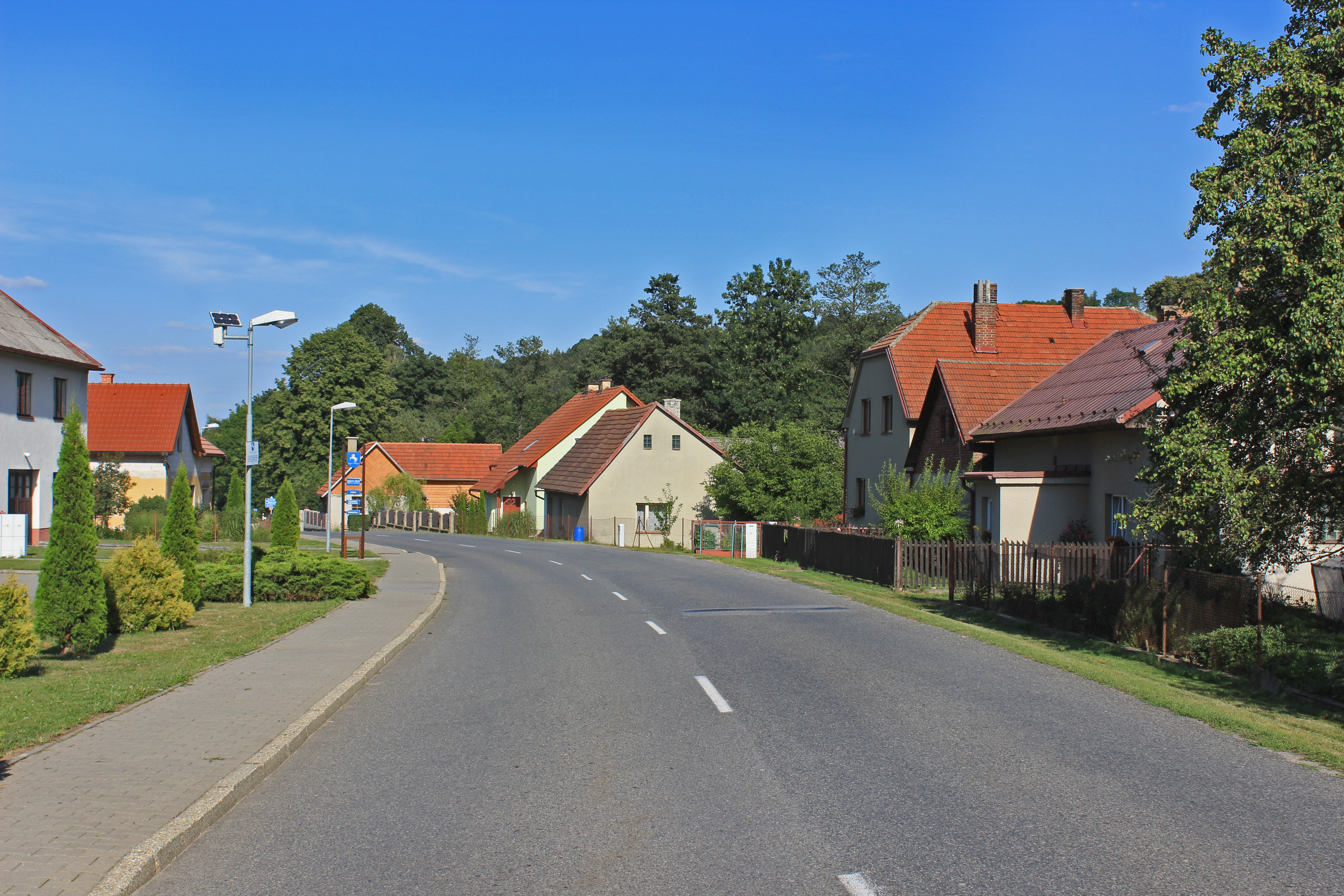
- Main road

- Flag Coat of arms

- Location in the Czech Republic
- Coordinates: 49°47′54″N 16°11′38″E
- Country: Czech Republic
- Region: Pardubice
- District: Svitavy
- First mentioned: 1361

Area
  - Total: 6.51 km^{2} (2.51 sq mi)
- Elevation: 435 m (1,427 ft)

Population (2026-01-01)
  - Total: 528
  - Density: 81.1/km^{2} (210/sq mi)
- Time zone: UTC+1 (CET)
  - Summer (DST): UTC+2 (CEST)
- Postal code: 570 01
- Website: www.obecporici.cz

Poříčí u Litomyšle is a municipality and village in Svitavy District in the Pardubice Region of the Czech Republic. It has about 500 inhabitants.

Poříčí u Litomyšle lies approximately 20 kilometres (12 mi) west of Svitavy, 41 km (25 mi) south-east of Pardubice, and 132 km (82 mi) east of Prague.

== Administrative division ==
Poříčí u Litomyšle consists of three municipal parts (in brackets population according to the 2021 census):

- Poříčí u Litomyšle (322)
- Mladočov (90)
- Zrnětín (93)

== Demographics ==
Historical population
| Year | Pop. | ±% |
|---|---|---|
| 1869 | 846 | — |
| 1880 | 826 | −2.4% |
| 1890 | 777 | −5.9% |
| 1900 | 728 | −6.3% |
| 1910 | 770 | +5.8% |
| 1921 | 700 | −9.1% |
| 1930 | 661 | −5.6% |
| 1950 | 552 | −16.5% |
| 1961 | 512 | −7.2% |
| 1970 | 473 | −7.6% |
| 1980 | 440 | −7.0% |
| 1991 | 393 | −10.7% |
| 2001 | 412 | +4.8% |
| 2011 | 456 | +10.7% |
| 2021 | 505 | +10.7% |
Source: Censuses
