= Řídký =

- Municipality
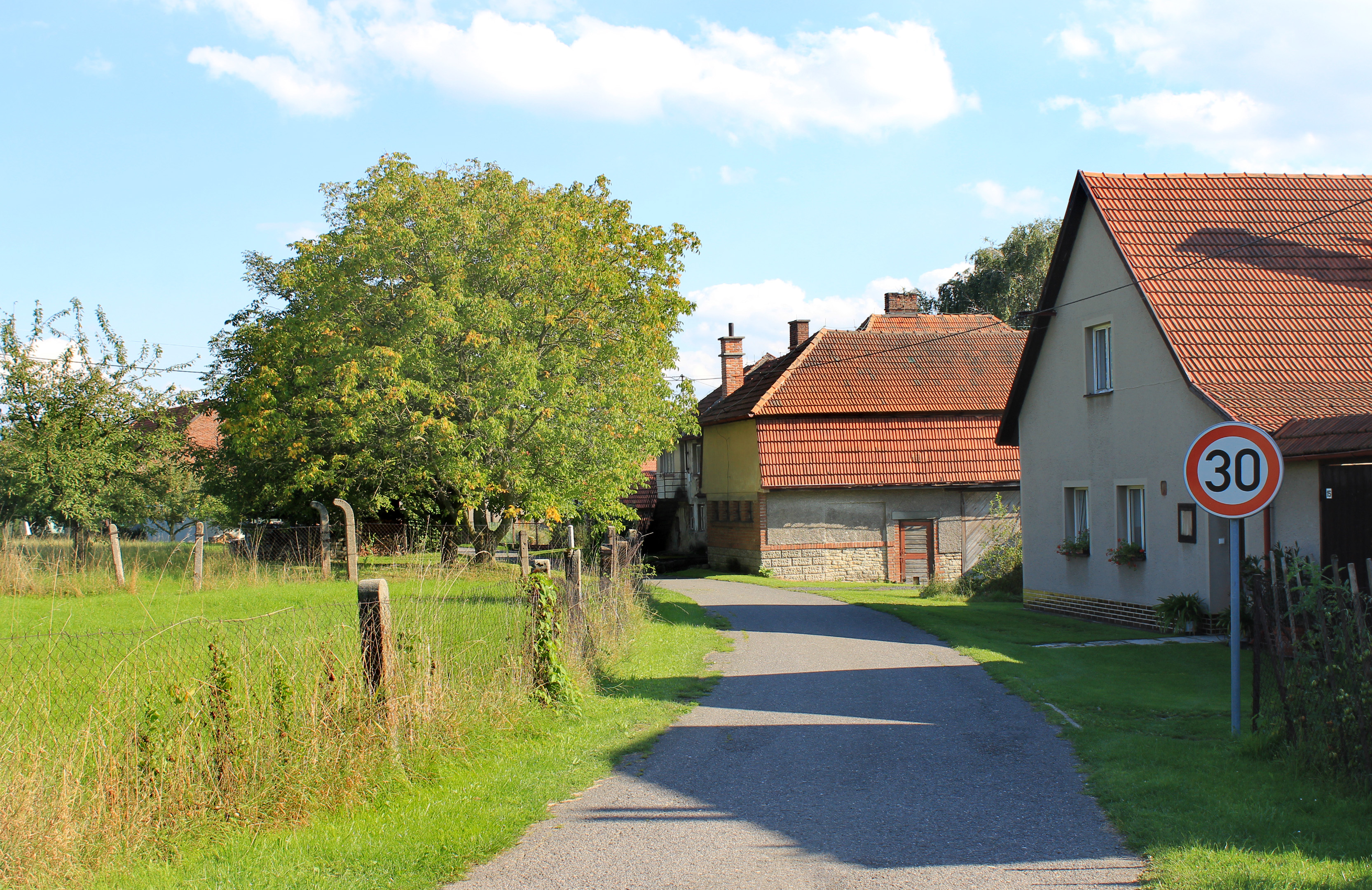
- Western part of Řídký

- Location in the Czech Republic
- Coordinates: 49°53′39″N 16°14′35″E
- Country: Czech Republic
- Region: Pardubice
- District: Svitavy
- First mentioned: 1689

Area
  - Total: 1.41 km^{2} (0.54 sq mi)
- Elevation: 308 m (1,010 ft)

Population (2026-01-01)
  - Total: 59
  - Density: 42/km^{2} (110/sq mi)
- Time zone: UTC+1 (CET)
  - Summer (DST): UTC+2 (CEST)
- Postal code: 570 01
- Website: www.obecridky.cz

Řídký is a municipality and village in Svitavy District in the Pardubice Region of the Czech Republic. It has about 60 inhabitants.

Řídký lies approximately 23 kilometres (14 mi) north-west of Svitavy, 37 km (23 mi) south-east of Pardubice, and 132 km (82 mi) east of Prague.

== Demographics ==
Historical population
Year	Pop.	±%
1869	63	—
1880	61	−3.2%
1890	89	+45.9%
1900	71	−20.2%
1910	54	−23.9%
1921	61	+13.0%
1930	64	+4.9%
1950	87	+35.9%
1961	89	+2.3%
1970	81	−9.0%
1980	86	+6.2%
1991	74	−14.0%
2001	68	−8.1%
2011	75	+10.3%
2021	60	−20.0%
Source: Censuses
