= Chrastavec =

- Municipality
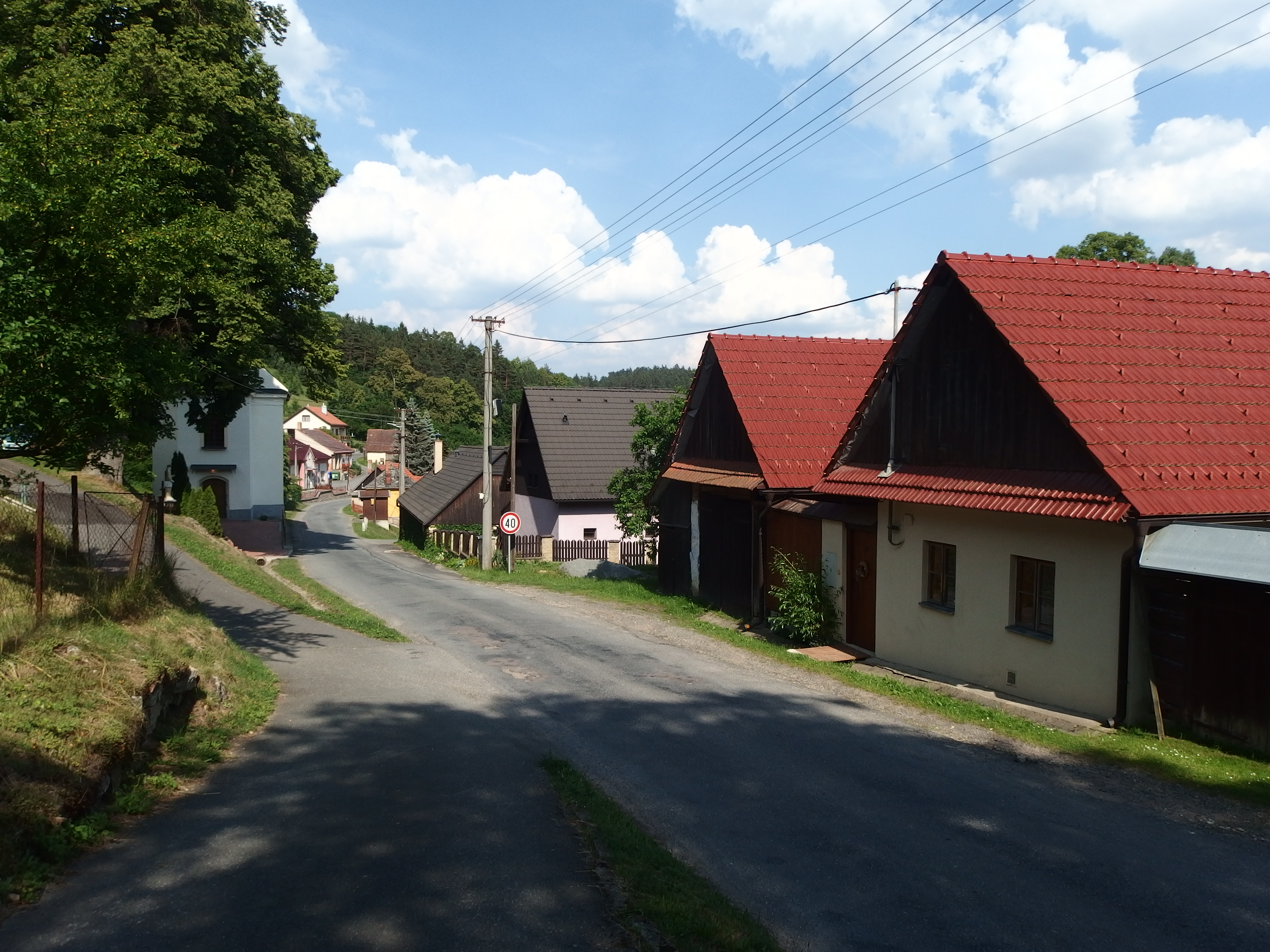
- Main street

- Flag Coat of arms

- Location in the Czech Republic
- Coordinates: 49°37′4″N 16°30′11″E
- Country: Czech Republic
- Region: Pardubice
- District: Svitavy
- First mentioned: 1318

Area
  - Total: 5.41 km^{2} (2.09 sq mi)
- Elevation: 455 m (1,493 ft)

Population (2026-01-01)
  - Total: 236
  - Density: 43.6/km^{2} (113/sq mi)
- Time zone: UTC+1 (CET)
  - Summer (DST): UTC+2 (CEST)
- Postal code: 569 04
- Website: www.obecchrastavec.cz

Chrastavec is a municipality and village in Svitavy District in the Pardubice Region of the Czech Republic. It has about 200 inhabitants.

Chrastavec lies approximately 16 kilometres (10 mi) south of Svitavy, 70 km (43 mi) south-east of Pardubice, and 159 km (99 mi) east of Prague.

== Administrative division ==
Chrastavec consists of two municipal parts (in brackets population according to the 2021 census):

- Chrastavec (115)
- Půlpecen (84)

== Demographics ==
Historical population
Year	Pop.	±%
1869	345	—
1880	408	+18.3%
1890	421	+3.2%
1900	427	+1.4%
1910	510	+19.4%
1921	531	+4.1%
1930	533	+0.4%
1950	436	−18.2%
1961	457	+4.8%
1970	441	−3.5%
1980	348	−21.1%
1991	299	−14.1%
2001	272	−9.0%
2011	228	−16.2%
2021	199	−12.7%
Source: Censuses
