= Študlov (Svitavy District) =

- Municipality
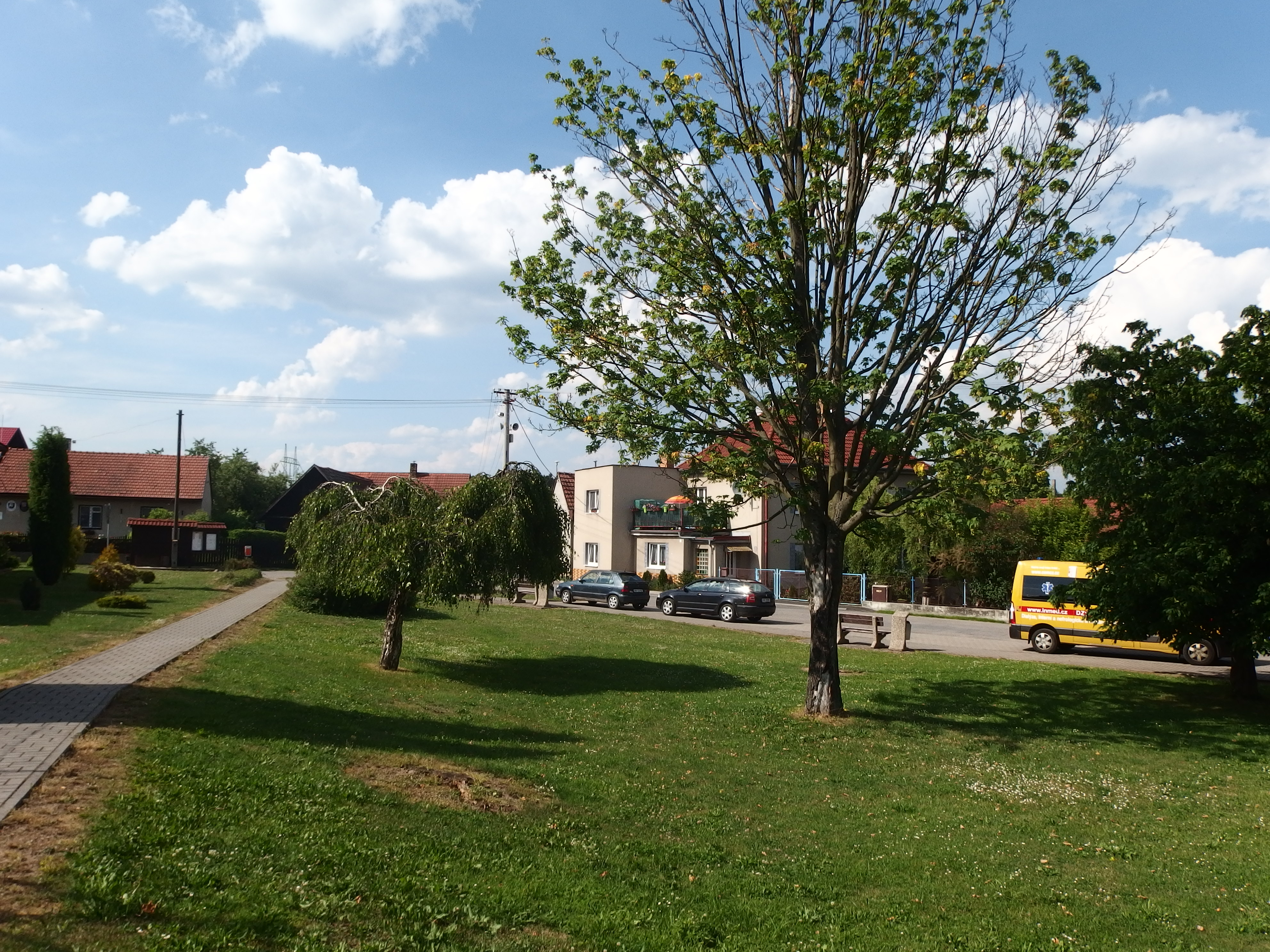
- Centre of Študlov

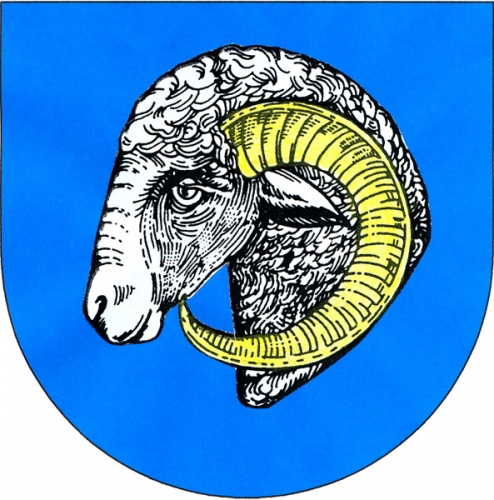
- Flag Coat of arms

- Location in the Czech Republic
- Coordinates: 49°36′9″N 16°29′54″E
- Country: Czech Republic
- Region: Pardubice
- District: Svitavy
- First mentioned: 1629

Area
  - Total: 2.40 km^{2} (0.93 sq mi)
- Elevation: 514 m (1,686 ft)

Population (2026-01-01)
  - Total: 111
  - Density: 46.2/km^{2} (120/sq mi)
- Time zone: UTC+1 (CET)
  - Summer (DST): UTC+2 (CEST)
- Postal code: 569 04
- Website: www.studlov-svitavy.cz

Študlov is a municipality and village in Svitavy District in the Pardubice Region of the Czech Republic. It has about 100 inhabitants.

Študlov lies approximately 18 kilometres (11 mi) south of Svitavy, 72 km (45 mi) south-east of Pardubice, and 159 km (99 mi) east of Prague.

== Demographics ==
Historical population
Year	Pop.	±%
1869	221	—
1880	244	+10.4%
1890	259	+6.1%
1900	279	+7.7%
1910	312	+11.8%
1921	307	−1.6%
1930	324	+5.5%
1950	229	−29.3%
1961	248	+8.3%
1970	231	−6.9%
1980	186	−19.5%
1991	161	−13.4%
2001	157	−2.5%
2011	124	−21.0%
2021	103	−16.9%
Source: Censuses
