= Březinky =

- Municipality
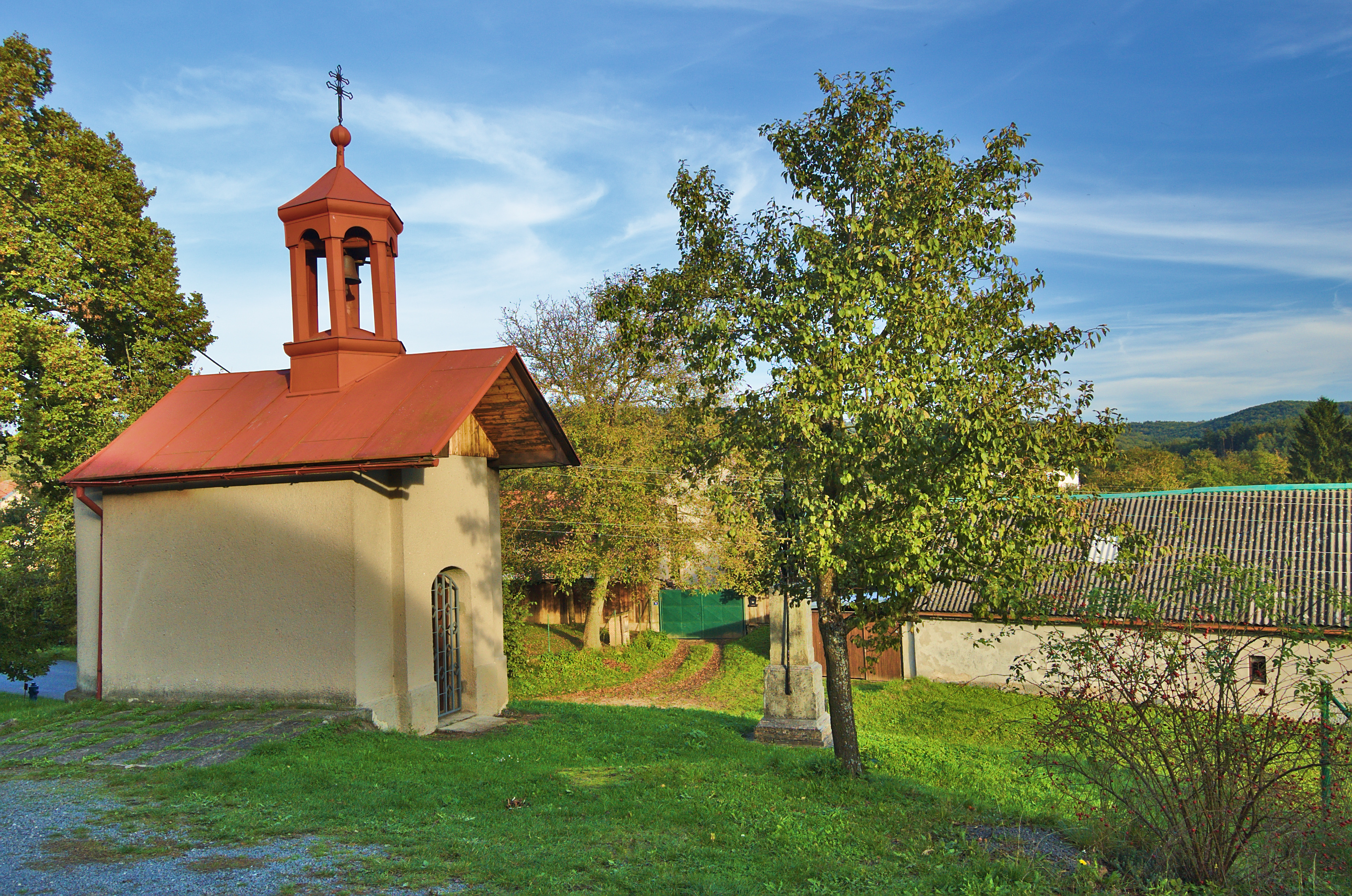
- Chapel of the Nativity of the Virgin Mary

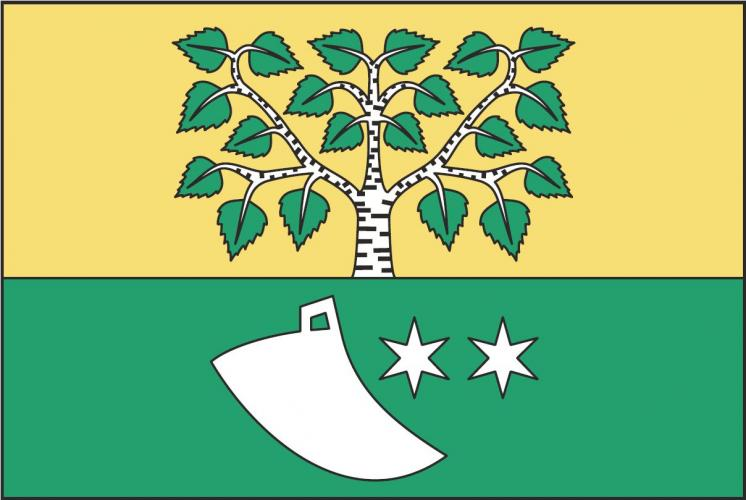
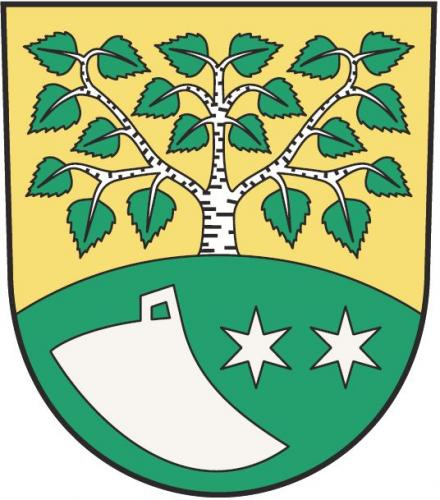
- Flag Coat of arms

- Location in the Czech Republic
- Coordinates: 49°39′46″N 16°47′13″E
- Country: Czech Republic
- Region: Pardubice
- District: Svitavy
- First mentioned: 1361

Area
  - Total: 3.31 km^{2} (1.28 sq mi)
- Elevation: 404 m (1,325 ft)

Population (2026-01-01)
  - Total: 125
  - Density: 37.8/km^{2} (97.8/sq mi)
- Time zone: UTC+1 (CET)
  - Summer (DST): UTC+2 (CEST)
- Postal code: 569 43
- Website: www.brezinky.cz

Březinky is a municipality and village in Svitavy District in the Pardubice Region of the Czech Republic. It has about 100 inhabitants.

Březinky lies approximately 26 kilometres (16 mi) south-east of Svitavy, 84 km (52 mi) south-east of Pardubice, and 177 km (110 mi) east of Prague.

== Administrative division ==
Březinky consists of two municipal parts (in brackets population according to the 2021 census):

- Březinky (85)
- Nectava (35)

== Demographics ==
Historical population
| Year | Pop. | ±% |
|---|---|---|
| 1869 | 245 | — |
| 1880 | 249 | +1.6% |
| 1890 | 248 | −0.4% |
| 1900 | 211 | −14.9% |
| 1910 | 196 | −7.1% |
| 1921 | 207 | +5.6% |
| 1930 | 191 | −7.7% |
| 1950 | 157 | −17.8% |
| 1961 | 193 | +22.9% |
| 1970 | 192 | −0.5% |
| 1980 | 210 | +9.4% |
| 1991 | 148 | −29.5% |
| 2001 | 143 | −3.4% |
| 2011 | 134 | −6.3% |
| 2021 | 120 | −10.4% |
Source: Censuses
