= Příluka =

- Municipality
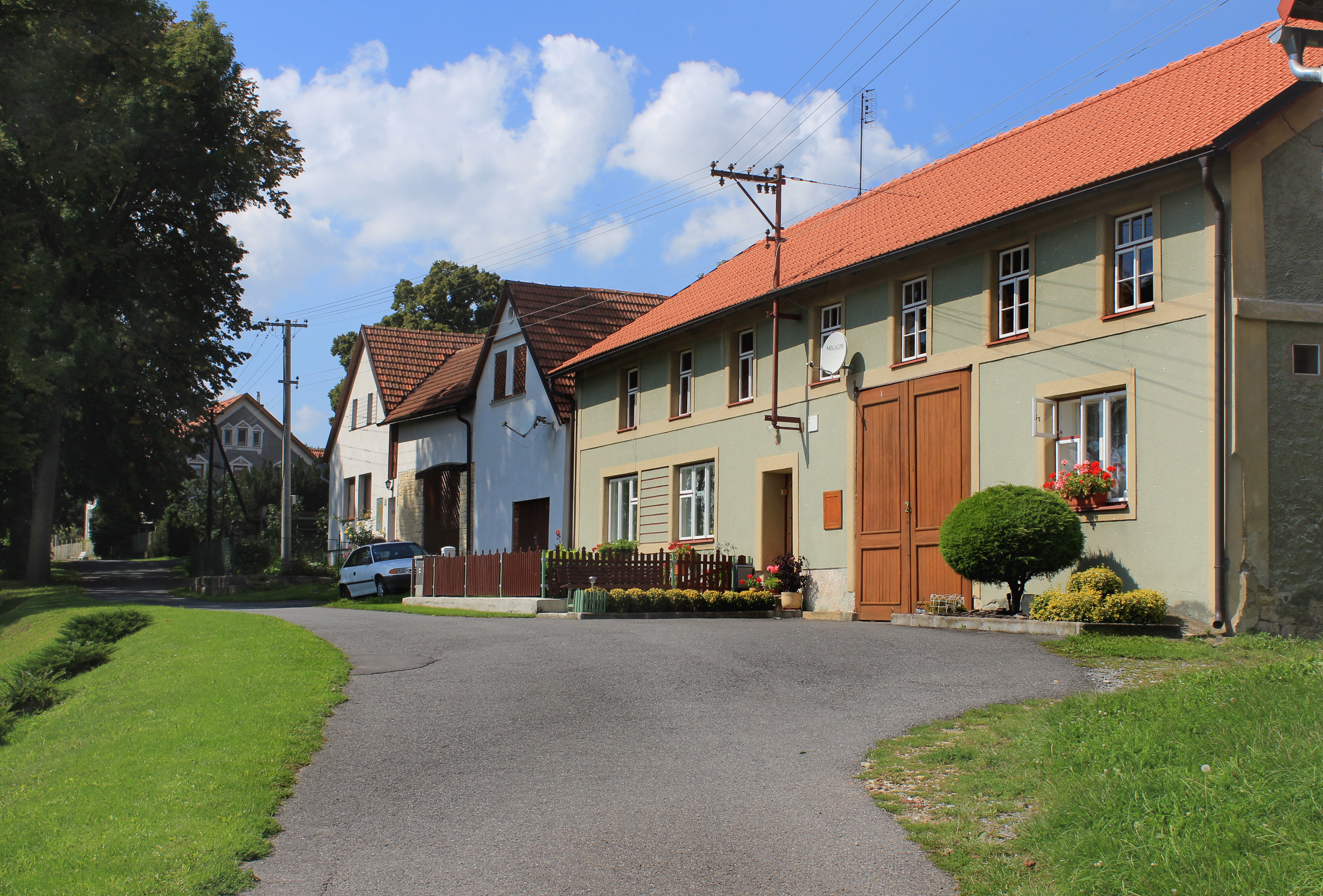
- Upper part of Příluka

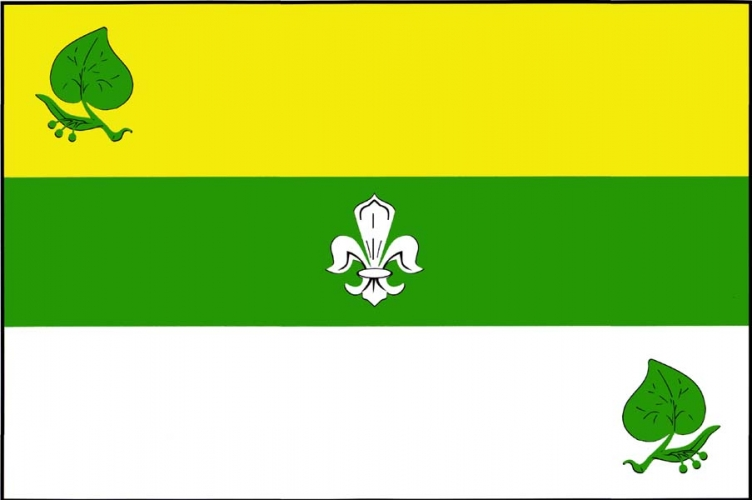
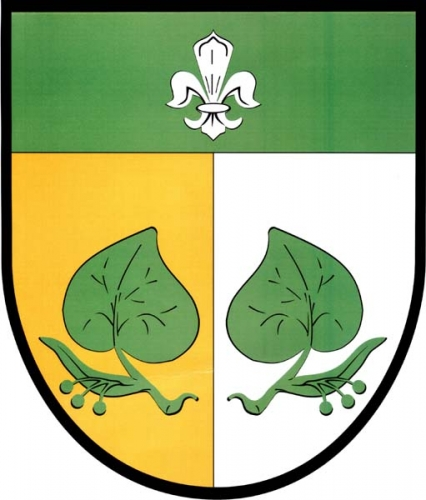
- Flag Coat of arms

- Location in the Czech Republic
- Coordinates: 49°51′54″N 16°9′24″E
- Country: Czech Republic
- Region: Pardubice
- District: Svitavy
- First mentioned: 1355

Area
  - Total: 3.81 km^{2} (1.47 sq mi)
- Elevation: 455 m (1,493 ft)

Population (2026-01-01)
  - Total: 175
  - Density: 45.9/km^{2} (119/sq mi)
- Time zone: UTC+1 (CET)
  - Summer (DST): UTC+2 (CEST)
- Postal code: 539 44
- Website: www.priluka.cz

Příluka is a municipality and village in Svitavy District in the Pardubice Region of the Czech Republic. It has about 200 inhabitants.

Příluka lies approximately 26 kilometres (16 mi) north-west of Svitavy, 34 km (21 mi) south-east of Pardubice, and 127 km (79 mi) east of Prague.

== Demographics ==
Historical population
Year	Pop.	±%
1869	340	—
1880	354	+4.1%
1890	323	−8.8%
1900	319	−1.2%
1910	346	+8.5%
1921	332	−4.0%
1930	320	−3.6%
1950	224	−30.0%
1961	223	−0.4%
1970	207	−7.2%
1980	195	−5.8%
1991	176	−9.7%
2001	162	−8.0%
2011	179	+10.5%
2021	158	−11.7%
Source: Censuses
