= Desná (Svitavy District) =

- Municipality
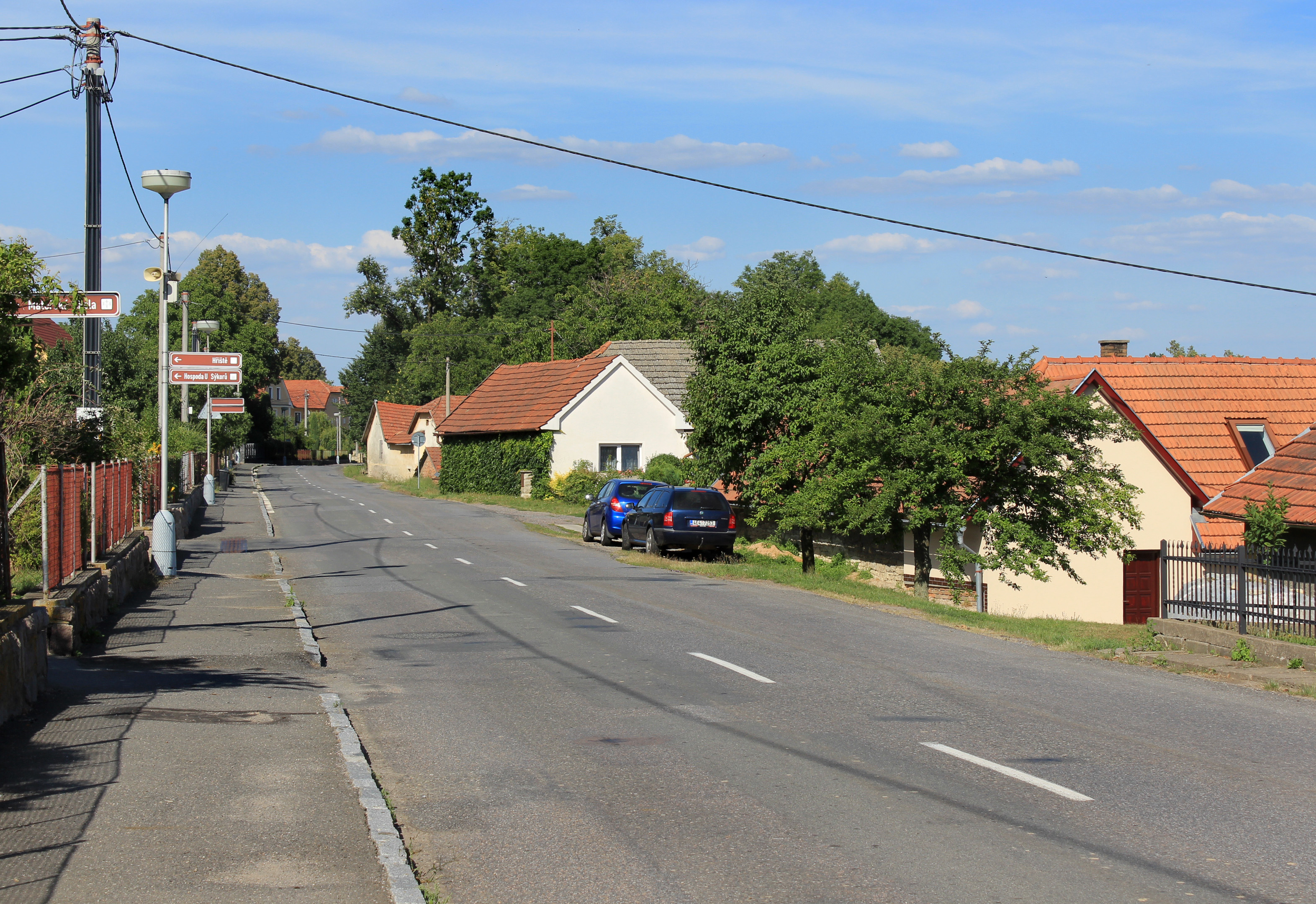
- Main road

- Flag Coat of arms

- Location in the Czech Republic
- Coordinates: 49°48′27″N 16°13′27″E
- Country: Czech Republic
- Region: Pardubice
- District: Svitavy
- First mentioned: 1293

Area
  - Total: 4.78 km^{2} (1.85 sq mi)
- Elevation: 455 m (1,493 ft)

Population (2026-01-01)
  - Total: 376
  - Density: 78.7/km^{2} (204/sq mi)
- Time zone: UTC+1 (CET)
  - Summer (DST): UTC+2 (CEST)
- Postal code: 570 01
- Website: www.obecdesna.cz

Desná is a municipality and village in Svitavy District in the Pardubice Region of the Czech Republic. It has about 400 inhabitants.

Desná lies approximately 20 kilometres (12 mi) west of Svitavy, 41 km (25 mi) south-east of Pardubice, and 133 km (83 mi) east of Prague.

== Demographics ==
Historical population
Year	Pop.	±%
1869	523	—
1880	539	+3.1%
1890	538	−0.2%
1900	533	−0.9%
1910	516	−3.2%
1921	507	−1.7%
1930	473	−6.7%
1950	318	−32.8%
1961	383	+20.4%
1970	350	−8.6%
1980	375	+7.1%
1991	357	−4.8%
2001	334	−6.4%
2011	320	−4.2%
2021	373	+16.6%
Source: Censuses
