= František Mašlaň =

Czech ice hockey player (1933–2026)

Personal information
- Born: 19 February 1933 Chornice, Czechoslovakia
- Died: 20 February 2026 (aged 93) Czech Republic

František Mašlán (19 February 1933 – 20 February 2026) was a Czech ice hockey player who competed in the 1960 Winter Olympics.

Mašlaň was born in Chornice, Czechoslovakia on 19 February 1933, and died on 20 February 2026, one day after his 93rd birthday.
