= Hartinkov =

- Municipality
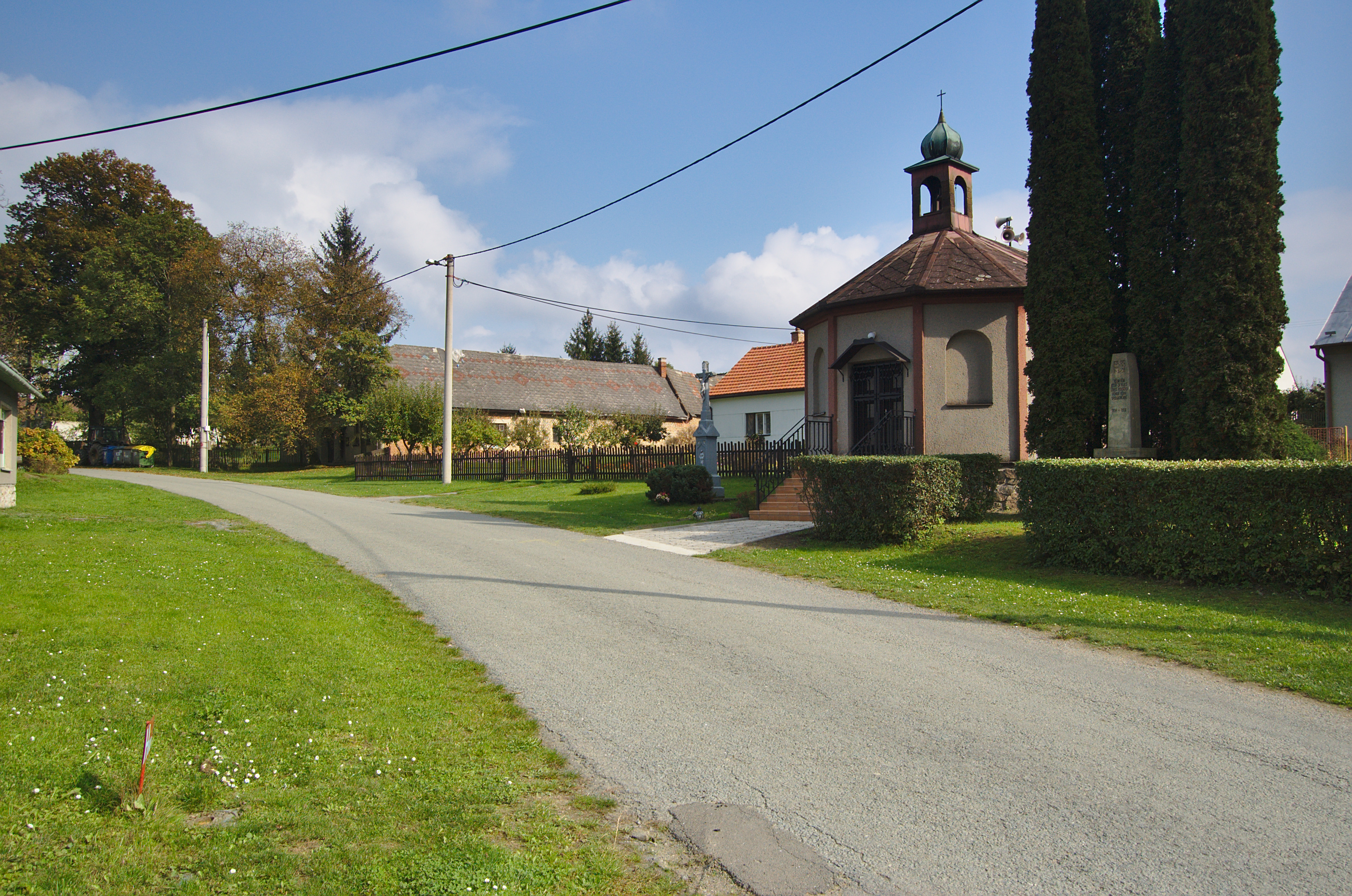
- Chapel of Saint Wenceslaus

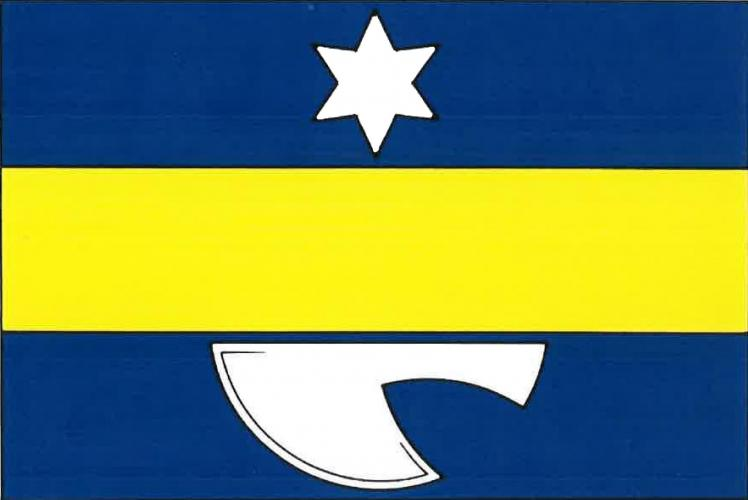
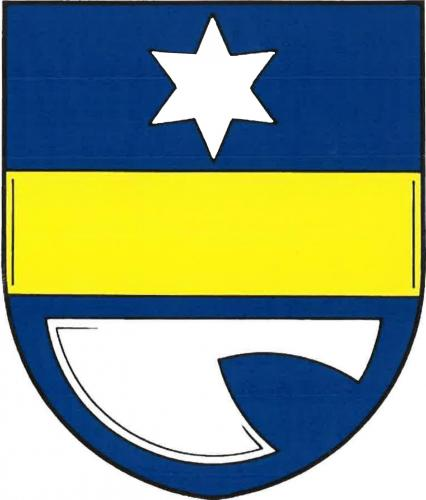
- Flag Coat of arms

- Location in the Czech Republic
- Coordinates: 49°40′45″N 16°48′50″E
- Country: Czech Republic
- Region: Pardubice
- District: Svitavy
- First mentioned: 1291

Area
  - Total: 5.14 km^{2} (1.98 sq mi)
- Elevation: 511 m (1,677 ft)

Population (2026-01-01)
  - Total: 54
  - Density: 11/km^{2} (27/sq mi)
- Time zone: UTC+1 (CET)
  - Summer (DST): UTC+2 (CEST)
- Postal code: 569 43
- Website: www.hartinkov.cz

Hartinkov is a municipality and village in Svitavy District in the Pardubice Region of the Czech Republic. It has about 50 inhabitants.

Hartinkov lies approximately 27 kilometres (17 mi) east of Svitavy, 85 km (53 mi) south-east of Pardubice, and 178 km (111 mi) east of Prague.

== Demographics ==
Historical population
Year	Pop.	±%
1869	426	—
1880	414	−2.8%
1890	385	−7.0%
1900	350	−9.1%
1910	325	−7.1%
1921	299	−8.0%
1930	287	−4.0%
1950	131	−54.4%
1961	146	+11.5%
1970	140	−4.1%
1980	101	−27.9%
1991	78	−22.8%
2001	68	−12.8%
2011	58	−14.7%
2021	54	−6.9%
Source: Censuses
