= Vlčkov =

- Municipality
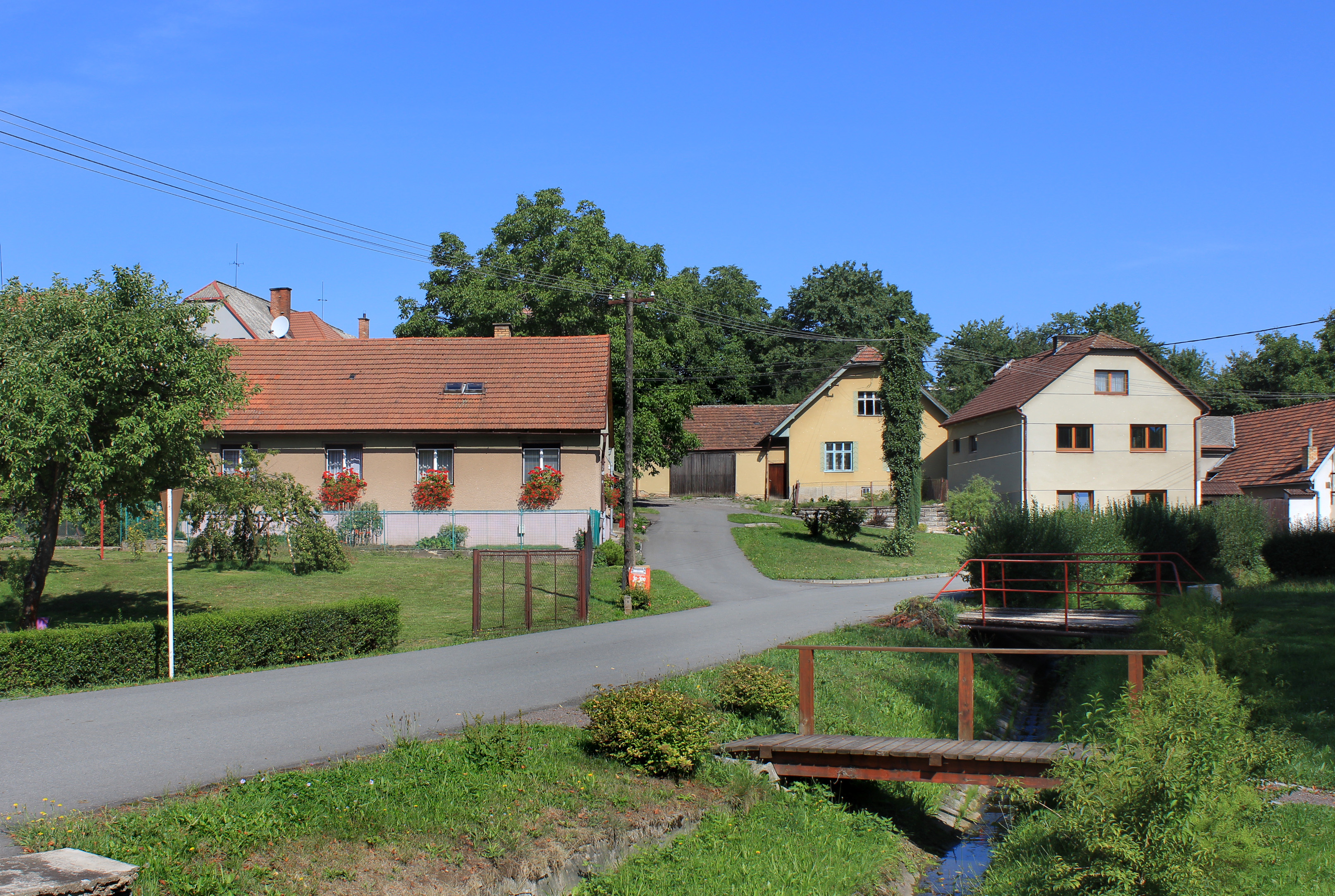
- Centre of Vlčkov

- Location in the Czech Republic
- Coordinates: 49°54′27″N 16°21′0″E
- Country: Czech Republic
- Region: Pardubice
- District: Svitavy
- First mentioned: 1292

Area
  - Total: 2.85 km^{2} (1.10 sq mi)
- Elevation: 415 m (1,362 ft)

Population (2026-01-01)
  - Total: 119
  - Density: 41.8/km^{2} (108/sq mi)
- Time zone: UTC+1 (CET)
  - Summer (DST): UTC+2 (CEST)
- Postal code: 560 02
- Website: www.vlckov.eu

Vlčkov is a municipality and village in Svitavy District in the Pardubice Region of the Czech Republic. It has about 100 inhabitants.

Vlčkov lies approximately 20 kilometres (12 mi) north-west of Svitavy, 44 km (27 mi) east of Pardubice, and 141 km (88 mi) east of Prague.

== Demographics ==
Historical population
Year	Pop.	±%
1869	280	—
1880	295	+5.4%
1890	288	−2.4%
1900	271	−5.9%
1910	264	−2.6%
1921	264	+0.0%
1930	271	+2.7%
1950	181	−33.2%
1961	171	−5.5%
1970	132	−22.8%
1980	109	−17.4%
1991	97	−11.0%
2001	101	+4.1%
2011	98	−3.0%
2021	100	+2.0%
Source: Censuses
