= Chotovice (Svitavy District) =

- Municipality
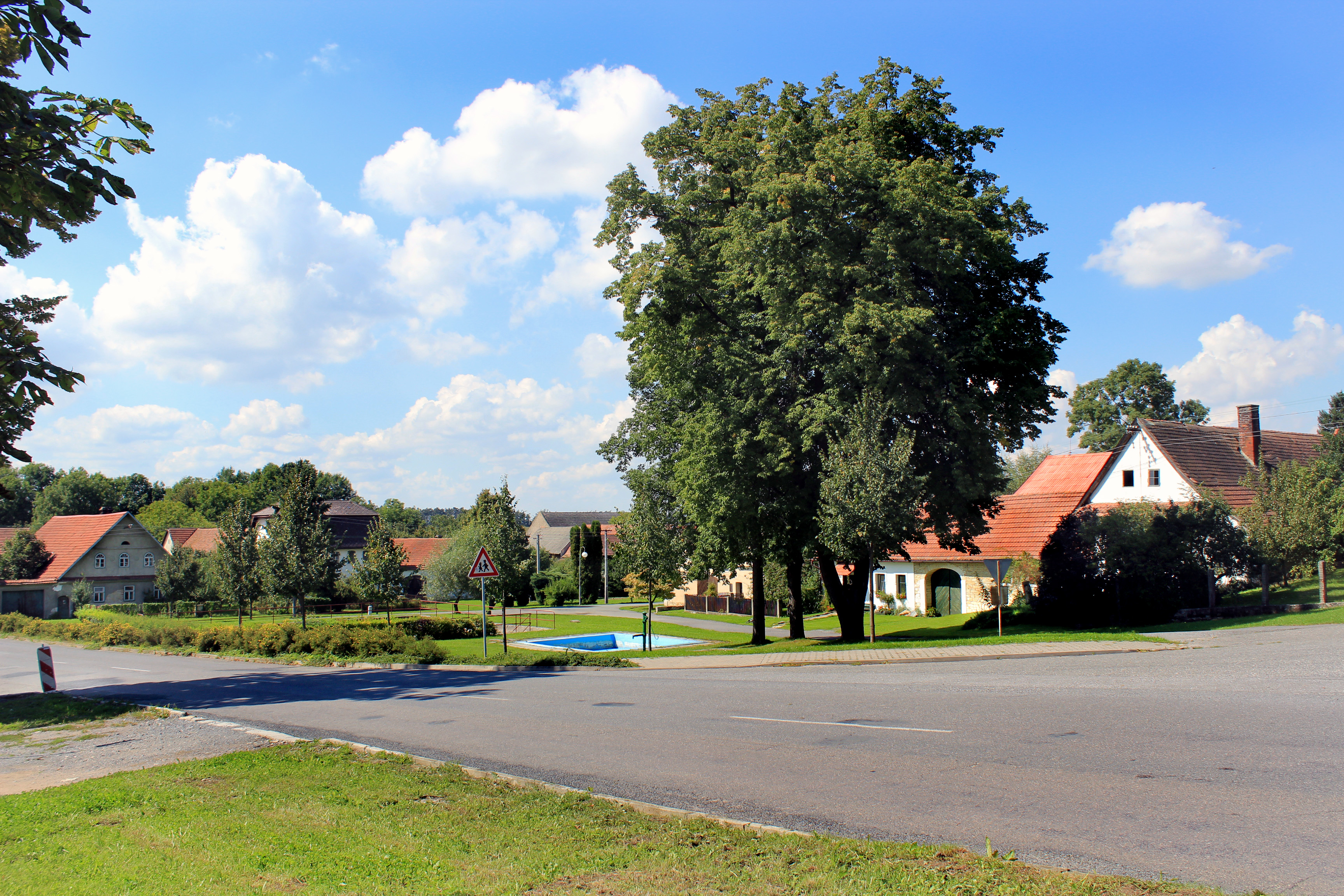
- Centre of Chotovice

- Flag Coat of arms

- Location in the Czech Republic
- Coordinates: 49°51′4″N 16°10′17″E
- Country: Czech Republic
- Region: Pardubice
- District: Svitavy
- First mentioned: 1350

Area
  - Total: 3.20 km^{2} (1.24 sq mi)
- Elevation: 449 m (1,473 ft)

Population (2026-01-01)
  - Total: 153
  - Density: 47.8/km^{2} (124/sq mi)
- Time zone: UTC+1 (CET)
  - Summer (DST): UTC+2 (CEST)
- Postal code: 570 01
- Website: www.chotovice.info

Chotovice is a municipality and village in Svitavy District in the Pardubice Region of the Czech Republic. It has about 200 inhabitants.

Chotovice lies approximately 24 kilometres (15 mi) north-west of Svitavy, 36 km (22 mi) south-east of Pardubice, and 129 km (80 mi) east of Prague.

== Demographics ==
Historical population
Year	Pop.	±%
1869	329	—
1880	316	−4.0%
1890	321	+1.6%
1900	325	+1.2%
1910	330	+1.5%
1921	321	−2.7%
1930	326	+1.6%
1950	224	−31.3%
1961	177	−21.0%
1970	168	−5.1%
1980	146	−13.1%
1991	117	−19.9%
2001	126	+7.7%
2011	133	+5.6%
2021	129	−3.0%
Source: Censuses
