= Malíkov =

- Municipality
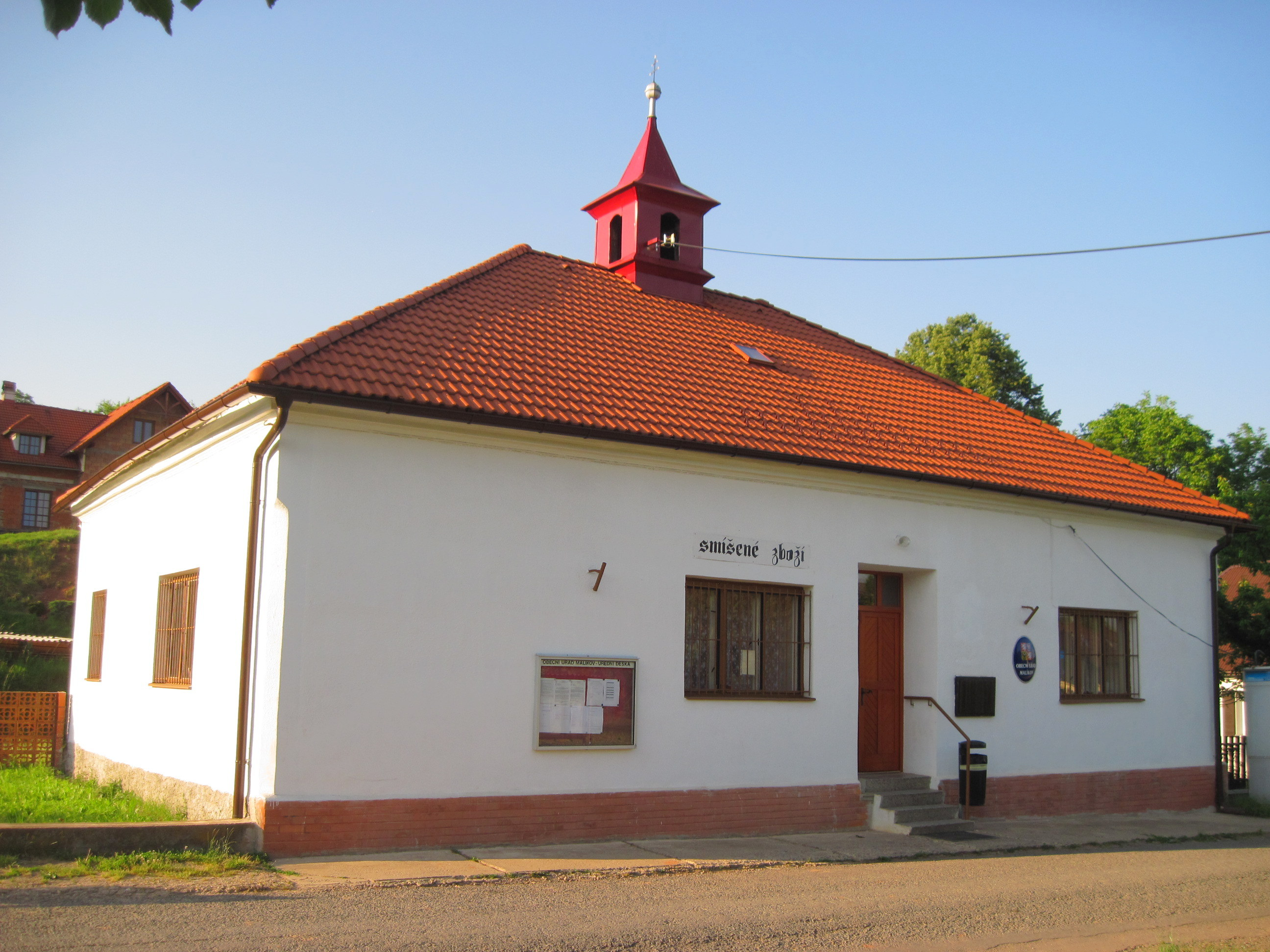
- Municipal office

- Location in the Czech Republic
- Coordinates: 49°43′52″N 16°41′43″E
- Country: Czech Republic
- Region: Pardubice
- District: Svitavy
- First mentioned: 1270

Area
  - Total: 4.11 km^{2} (1.59 sq mi)
- Elevation: 395 m (1,296 ft)

Population (2026-01-01)
  - Total: 105
  - Density: 25.5/km^{2} (66.2/sq mi)
- Time zone: UTC+1 (CET)
  - Summer (DST): UTC+2 (CEST)
- Postal code: 571 01
- Website: www.obecmalikov.cz

Malíkov is a municipality and village in Svitavy District in the Pardubice Region of the Czech Republic. It has about 100 inhabitants.

Malíkov lies approximately 16 kilometres (10 mi) east of Svitavy, 74 km (46 mi) south-east of Pardubice, and 167 km (104 mi) east of Prague.

== Demographics ==
Historical population
Year	Pop.	±%
1869	281	—
1880	267	−5.0%
1890	271	+1.5%
1900	265	−2.2%
1910	252	−4.9%
1921	247	−2.0%
1930	211	−14.6%
1950	164	−22.3%
1961	152	−7.3%
1970	107	−29.6%
1980	92	−14.0%
1991	90	−2.2%
2001	103	+14.4%
2011	116	+12.6%
2021	100	−13.8%
Source: Censuses
