= Bezděčí u Trnávky =

- Municipality
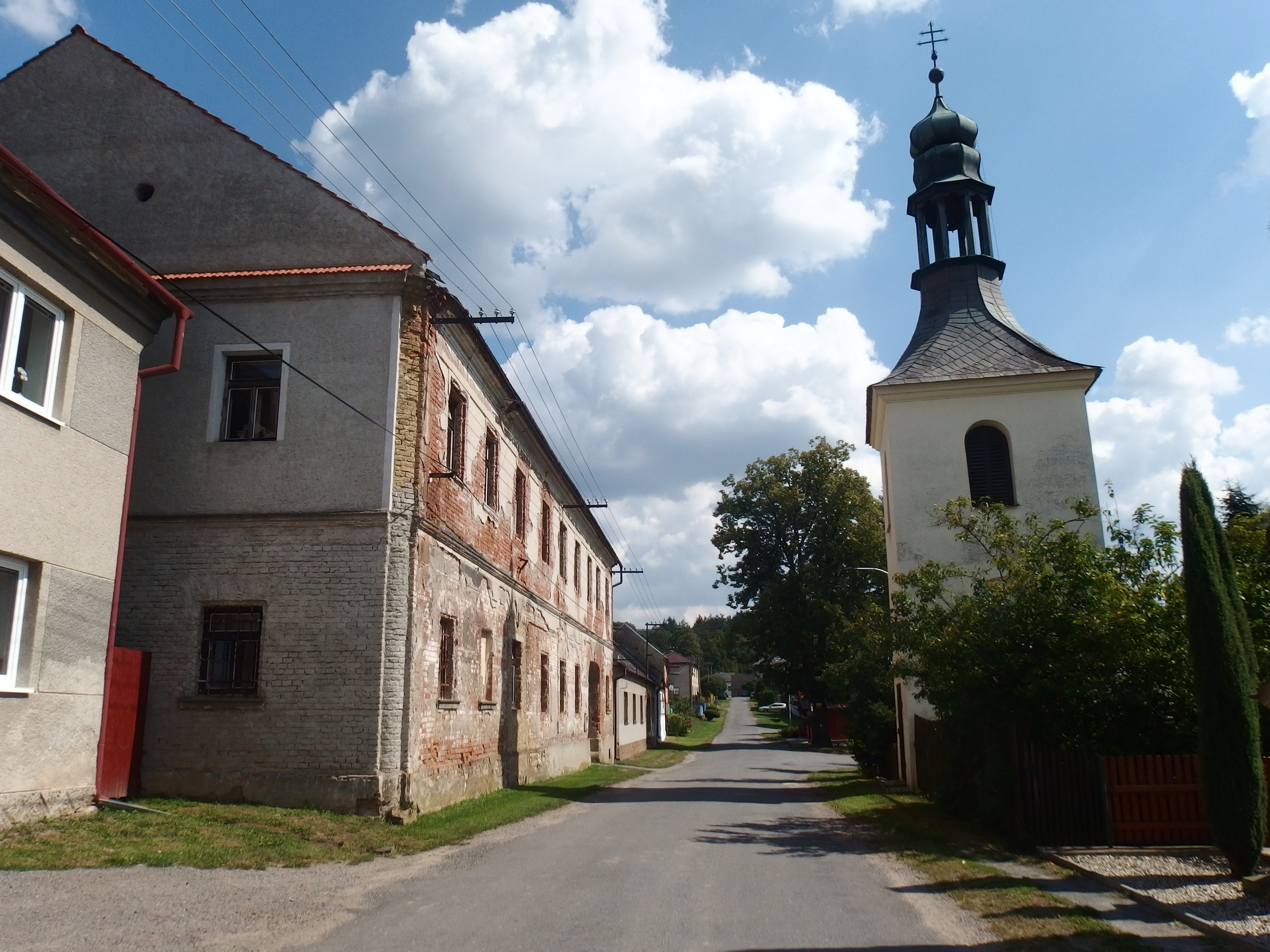
- Belfry in the centre of Bezděčí u Trnávky

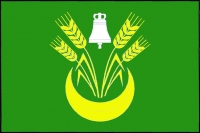
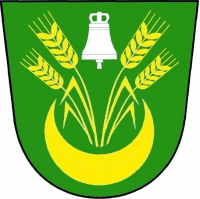
- Flag Coat of arms

- Location in the Czech Republic
- Coordinates: 49°41′33″N 16°45′49″E
- Country: Czech Republic
- Region: Pardubice
- District: Svitavy
- First mentioned: 1258

Area
  - Total: 6.99 km^{2} (2.70 sq mi)
- Elevation: 318 m (1,043 ft)

Population (2026-01-01)
  - Total: 181
  - Density: 25.9/km^{2} (67.1/sq mi)
- Time zone: UTC+1 (CET)
  - Summer (DST): UTC+2 (CEST)
- Postal codes: 569 43, 571 01
- Website: www.bezdeci-unerazka.cz

Bezděčí u Trnávky is a municipality and village in Svitavy District in the Pardubice Region of the Czech Republic. It has about 200 inhabitants.

Bezděčí u Trnávky lies approximately 23 kilometres (14 mi) east of Svitavy, 81 km (50 mi) south-east of Pardubice, and 174 km (108 mi) east of Prague.

== Administrative division ==
Bezděčí u Trnávky consists of two municipal parts (in brackets population according to the 2021 census):

- Bezděčí u Trnávky (128)
- Unerázka (39)

== Demographics ==
Historical population
Year	Pop.	±%
1869	365	—
1880	358	−1.9%
1890	367	+2.5%
1900	357	−2.7%
1910	362	+1.4%
1921	357	−1.4%
1930	343	−3.9%
1950	279	−18.7%
1961	276	−1.1%
1970	243	−12.0%
1980	224	−7.8%
1991	216	−3.6%
2001	238	+10.2%
2011	213	−10.5%
2021	167	−21.6%
Source: Censuses
