= Svitavy District =

Svitavy District Okres Svitavy
- District
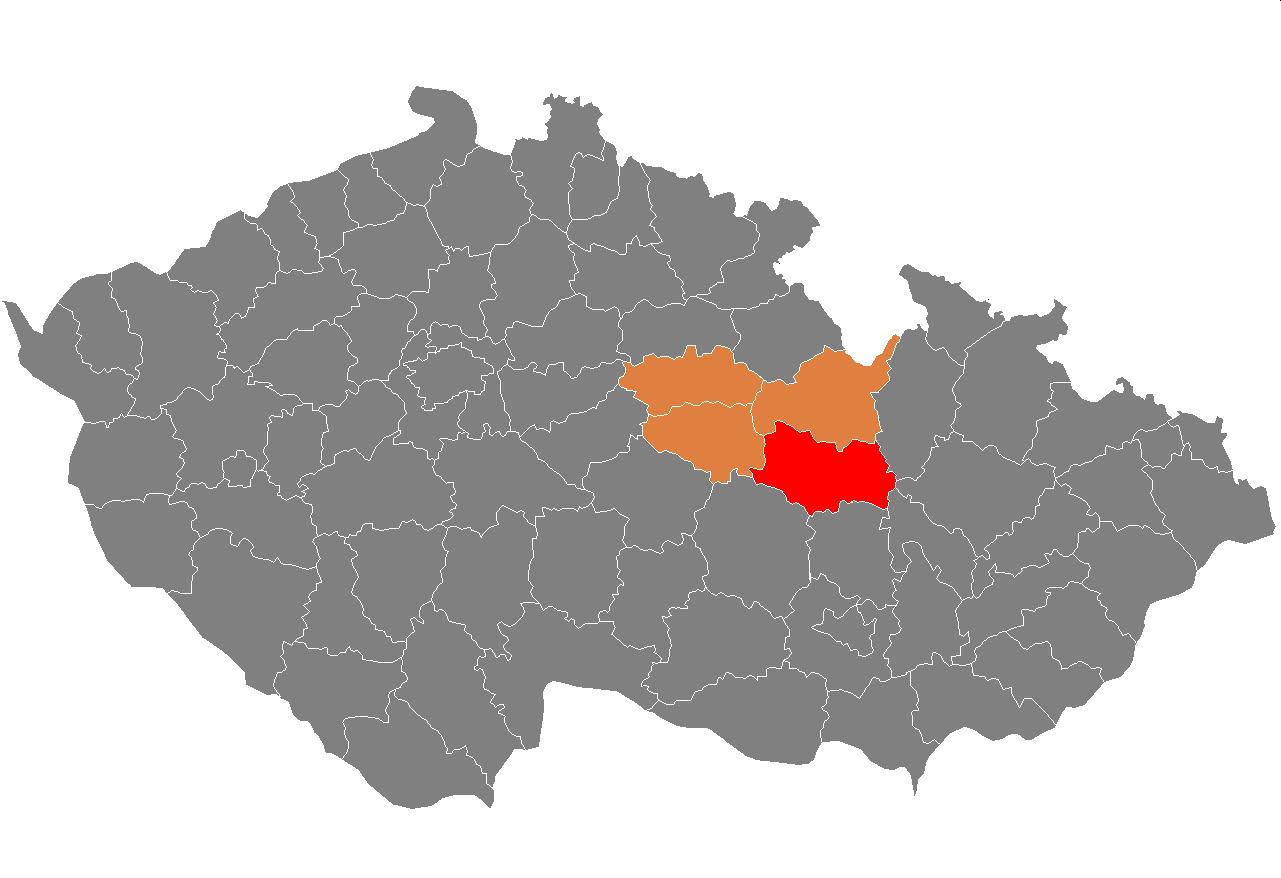
- Location in the Pardubice Region within the Czech Republic
- Coordinates: 49°52′N 15°54′E
- Country: Czech Republic
- Region: Pardubice
- Capital: Svitavy

Area
  - Total: 1,378.68 km^{2} (532.31 sq mi)

Population (2026)
  - Total: 104,459
  - Density: 75.7674/km^{2} (196.237/sq mi)
- Time zone: UTC+1 (CET)
  - Summer (DST): UTC+2 (CEST)
- Municipalities: 116
- * Towns: 7
- * Market towns: 2

Svitavy District (Czech: okres Svitavy) is a district in the Pardubice Region of the Czech Republic. Its capital is the town of Svitavy.

== Administrative division ==
Svitavy District is divided into four administrative districts of municipalities with extended competence: Svitavy, Litomyšl, Moravská Třebová and Polička.

=== List of municipalities ===
Towns are marked in bold and market towns in italics:

Banín – Bělá nad Svitavou – Bělá u Jevíčka – Benátky – Bezděčí u Trnávky – Biskupice – Bohuňov – Bohuňovice – Borová – Borušov – Březina – Březinky – Březiny – Březová nad Svitavou – Brněnec – Budislav – Bystré – Cerekvice nad Loučnou – Chmelík – Chornice – Chotovice – Chotěnov – Chrastavec – Čistá – Desná – Dlouhá Loučka – Dolní Újezd – Dětřichov – Dětřichov u Moravské Třebové – Gruna – Hartinkov – Hartmanice – Horky – Horní Újezd – Hradec nad Svitavou – Janov – Janůvky – Jaroměřice – Jarošov – Javorník – Jedlová – Jevíčko – Kamenec u Poličky – Kamenná Horka – Karle – Koclířov – Korouhev – Koruna – Křenov – Kukle – Kunčina – Květná – Lavičné – Linhartice – Litomyšl – Lubná – Makov – Malíkov – Městečko Trnávka – Mikuleč – Mladějov na Moravě – Moravská Třebová – Morašice – Nedvězí – Němčice – Nová Sídla – Nová Ves u Jarošova – Oldřiš – Opatov – Opatovec – Osík – Pohledy – Polička – Pomezí – Poříčí u Litomyšle – Pustá Kamenice – Pustá Rybná – Příluka – Radiměř – Radkov – Řídký – Rohozná – Rozhraní – Rozstání – Rudná – Rychnov na Moravě – Sádek – Sebranice – Sedliště – Široký Důl – Sklené – Slatina – Sloupnice – Staré Město – Stašov – Strakov – Študlov – Suchá Lhota – Svitavy – Svojanov – Telecí – Trpín – Trstěnice – Tržek – Třebařov – Újezdec – Útěchov – Vendolí – Vidlatá Seč – Víska u Jevíčka – Vítějeves – Vlčkov – Vranová Lhota – Vrážné – Vysoká – Želivsko

== Geography ==
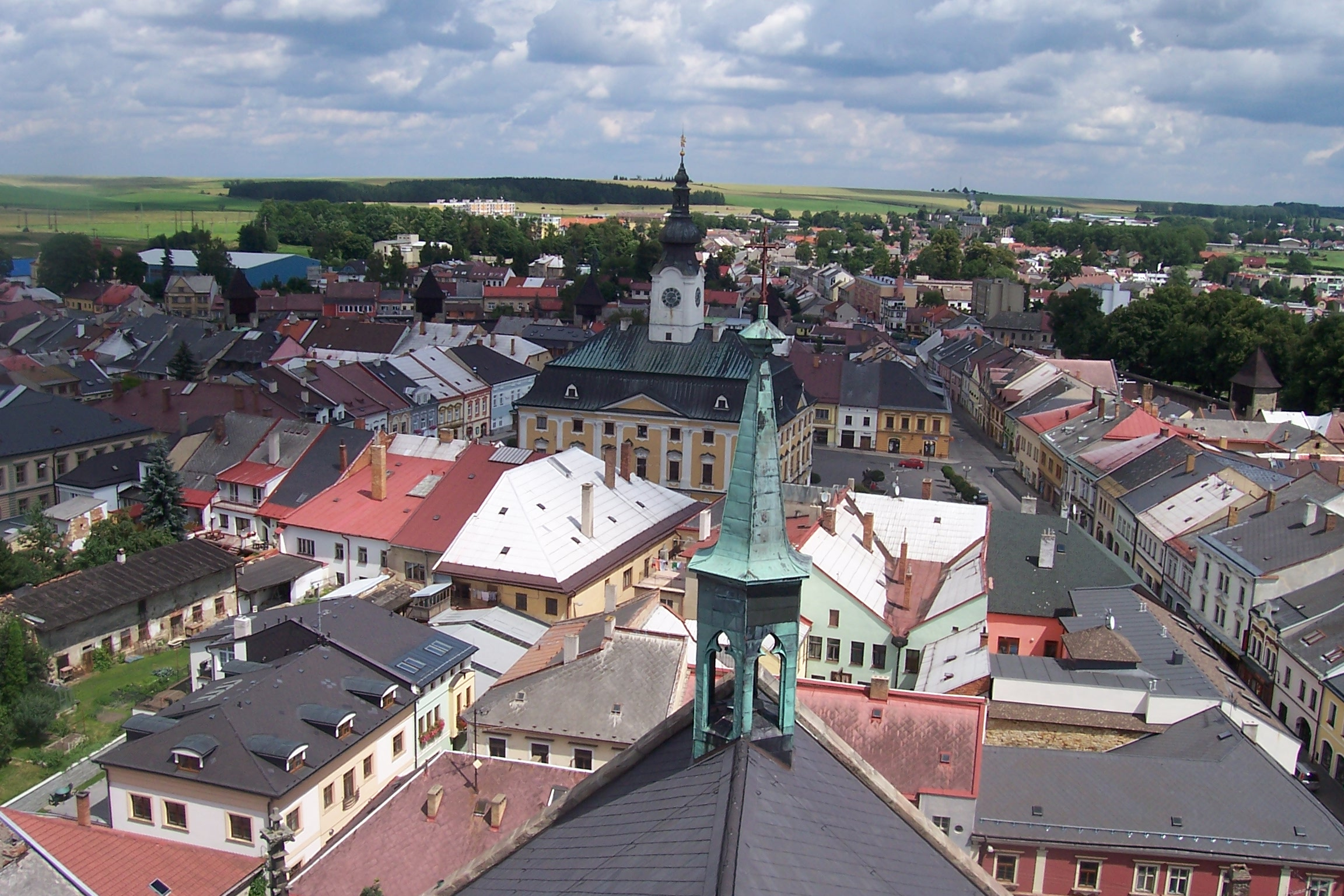
Polička and surrounding landscape

Svitavy District incorporates parts of historical lands of Bohemia and Moravia. From a total of 116 municipalities, 44 municipalities (including the town of Svitavy) are situated in Moravia, 67 municipalities in Bohemia, and five municipalities (Brněnec, Březová nad Svitavou, Kamenná Horka, Karle and Radiměř) lie in both lands.

The terrain is undulating to hilly. The territory extends into five geomorphological mesoregions: Svitavy Uplands (most of the territory), Upper Svratka Highlands (southwest), Orlické Foothills (a strip from northeast to southeast), Zábřeh Highlands (east) and Boskovice Furrow (a small part in the southeast). The highest point of the district is the hill Bubnovaný kopec in Pustá Rybná with an elevation of 780 m (2,560 ft), the lowest point is the river bed of the Loučná in Cerekvice nad Loučnou at 278 m (912 ft).

From the total district area of 1,378.7 km^{2} (532.3 sq mi), agricultural land occupies 828.5 km^{2} (319.9 sq mi), forests occupy 435.4 km^{2} (168.1 sq mi), and water area occupies 11.5 km^{2} (4.4 sq mi). Forests cover 31.6% of the district's area.

The district is divided into drainage basins of the Elbe and the Danube. The main rivers in the district are the Svitava (central part of the district), Svratka (southeastern part), Moravská Sázava (briefly in the northeastern part), Třebůvka (eastern part), Třebovka and Loučná (both in the northwestern part). The first four rivers comprise part of the Danube basin, while the latter two comprise part of the Elbe basin. The largest body of water in the district is the fishpond Hvězda with an area of 82 ha (200 acres).

The protected landscape area of Žďárské vrchy extends into the district in the west.

== Demographics ==
Historical population

Year	Pop.	±%
1869	142,481	—
1880	146,643	+2.9%
1890	150,006	+2.3%
1900	152,558	+1.7%
1910	153,390	+0.5%

Year	Pop.	±%
1921	143,472	−6.5%
1930	145,551	+1.4%
1950	104,162	−28.4%
1961	108,757	+4.4%
1970	105,095	−3.4%

Year	Pop.	±%
1980	107,544	+2.3%
1991	105,134	−2.2%
2001	105,442	+0.3%
2011	103,245	−2.1%
2021	100,740	−2.4%

Source: Censuses

=== Most populous municipalities ===
Name	Population	Area (km^{2})
Svitavy	16,041	31
Litomyšl	10,411	33
Moravská Třebová	9,418	42
Polička	9,035	33
Jevíčko	2,837	23
Dolní Újezd	1,958	20
Sloupnice	1,829	28
Hradec nad Svitavou	1,663	25
Březová nad Svitavou	1,578	13
Bystré	1,561	14

== Economy ==
The largest employers with headquarters in Svitavy District and at least 500 employees are:

Economic entity	Location	Number of employees	Main activity
Saint-Gobain Adfors CZ	Litomyšl	2,000–2,499	Manufacture of glass fibres
Mach drůbež	Litomyšl	500–999	Animal production
Velkoobchod Orion	Litomyšl	500–999	Wholesale trade
Ravensburger Karton	Polička	500–999	Manufacture of toys and games

== Transport ==
There are no motorways passing through the district. The most important road is the I/35 road (part of the European route E442), which replaces the unfinished section of the D35 motorway from Olomouc to the Hradec Králové Region.

== Sights ==
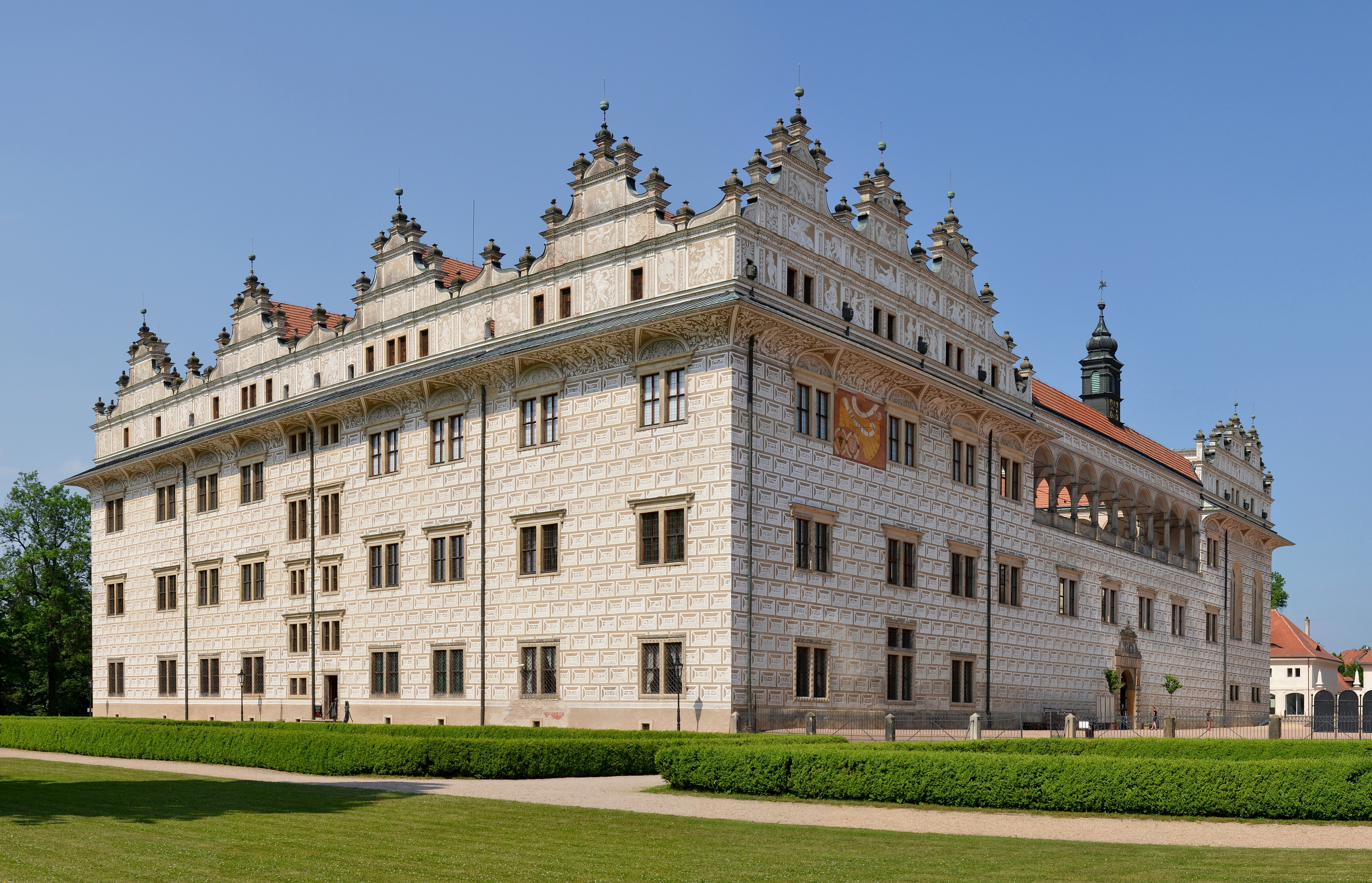
Litomyšl Castle

The Litomyšl Castle was designated a UNESCO World Heritage Site in 1999 because it is an outstanding example of an arcaded Renaissance residence with Baroque elements.

The most important monuments in the district, protected as national cultural monuments, are:

- Litomyšl Castle
- Town hall in Polička
- Church of Saint James the Great with the birthplace of Bohuslav Martinů in Polička
- Homestead No. 16 in Telecí
- Homestead No. 171 in Čistá
- Pilgrimage area with the Church of the Exaltation of the Holy Cross on Kalvárie Hill in Jaroměřice
- Moravská Třebová Castle

The best-preserved settlements, protected as monument reservations and monument zones, are:

- Litomyšl (monument reservation)
- Moravská Třebová (monument reservation)
- Bystré
- Jevíčko
- Polička
- Svitavy
- Telecí

The most visited tourist destination is the Svojanov Castle.
