= Suchá Lhota =

- Municipality
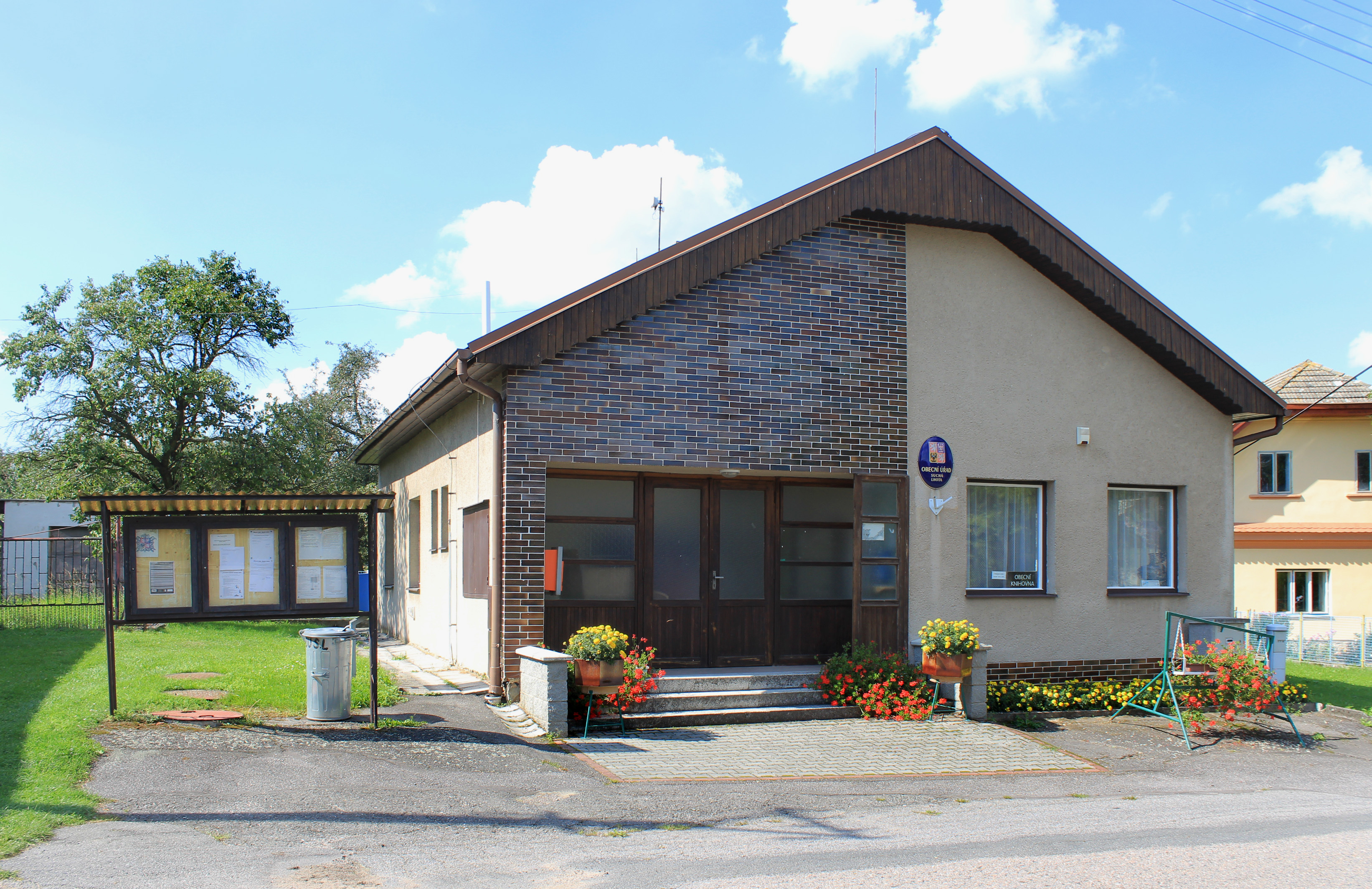
- Municipal office

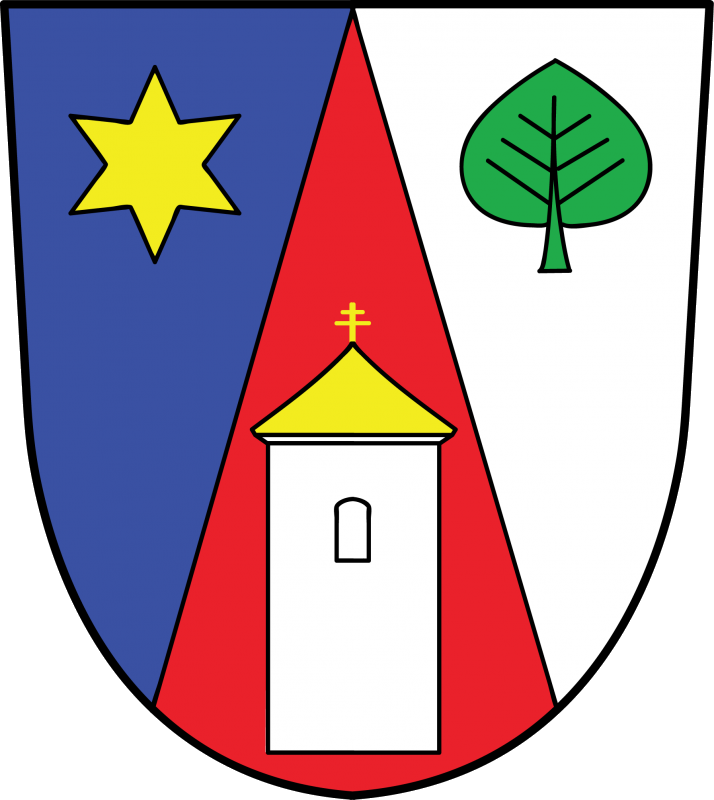
- Flag Coat of arms

- Location in the Czech Republic
- Coordinates: 49°52′38″N 16°10′25″E
- Country: Czech Republic
- Region: Pardubice
- District: Svitavy
- First mentioned: 1559

Area
  - Total: 2.19 km^{2} (0.85 sq mi)
- Elevation: 426 m (1,398 ft)

Population (2026-01-01)
  - Total: 83
  - Density: 38/km^{2} (98/sq mi)
- Time zone: UTC+1 (CET)
  - Summer (DST): UTC+2 (CEST)
- Postal code: 570 01
- Website: www.suchalhota.cz

Suchá Lhota is a municipality and village in Svitavy District in the Pardubice Region of the Czech Republic. It has about 80 inhabitants.

Suchá Lhota lies approximately 26 kilometres (16 mi) north-west of Svitavy, 34 km (21 mi) south-east of Pardubice, and 128 km (80 mi) east of Prague.

== Demographics ==
Historical population
Year	Pop.	±%
1869	198	—
1880	230	+16.2%
1890	240	+4.3%
1900	234	−2.5%
1910	225	−3.8%
1921	228	+1.3%
1930	208	−8.8%
1950	140	−32.7%
1961	131	−6.4%
1970	111	−15.3%
1980	104	−6.3%
1991	98	−5.8%
2001	90	−8.2%
2011	84	−6.7%
2021	91	+8.3%
Source: Censuses
