= Chornice =

- Municipality
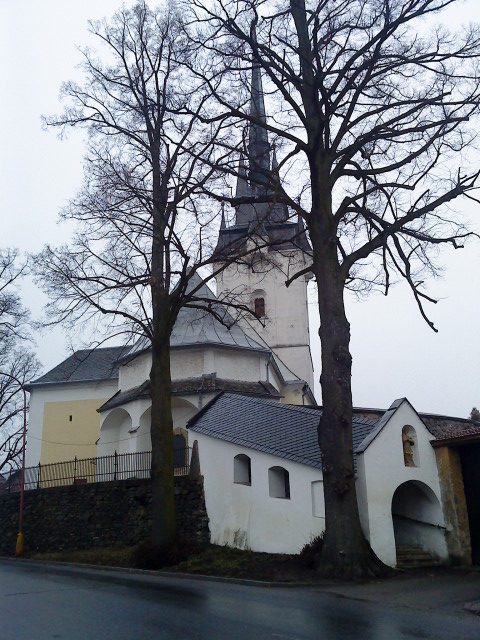
- Church of Saint Lawrence

- Location in the Czech Republic
- Coordinates: 49°40′3″N 16°44′34″E
- Country: Czech Republic
- Region: Pardubice
- District: Svitavy
- First mentioned: 1258

Area
  - Total: 14.23 km^{2} (5.49 sq mi)
- Elevation: 322 m (1,056 ft)

Population (2026-01-01)
  - Total: 846
  - Density: 59.5/km^{2} (154/sq mi)
- Time zone: UTC+1 (CET)
  - Summer (DST): UTC+2 (CEST)
- Postal code: 569 42
- Website: www.obecchornice.cz

Chornice (German: Kornitz) is a municipality and village in Svitavy District in the Pardubice Region of the Czech Republic. It has about 800 inhabitants.

Chornice lies approximately 23 kilometres (14 mi) south-east of Svitavy, 81 km (50 mi) south-east of Pardubice, and 174 km (108 mi) east of Prague.

== Demographics ==
Historical population
Year	Pop.	±%
1869	972	—
1880	951	−2.2%
1890	1,021	+7.4%
1900	1,001	−2.0%
1910	1,004	+0.3%
1921	1,055	+5.1%
1930	1,070	+1.4%
1950	892	−16.6%
1961	910	+2.0%
1970	932	+2.4%
1980	851	−8.7%
1991	825	−3.1%
2001	830	+0.6%
2011	825	−0.6%
2021	796	−3.5%
Source: Censuses

== Notable people ==
- František Mašlaň (1933–2026), ice hockey player
