= Borušov =

- Municipality
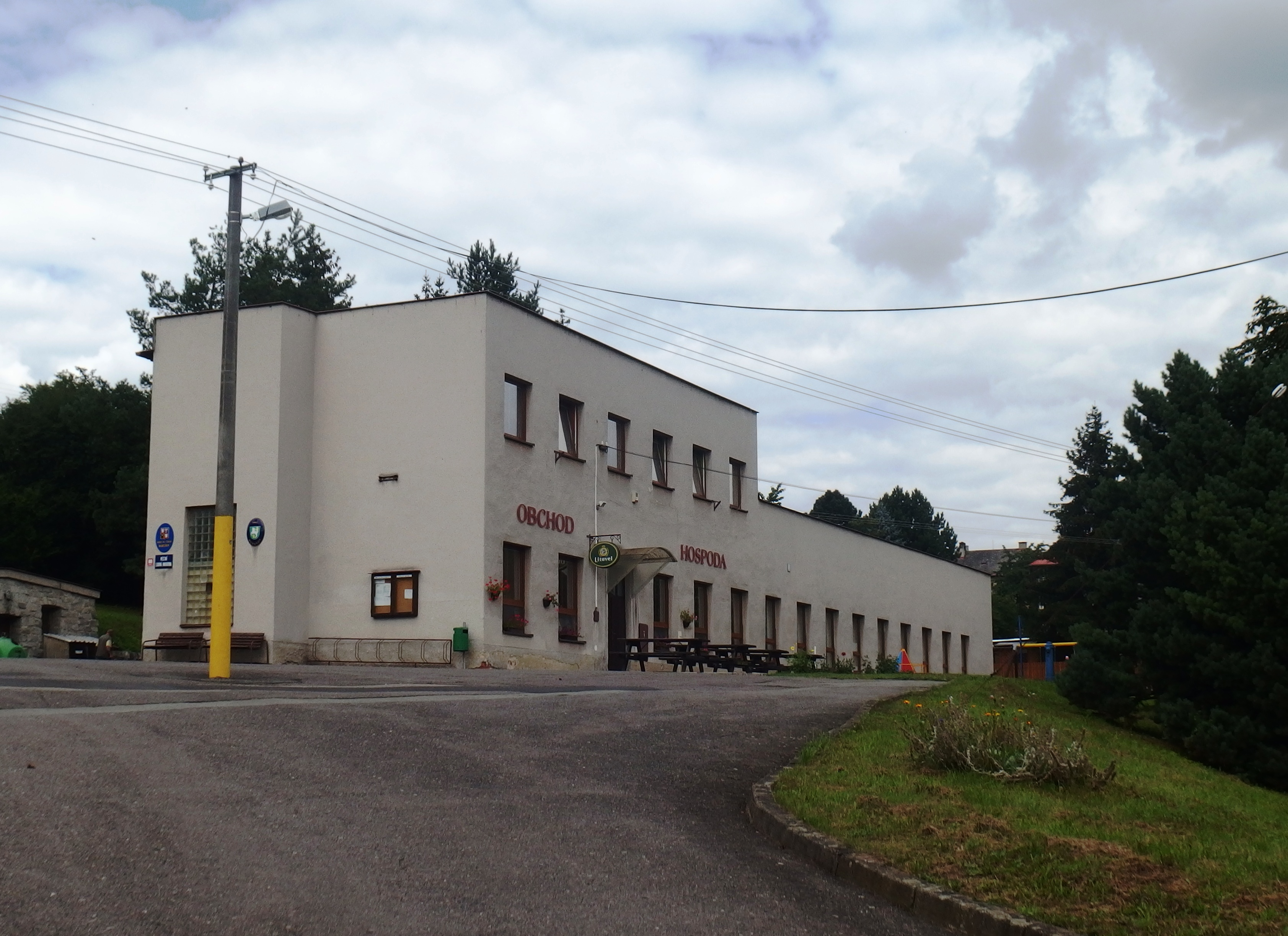
- Municipal office

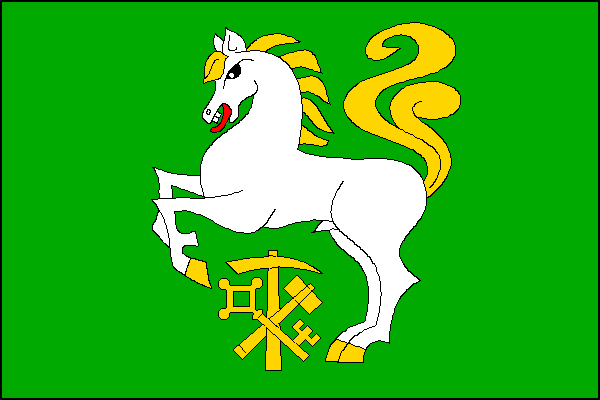
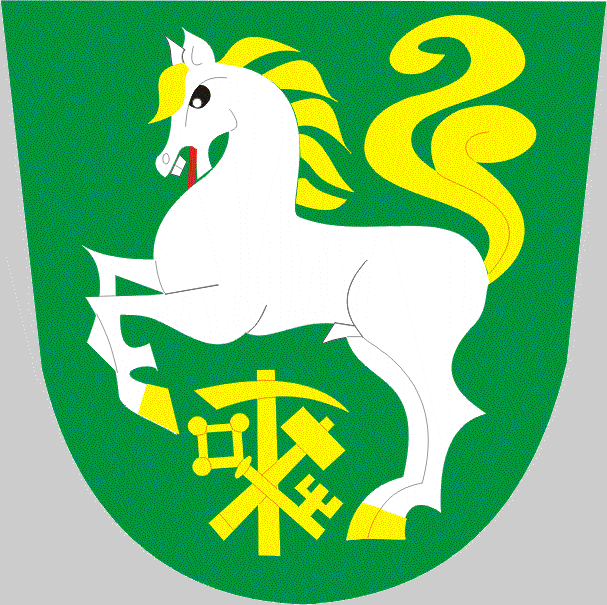
- Flag Coat of arms

- Location in the Czech Republic
- Coordinates: 49°46′33″N 16°44′9″E
- Country: Czech Republic
- Region: Pardubice
- District: Svitavy
- First mentioned: 1398

Area
  - Total: 11.07 km^{2} (4.27 sq mi)
- Elevation: 405 m (1,329 ft)

Population (2026-01-01)
  - Total: 178
  - Density: 16.1/km^{2} (41.6/sq mi)
- Time zone: UTC+1 (CET)
  - Summer (DST): UTC+2 (CEST)
- Postal code: 571 01
- Website: www.borusov.cz

Borušov is a municipality and village in Svitavy District in the Pardubice Region of the Czech Republic. It has about 200 inhabitants.

Borušov lies approximately 21 kilometres (13 mi) east of Svitavy, 75 km (47 mi) east of Pardubice, and 170 km (110 mi) east of Prague.

== Administrative division ==
Borušov consists of two municipal parts (in brackets population according to the 2021 census):

- Borušov (145)
- Svojanov (20)

== Demographics ==
Historical population
Year	Pop.	±%
1869	587	—
1880	599	+2.0%
1890	611	+2.0%
1900	583	−4.6%
1910	500	−14.2%
1921	454	−9.2%
1930	455	+0.2%
1950	277	−39.1%
1961	256	−7.6%
1970	234	−8.6%
1980	199	−15.0%
1991	160	−19.6%
2001	163	+1.9%
2011	165	+1.2%
2021	165	+0.0%
Source: Censuses
