= Javorník (Svitavy District) =

- Municipality
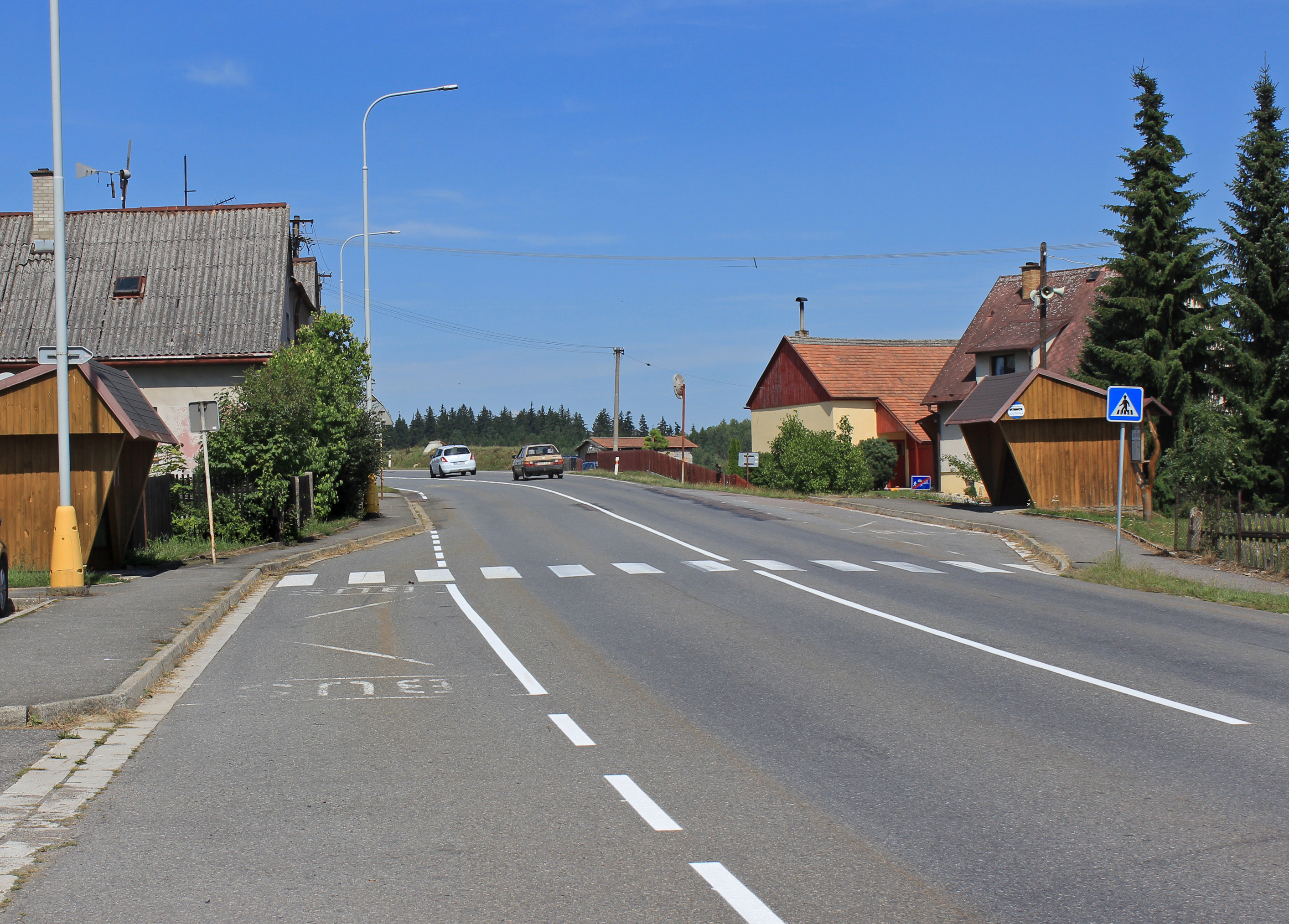
- Main road

- Flag Coat of arms

- Location in the Czech Republic
- Coordinates: 49°46′58″N 16°25′39″E
- Country: Czech Republic
- Region: Pardubice
- District: Svitavy
- First mentioned: 1317

Area
  - Total: 5.70 km^{2} (2.20 sq mi)
- Elevation: 478 m (1,568 ft)

Population (2026-01-01)
  - Total: 428
  - Density: 75.1/km^{2} (194/sq mi)
- Time zone: UTC+1 (CET)
  - Summer (DST): UTC+2 (CEST)
- Postal code: 568 02
- Website: www.svitavskoweb.cz/javornik

Javorník (German: Mohren) is a municipality and village in Svitavy District in the Pardubice Region of the Czech Republic. It has about 400 inhabitants.

== Demographics ==
Historical population
Year	Pop.	±%
1869	419	—
1880	473	+12.9%
1890	495	+4.7%
1900	476	−3.8%
1910	470	−1.3%
1921	426	−9.4%
1930	432	+1.4%
1950	347	−19.7%
1961	370	+6.6%
1970	398	+7.6%
1980	339	−14.8%
1991	294	−13.3%
2001	335	+13.9%
2011	401	+19.7%
2021	402	+0.2%
Source: Censuses
