= Makov (Svitavy District) =

- Municipality
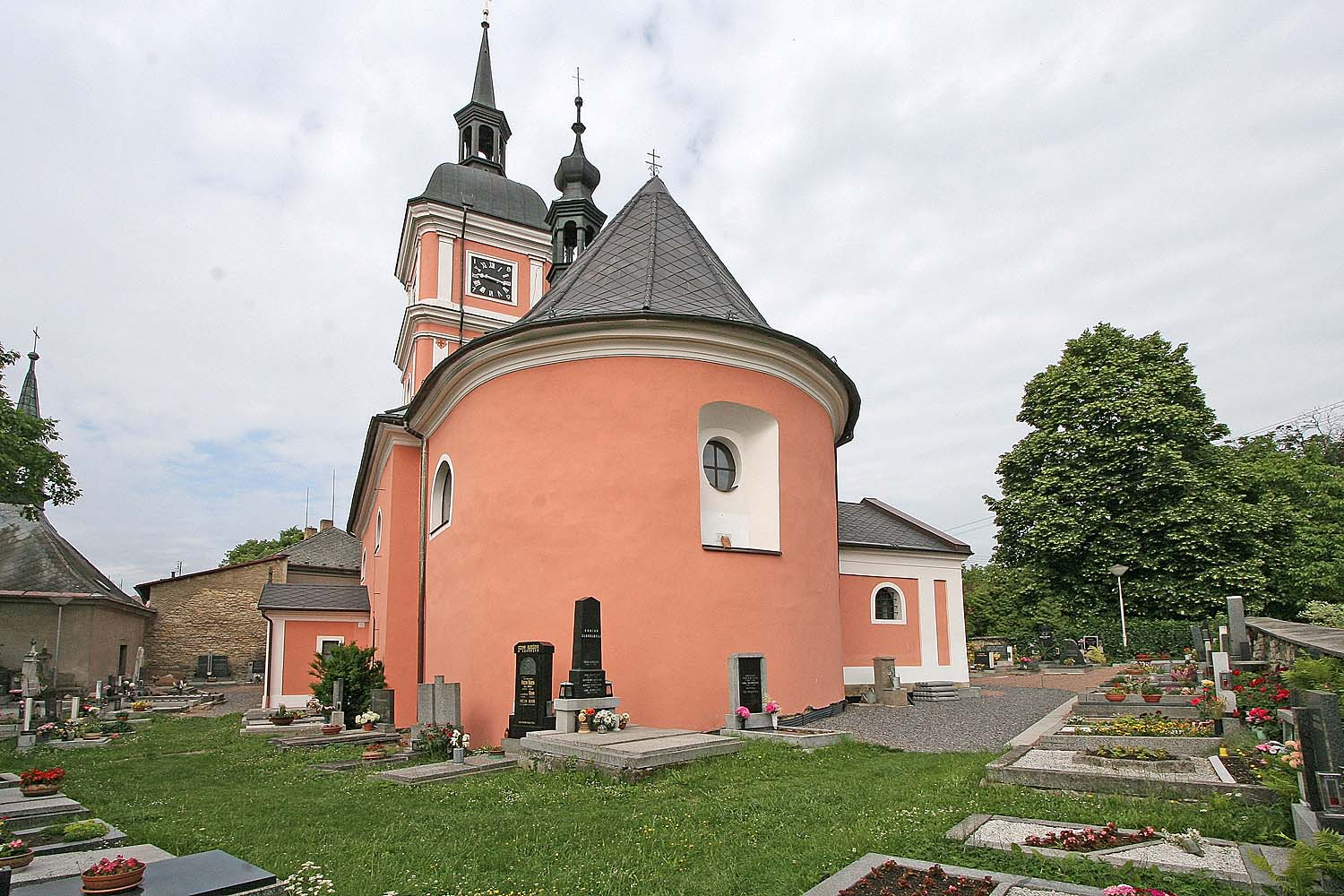
- Church of Saint Vitus

- Flag Coat of arms

- Location in the Czech Republic
- Coordinates: 49°51′18″N 16°11′28″E
- Country: Czech Republic
- Region: Pardubice
- District: Svitavy
- First mentioned: 1349

Area
  - Total: 6.90 km^{2} (2.66 sq mi)
- Elevation: 430 m (1,410 ft)

Population (2026-01-01)
  - Total: 342
  - Density: 49.6/km^{2} (128/sq mi)
- Time zone: UTC+1 (CET)
  - Summer (DST): UTC+2 (CEST)
- Postal code: 570 01
- Website: www.obecmakov.cz

Makov is a municipality and village in Svitavy District in the Pardubice Region of the Czech Republic. It has about 300 inhabitants.

Makov lies approximately 23 kilometres (14 mi) north-west of Svitavy, 36 km (22 mi) south-east of Pardubice, and 130 km (81 mi) east of Prague.

== Demographics ==
Historical population
| Year | Pop. | ±% |
|---|---|---|
| 1869 | 659 | — |
| 1880 | 664 | +0.8% |
| 1890 | 628 | −5.4% |
| 1900 | 627 | −0.2% |
| 1910 | 618 | −1.4% |
| 1921 | 582 | −5.8% |
| 1930 | 536 | −7.9% |
| 1950 | 419 | −21.8% |
| 1961 | 408 | −2.6% |
| 1970 | 368 | −9.8% |
| 1980 | 324 | −12.0% |
| 1991 | 343 | +5.9% |
| 2001 | 349 | +1.7% |
| 2011 | 321 | −8.0% |
| 2021 | 305 | −5.0% |
Source: Censuses
