= Březiny =

- Municipality
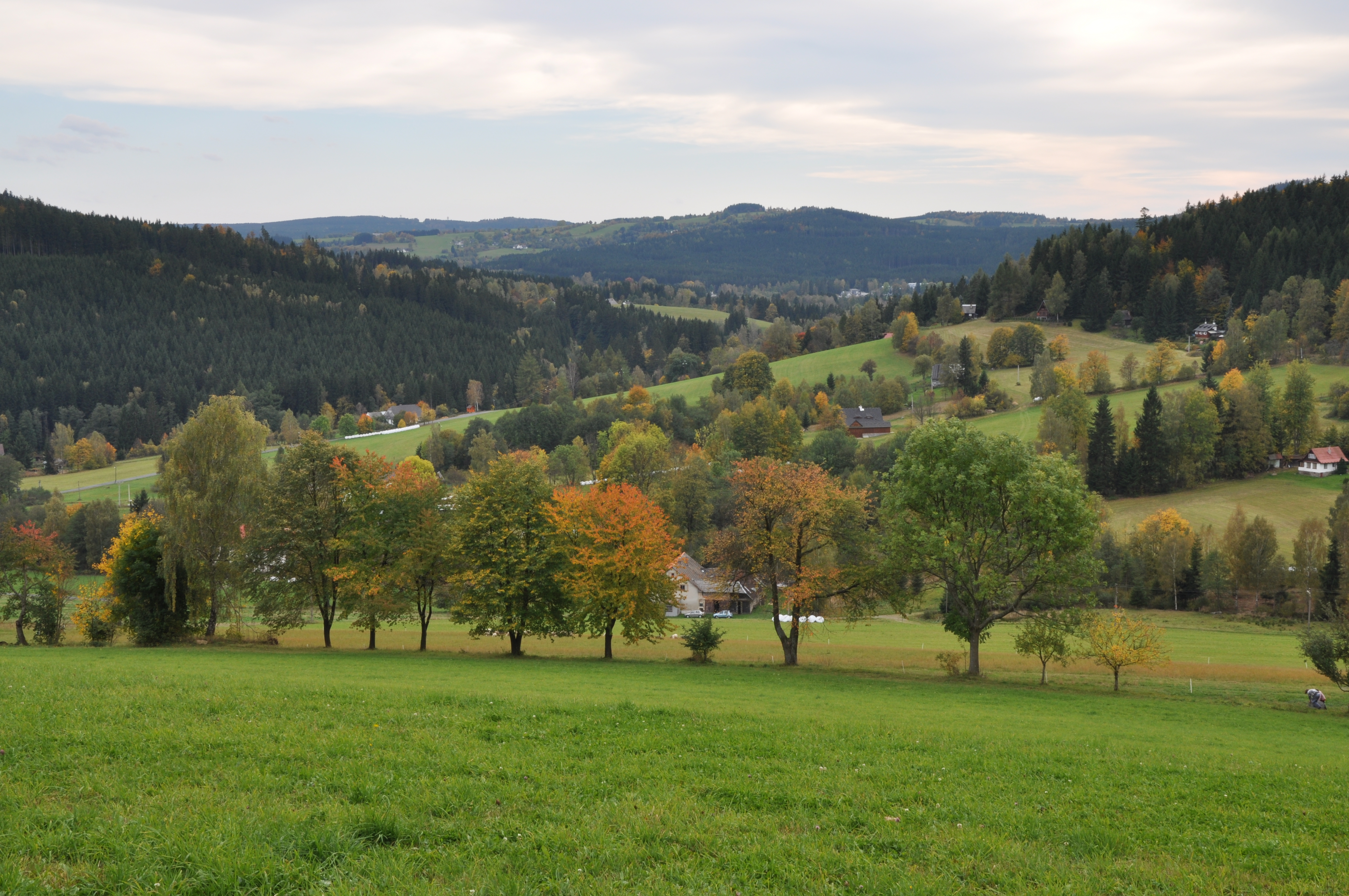
- General view

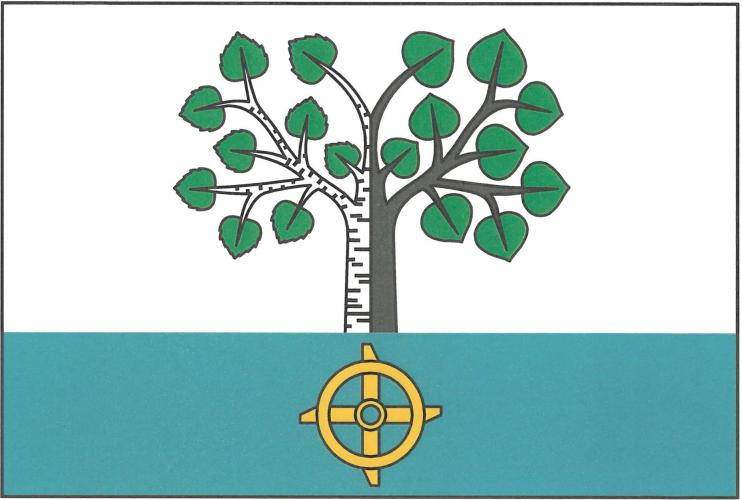
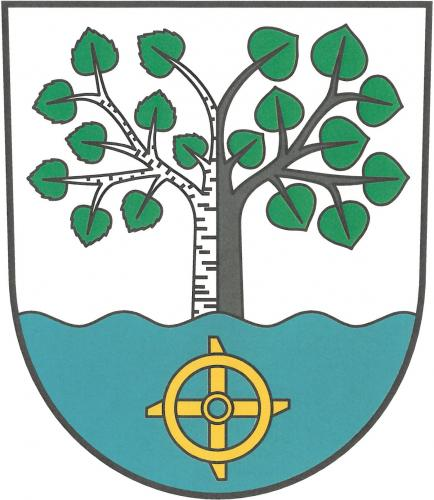
- Flag Coat of arms

- Location in the Czech Republic
- Coordinates: 49°41′26″N 16°7′5″E
- Country: Czech Republic
- Region: Pardubice
- District: Svitavy
- First mentioned: 1702

Area
  - Total: 7.20 km^{2} (2.78 sq mi)
- Elevation: 605 m (1,985 ft)

Population (2026-01-01)
  - Total: 138
  - Density: 19.2/km^{2} (49.6/sq mi)
- Time zone: UTC+1 (CET)
  - Summer (DST): UTC+2 (CEST)
- Postal code: 572 01
- Website: www.breziny.net

Březiny is a municipality and village in Svitavy District in the Pardubice Region of the Czech Republic. It has about 100 inhabitants.

Březiny lies approximately 27 kilometres (17 mi) west of Svitavy, 45 km (28 mi) south-east of Pardubice, and 129 km (80 mi) east of Prague.

== Demographics ==
Historical population
Year	Pop.	±%
1869	715	—
1880	605	−15.4%
1890	552	−8.8%
1900	546	−1.1%
1910	539	−1.3%
1921	446	−17.3%
1930	574	+28.7%
1950	291	−49.3%
1961	262	−10.0%
1970	198	−24.4%
1980	163	−17.7%
1991	146	−10.4%
2001	139	−4.8%
2011	150	+7.9%
2021	143	−4.7%
Source: Censuses
