= Gorica =

Gorica (small hill) is Slavic toponym that may refer to:

== Settlements ==
In Albania:

- Goricë, a village in Dropull i Poshtëm, Albania
- Korçë, Горица in Slavic

In Bosnia and Herzegovina:

- Gorica, Čapljina
- Gorica, Grude
- Gorica, Konjic
- Gorica, Prozor
- Gorica (Sarajevo), a neighborhood of Sarajevo
- Gorica (Zenica), a village in the city of Zenica

In Croatia:

- Gorica, Karlovac County, a village near Duga Resa
- Gorica, hamlet of Severin na Kupi
- Gorica, Koprivnica-Križevci County, a village near Rasinja
- Gorica, Pag, a village on the island of Pag island
- Gorica, Zadar County, a village near Sukošan
- Gorica, a hamlet of Sutivanac, near Barban, Istria
- Velika Gorica
- Mala Gorica, Sisak-Moslavina County, a village near Petrinja
- Mala Gorica, Zagreb County, a village near Sveta Nedelja
- Gorica Jamnička, a village near Pisarovina
- Gorica Lipnička, a village near Lipnik and Ribnik
- Gorica Miholečka, a village near Miholec and Sveti Petar Orehovec
- Gorica Skradska, a village near Skrad
- Gorica Svetojanska, a village near Jastrebarsko
- Gorica Valpovačka, a village near Valpovo

In Italy:

- Gorizia (Gorica)

In Hungary:

- Gorica, a village part of Bükkösd

In Montenegro:

- Gorica, Danilovgrad, a village in the Danilovgrad Municipality

In Serbia:

- Gorica (neighborhood), a neighborhood of Sremčica

In Slovenia:

- Gorica, Kočevske Poljane, a hamlet of Kočevske Poljane in the Municipality of Kočevske Poljane
- Gorica, Puconci, a settlement in the Municipality of Puconci
- Gorica pri Dobjem, a settlement in the Municipality of Dobje (known as Gorica until 1953)
- Gorica pri Oplotnici, a settlement in the Municipality of Oplotnica
- Gorica pri Raztezu, a settlement in the Municipality of Krško (known as Gorica until 1953)
- Gorica pri Slivnici, a settlement in the Municipality of Šentjur (known as Gorica until 1953)
- Gorica pri Šmartnem, a settlement in the Municipality of Celje (known as Gorica until 1953)
- Ivančna Gorica, a settlement and municipality
- Nova Gorica, a settlement and municipality
- Vinska Gorica, a settlement in the Municipality of Dobrna (known as Gorica until 1953)
- Zaloška Gorica, a settlement in the Municipality of Žalec (known as Gorica until 1953)

== Uplands ==
- Gorica Hill, the namesake of Podgorica, Montenegro
- Gorica Plateau, Slovenia, see Tolmin

== Other ==
- HNK Gorica, a Croatian football club
- KK Gorica, a Croatian basketball club based in Velika Gorica
- ND Gorica, a Slovenian football club
- Radio Gorica, Montenegro

== See also ==
- Goritsa (disambiguation), Bulgarian cognate
- Roman Catholic Archdiocese of Gorizia, an archdiocese of the Roman Catholic church in Italy
- Gorice (disambiguation)
- Hořice (disambiguation), Czech variant of Gorica
- Horka (disambiguation), Czech variant of Gorica
