= Horka =

Horka may refer to:

== Places ==
=== Czech Republic ===
- Horka (Chrudim District), a municipality and village in the Pardubice Region
- Horka I, a municipality and village in the Central Bohemian Region
- Horka II, a municipality and village in the Central Bohemian Region
- Horka, a village and part of Bakov nad Jizerou in the Central Bohemian Region
- Horka, a village and part of Evaň in the Ústí nad Labem Region
- Horka, a village and part of Nový Kostel in the Karlovy Vary Region
- Horka, a village and part of Přišimasy in the Central Bohemian Region
- Horka, a village and part of Proseč pod Ještědem in the Liberec Region
- Horka nad Moravou, a municipality and village in the Olomouc Region
- Horka u Staré Paky, a municipality and village in the Liberec Region
- Kamenná Horka, a municipality and village in the Pardubice Region

=== Germany ===
- Horka, Saxony, a municipality in Germany

=== Slovakia ===
- Hôrka, a municipality and village in the Prešov Region
- Hôrka nad Váhom, a municipality and village in the Trenčín Region

== Other uses ==
- Horká, the feminine form of the Czech and Slovak surname Horký
- Ludmila Hořká, pseudonym of Marie Šindelářová (1892–1966), Czech ethnographer, writer and poet
- Horka (title) or harka, a political or military title used by Magyar tribes during the 9th century

== See also ==
- Horky (disambiguation)
