= Kladruby =

Kladruby may refer to places in the Czech Republic:

- Kladruby (Benešov District), a municipality and village in the Central Bohemian Region
- Kladruby (Rokycany District), a municipality and village in the Plzeň Region
- Kladruby (Strakonice District), a municipality and village in the South Bohemian Region
- Kladruby (Tachov District), a town in the Plzeň Region
- Kladruby (Teplice District), a municipality and village in the Ústí nad Labem Region
- Kladruby, a village and part of Chlumec nad Cidlinou in the Hradec Králové Region
- Kladruby, a village and part of Dolní Hořice in the South Bohemian Region
- Kladruby, a village and part of Libice nad Doubravou in the Vysočina Region
- Kladruby, a village and part of Teplá in the Karlovy Vary Region
- Kladruby nad Labem, a municipality and village in the Pardubice Region
- Ovesné Kladruby, a municipality and village in the Karlovy Vary Region

== See also ==
- Kladeruby
- Kladeruby nad Oslavou
- Kladruber
