= Horky =

Horky may refer to:

== Places in the Czech Republic ==
- Horky (Kutná Hora District), a municipality and village in the Central Bohemian Region
- Horky (Svitavy District), a municipality and village in the Pardubice Region
- Horky, a village and part of Dubá in the Liberec Region
- Horky, a village and part of Frýdštejn in the Liberec Region
- Horky, a village and part of Tábor in the South Bohemian Region
- Horky, a village and part of Želetava in the Vysočina Region
- Horky nad Jizerou, a municipality and village in the Central Bohemian Region
- Kostelecké Horky, a municipality and village in the Hradec Králové Region

== Other ==
- 3137 Horky, an asteroid
- Hôrky, a municipality and village in Slovakia
- Horký, surname
