= Šindelář =

Šindelář (feminine Šindelářová) is a Czech surname, that is derived from the German word "Schindel" which means "shingle". Notable people include:

- Charles Sindelar, American illustrator
- Elijah Sindelar
- Filip Šindelář, Czech ice hockey player
- Greg Sindelar, American nonprofit executive
- Jakub Šindelář, Czech handball player
- Jan Šindelář, Czech bobsledder
- Joan Sindelar, American baseball player
- Joey Sindelar, American golfer
- Lenka Šindelářová, Czech historian
- Marie Šindelářová, Czechoslovak ethnographer
- Marie Voříšková née Šindelářová (1907–1987), Czech writer
- Martin Šindelář
- Matthias Sindelar, Austrian footballer
- Paul Sindelar, American professor
- Petr Šindelář, Czech snowboarder
- Ulrike Sindelar-Pachowsky
