= Gorice =

Gorice (pronounced [ɡɔˈɾiːtsɛ]) may refer to:

- Gorice, Sanski Most, a village in Bosnia
- Gorice, Brčko, a village in Bosnia
- Gorice, Brod-Posavina County, a village near Dragalić, Croatia
- Gorice, Šibenik-Knin County, a village near Skradin, Croatia
- Dolgovaške Gorice, a village in Slovenia
- Lendavske Gorice, a village in Slovenia
- Notranje Gorice, a village in Slovenia
- Vnanje Gorice, a village in Slovenia
- Vukomeričke gorice, a mountain in Croatia

== See also ==
- Görice
- Goricë
- Goriče (disambiguation)
- Gorica (disambiguation)
