= Siege of Rabí Castle =

Siege of Rabí
- Part of the Hussite Wars
- Věnceslav Černý - Žižka wounded in the eye in front of Rábí
Date	June 1421
Location	Rabí Castle, western Bohemia
Result	Hussite victory; capture of the castle

Belligerents
Hussite forces: Taborites; Orebites	Pilsen Landfriede

Commanders and leaders
Jan Žižka; Chval Řepický of Machovice	Jan Švihovský of Rýzmberk; Meinhard of Neuhaus

Strength
Unknown	Unknown

Casualties and losses
Unknown	Unknown

The Siege of Rabí was a successful attempt by the forces of the Orebite and Taborite unions, commanded by the hetman Jan Žižka, to capture Rabí Castle, which was defended by Švihovský z Rýzmberka noble family and the Catholic Pilsen Landfriede, in June 1421 during the early phase of the Hussite Wars. Despite the Hussites' successful capture of the extensive fortress, the event is best known for an incident in which Jan Žižka lost his remaining eye as a result of enemy crossbow fire, becoming completely blind.

== Background ==
Jan Žižka, one of the leading commanders of the Hussite armies, had faced opposition from the Catholic nobility of western Bohemia, organised into the so-called Pilsen Landfriede under the leadership of Bohuslav of Švamberk, since 1419, when he defeated its forces at the Battle of Nekmíř. After the Hussites, including Žižka and Václav Koranda, were forced to leave Pilsen in the spring of 1420, followed by the Battle of Sudoměř and the establishment of Tábor, Žižka directed his attention to other parts of Bohemia for approximately nine months.

Soon after the beginning of 1421, the Taborites under Žižka's command returned to western Bohemia. They occupied the monasteries at Kladruby and Chotěšov and captured Krasíkov Castle, where they took prisoner Bohuslav of Švamberk, an important opponent of the Hussite movement. On 2 February, they advanced towards Tachov and burned its suburbs. However, because of the large concentration of troops belonging to the Bohemian and Hungarian kings, they did not launch a full-scale assault and instead returned to Tábor to gather reinforcements.

On 14 February, the two Hussite armies besieged Pilsen, the centre of the Pilsen Landfriede. After four weeks of military operations intended to force the town to surrender, the inhabitants requested a truce lasting until the following New Year. The agreement, which included an obligation to adopt communion under both kinds and accept the Four Articles of Prague within a month, was formally ratified. However, the people of Pilsen never fulfilled its terms.

In March 1421, Žižka left Pilsen with his army and marched towards Chomutov, which he subsequently burned. Three months later, probably between 3 and 7 June, he attended a Hussite assembly in Čáslav. After the assembly adopted its resolution, he led his army towards Rabí Castle.

The fortress, one of the largest in the Kingdom of Bohemia, occupied a strategically important position beside the Otava River, on the boundary between western and southern Bohemia. It served as an important base for Jan Švihovský of Rýzmberk, who, together with his elder brother Vilém, was among the leading members of the Pilsen Landfriede. The hetman Chval Řepický of Machovice was also reportedly among the commanders of the besieging forces.

The castle's owner, Jan Švihovský, received support from Menhart II of Hradec, who arrived from his nearby castle at Velhartice. The Hussites had already besieged Rabí in 1420, but on that occasion its defenders had opened the gates without a fight.

== Siege ==
If Žižka had indeed attended the assembly in Čáslav, he would have had to travel at least several days to reach the fortress, situated more than 170 kilometres away. The beginning of the Hussite siege of Rabí can therefore be estimated to have occurred around the middle of June 1421. Very little is known from the surviving sources about the size of the Hussite forces or whether the attackers possessed siege engines.

Žižka's serious injury to his remaining eye is also dated to approximately the middle of June. The anonymous author of the Chronicle of the Very Fine Life of Jan Žižka (Kronika velmi pěkná o Janu Žižkovi) records:

Then Žižka marched forth and besieged Rabí Castle, and there his other eye was shot out. He became blind and barely survived.

— Chronicle of the Very Fine Life of Jan Žižka

Enea Silvio Piccolomini, in his History of Bohemia, gives a similar account:

Having summoned the Taborite and Orebite brethren, he lay before a castle called Rabí and besieged it with all his strength. Having been struck in the eye by an arrow, the only one through which he had seen the light of heaven, he lost it. From there he was taken to Prague to the physicians, and although his wound was treated and he survived, he never recovered his sight.

— Enea Silvio Piccolomini, History of Bohemia

The seriously wounded commander of the besieging forces was reportedly taken to Prague with fragments of the projectile still lodged in his face, where he received medical treatment. His injury did not break the morale of the Hussites, who captured Rabí shortly afterwards.

Menhart of Hradec, who had been present during the defence, was taken prisoner and briefly held at Příběnice Castle under the supervision of Zdeněk of Buchov. Another member of the Pilsen Landfriede, Bohuslav of Švamberk, was also imprisoned there.

== Aftermath ==
The capture of Rabí represented a significant Hussite success against the Catholic regional opposition and further demonstrated the ability of Hussite forces to defeat the regular military forces of their time. Jan Rabský (Švihovský) had the damaged castle repaired by 1427. The size of the medieval castle is reflected in the fact that Rabí is the largest castle ruin in the Czech Republic.

During the remaining three years of his life, Žižka, who had become completely blind following his injury at Rabí, did not devote much attention to further military operations in the territory controlled by the allies of the Pilsen Landfriede. Despite the severity of his injury, he did not remain in Prague for long. On 6 August, he joined the Prague forces on their campaign against Most, reportedly intending at least to frighten its German inhabitants.

== In culture ==
Žižka's injury became one of the frequently depicted subjects associated with the Hussite Wars, particularly during the nineteenth century. The event is mentioned, for example, by Karl Herloßsohn in his novel Hussiten (The Hussites). Alois Jirásek also included the story in his collection Old Bohemian Legends (Staré pověsti české), in the tale entitled O Žižkovi.
