= Memorial trees of Jan Žižka =

Memorial trees of Jan Žižka are trees in the Czech Republic that commemorate Hussite military commander Jan Žižka. Several old oak trees and lime trees bear his name or are connected with him through local legends. These trees are generally known as Žižkův dub (Žižka's Oak) or Žižkova lípa (Žižka's Lime Tree).

== Beech trees ==
- Žižka's beech in Dobrá Voda - legend states that Jan Žižka and his retinue once rested beneath the tree after he defeated Sigismund's army near Kutná Hora and was pursuing the fleeing soldiers toward Havlíčkův Brod (known then as Německý Brod). During this campaign, Žižka reportedly reached the small settlement of Malčín. He drank from a spring there, declared the water to be "good" (dobrá), and the settlement has allegedly been called Dobrá Voda (meaning Good Water in English) ever since. He and his retinue then rested beneath a beech tree, which bears his name to this day.
- Žižka's beech in Libáň - It used to be the largest beech tree in the region. Today, this European beech no longer exists; all that remains in its place are the final vestiges of a decayed trunk. It reportedly disappeared around the year 2000—according to locals, it perished under piles of fertilizer dumped there by members of the agricultural cooperative.

== Oak trees ==
- Žižka's oak in Borohrádek - Jan Žižka is said to have camped beneath this oak tree while fighting against the lords of Opočno. Palacký notes that the Hussites clashed with the lords of Opočno at an unknown location; however, according to František Petr—a former headmaster from Malá Čermná—this likely took place near Šachov, in a field where horse skulls, horseshoes, Hussite arrows, and spearheads have been found.
- Žižka's oaks in Chotěboř - is the name given to a group of trees—English oaks—growing north of Chotěboř. They took their name from the original "Žižka's Oak," which stood among them until 1979, when it was damaged by a windstorm; it was subsequently removed for good on July 31, 1981. According to a legend, Žižka rested beneath the original Oak during his campaign to Přibyslav.
- Žižka's oak in Dobrá Voda - Located near a spring (known as Žižka's spring) from which Žižka reportedly drank during the pursue of the soldiers fleeing toward Havlíčkův Brod (known then as Německý Brod).
- Žižka's oak in Hrutov - On the tree trunk was a plaque featuring an image of Žižka and some text—purportedly a quotation from the *Rožmberk Execution Book: “In the years of our Lord 1408–1409, Jan Žižka of Trocnov would meet beneath this oak tree with his brother Jaroslav, several lesser nobles, and common brigands, waging a small-scale guerrilla war against the alliance of lords—specifically against Lord Jindřich of Rožmberk and the town of Budějovice.” On June 29, 2022, the already dry Oak was uprooted completely due to strong winds and waterlogged soil.
- Žižka's oak in Konopiště - According to legend, Jan Žižka once camped beneath this oak tree. Dr. Marie Hrušková recorded a more recent legend. On a night in August 1968, the largest branch of Žižka's Oak broke off and fell onto a passing Soviet military column, bringing the troops to a halt between the pond and house No. 3.
- Žižka's oak in Lomany - According to legend, Jan Žižka and his army passed by the oak tree, and in its shade, he planned an attack on the Cistercian monastery in Plasy.
- Žižka's oak in Lomnice - according to a legend dating back to 1420, a fleeing priest from Lomnice was allegedly burned to death by Hussite insurgents inside the hollow of an oak tree. People believed the tree to be 800 years old, which—combined with the legend—earned it the name "Žižka’s Oak." Traces of fire were indeed present within the hollow, though these were reportedly of a more recent origin.
- Žižka's oak in Myšlín - linked to a story dating back to 1421, during a campaign toward Český Brod. It is said that a priest named Petr of Cimburk was hanged on the Myšlín Oak. He had met with Jan Žižka there to negotiate on behalf of the town of Mnichovice. The two knew each other from the royal court. However, Petr of Cimburk was accused of being a spy and executed. It later emerged that the actual spy was the very soldier who had denounced Cimburk... Mnichovice was spared however.
- Žižka's oak in Náměšť nad Oslavou - Legend has it that during the Hussite campaign into Moravia and the siege of the castle, Jan Žižka slept beneath the oak tree, or perhaps tied his horse to it.
- Žižka's oak in Trocnov - A legend concerning the birth of Jan Žižka is associated with the tree. Žižka's mother, Kateřina, was hurrying home from the fields as a storm approached. Labor pains overtook her beneath a massive oak tree, and thus her son—named Jan, after his father—was born during the storm in the forest, beneath the trunk of the old oak.
- Žižka's oak in Třemošnice - it is named after Žižka because two Hussite expeditions besieged nearby Lichnice Castle. However, Žižka himself did not take part in either expedition. The oak is said to have stood near the castle's original gate—having been planted there when the castle was built around 1250—and is located today by the former inn in the southern part of the village.
- 'Žižka's oak in Újezd nade Mží - Žižka reportedly rested beneath the tree during one of his campaigns.
- Žižka's oak in Želiv - according to a legend, the Hussites camped by an oak tree near the pond during their siege of the Želiv Monastery in 1424. The Hussites emerged victorious, plundered and set fire to the monastery, while the monks managed to escape at the last moment—placing their trust in Jan of Leskovec, who had been defending the monastery. In time, the monks returned, but their stay was short-lived; the new lord of the Želiv estate drove them out as well.
- Tortured One's" Oak - it is linked to a legend recorded in 17th century which states that Žižka sent one of his captains to scout the vicinity of Doksany monastery. Moved by the nuns' plight and their terror, the captain sought to save them and therefore tried to avert a Hussite attack on the monastery. For this, the Žižka had him tortured to death beneath an oak tree—hence the name "At the Tortured Man’s" (*U umučeného*). It was even said that the spot was haunted at midnight, with the tormented captain's spirit serving as a reminder of Žižka's wicked deed, even after death. The legend was recorded in an environment not sympathetic to Žižka and was likely reported to make people dislike him. The incident reportedly happened during siege of Doksany but Žižka didn't participate in it as he led the Siege of Rabí Castle at the time. This version of the legend didn't become very popular among people who started to recount it differently. It is said that the captain allowed himself to be bribed at the monastery and tried to prevent the attack; in exchange for the bribe, Žižka had molten gold poured down his throat beneath an oak tree.

== Linden trees ==
- Žižka's linden in Běšiny
- Žižka's linden in Boskovice - unclear why it is called Žižka's.
- Žižka's linden in Kopřivnice - it was named "Žižka's" by the Club of Czechoslovak Tourists in 1933 because Šostýn castle's last owners were said to belong to the Moravian Hussite nobility.
- Žižka's linden in Krčín - according to a legend Hynek Červenohorský, a royal military captain, raided Krčín (which sympathized with the Hussites), killed some of the inhabitants, let his horse drink from a chalice, and then declared that his horse, too, was now of the Hussite faith. When news of this reached Žižka, he organized an expedition to Krčín and punished Červenohorský for the insult to the Hussites. Although the legend is based on fact—the event was even recorded in chronicles—this linden tree does not date back to the time of Žižka. The Linden is tied to several other legends and is known also as Jirásek's or Vojnar's.
- Žižka's linden in Malonice
- Žižka's linden in Nejepín
- Žižka's linden in Ostaš
- Žižka's linden in Semtiny
- Žižka's linden in Sobčice
- Žižka's linden in Sudslavice
- Žižka's linden in Tabotiny
- Žižka's linden in Velké Petrovice
- Žižka's lindens on Žižka's table - several lindens located on a hill known as Žižka's table on which Žižka reportedly camped in 1423.

== Pear Trees ==
- Žižka's Pear Tree in Otěvěk - According to legend, Jan Žižka used to meet with his friend, the lesser nobleman Ješek of Otěvěk, beneath the original pear tree. Both shared the same view regarding the oppression of the lesser nobility by the Rosenberg lords. Later, however, Ješek grew dissatisfied with Žižka's approach to the issue and ended their friendship.
- Žižka's Pear Tree in Rabí - In April 1420, Žižka launched his first attack on Rabí Castle. Believing the castle to be impregnable, the locals had hidden all their secular and ecclesiastical treasures within its walls before the assault. The Hussites burned down several buildings, filled the moat with straw and brushwood, breached the courtyard, and overpowered the garrison. Seven priests and monks were reportedly thrown into the fire, and it seemed that the family of Půta Švihovský of Rýzmberk—the castle's owner—might suffer the same fate. However, Žižka spared them; he ordered only the valuables hidden within the castle to be burned, keeping nothing for himself as spoils other than arms and equipment. After the Hussites withdrew, Jan of Rýzmberk had the castle repaired and began devising plans against Žižka. Consequently, in July 1421, Žižka returned to Rabí and laid siege to the castle. Accounts of what followed differ. According to one version, Žižka was standing near the castle gate beneath a pear tree when the castle commander, Přibík Kočovský, fired an arrow that passed through the open visor of Žižka's helmet, costing him an eye. Another version suggests that Přibík's arrow struck the pear tree, causing a splinter to break off and strike Žižka, resulting in the loss of his eye. Another version of the legend places the pear tree—and Žižka—in a field further away from the castle; it makes no mention of Přibík Kočovský, referring instead only to a stray arrow that struck the tree and dislodged the famous splinter.

== Others ==
- Tutleky Hawthorn - Žižka reportedly camped beneath the tree.

== See also ==
- Jan Žižka
