= Hořice (disambiguation) =

Hořice is a town in the Hradec Králové Region of the Czech Republic.

Hořice may also refer to places in the Czech Republic:

- Hořice (Pelhřimov District), a municipality and village in the Vysočina Region
- Hořice, a village and part of Blansko in the South Moravian Region
- Hořice, a village and part of Spálené Poříčí in the Plzeň Region
- Hořice na Šumavě, a municipality and village in the South Bohemian Region
- Dolní Hořice, a municipality and village in the South Bohemian Region
  - Horní Hořice, a village and part of Dolní Hořice in the South Bohemian Region
