= Horký =

Horký (feminine: Horká) is a Czech and Slovak surname. Notable people with this surname include:

- Josef Horký (born 1972), Czech swimmer
- Marcel Horký (born 1973), Slovak footballer
- Rita Horky (1937–1987), American basketball player and coach
- Hana Horká (1964–2022), Czech singer
- Helena Horká (born 1981), Czech volleyball player

== See also ==
- Horky (disambiguation)
- Ludmila Hořká – Czechoslovak ethnographicist
