= Ladislav Toman =

Ladislav Toman may refer to:

- Ladislav Toman (volleyball)
- Ladislav Toman (sculptor)
