= Goritsa =

Goritsa (Bulgarian: горица) may refer to:

In Bulgaria

- Goritsa, Burgas Province
- Goritsa, Dobrich Province
- Goritsa, Targovishte Province
- Goritsa, Varna Province

In other countries

- Goritsa (Greece), an archaeological site at Volos.
- Goritsa Rocks, two contiguous rocks in Zed Islands in the South Shetland Islands
- Gkoritsa, a village in Laconia, Greece

== See also ==
- Gorica (disambiguation), alternative spelling
