= Chotěšov =

Chotěšov may refer to places in the Czech Republic:

- Chotěšov (Litoměřice District), a municipality and village in the Ústí nad Labem Region
- Chotěšov (Plzeň-South District), a municipality and village in the Plzeň Region
  - Chotěšov Abbey, an abbey in Chotěšov
- Chotěšov, a village and part of Jesenice (Rakovník District) in the Central Bohemian Region
- Chotěšov, a village and part of Velhartice in the Plzeň Region
