= Goriče =

Goriče (pronounced [ɡɔˈɾiːtʃɛ]) may refer to:

- Goriče, Kranj, a village in Slovenia
- Goriče, Postojna, a village in Slovenia
- Goriče pri Famljah, a village in Slovenia
- Srednja Vas–Goriče, a village in Slovenia

== See also ==
- Gorice (disambiguation)
