= Ladislav Toman (sculptor) =

Czech sculptor

- Born: 19 June 1894; Prasetín, Austria-Hungary
- Died: 29 May 1935 (aged 40); Prague, Czechoslovakia
- Occupation: Sculptor

Ladislav Toman (19 June 1894 – 29 May 1935) was a Czech sculptor. His work was part of the sculpture event in the art competition at the 1936 Summer Olympics.
