= 3137 Horky =

Background asteroid in asteroid belt

Discovery
- Discovered by: A. Mrkos
- Discovery site: Kleť Obs.
- Discovery date: 16 September 1982

Designations
- Named after: Horky (Czech hill and village)
- Alternative designations: 1982 SM_{1} · 1971 UC_{2} 1976 AC
- Minor planet category: main-belt · (inner) background

Orbital characteristics
- Epoch 23 March 2018 (JD 2458200.5)
- Uncertainty parameter 0
- Observation arc: 68.17 yr (24,900 d)
- Aphelion: 2.8571 AU
- Perihelion: 1.9482 AU
- Semi-major axis: 2.4026 AU
- Eccentricity: 0.1892
- Orbital period (sidereal): 3.72 yr (1,360 d)
- Mean anomaly: 143.98°
- Mean motion: 0° 15^{m} 52.92^{s} / day
- Inclination: 2.4738°
- Longitude of ascending node: 286.63°
- Argument of perihelion: 135.50°

Physical characteristics
- Mean diameter: 6.685±0.089 km
- Geometric albedo: 0.207±0.030
- Spectral type: SMASS = C
- Absolute magnitude (H): 13.3

3137 Horky, provisional designation 1982 SM_{1}, is a background asteroid from the inner regions of the asteroid belt, approximately 7 kilometers (4.3 miles) in diameter. It was discovered on 16 September 1982, by Czech astronomer Antonín Mrkos at the Kleť Observatory in the Czech Republic. The likely stony asteroid was named for a hill near the Czech village of Horky.

== Orbit and classification ==
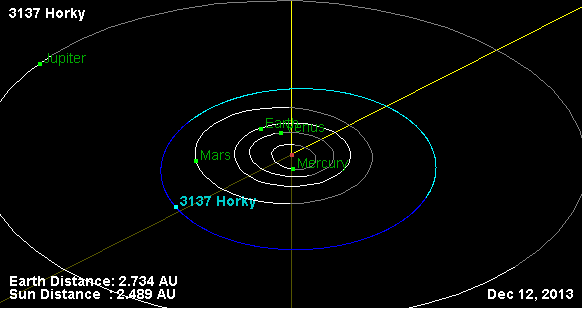
Orbital diagram of Horky

Horky is a non-family asteroid from the main belt's background population. It orbits the Sun in the inner asteroid belt at a distance of 1.9–2.9 AU once every 3 years and 9 months (1,360 days; semi-major axis of 2.4 AU). Its orbit has an eccentricity of 0.19 and an inclination of 2° with respect to the ecliptic.

The body's observation arc begins with a precovery taken at Palomar Observatory in November 1949, almost 33 years prior to its official discovery observation at Klet.

=== Close approaches ===
On 1 May 2019, Horky will pass 15 Eunomia at a distance of 1,440,000 km (0.0096 AU). It is also projected to make close approaches to 29 Amphitrite, 7 Iris and 10 Hygiea.

== Physical characteristics ==
In the SMASS classification, Horky is a carbonaceous C-type asteroid. However, based on the obtained albedo by the Wide-field Infrared Survey Explorer (WISE), it is rather a stony S-type (see below). As of 2018, no rotational lightcurve of this asteroid has been obtained from photometric observations. The body's rotation period, pole and shape remain unknown.

=== Diameter and albedo ===
According to the survey carried out by the NEOWISE mission of NASA's WISE telescope, Horky measures 6.685 kilometers in diameter and its surface has an albedo of 0.207, which indicates that is likely of a stony rather than carbonaceous composition. It has an absolute magnitude of 13.3.

== Naming ==
This minor planet was named after a hill and its nearby village Horky in the Czech Republic, where the discoverer installed his first telescope in 1939. The official naming citation was published by the Minor Planet Center on 29 November 1993 (M.P.C. 22828).
