= Paul Sindelar =

American academic

- Education: Dartmouth College; University of Illinois Urbana-Champaign; University of Minnesota
- Occupation: Academic

Paul Sindelar is an American academic. He was a distinguished professor of the department of special education at the University of Florida.

Sindelar attended Dartmouth College, earning his BA degree in 1969. He also attended the University of Illinois Urbana-Champaign, earning his MA degree in 1974, and earned his PhD degree in 1977 at the University of Minnesota.
