= Horky nad Jizerou =

- Municipality
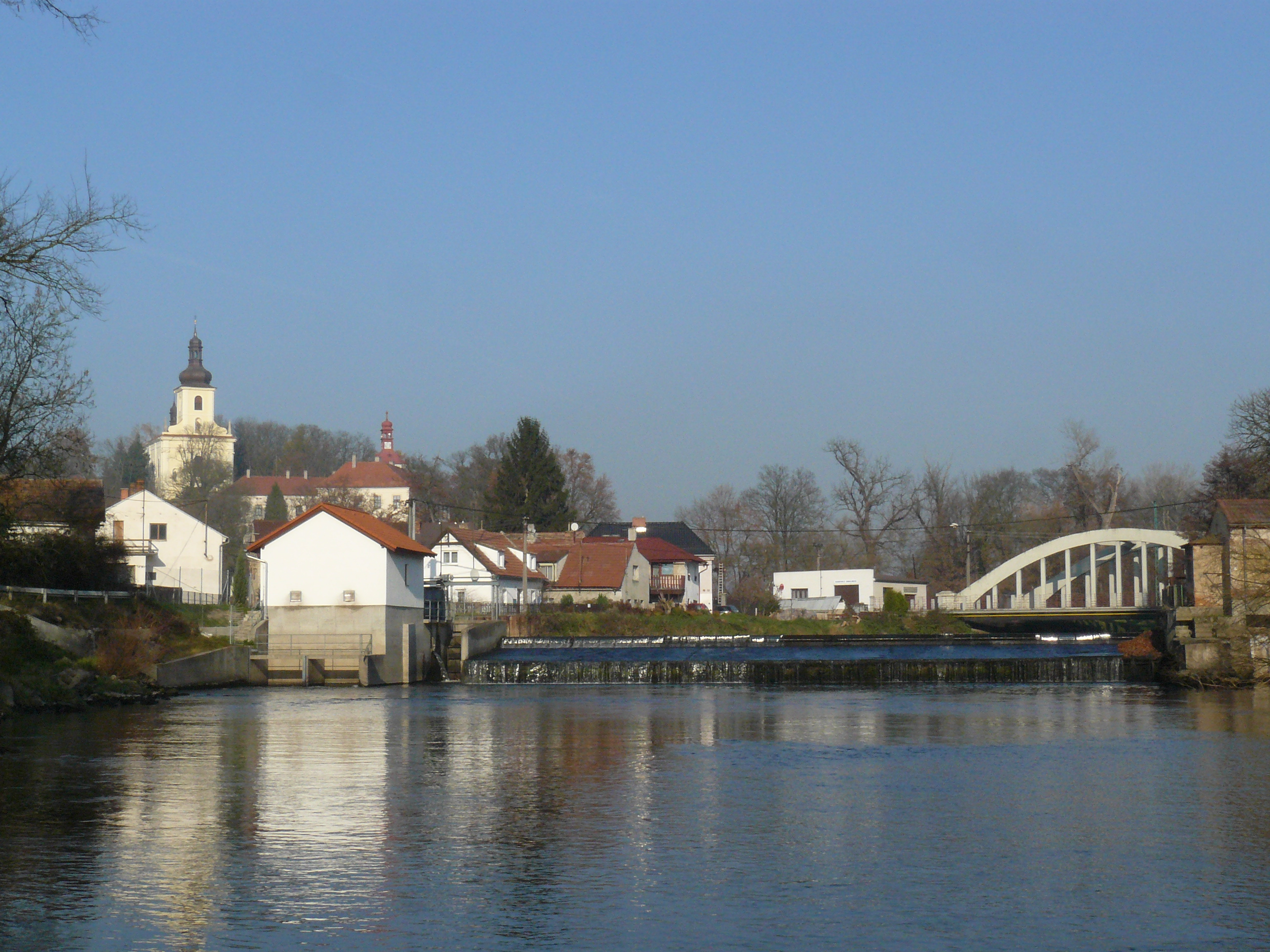
- View from the south

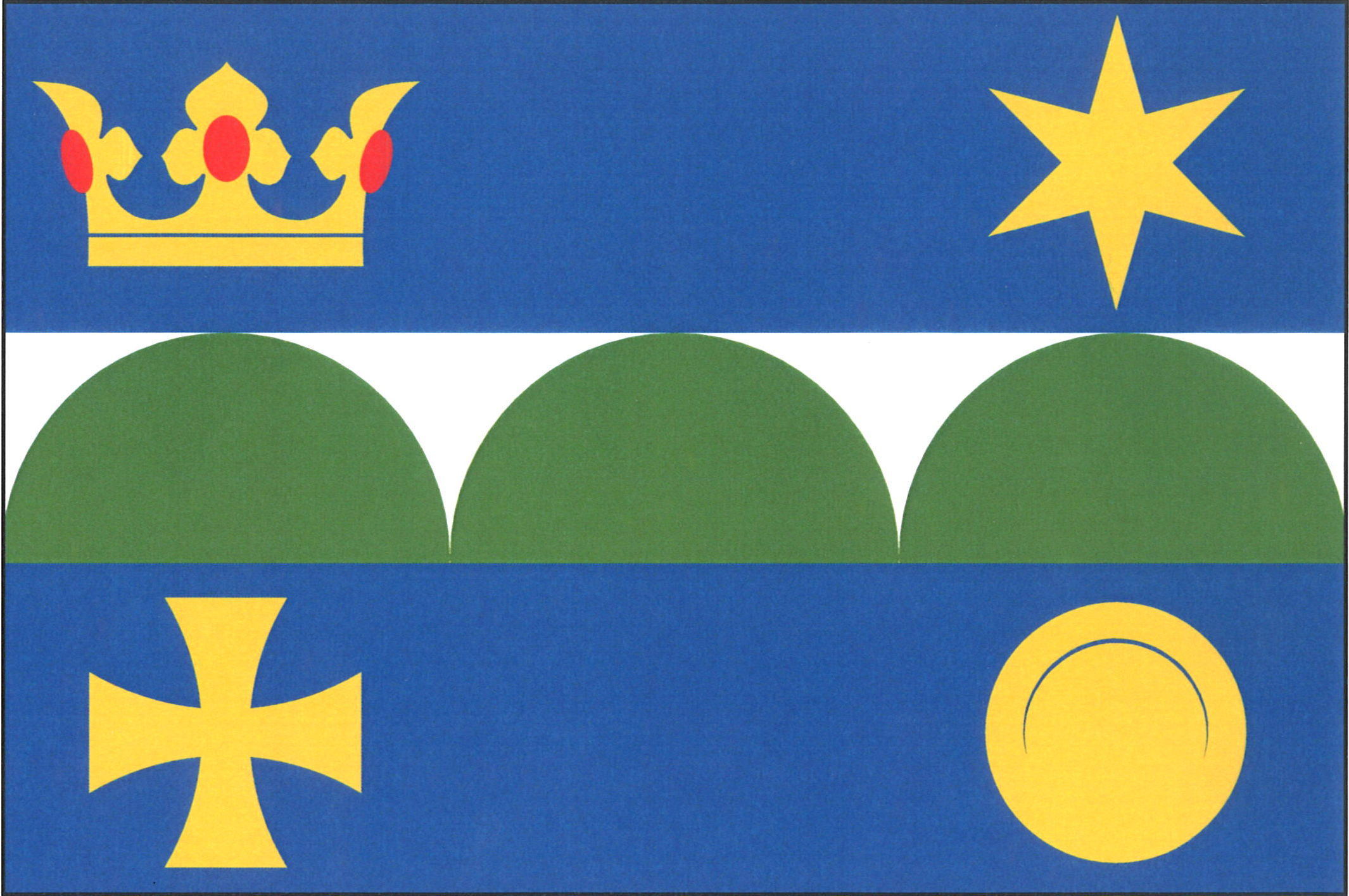
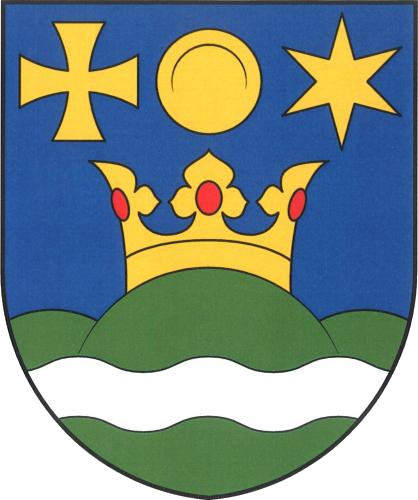
- Flag Coat of arms

- Location in the Czech Republic
- Coordinates: 50°19′38″N 14°51′22″E
- Country: Czech Republic
- Region: Central Bohemian
- District: Mladá Boleslav
- First mentioned: 1505

Area
  - Total: 4.15 km^{2} (1.60 sq mi)
- Elevation: 215 m (705 ft)

Population (2026-01-01)
  - Total: 623
  - Density: 150/km^{2} (389/sq mi)
- Time zone: UTC+1 (CET)
  - Summer (DST): UTC+2 (CEST)
- Postal code: 294 73
- Website: www.horkynj.cz

Horky nad Jizerou is a municipality and village in Mladá Boleslav District in the Central Bohemian Region of the Czech Republic. It has about 600 inhabitants.

== Geography ==
Horky nad Jizerou is located about 10 kilometres (6 mi) south of Mladá Boleslav and 33 km (21 mi) northeast of Prague. It lies in a flat agricultural landscape in the Jizera Table. The municipality is situated on the right bank of the Jizera River, which forms the eastern municipal border.

== Demographics ==
Historical population
Year	Pop.	±%
1869	549	—
1880	588	+7.1%
1890	608	+3.4%
1900	658	+8.2%
1910	643	−2.3%
1921	627	−2.5%
1930	640	+2.1%
1950	554	−13.4%
1961	499	−9.9%
1970	483	−3.2%
1980	443	−8.3%
1991	384	−13.3%
2001	405	+5.5%
2011	488	+20.5%
2021	570	+16.8%
Source: Censuses
