= Chotěšov (Litoměřice District) =

- Municipality
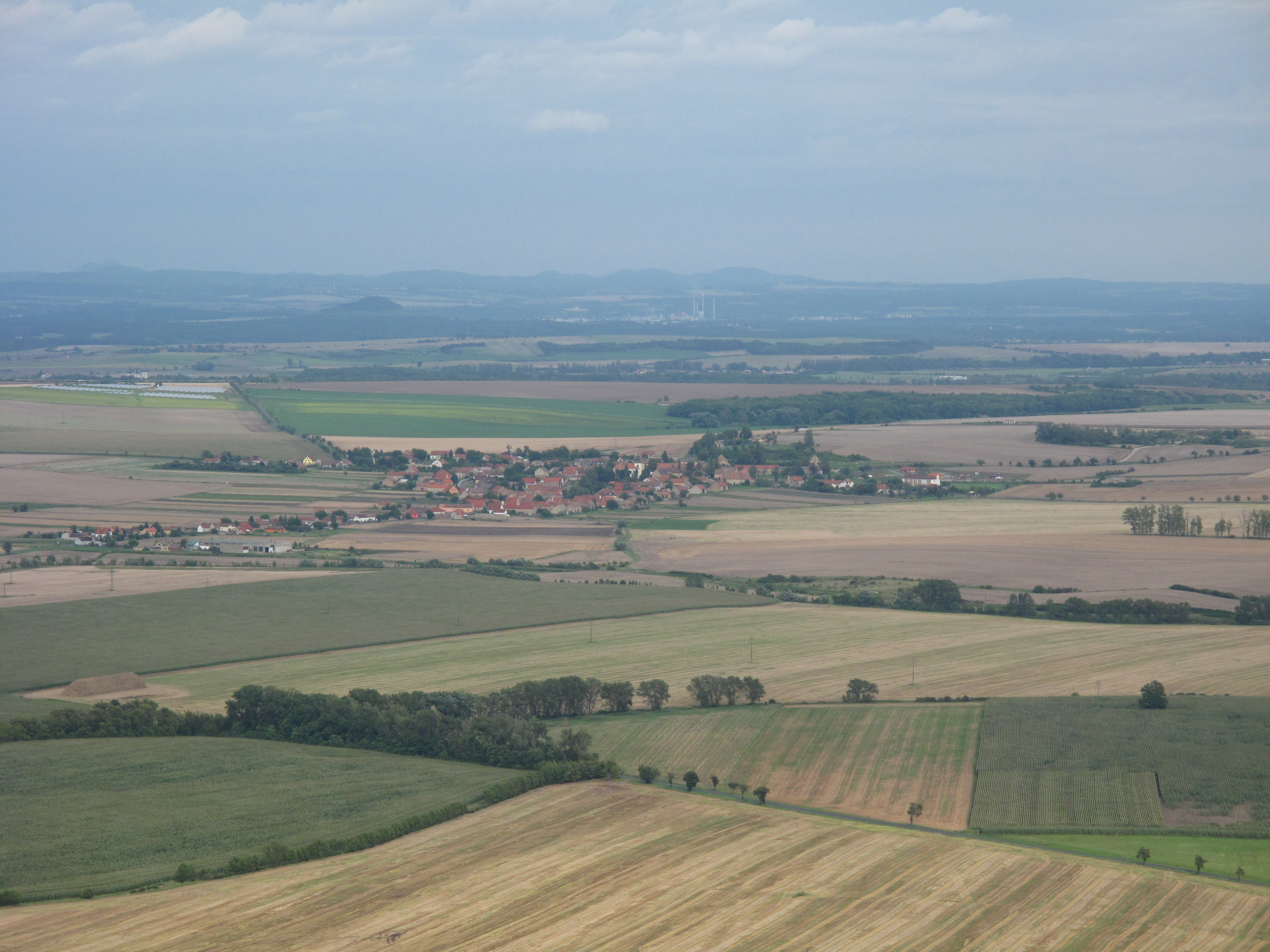
- Chotěšov seen from Hazmburk

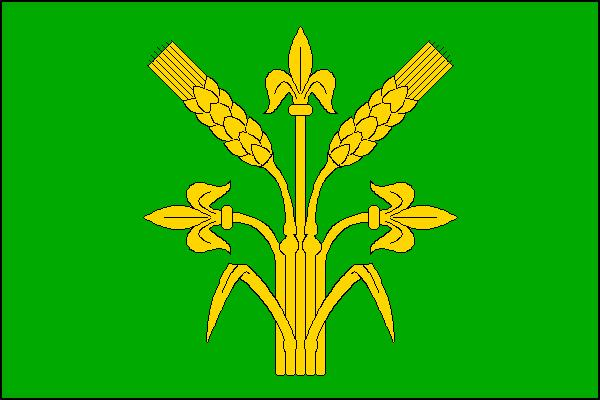
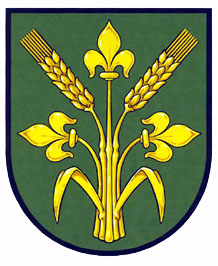
- Flag Coat of arms

- Location in the Czech Republic
- Coordinates: 50°26′24″N 14°5′7″E
- Country: Czech Republic
- Region: Ústí nad Labem
- District: Litoměřice
- First mentioned: 1057

Area
  - Total: 7.82 km^{2} (3.02 sq mi)
- Elevation: 197 m (646 ft)

Population (2026-01-01)
  - Total: 508
  - Density: 65.0/km^{2} (168/sq mi)
- Time zone: UTC+1 (CET)
  - Summer (DST): UTC+2 (CEST)
- Postal code: 410 02
- Website: www.ou-chotesov.cz

Chotěšov is a municipality and village in Litoměřice District in the Ústí nad Labem Region of the Czech Republic. It has about 500 inhabitants.

Chotěšov lies approximately 11 kilometres (7 mi) south of Litoměřice, 25 km (16 mi) south of Ústí nad Labem, and 46 km (29 mi) north-west of Prague.

== Demographics ==
Historical population
Year	Pop.	±%
1869	571	—
1880	676	+18.4%
1890	679	+0.4%
1900	649	−4.4%
1910	640	−1.4%
1921	691	+8.0%
1930	650	−5.9%
1950	473	−27.2%
1961	467	−1.3%
1970	437	−6.4%
1980	419	−4.1%
1991	374	−10.7%
2001	453	+21.1%
2011	461	+1.8%
2021	537	+16.5%
Source: Censuses
