= Kladruby (Benešov District) =

Municipality in the Czech Republic

- Municipality
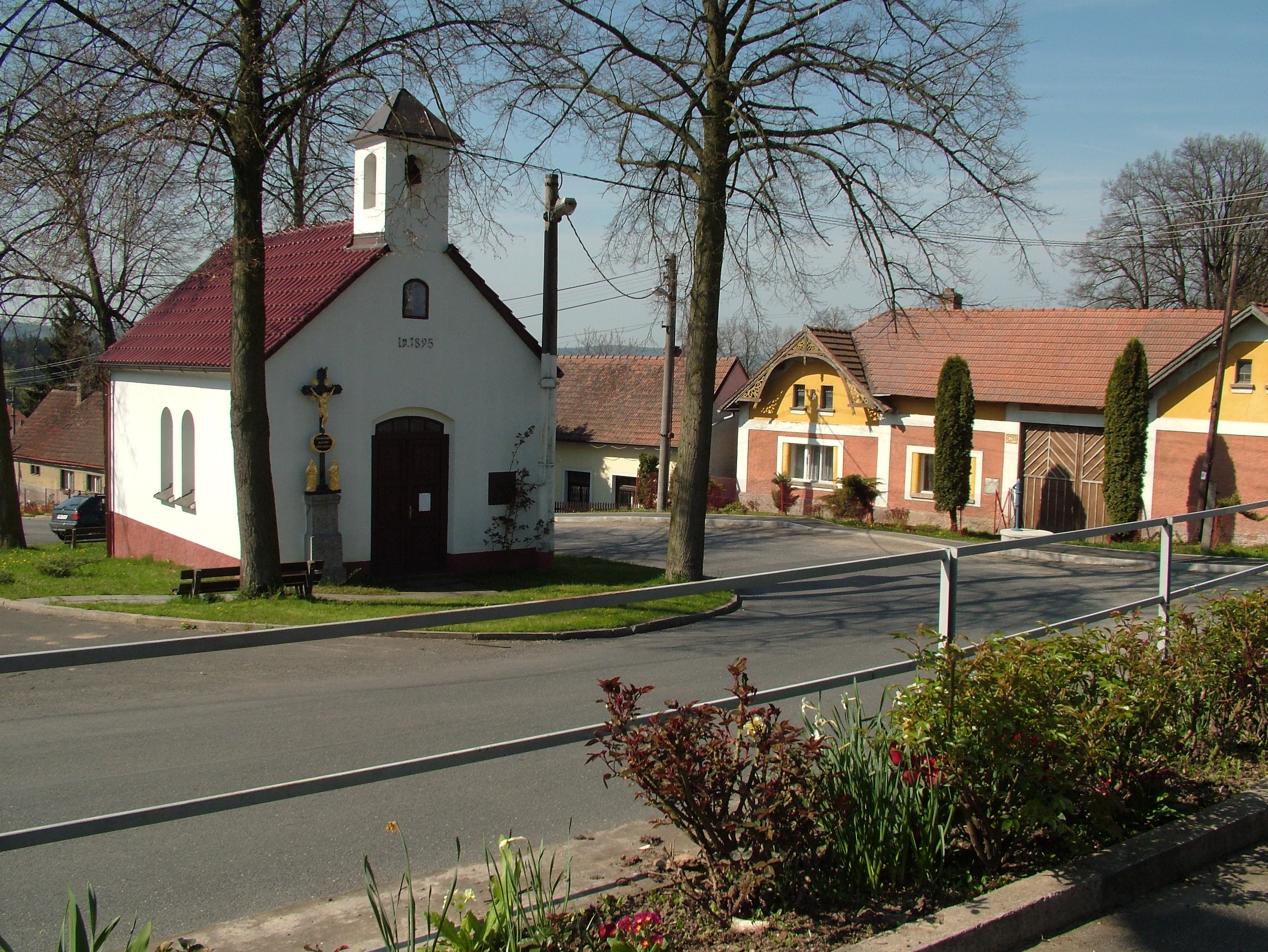
- Chapel of Saint Wenceslaus

- Flag Coat of arms

- Location in the Czech Republic
- Coordinates: 49°43′24″N 14°57′0″E
- Country: Czech Republic
- Region: Central Bohemian
- District: Benešov
- First mentioned: 1405

Area
  - Total: 4.73 km^{2} (1.83 sq mi)
- Elevation: 445 m (1,460 ft)

Population (2026-01-01)
  - Total: 291
  - Density: 61.5/km^{2} (159/sq mi)
- Time zone: UTC+1 (CET)
  - Summer (DST): UTC+2 (CEST)
- Postal code: 258 01
- Website: www.kladrubyuvlasimi.cz

Kladruby is a municipality and village in Benešov District in the Central Bohemian Region of the Czech Republic. It has about 300 inhabitants.

== Etymology ==
The name Kladruby is a common Czech name of settlements, derived from kláda (i.e. 'log') and rubat (i.e. 'to chop'). This name was used for settlements where lumberjacks lived.

== Geography ==
Kladruby is located about 20 kilometres (12 mi) east of Benešov and 47 km (29 mi) southeast of Prague. It lies in the Vlašim Uplands. The highest point is the hill Kostelík at 534 m (1,752 ft) above sea level. The Blanice River flows along the western municipal border.

== History ==
The first written mention of Kladruby is from 1405. In 1533, the village was listed as a part of the Vlašim estate, owned by the Trčka of Lípa family. They sold the estate in 1546 and the owners of Kladruby then often changed.

== Demographics ==
Historical population

Year	Pop.	±%
1869	155	—
1880	179	+15.5%
1890	201	+12.3%
1900	192	−4.5%
1910	175	−8.9%

Year	Pop.	±%
1921	167	−4.6%
1930	169	+1.2%
1950	347	+105.3%
1961	254	−26.8%
1970	234	−7.9%

Year	Pop.	±%
1980	259	+10.7%
1991	279	+7.7%
2001	195	−30.1%
2011	231	+18.5%
2021	276	+19.5%

Source: Censuses

== Economy ==
Kladruby is known for a large rehabilitation institute. It was founded here in the 1930s.

== Transport ==
There are no railways or major roads passing through the municipality.

== Sights ==
There are no protected cultural monuments in the municipality. The main landmark of Kladruby is the Chapel of Saint Wenceslaus. It replaced an old chapel, which was demolished in 1895.
