= Radio Gorica =

Radio station in Montenegro

Radio Gorica is a radio station in Podgorica Montenegro, broadcasting at 93.3 MHz. The name Gorica means small hill in Montenegrin and other Slavic languages.
