= Gorica, Danilovgrad =

Gorica Горица
- Village
- Location within Montenegro
- Coordinates: 42.562502°N 19.130569°E
- Country: Montenegro
- Municipality: Danilovgrad

Population (2011)
  - Total: 141
- Time zone: UTC+1 (CET)
  - Summer (DST): UTC+2 (CEST)

Gorica (Montenegrin Cyrillic: Горица) is a small village in the municipality of Danilovgrad, Montenegro.

== Demographics ==
According to the 2011 census, its population was 141.

Ethnicity in 2011
Ethnicity	Number	Percentage
Montenegrins	65	46.1%
Serbs	62	44.0%
other/undeclared	14	9.9%
Total	141	100%
