= Gorice, Sanski Most =

Gorice
- Village
- Location within Bosnia and Herzegovina
- Coordinates: 44.783077°N 16.478858°E
- Country: Bosnia and Herzegovina
- Entity: Federation of Bosnia and Herzegovina
- Canton: Una-Sana
- Municipality: Sanski Most

Area
  - Total: 1.53 sq mi (3.97 km^{2})

Population (2013)
  - Total: 615
  - Density: 401/sq mi (155/km^{2})
- Time zone: UTC+1 (CET)
  - Summer (DST): UTC+2 (CEST)

Gorice is a village in the municipality of Sanski Most, Federation of Bosnia and Herzegovina, Bosnia and Herzegovina.

== Demographics ==
According to the 2013 census, its population was 615.

Ethnicity in 2013
Ethnicity	Number	Percentage
Bosniaks	614	99.8%
Serbs	1	0.2%
Total	615	100%
