= Hořice (Pelhřimov District) =

- Municipality
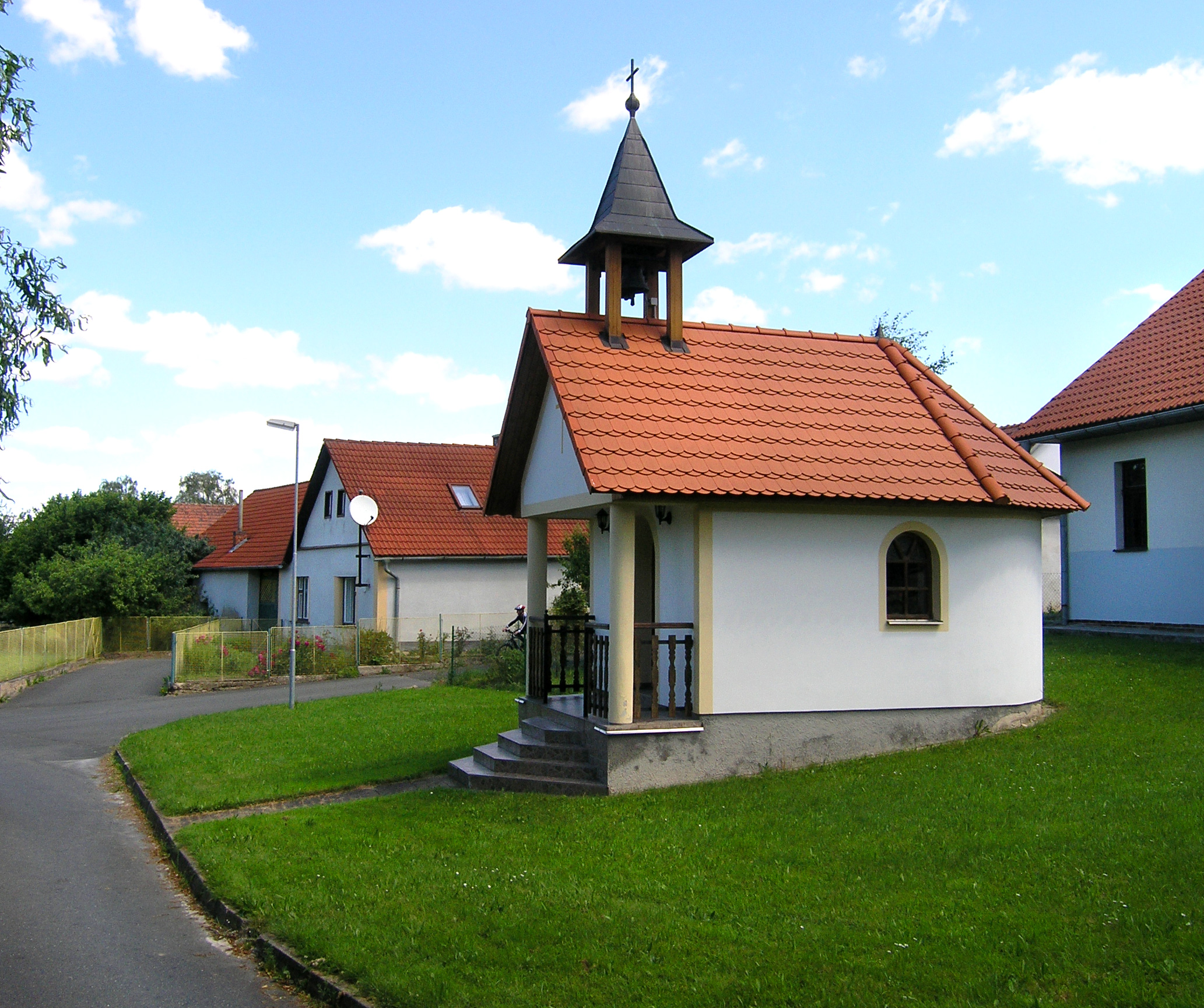
- Chapel in the centre of Hořice

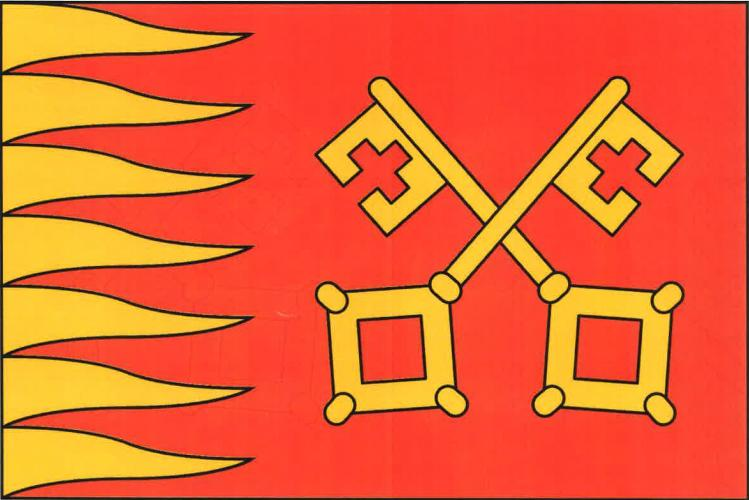
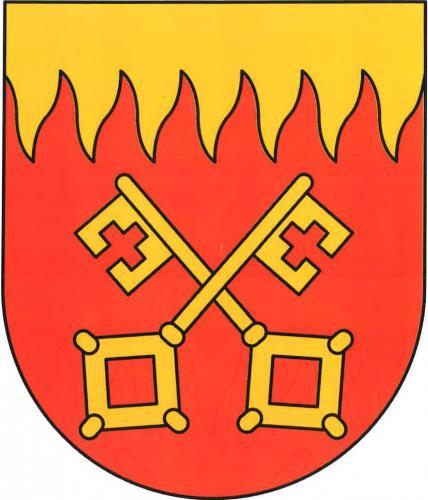
- Flag Coat of arms

- Location in the Czech Republic
- Coordinates: 49°35′58″N 15°11′8″E
- Country: Czech Republic
- Region: Vysočina
- District: Pelhřimov
- First mentioned: 1352

Area
  - Total: 6.86 km^{2} (2.65 sq mi)
- Elevation: 468 m (1,535 ft)

Population (2026-01-01)
  - Total: 206
  - Density: 30.0/km^{2} (77.8/sq mi)
- Time zone: UTC+1 (CET)
  - Summer (DST): UTC+2 (CEST)
- Postal code: 396 01
- Website: www.obec-horice.cz

Hořice is a municipality and village in Pelhřimov District in the Vysočina Region of the Czech Republic. It has about 200 inhabitants.

== Administrative division ==
Hořice consists of three municipal parts (in brackets population according to the 2021 census):

- Hořice (128)
- Děkančice (17)
- Hroznětice (43)

== Etymology ==
The name Hořice is probably derived from the surname Hora, meaning "the village of Hora's people", but it could be also derived from the word hořice, which is an Old Czech diminutive form of hora (i.e. 'mountain').

== Geography ==
Bernartice is located about 19 kilometres (12 mi) north of Pelhřimov and 36 km (22 mi) northwest of Jihlava]. It lies in the Křemešník Highlands. The highest point is the Horka hill at 513 m (1,683 ft) above sea level. The municipality borders the Švihov Reservoir, which is built on the Želivka River.

== History ==
The first written mention of Hořice is from 1352.

== Demographics ==
Historical population

Year	Pop.	±%
1869	415	—
1880	408	−1.7%
1890	382	−6.4%
1900	425	+11.3%
1910	436	+2.6%

Year	Pop.	±%
1921	421	−3.4%
1930	358	−15.0%
1950	255	−28.8%
1961	228	−10.6%
1970	214	−6.1%

Year	Pop.	±%
1980	215	+0.5%
1991	207	−3.7%
2001	181	−12.6%
2011	165	−8.8%
2021	188	+13.9%

Source: Censuses

== Transport ==
The D1 motorway from Prague to Brno runs through the northern part of the municipality.

== Sights ==
There are no protected cultural monuments in the municipality. The only landmarks are two chapels in Hořice, one chapel in Děkančice and one chapel in Hroznětice.
