= Kladruby (Rokycany District) =

- Municipality
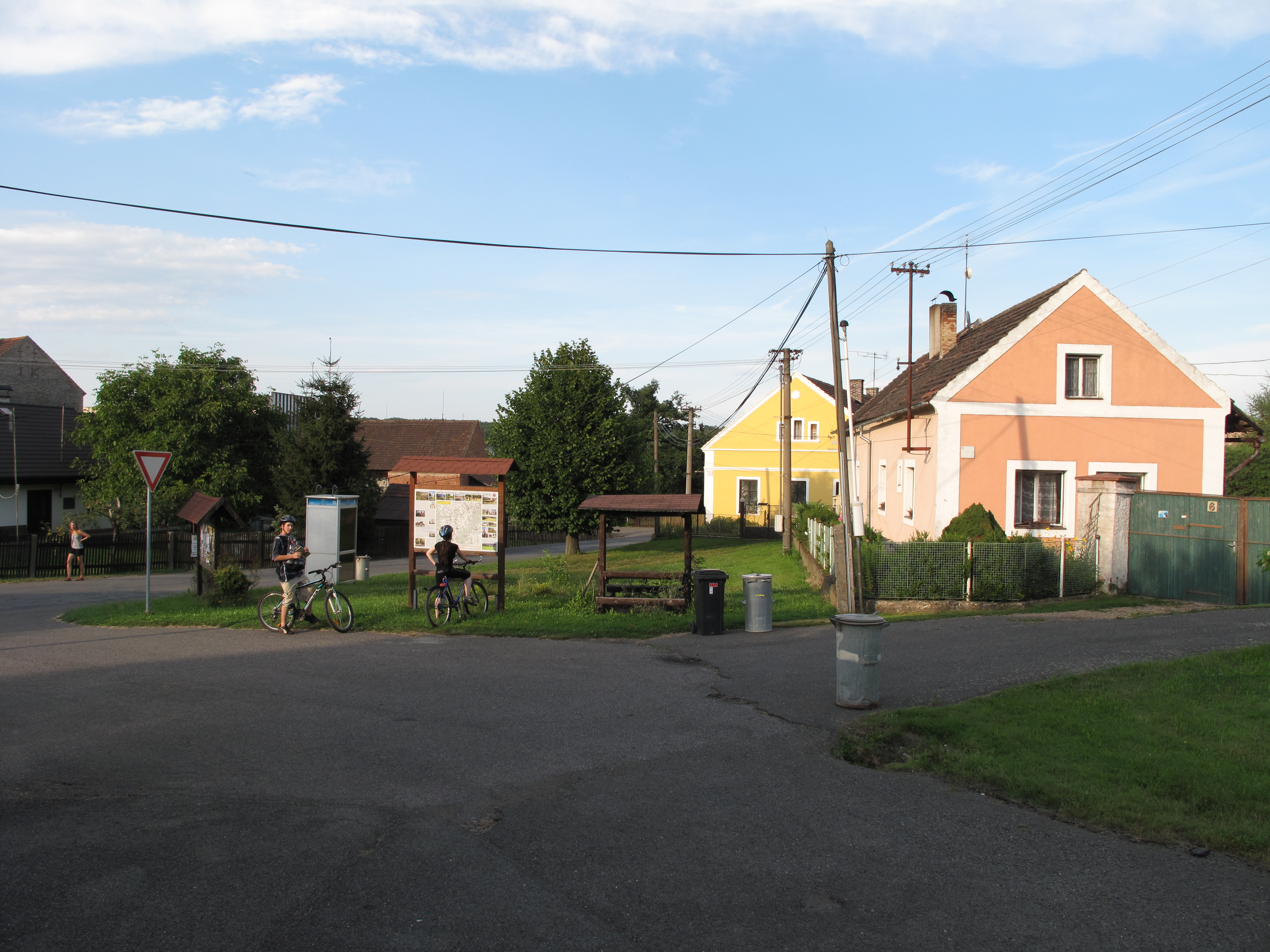
- Centre of Kladruby

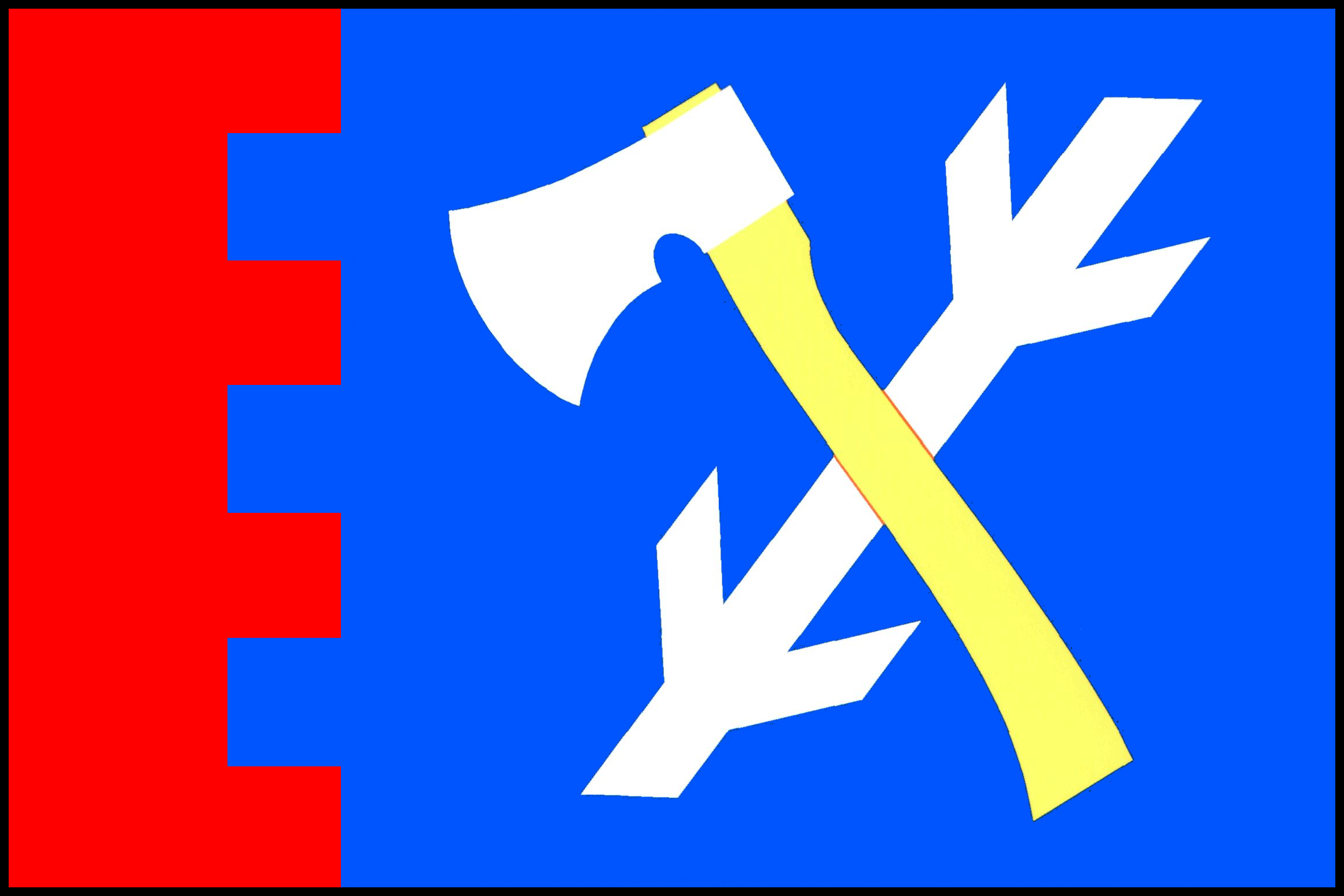
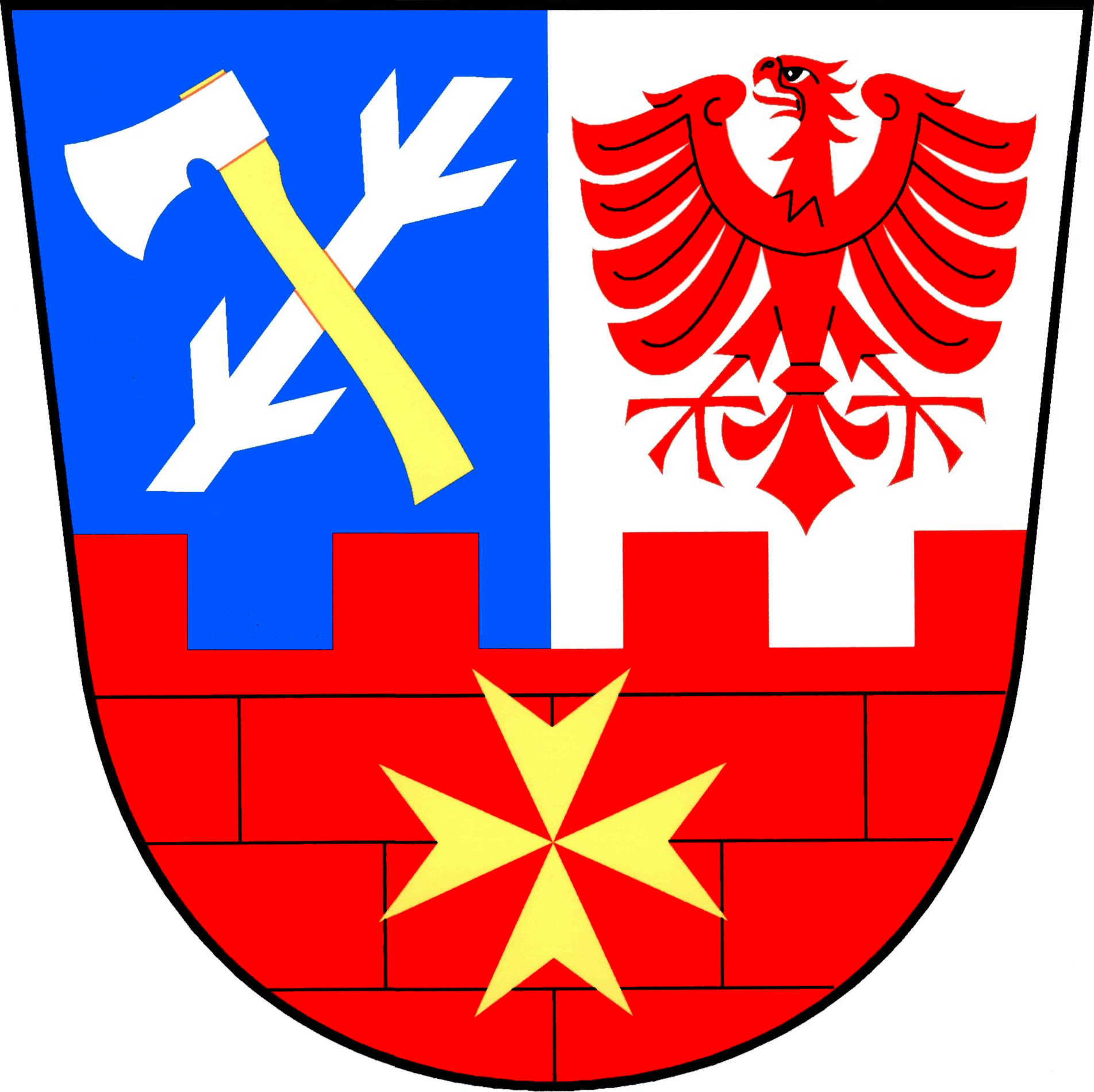
- Flag Coat of arms

- Location in the Czech Republic
- Coordinates: 49°54′47″N 13°37′54″E
- Country: Czech Republic
- Region: Plzeň
- District: Rokycany
- First mentioned: 1329

Area
  - Total: 13.71 km^{2} (5.29 sq mi)
- Elevation: 385 m (1,263 ft)

Population (2026-01-01)
  - Total: 152
  - Density: 11.1/km^{2} (28.7/sq mi)
- Time zone: UTC+1 (CET)
  - Summer (DST): UTC+2 (CEST)
- Postal code: 338 08
- Website: www.obec-kladruby.cz

Kladruby is a municipality and village in Rokycany District in the Plzeň Region of the Czech Republic. It has about 200 inhabitants.

Kladruby lies approximately 19 kilometres (12 mi) north of Rokycany, 26 km (16 mi) north-east of Plzeň, and 61 km (38 mi) west of Prague.

== Administrative division ==
Kladruby consists of four municipal parts (in brackets population according to the 2021 census):

- Kladruby (110)
- Hřešihlavy (17)
- Třímany (17)
- Vojenice (3)

== Demographics ==
Historical population
Year	Pop.	±%
1869	792	—
1880	784	−1.0%
1890	642	−18.1%
1900	639	−0.5%
1910	608	−4.9%
1921	585	−3.8%
1930	500	−14.5%
1950	364	−27.2%
1961	302	−17.0%
1970	219	−27.5%
1980	172	−21.5%
1991	196	+14.0%
2001	169	−13.8%
2011	147	−13.0%
2021	147	+0.0%
Source: Censuses
