= Horka I =

- Municipality
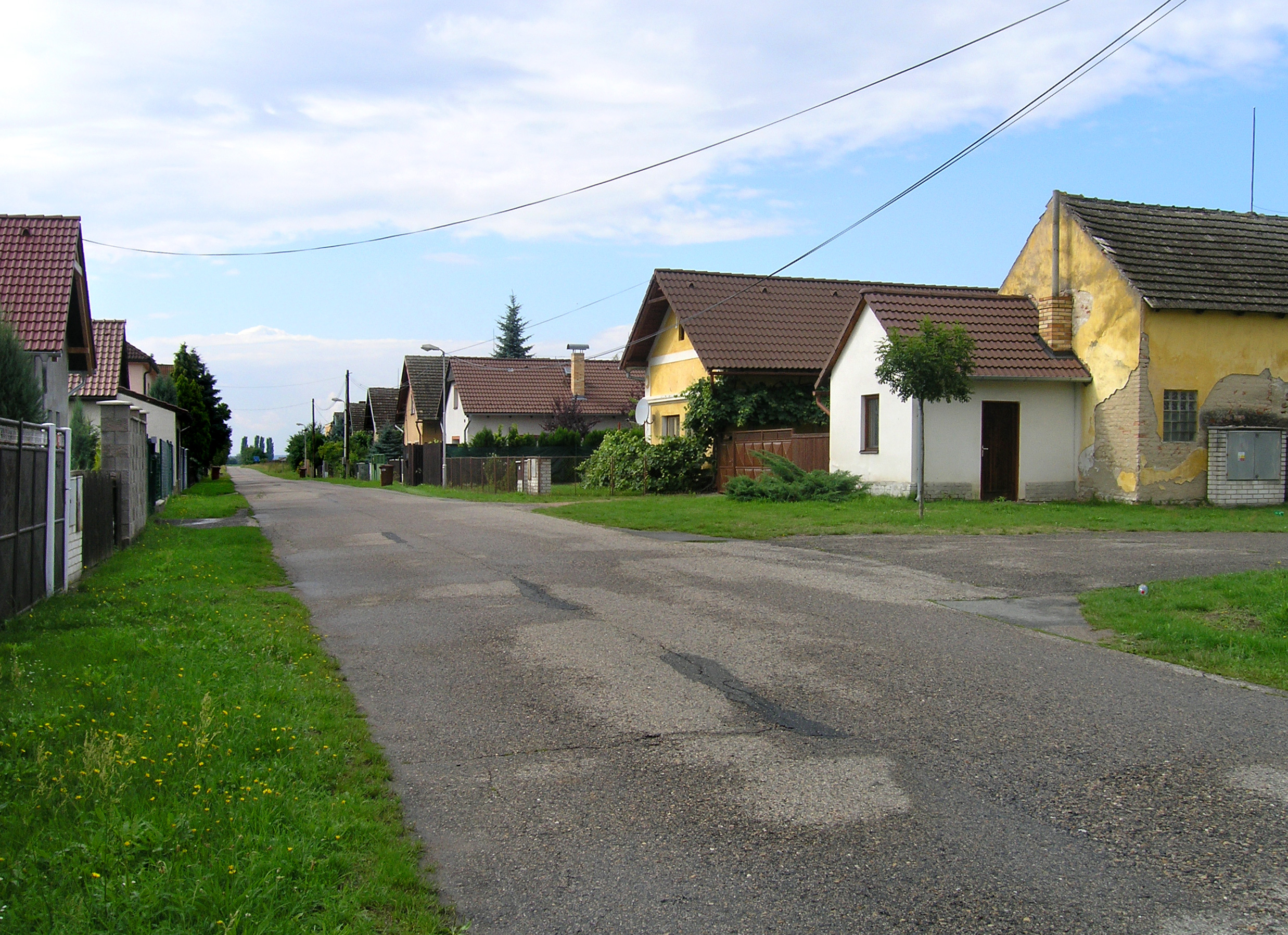
- Northern part of Horka I

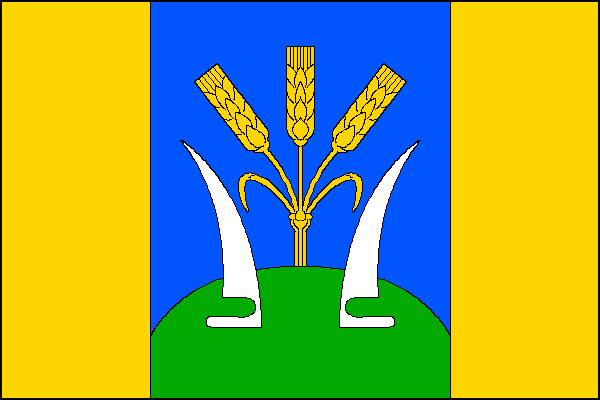
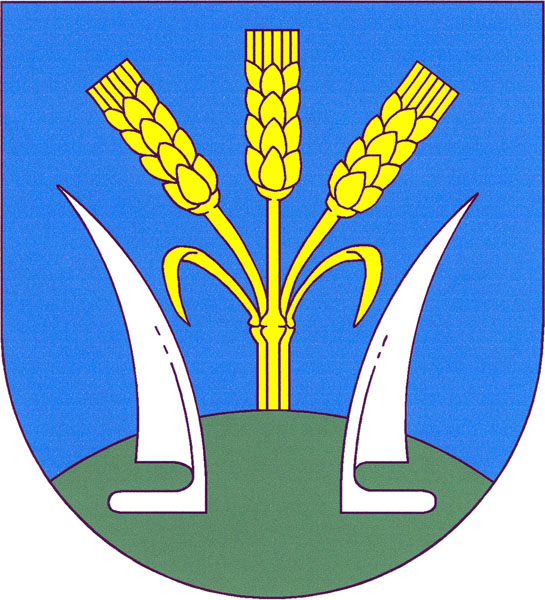
- Flag Coat of arms

- Location in the Czech Republic
- Coordinates: 49°58′58″N 15°26′24″E
- Country: Czech Republic
- Region: Central Bohemian
- District: Kutná Hora
- First mentioned: 1318

Area
  - Total: 6.94 km^{2} (2.68 sq mi)
- Elevation: 211 m (692 ft)

Population (2026-01-01)
  - Total: 408
  - Density: 58.8/km^{2} (152/sq mi)
- Time zone: UTC+1 (CET)
  - Summer (DST): UTC+2 (CEST)
- Postal code: 286 01
- Website: www.horka1.cz

Horka I is a municipality and village in Kutná Hora District in the Central Bohemian Region of the Czech Republic. It has about 400 inhabitants.

The Roman numeral in the name serves to distinguish it from the nearby municipality of the same name, Horka II.

== Administrative division ==
Horka I consists of three municipal parts (in brackets population according to the 2021 census):

- Horka I (131)
- Borek (37)
- Svobodná Ves (214)

== Demographics ==
Historical population
Year	Pop.	±%
1869	793	—
1880	757	−4.5%
1890	731	−3.4%
1900	727	−0.5%
1910	708	−2.6%
1921	713	+0.7%
1930	708	−0.7%
1950	557	−21.3%
1961	566	+1.6%
1970	499	−11.8%
1980	482	−3.4%
1991	420	−12.9%
2001	417	−0.7%
2011	382	−8.4%
2021	382	+0.0%
Source: Censuses
