= Kladeruby nad Oslavou =

- Municipality
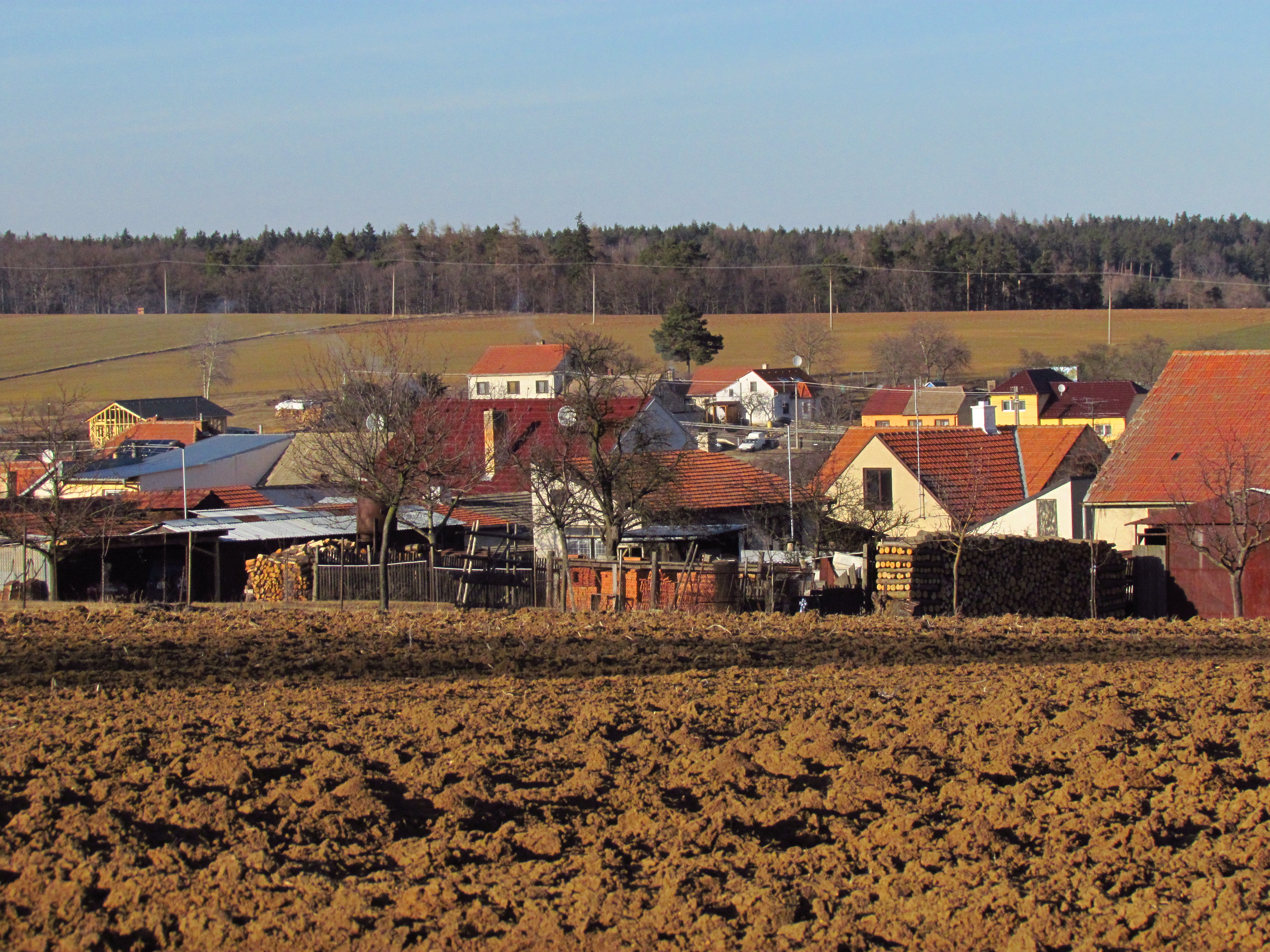
- General view

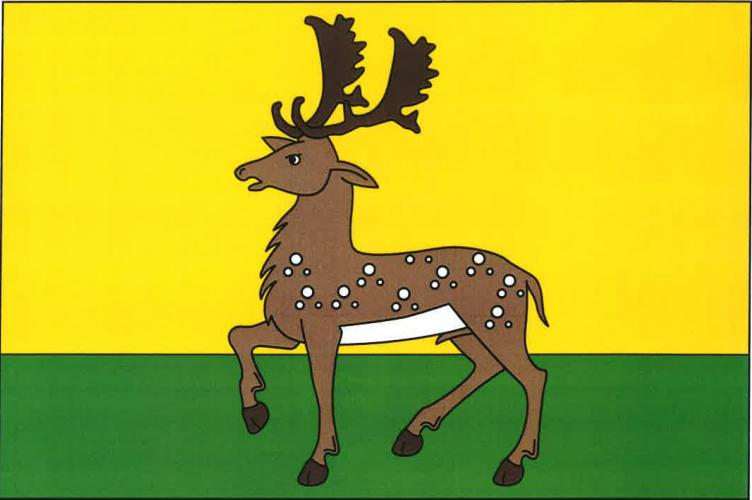
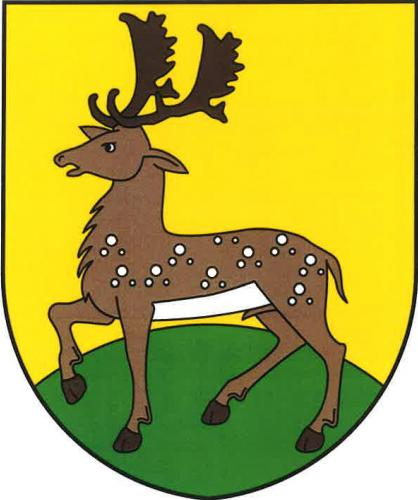
- Flag Coat of arms

- Location in the Czech Republic
- Coordinates: 49°8′41″N 16°10′18″E
- Country: Czech Republic
- Region: Vysočina
- District: Třebíč
- First mentioned: 1368

Area
  - Total: 12.76 km^{2} (4.93 sq mi)
- Elevation: 395 m (1,296 ft)

Population (2026-01-01)
  - Total: 211
  - Density: 16.5/km^{2} (42.8/sq mi)
- Time zone: UTC+1 (CET)
  - Summer (DST): UTC+2 (CEST)
- Postal code: 675 75
- Website: www.kladerubynadoslavou.cz

Kladeruby nad Oslavou is a municipality and village in Třebíč District in the Vysočina Region of the Czech Republic. It has about 200 inhabitants.

Kladeruby nad Oslavou lies approximately 23 kilometres (14 mi) east of Třebíč, 51 km (32 mi) south-east of Jihlava, and 164 km (102 mi) south-east of Prague.

== Demographics ==
Historical population
Year	Pop.	±%
1869	159	—
1880	222	+39.6%
1890	246	+10.8%
1900	256	+4.1%
1910	227	−11.3%
1921	226	−0.4%
1930	259	+14.6%
1950	220	−15.1%
1961	219	−0.5%
1970	224	+2.3%
1980	206	−8.0%
1991	201	−2.4%
2001	194	−3.5%
2011	200	+3.1%
2021	190	−5.0%
Source: Censuses
