= Přišimasy =

- Municipality
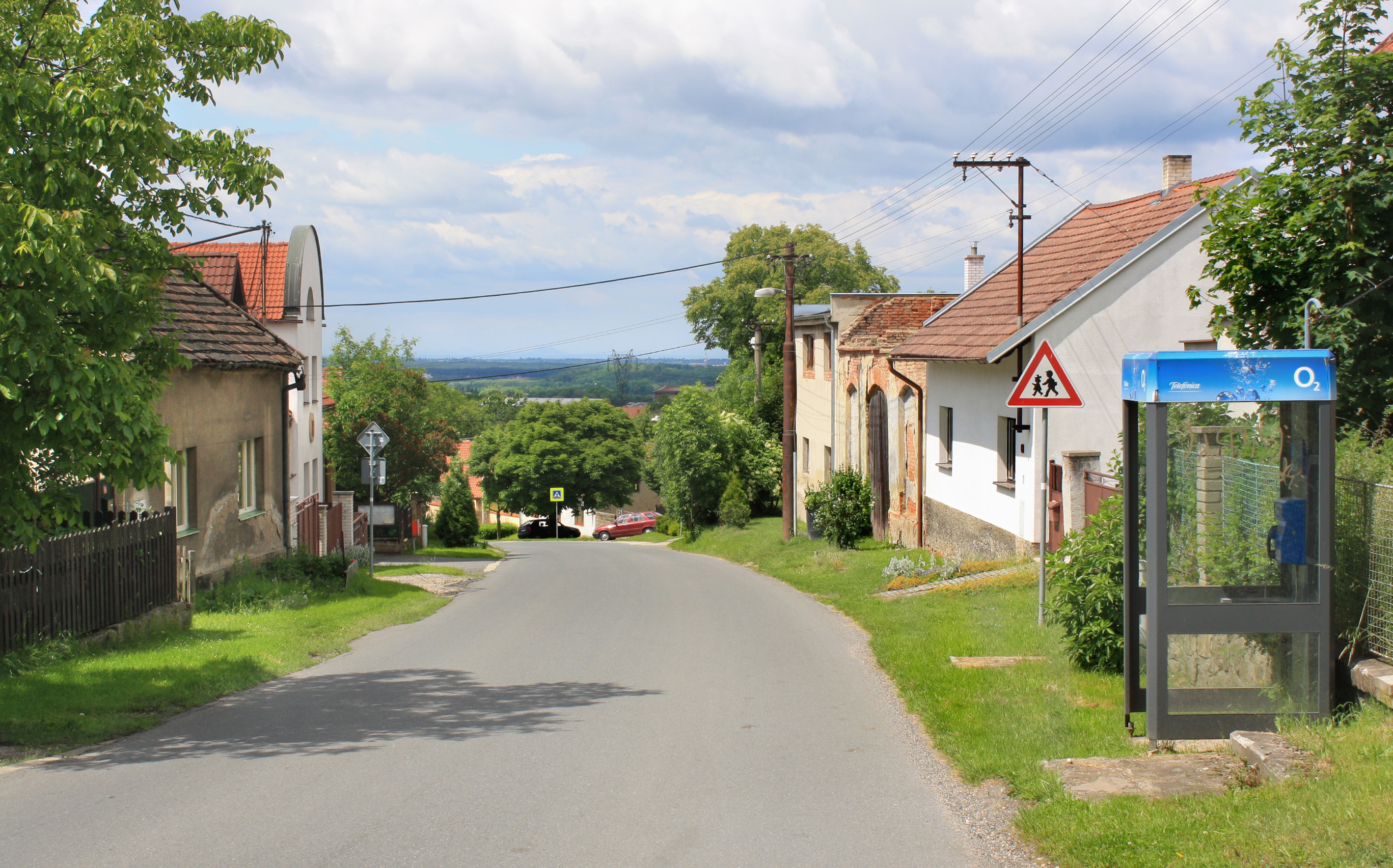
- Main street

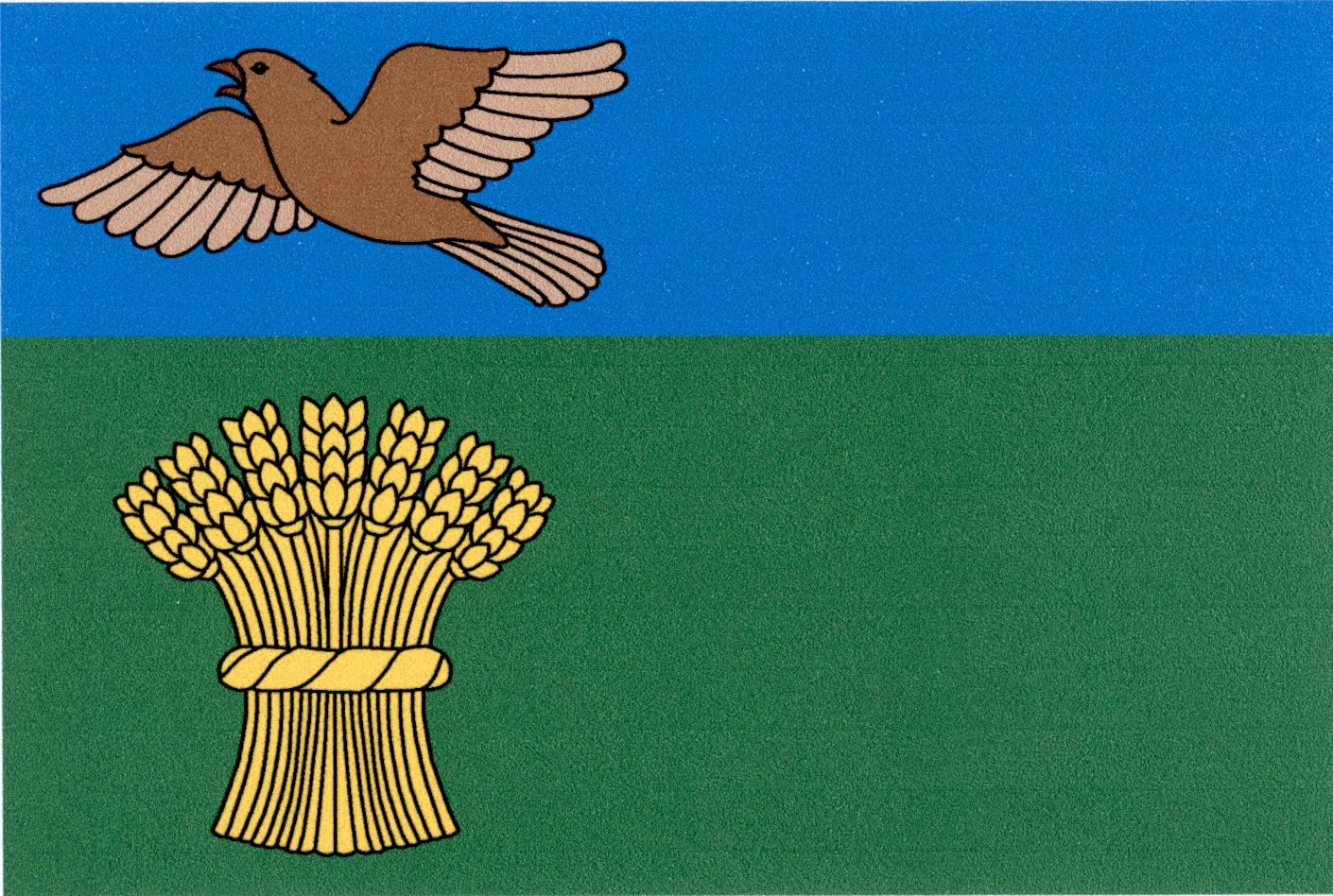
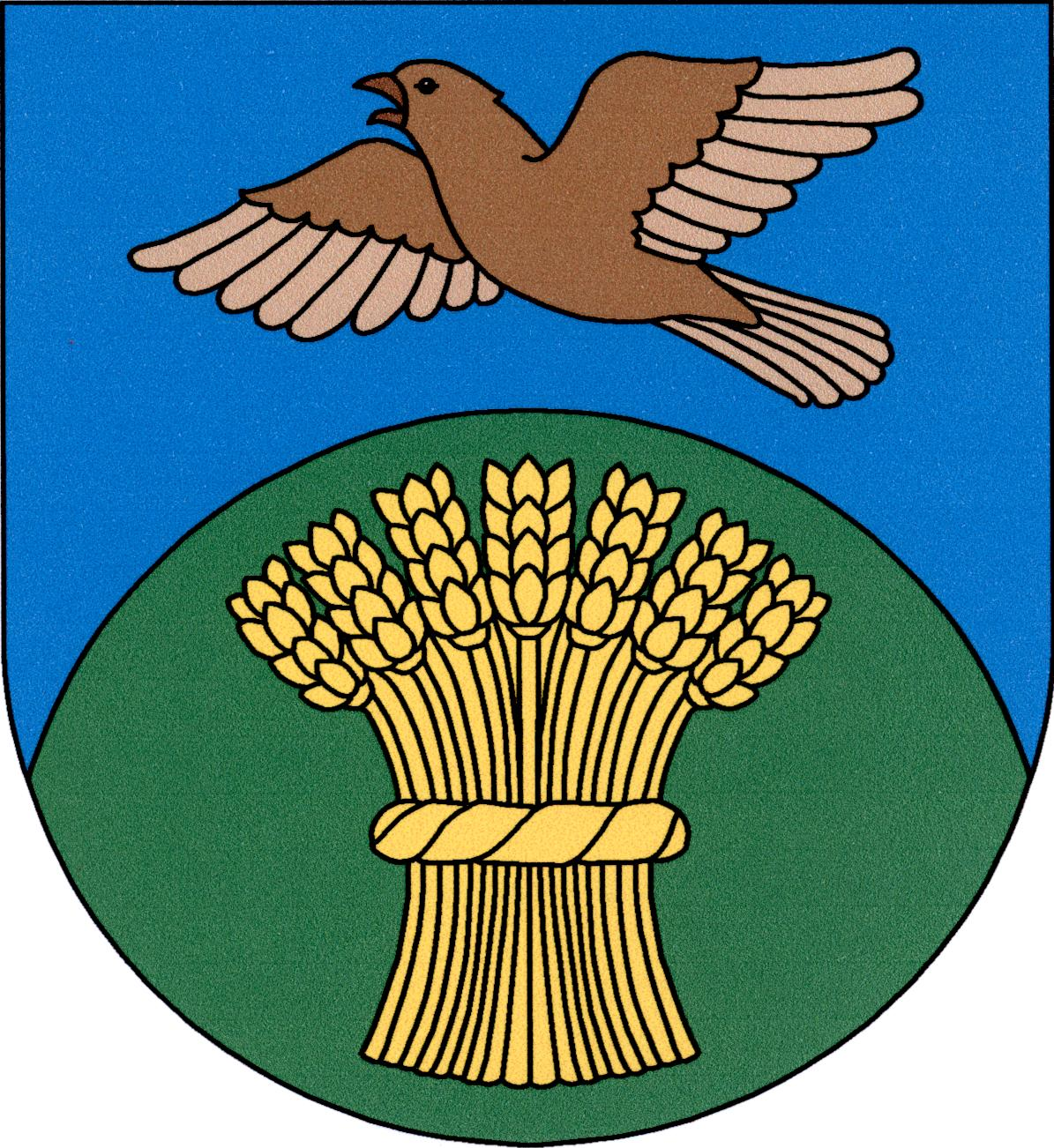
- Flag Coat of arms

- Location in the Czech Republic
- Coordinates: 50°3′2″N 14°45′44″E
- Country: Czech Republic
- Region: Central Bohemian
- District: Kolín
- First mentioned: 1309

Area
  - Total: 6.99 km^{2} (2.70 sq mi)
- Elevation: 336 m (1,102 ft)

Population (2026-01-01)
  - Total: 889
  - Density: 127/km^{2} (329/sq mi)
- Time zone: UTC+1 (CET)
  - Summer (DST): UTC+2 (CEST)
- Postal code: 281 72
- Website: www.prisimasy.cz

Přišimasy is a municipality and village in Kolín District in the Central Bohemian Region of the Czech Republic. It has about 900 inhabitants.

== Administrative division ==
Přišimasy consists of three municipal parts (in brackets population according to the 2021 census):

- Přišimasy (478)
- Horka (144)
- Skřivany (262)

== Demographics ==
Historical population
Year	Pop.	±%
1869	649	—
1880	786	+21.1%
1890	806	+2.5%
1900	765	−5.1%
1910	876	+14.5%
1921	878	+0.2%
1930	942	+7.3%
1950	705	−25.2%
1961	699	−0.9%
1970	609	−12.9%
1980	490	−19.5%
1991	448	−8.6%
2001	445	−0.7%
2011	726	+63.1%
2021	884	+21.8%
Source: Censuses
