= Horky (Svitavy District) =

- Municipality
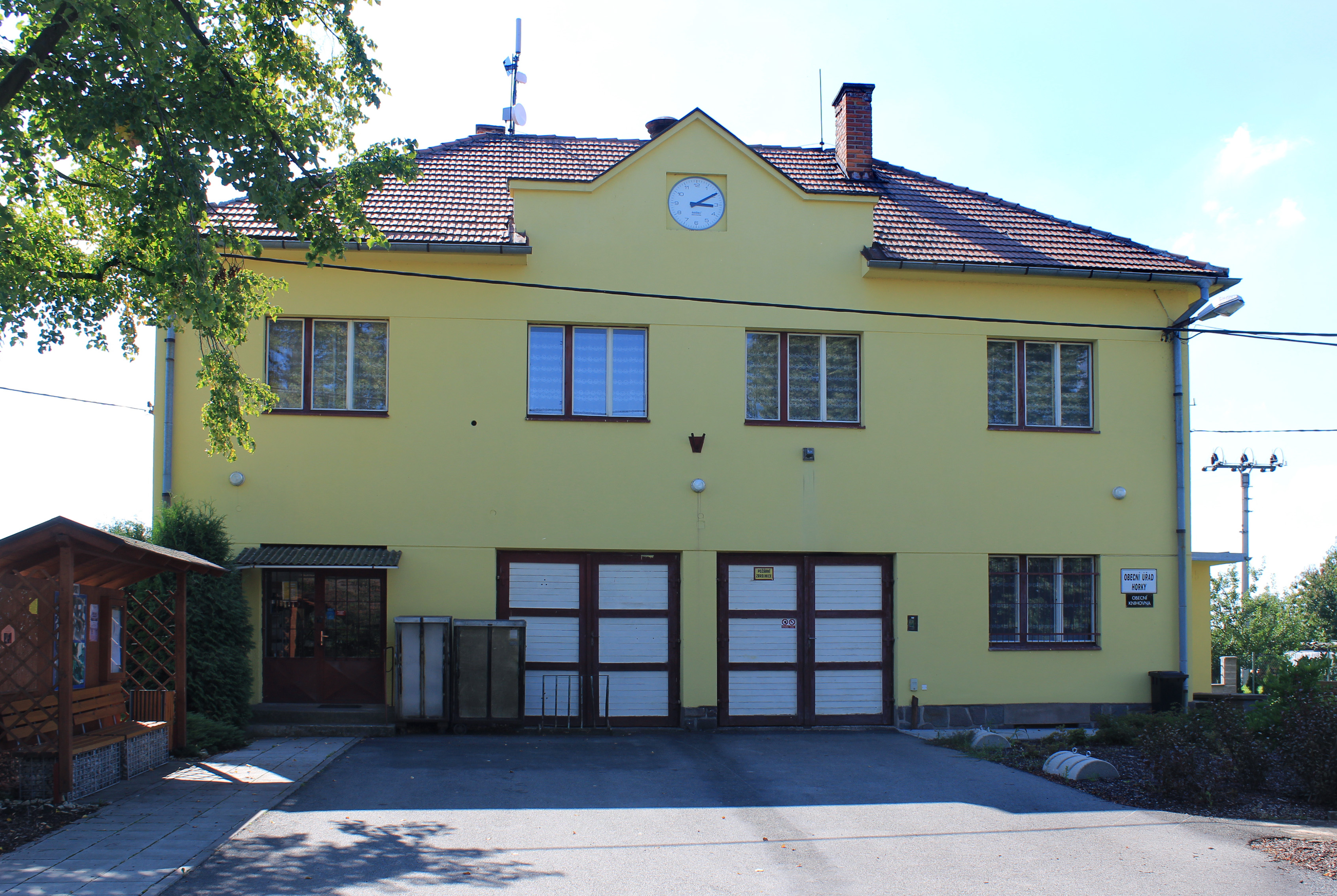
- Municipal office

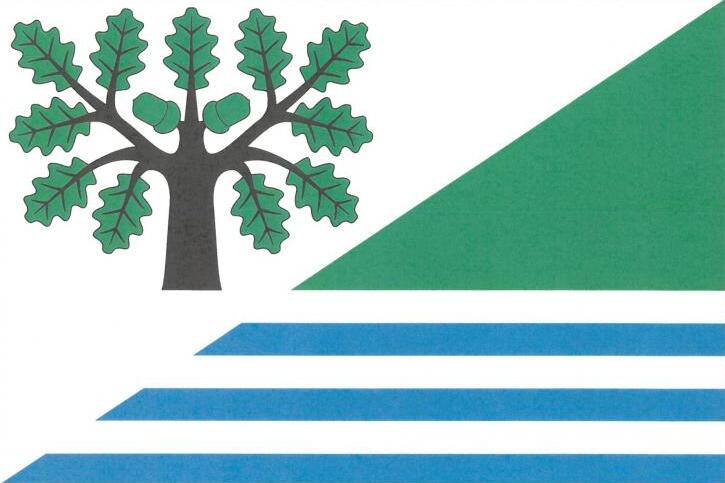
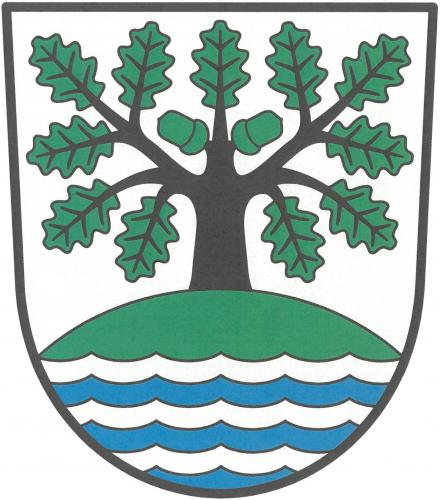
- Flag Coat of arms

- Location in the Czech Republic
- Coordinates: 49°55′15″N 16°14′36″E
- Country: Czech Republic
- Region: Pardubice
- District: Svitavy
- First mentioned: 1226

Area
  - Total: 2.67 km^{2} (1.03 sq mi)
- Elevation: 337 m (1,106 ft)

Population (2026-01-01)
  - Total: 146
  - Density: 54.7/km^{2} (142/sq mi)
- Time zone: UTC+1 (CET)
  - Summer (DST): UTC+2 (CEST)
- Postal code: 570 01
- Website: www.horkyulitomysle.cz

Horky is a municipality and village in Svitavy District in the Pardubice Region of the Czech Republic. It has about 100 inhabitants.

Horky lies approximately 25 kilometres (16 mi) north-west of Svitavy, 36 km (22 mi) east of Pardubice, and 132 km (82 mi) east of Prague.

== Demographics ==
Historical population
Year	Pop.	±%
1869	287	—
1880	344	+19.9%
1890	317	−7.8%
1900	296	−6.6%
1910	290	−2.0%
1921	286	−1.4%
1930	259	−9.4%
1950	205	−20.8%
1961	188	−8.3%
1970	156	−17.0%
1980	118	−24.4%
1991	116	−1.7%
2001	107	−7.8%
2011	108	+0.9%
2021	131	+21.3%
Source: Censuses
