= Horka II =

- Municipality
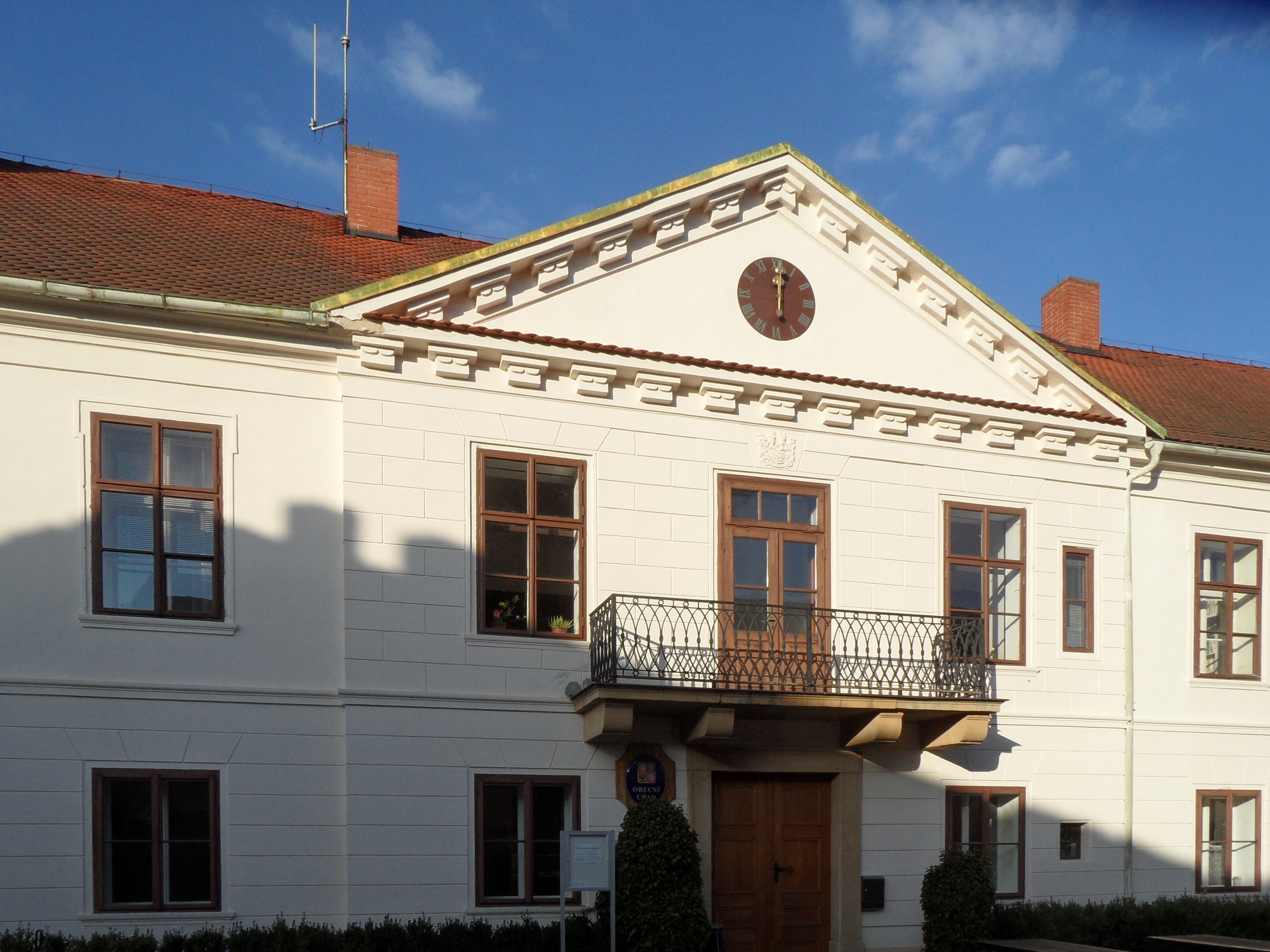
- Horka Castle, today the municipal office

- Location in the Czech Republic
- Coordinates: 49°43′56″N 15°8′2″E
- Country: Czech Republic
- Region: Central Bohemian
- District: Kutná Hora
- First mentioned: 1305

Area
  - Total: 10.23 km^{2} (3.95 sq mi)
- Elevation: 348 m (1,142 ft)

Population (2026-01-01)
  - Total: 415
  - Density: 40.6/km^{2} (105/sq mi)
- Time zone: UTC+1 (CET)
  - Summer (DST): UTC+2 (CEST)
- Postal code: 285 22
- Website: www.obec-horkaii.cz

Horka II is a municipality and village in Kutná Hora District in the Central Bohemian Region of the Czech Republic. It has about 400 inhabitants.

The Roman numeral in the name serves to distinguish it from the nearby municipality of the same name, Horka I.

== Administrative division ==
Horka II consists of five municipal parts (in brackets population according to the 2021 census):

- Horka II (229)
- Buda (41)
- Čejtice (38)
- Hrádek (0)
- Onšovec (75)

== Geography ==
The municipality lies on the shore of Švihov Reservoir, which was built on the Želivka River. The Sázava River flows through the municipality.

== Demographics ==
Historical population
Year	Pop.	±%
1869	835	—
1880	860	+3.0%
1890	746	−13.3%
1900	699	−6.3%
1910	770	+10.2%
1921	768	−0.3%
1930	657	−14.5%
1950	578	−12.0%
1961	634	+9.7%
1970	575	−9.3%
1980	499	−13.2%
1991	425	−14.8%
2001	399	−6.1%
2011	388	−2.8%
2021	383	−1.3%
Source: Censuses
