= Kamenná Horka =

- Municipality
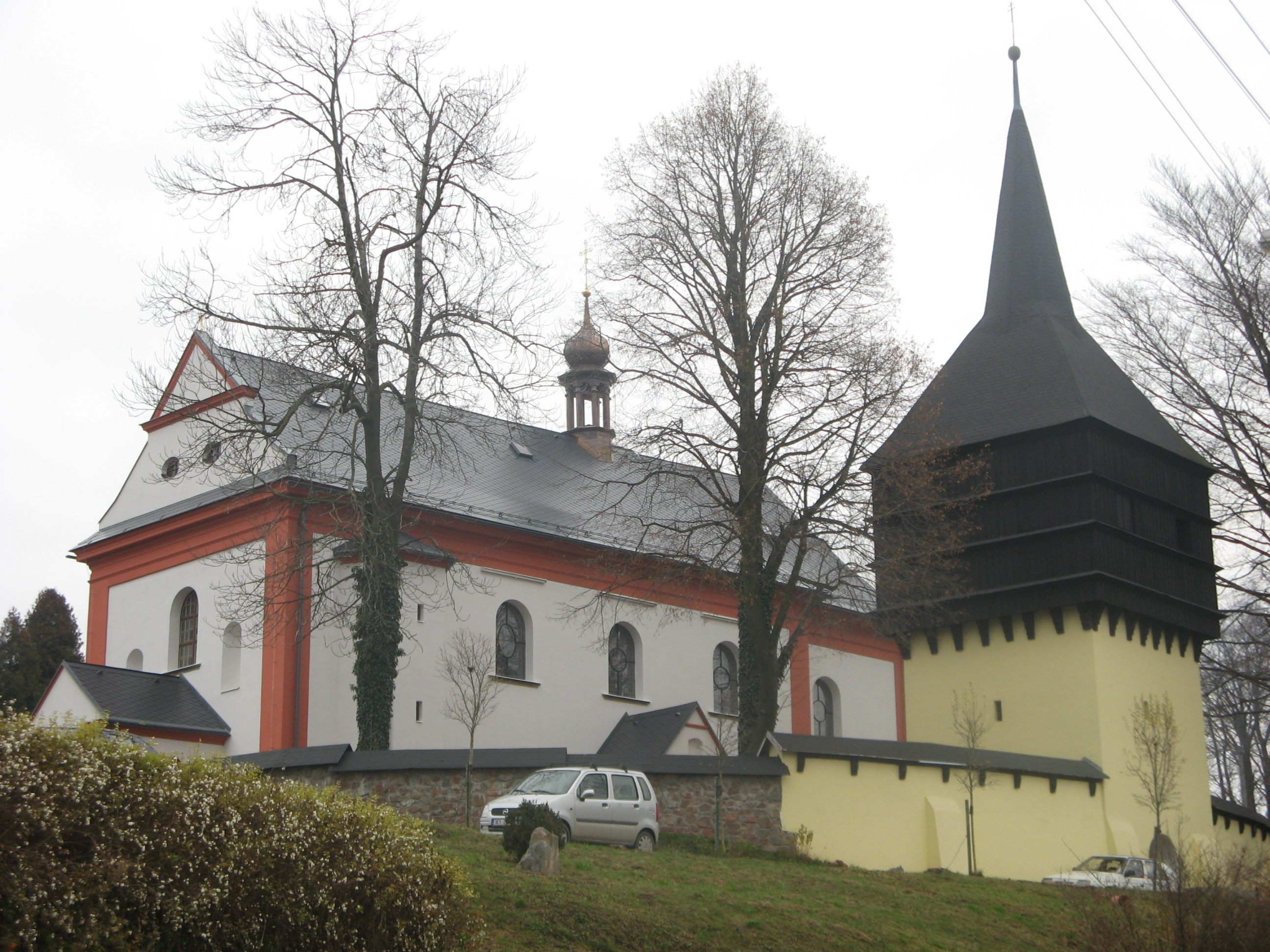
- Church of Saint Mary Magdalene

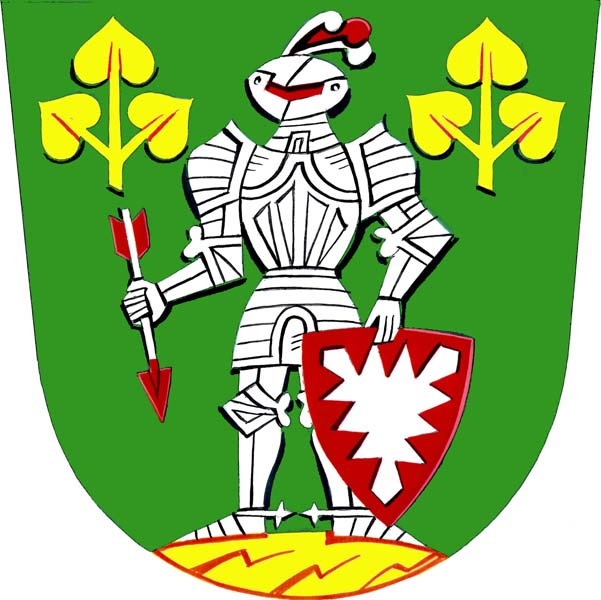
- Flag Coat of arms

- Location in the Czech Republic
- Coordinates: 49°44′17″N 16°31′26″E
- Country: Czech Republic
- Region: Pardubice
- District: Svitavy
- First mentioned: 1270

Area
  - Total: 15.74 km^{2} (6.08 sq mi)
- Elevation: 521 m (1,709 ft)

Population (2026-01-01)
  - Total: 371
  - Density: 23.6/km^{2} (61.0/sq mi)
- Time zone: UTC+1 (CET)
  - Summer (DST): UTC+2 (CEST)
- Postal code: 568 02
- Website: www.obeckamennahorka.cz

Kamenná Horka (German: Hermersdorf) is a municipality and village in Svitavy District in the Pardubice Region of the Czech Republic. It has about 400 inhabitants.

== Geography ==
Kamenná Horka is located about 4 kilometres (2 mi) east of Svitavy and 57 km (35 mi) north of Brno, on the border between the historical lands of Bohemia and Moravia. It lies in the Svitavy Uplands.

== Demographics ==
Historical population
| Year | Pop. | ±% |
|---|---|---|
| 1869 | 1,194 | — |
| 1880 | 1,163 | −2.6% |
| 1890 | 1,174 | +0.9% |
| 1900 | 1,150 | −2.0% |
| 1910 | 1,078 | −6.3% |
| 1921 | 1,065 | −1.2% |
| 1930 | 1,095 | +2.8% |
| 1950 | 496 | −54.7% |
| 1961 | 386 | −22.2% |
| 1970 | 367 | −4.9% |
| 1980 | 332 | −9.5% |
| 1991 | 312 | −6.0% |
| 2001 | 298 | −4.5% |
| 2011 | 292 | −2.0% |
| 2021 | 295 | +1.0% |
Source: Censuses
