= Gorica, Konjic =

Gorica Горица
- Village
- Location within Bosnia and Herzegovina
- Coordinates: 43.71239321990259°N 17.833578482069356°E
- Country: Bosnia and Herzegovina
- Entity: Federation of Bosnia and Herzegovina
- Canton: Herzegovina-Neretva
- Municipality: Konjic

Area
  - Total: 1.02 sq mi (2.64 km^{2})

Population (2013)
  - Total: 86
  - Density: 84/sq mi (33/km^{2})
- Time zone: UTC+1 (CET)
  - Summer (DST): UTC+2 (CEST)

Gorica (Cyrillic: Горица) is a village in the municipality of Konjic, Bosnia and Herzegovina.

== Name ==
The name of this village means "small mountain" in the native language

== Demographics ==
According to the 2013 census, its population was 86.

Ethnicity in 2013
Ethnicity	Number	Percentage
Bosniaks	81	94.2%
Croats	4	4.7%
other/undeclared	1	1.2%
Total	86	100%
