= Gorica (Zenica) =

Gorica Горица
- Village
- Location within Bosnia and Herzegovina
- Coordinates: 44°9′9.5″N 17°58′11″E
- Country: Bosnia and Herzegovina
- Entity: Federation of Bosnia and Herzegovina
- Canton: Zenica-Doboj
- Municipality: Zenica

Area
  - Total: 1.71 sq mi (4.42 km^{2})

Population (2013)
  - Total: 686
  - Density: 402/sq mi (155/km^{2})
- Time zone: UTC+1 (CET)
  - Summer (DST): UTC+2 (CEST)

Gorica (Cyrillic: Горица) is a village in the City of Zenica, Bosnia and Herzegovina.

== Demographics ==
According to the 2013 census, its population was 686.

Ethnicity in 2013
Ethnicity	Number	Percentage
Bosniaks	680	99.1%
other/undeclared	6	0.9%
Total	686	100%
