= Horky (Kutná Hora District) =

- Municipality
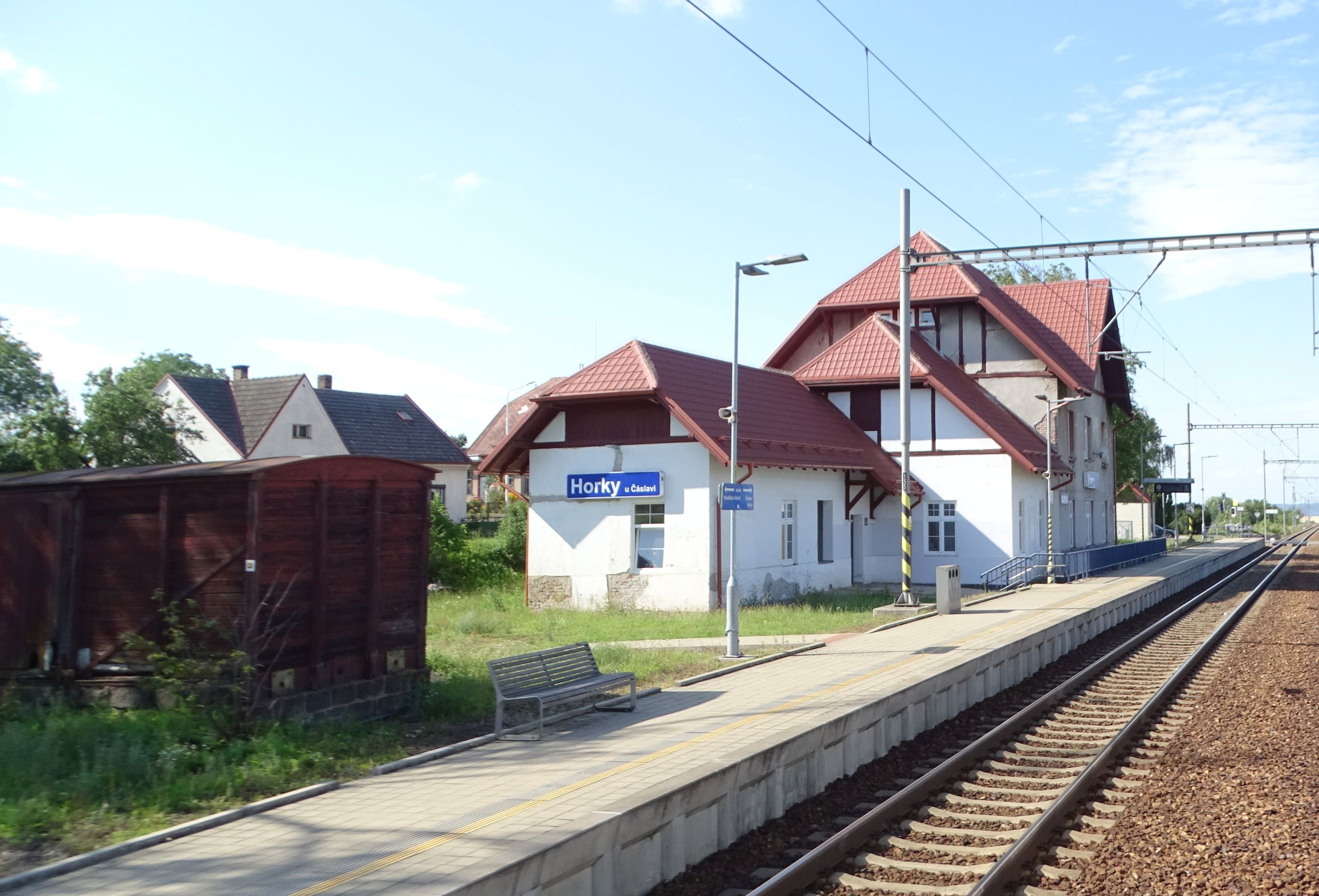
- Train station

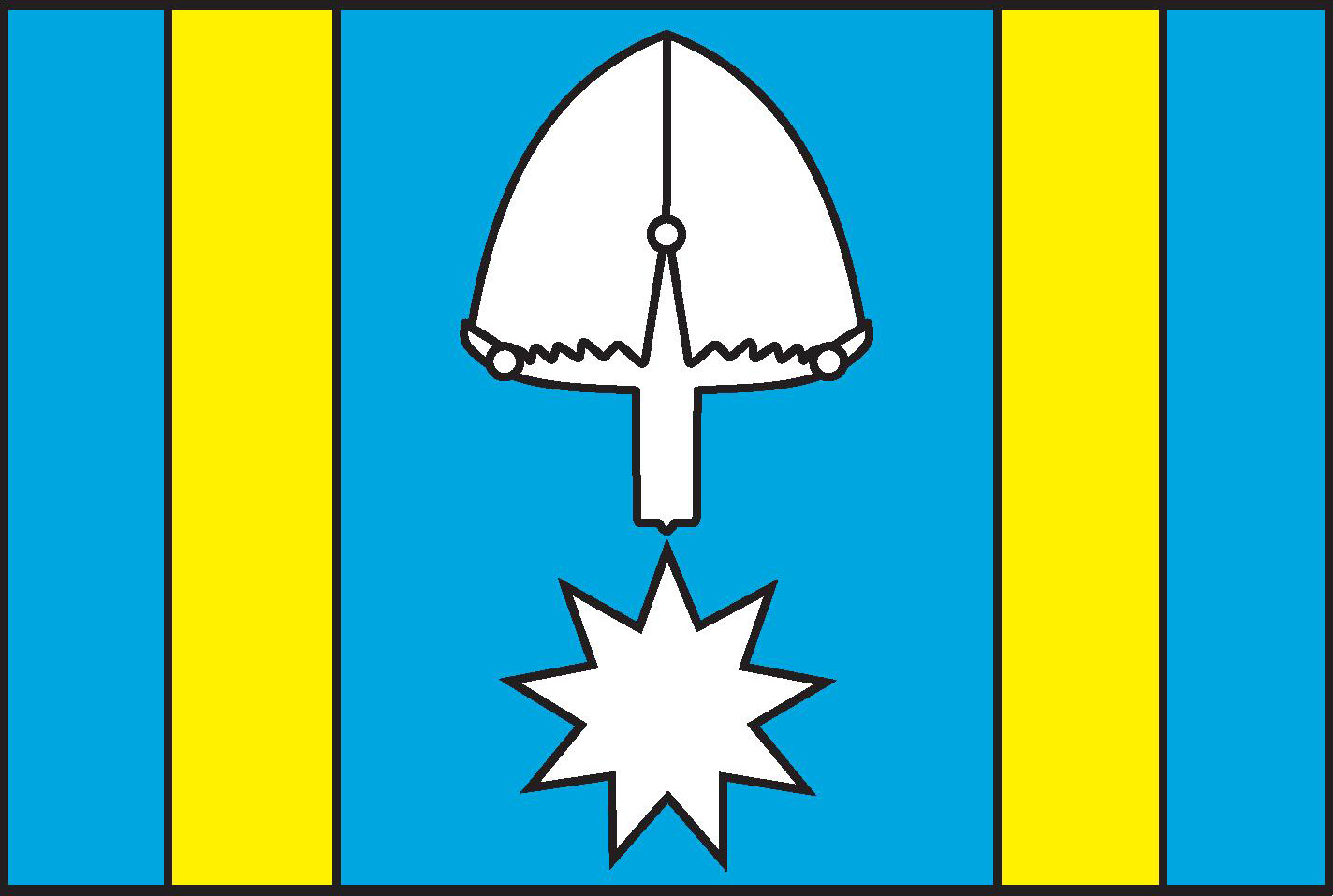
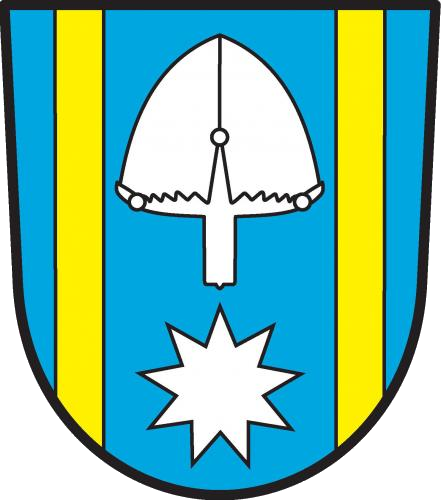
- Flag Coat of arms

- Location in the Czech Republic
- Coordinates: 49°52′8″N 15°26′23″E
- Country: Czech Republic
- Region: Central Bohemian
- District: Kutná Hora
- First mentioned: 1268

Area
  - Total: 2.35 km^{2} (0.91 sq mi)
- Elevation: 297 m (974 ft)

Population (2026-01-01)
  - Total: 383
  - Density: 163/km^{2} (422/sq mi)
- Time zone: UTC+1 (CET)
  - Summer (DST): UTC+2 (CEST)
- Postal code: 286 01
- Website: www.horkyucaslavi.cz

Horky is a municipality and village in Kutná Hora District in the Central Bohemian Region of the Czech Republic. It has about 400 inhabitants.

== Etymology ==
The name Horky is the diminutive plural of the Czech word hora ('mountain'). The word horka often referred to a hill covered with forest or a hill where mining was taking place.

== Geography ==
Horky is located about 15 kilometres (9 mi) southeast of Kutná Hora and 29 km (18 mi) southwest of Pardubice. It lies in a flat agricultural landscape in the Central Elbe Table.

== History ==
The first written mention of Horky is from 1268. In the 14th century, the village was divided into two parts with different owners. One part belonged to the Chlum estate and later Žleby estate. The other part was owned by various burghers and lesser noblemen. They resided in a fortress, first mentioned in 1454.

In 1532, the town of Čáslav acquired the entire Horky. The fortress fell into disrepair and disappeared. Čáslav owned the village until 1623, when it was bought by Albrecht von Wallenstein and annexed to the Žleby estate. From 1634 to 1739, Horky was part of the Tupadly estate. From 1739 until the establishment of an independent municipality in 1848, Horky again belonged to the Žleby estate.

== Demographics ==
Historical population

Year	Pop.	±%
1869	99	—
1880	135	+36.4%
1890	149	+10.4%
1900	141	−5.4%
1910	133	−5.7%

Year	Pop.	±%
1921	149	+12.0%
1930	245	+64.4%
1950	301	+22.9%
1961	404	+34.2%
1970	415	+2.7%

Year	Pop.	±%
1980	362	−12.8%
1991	390	+7.7%
2001	399	+2.3%
2011	351	−12.0%
2021	380	+8.3%

Source: Censuses

== Transport ==
The I/38 road (the section from Havlíčkův Brod to Kutná Hora) runs through the municipality.

Horky is located on the railway line Kolín–Havlíčkův Brod.

== Sights ==
The main landmark of Horky is the Church of Saint Wenceslaus. It was originally a Romanesque building, mentioned in 1268 as a parish church. Around 1753, it was rebuilt in the Baroque style.
