= Ludmila Hořká =

Czech ethnographer and writer

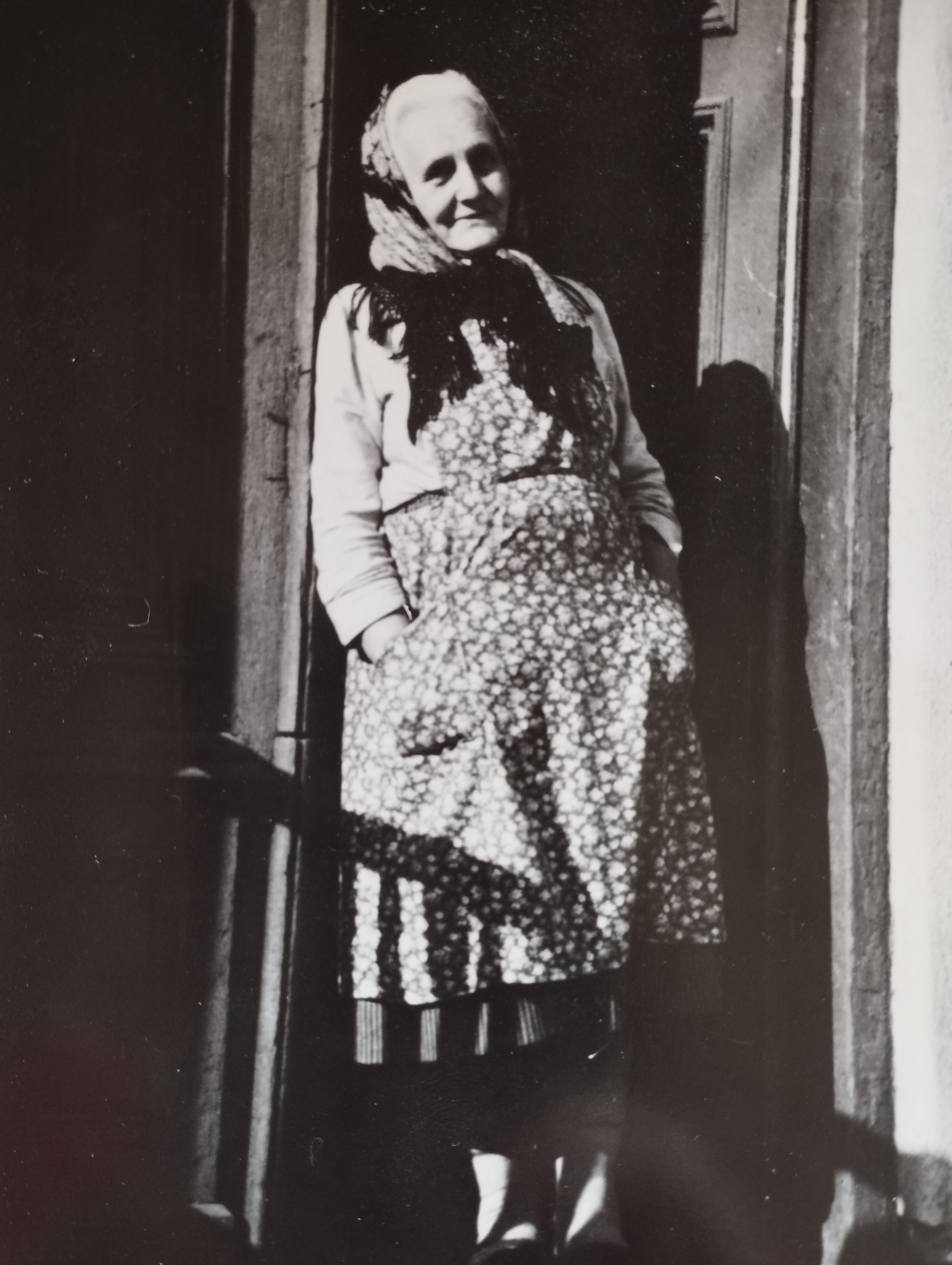
- Born: Marie Holubková; 26 April 1892; Dvořisko, Silesia, Austria-Hungary
- Died: 4 October 1966 (aged 74); Opava, Czechoslovakia

Marie Šindelářová (birth name Marie Holubková; 26 April 1892 – 4 October 1966), also known by her pseudonym Ludmila Hořká, was a Czech ethnographer, writer and poet. Šindelářová was known for using folk phrases and a Lach dialect in her work.

== Early life and adulthood ==
Marie Holubková was born in Dvořisko, Silesia, Austria-Hungary (today part of Kravaře), to the family of an innkeeper Benjamin Holubek and Johanna, née Heidrová. Her mother died soon in 1903, living with her aunt after her father remarried. Holubková obtained a primary education from a German school in Kravaře and a Czech school in Štítina. She also received lessons from nuns in Kravaře, which were intended to prepare girls for motherhood and being a housewife.

After her father's death, Holubková ran his inn. Holubková married Vincenc Šumník, but was widowed due to World War I. She had a son and a daughter–her third child died upon the birth. She married František Šindelář in 1919, later having three sons and five daughters together.

== Career ==
Šindelářová joined the ethnographic association Sedlišťané in Kravaře in 1920, later becoming head of the branch. In 1925, Šindelářová began publishing lyrical poems in Czech and the Lach dialect. She founded and led an offshoot of Sedlišťané – an ethnographic association. Šindelářová promoted the culture of the Hlučín Region with Joža Vochala, participating in meetings with the president of Czechoslovakia.

In 1937, Šindelářová presented Hlučín folklore in Prague. She was provided asylum by Petr Bezruč during the Nazi occupation of Hlučín, creating a dance ensemble during her time in asylum. The Gestapo eventually arrested Šindelářová for her activities during First Czechoslovak Republic when she returned to Dvořisko. The Gestapo briefly imprisoned Šindelářová in Opava, distroying some of her manuscripts in a raid on her home. Šindelářová returned to her Šindelářová after the end of World War II.

Šindelářová began writing under the pseudonym Ludmila Hořká, using folk phrases and a Lach dialect in her work. Šindelářová published her autobiographical novel, Doma ('At Home'), in 1943, which depicted her life on the border of Austria-Hungary and German Empire until World War I started. Šindelářová died on 4 October 1966, in a hospital in Opava.
