= Dolní Hořice =

- Municipality
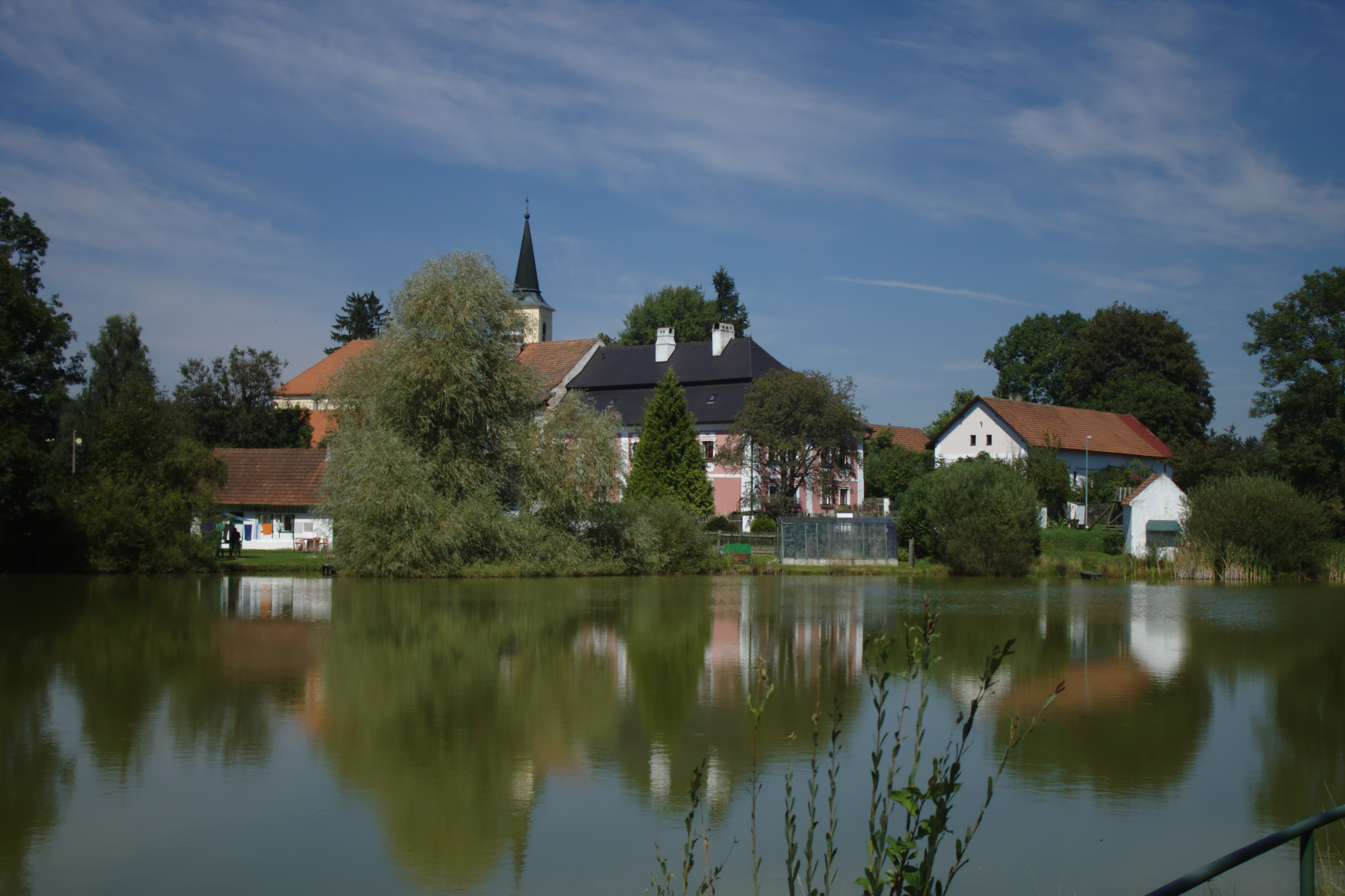
- Hartvíkov, a part of Dolní Hořice

- Flag Coat of arms

- Location in the Czech Republic
- Coordinates: 49°26′8″N 14°51′2″E
- Country: Czech Republic
- Region: South Bohemian
- District: Tábor
- First mentioned: 1403

Area
  - Total: 39.10 km^{2} (15.10 sq mi)
- Elevation: 554 m (1,818 ft)

Population (2026-01-01)
  - Total: 859
  - Density: 22.0/km^{2} (56.9/sq mi)
- Time zone: UTC+1 (CET)
  - Summer (DST): UTC+2 (CEST)
- Postal code: 391 55
- Website: www.dolnihorice.cz

Dolní Hořice (German: Unter Horschitz) is a municipality and village in Tábor District in the South Bohemian Region of the Czech Republic. It has about 900 inhabitants.

Dolní Hořice lies approximately 14 kilometres (9 mi) east of Tábor, 58 km (36 mi) north-east of České Budějovice, and 79 km (49 mi) south-east of Prague.

== Administrative division ==
Dolní Hořice consists of 12 municipal parts (in brackets population according to the 2021 census):

- Dolní Hořice (118)
- Chotčiny (82)
- Hartvíkov (17)
- Horní Hořice (73)
- Kladruby (55)
- Lejčkov (30)
- Mašovice (103)
- Nové Dvory (12)
- Oblajovice (51)
- Pořín (174)
- Prasetín (63)
- Radostovice (23)

== Demographics ==
Historical population
Year	Pop.	±%
1869	2,682	—
1880	2,878	+7.3%
1890	2,797	−2.8%
1900	2,639	−5.6%
1910	2,543	−3.6%
1921	2,452	−3.6%
1930	2,286	−6.8%
1950	1,645	−28.0%
1961	1,548	−5.9%
1970	1,267	−18.2%
1980	1,060	−16.3%
1991	901	−15.0%
2001	823	−8.7%
2011	804	−2.3%
2021	801	−0.4%
Source: Censuses
