= Heinzendorf =

Heinzendorf may refer to:

== Places ==
- Hynčice (German: Heinzendorf bei Halbstadt), municipality in the Okres Náchod, Czech Republic
- Jasienica (Heinzendorf, Kreis Teschen), municipality in the Powiat Bielski, Poland
- Vítějeves (Heinzendorf bei Politschka), municipality in the Okres Svitavy, Czech Republic
- Bagno (Heinzendorf, Kreis Wohlau), urban locality in the municipality Oborniki Śląskie, Powiat Trzebnicki, Poland
- Henčov (Heinzendorf bei Iglau), locality of Jihlava, Okres Jihlava, Czech Republic
- Hynčice pod Sušinou (Heinzendorf unter der Dürren Koppe), locality of Staré Město pod Sněžníkem, Okres Šumperk, Czech Republic
- Hynčice nad Moravou (Heinzendorf an der March), locality of Hanušovice, Okres Šumperk, Czech Republic
- Hynčice u Krnova (Heinzendorf bei Olbersdorf), locality of Město Albrechtice, Okres Bruntál, Czech Republic
- Hynčice u Vražného (Heinzendorf bei Odrau), locality of Vražné, Okres Nový Jičín, Czech Republic
- Jasienica (Heinzendorf, Kreis Münsterberg), urban locality in the municipality Ziębice, Powiat Ząbkowicki, Poland
- Skrzynka (Heinzendorf, Kreis Habelschwerdt), urban locality in the municipality Lądek-Zdrój, Powiat Kłodzki
- Unikowice (Heinzendorf, Kreis Neiße), urban locality in the municipality Paczków, Powiat nyski, Poland
- Witoszyce (Heinzendorf, Kreis Guhrau), urban locality in the municipality Góra, Powiat Górowski, Poland
- Wrociszów (Heinzendorf, Kreis Freystadt), urban locality in the municipality Nowa Sól, Powiat Nowosolski, Poland
- Jędrzychów (Groß-Heinzendorf), urban locality in the municipality Polkowice, Powiat Polkowicki, Poland
- Jędrzychówek (Klein-Heinzendorf), urban locality in the municipality Przemków, Powiat Polkowicki, Poland
- Horní Hynčina (Ober Heinzendorf), locality of Pohledy, Okres Svitavy, Czech Republic
- Hynčina (Unter Heinzendorf), municipality in the Okres Šumperk, Czech Republic
