= Dlouhá Ves =

Dlouhá Ves may refer to places in the Czech Republic:

- Dlouhá Ves (Havlíčkův Brod District), a municipality and village in the Vysočina Region
- Dlouhá Ves (Klatovy District), a municipality and village in the Plzeň Region
- Dlouhá Ves, a village and part of Holčovice in the Moravian-Silesian Region
- Dlouhá Ves, a village and part of Hynčina in the Olomouc Region
- Dlouhá Ves, a village and part of Rychnov nad Kněžnou in the Hradec Králové Region
- Dlouhá Ves, a village and part of Truskovice in the South Bohemian Region
- Dlouhá Ves, a village and part of Vrchoslavice in the Olomouc Region
