= Hynčice =

Hynčice may refer to places in the Czech Republic:

- Hynčice (Náchod District), a municipality and village in the Hradec Králové Region
- Hynčice (Vražné), a village and part of Vražné in the Moravian-Silesian Region
- Hynčice, a village and part of Město Albrechtice in the Moravian-Silesian Region
- Hynčice nad Moravou, a village and part of Hanušovice in the Olomouc Region

== See also ==
- Heinzendorf (disambiguation)
