= Vrazne =

Vrazne may refer to places in the Czech Republic:

- Vražné, a municipality and village in the Moravian-Silesian Region
- Vrážné, a municipality and village in the Pardubice Region
