= Holy Trinity Memorial =

Baroque votive statue in Lądek-Zdrój, Poland

- Pomnik Trójcy Świętej
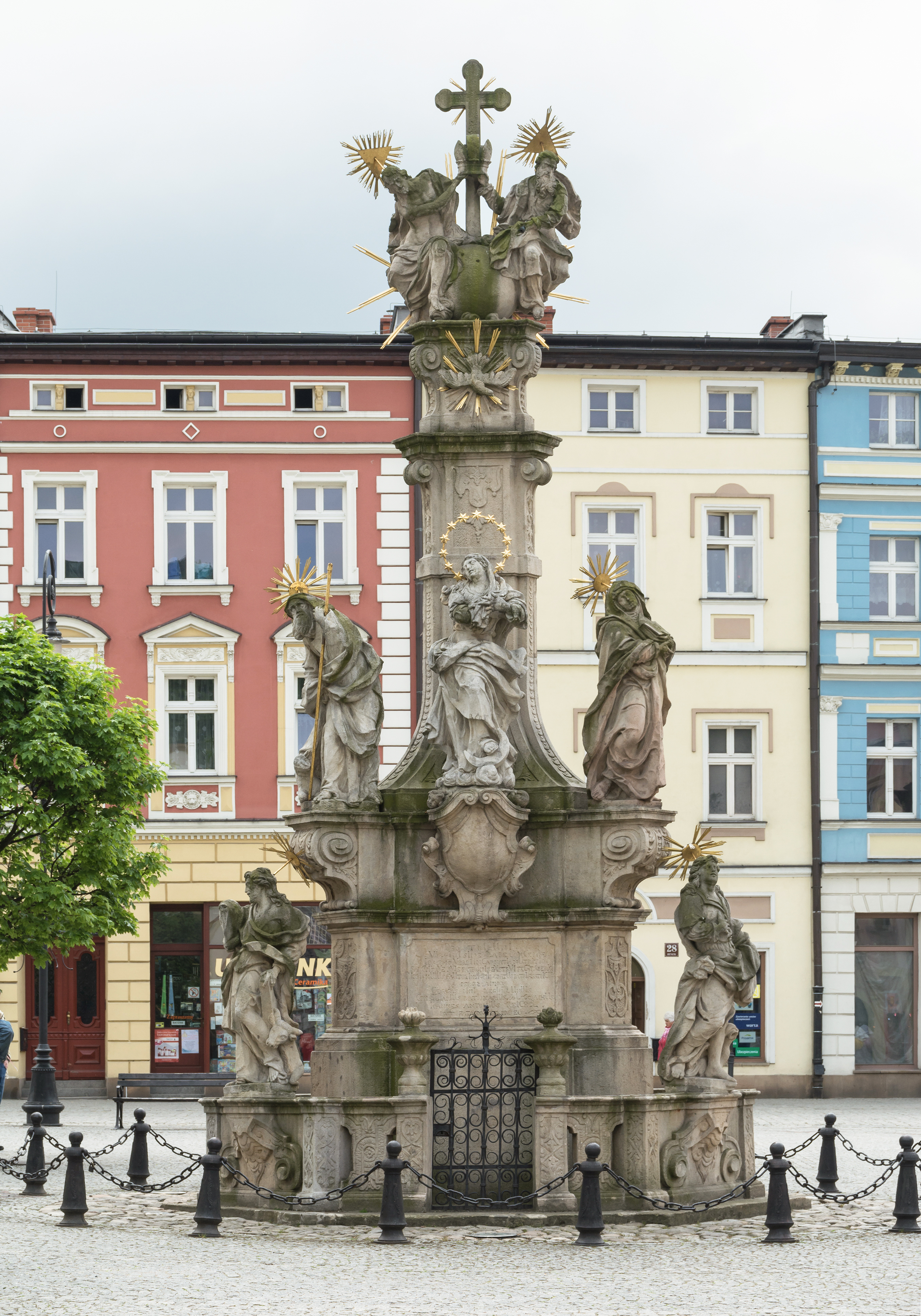
- Holy Trinity statue in Lądek-Zdrój
- Interactive map of Holy Trinity Memorial
- Location: Lądek-Zdrój, Poland
- Coordinates: 50°20′45″N 16°52′18.8″E
- Designer: Michael Klahr the Elder
- Type: Votive statue
- Material: Sandstone
- Height: 7 m (23 ft)
- Beginning date: 1739
- Completion date: 1741
- Restored date: 1873, 1988, 2008

The Holy Trinity Memorial (Polish: Pomnik Trójcy Świętej) is a Baroque votive statue located on the western side of the Lądek-Zdrój Market Square, created between 1739 and 1741 by the sculptor Michael Klahr the Elder.

== History ==
Carved from sandstone, the statue was commissioned by Johann Anton Reichel, a Lądek-Zdrój city councillor, legal advisor, and notary, as a votive offering for the salvation of part of the city from a devastating fire that struck Lądek-Zdrój on the night of 7–8 March 1739.

The Lądek-Zdrój column was first convincingly linked to Klahr the Elder and described in detail, along with surviving designs (a drawing and a bozzetto), by E. Meyer in the work Michael Klahr der Ältere. Sein Leben und Werk, published in Wrocław in 1931.

The composition of Klahr's workshop staff is unknown, but such workshops typically consisted of a master and one to three assistants (journeymen and apprentices). Klahr organized work and commissions, prepared designs, and submitted them to the patron for approval of the final form. He personally created bozzetti and other models for the workshop. In the 1730s, Klahr's workshop produced numerous works, suggesting he employed a larger number of assistants on a permanent basis. Due to the scope of the work and the use of stone – a material less commonly used by Klahr compared to wood – it is assumed that he created the statue with significant involvement from assistants. Comparisons between his design drawing (Note: A drawing of the main (northern) side is known but is currently lost (Gernat (2022, pp. 97–98)).) and sculptural sketch (Note: Until 1945, a terracotta bozzetto of the Mary Immaculate figure was held in Reimann's collection in Lądek-Zdrój (Gernat (2022, pp. 97–98)).) with their realization suggest that Klahr participated in the monument's creation and supervised the remaining work, with his involvement in some tasks limited to finishing more complex elements. The detail work indicates contributions from three individuals with varying skill levels. Klahr is credited with sculpting the most plastic and refined figures: Jesus at the top and Saint John the Evangelist on the balustrade around the pedestal. The first assistant, likely a skilled journeyman, created Saints Luke, Anna, and Joachim, as well as much of the God the Father figure at the top. The second, less skilled assistant crafted the remaining three standing figures – Mary, Saint Joseph, and Saint Anthony. Some details in the execution of Mary, Saint Anthony, and Saint Joseph suggest involvement by the master or the first assistant. The dove representing the Holy Spirit is considered the independent work of the second assistant, who may also have initially shaped the God the Father figure and handled simpler masonry details. It is also assumed that Klahr employed a stonemason responsible for the architectural structure and details such as cornices, volutes, the balustrade, and certain ornaments.

The identities of the sculptors collaborating with Klahr on the statue remain unknown, though it is suggested that Ludwig Andreas Jäschke, a sculptor from Bardo, may have been part of Klahr's workshop team. Johann Joseph Prause likely also passed through Klahr's Lądek-Zdrój workshop. It is difficult to determine Prause's status in the atelier; the most likely hypothesis is that he was an apprentice under the master, though his presence as a journeyman or collaborator cannot be entirely ruled out.

Klahr never saw his final completed (and largest in scale) work in its intended location. He died on 9 March 1742, shortly before the monument was erected in the market square. This claim, popularized by Bernhard Patzak, based on interpreting the chronogram on the statue and comparing it with Klahr's death date, is challenged by Meyer, who points to drawings of the Lądek-Zdrój market square from 1739 showing the statue already in place.

The first restoration of the statue took place in 1873, commemorated by an inscription in German on the back of the pedestal:

German original:	Translation:
Renovirt durch die Stadt Landeck; 1873	Restored by the town of Lądek; 1873

Conservation work was also carried out in 1988.

The immediate surroundings of the statue have changed several times. In the earliest photograph, the statue was surrounded by stone posts connected by chains. From at least the early 20th century, the statue was enclosed by a fenced flower bed, with a steel fence forming a semicircle around the statue and a rectangle on the town hall side. Access to the gate in the balustrade was left open from the main side, and three trees grew on the town hall side. The fence and flower bed remained until at least 1969. Photographs from 1970 and later show no flower bed, with the area around the balustrade paved with stone slabs. After the market square's surface was renovated in 2001, the area around the statue was paved with cobblestones, enclosed by metal posts connected by chains. Originally, some parts of the statue were painted, as shown in photographs from before 1945.

The most recent restoration, funded by the Lower Silesian Voivodeship government, was completed in 2008.

== Composition ==
The statue takes the form of a nearly seven-meter-tall obelisk, surrounded by a richly decorated balustrade, consisting of a wide pedestal supporting a slender pillar. Its composition incorporates numerous Trinitarian elements: (Note: It is possible that Klahr's direct inspiration was the Holy Trinity column erected in Bystrzyca Kłodzka in 1736 by Antoni Jörg (Kalinowski (1986, p. 228)).) the horizontal cross section of both parts of the obelisk is approximately triangular (giving the statue three sides), and each of its three levels features three life-sized sculptures, symmetrically placed at the corners of the cross-section on the first two levels. The northern wall is the main facade, distinguished by a dedicatory plaque, a console with the patron's coat of arms, and the figure of Mary. The balustrade on this side has a gap with a metal gate.

The figures of saints on the first two levels are given a typical Baroque pose of exalted contrapposto – the figures appear frozen in motion, dynamic, emphasized by their massive silhouettes twisted around their own axes, tilted heads, and heavily folded garments. The remaining figures feature calm, less varied poses, representing a continuation of Klahr's "mature" style, oriented toward Prague sculpture, which he developed in the late 1720s and early 1730s.

On the wavy barrier surrounding the main part of the statue stand sculptures of saints:

- Luke the Evangelist (left), with an ox at his feet and a book and palette with three brushes in his right hand. He was a painter and physician, and legend attributes to him the first portrait of the Virgin Mary. He is the patron of painters, artists, and physicians.
- John the Evangelist (right), with an eagle at his feet holding an inkwell in its beak; the saint holds a book in his left hand, dated 1740, likely indicating the figure's completion year. Author of the Book of Revelation, Jesus entrusted him with the care of His mother from the cross. He is the patron of 27 professions, including theologians, writers, and pharmacists.
- Anthony of Padua (rear), in a Franciscan habit, with a book in his right hand. He taught philosophy at the University of Bologna and was known for delivering fervent sermons. He is the patron of marriages, fiancés, and an advocate for lost people and items.

These figures are not directly related to Trinitarian or Marian themes but to the patron – two of them represent his patron saints.

On consoles at the base of the pillar are representations of three figures significant to the Virgin Mary:

- Saint Joachim (left), Mary's father, depicted as a shepherd with a staff, with a lamb at his feet. Patron of parents and grandparents.
- Saint Anne (right), Mary's mother, with a book (symbolizing teaching her daughter to read).
- Saint Joseph (rear), Mary's husband, with his usual attribute – a hatchet. Patron of carpenters, lumberjacks, and craftsmen.

At the central point of the statue, on its main wall, between the pillar's base (representing Earth) and its summit (symbolizing Heaven), above the console with the patron's cartouche, slightly higher than the adjacent figures of Saints Joachim and Anne, Klahr placed the figure of Mary Immaculate with a wreath of 12 apocalyptic stars around her head. The Virgin Mary, with hands clasped to the left and head tilted back to the right, stands on a crescent moon, referencing the Assumption and corresponding to the description in the Book of Revelation.

Below the figure of Mary, in the middle of the pedestal, is the only secular element of the sculpture – a dedicatory plaque. It contains a chronogram with the date encoded in Roman numeral letters (DCCCCCCCCCLLLLXVVVVVVVVVVVVVVVVVVVIIIIIIIIIIIIIIIIIIIIIIIIIIIIIIIIIIIIIIIII) – 1745. The text and its translation from Latin read:

Latin original:	Translation:
Deo trI = VnI; VIrgInI sIne Labe ConCeptae; Iosepho VerbI InCaranatI nVtrItIo sanCtIsqVe sVIs patronIs eXstrVI feCIt et erIgI; VrbIs hVIVs FaVtor InsIgnIs gratsVs patrIae patrICIVs per 32 annos CaesarIs bInI regInae VnIVs; ConsILIarIVs ratIonarIVs, et LogoraphVs; Ioannes AntonIVs ReICheL post fata orate pro eo.	To God, One in Trinity; To the Virgin conceived without sin, To Joseph, nurturer of the Incarnate Word, To his holy patrons, he built and erected this monument A distinguished benefactor of this city, honored as a patrician by a grateful homeland, for 32 years legal advisor and official of two emperors and one queen Johann Anton Reichel; After his death, pray for him.

At the obelisk's summit, symbolizing Heaven, on a globe topped with a cross (a symbol of salvation), sit: on the right, God the Father, depicted as a dignified man with a scepter in his left hand; on the left, at the Father's right hand, Jesus Christ, portrayed as a half-naked young man. Slightly below is the symbol of the Holy Spirit – a dove. The Father and Son together hold a crown above the head of Mary Immaculate with their right hands. This depiction of Mary's coronation during her Assumption is a recurring motif in Counter-Reformation art, responding to the questioning by many Protestant churches of the Virgin Mary's special status in Catholic doctrine.

The Holy Trinity column in Lądek-Zdrój's market square, one of Klahr's later works, exhibits the artist's mature style, oriented toward Prague models. Combining stylistic similarities and Klahr's sketches of figures from Prague's Charles Bridge, researchers suggested Klahr visited Prague, but Meyer demonstrated that these drawings were copies of engravings by Augustin Neuräutter, making a Prague stay unlikely.

Michael Klahr the Elder left another sandstone work, possibly originally intended for the statue's design or as a decoration for his townhouse – the figure of Mater Dolorosa, now in the Michael Klahr the Elder Museum Gallery in Lądek-Zdrój.

=== Religious message ===
As a whole, the statue constitutes a Baroque theatrum sacrum – a theatrical expression of faith performed by the saints depicted on it and a sign of divine Providence watching over the town. The notion that the statue represents the Holy Trinity stems from early German Protestant scholars studying Silesian relics and residents of the former County of Kladsko, who were predominantly Protestant, thus interpreting the statue through that lens. This interpretation and name were adopted in Polish post-war literature. Kalinowski notes that the statue depicts Mary in her coronation, a Catholic theme tied to her Assumption, emphasizing her veneration. Historian Marek Sikorski argues that the statue should be called the Coronation of the Immaculate rather than the Holy Trinity.

== Bibliography ==
- Kalinowski, Konstanty (1987). Rzeźba barokowa na Śląsku [Baroque Sculpture in Silesia] (in Polish). Warsaw: Państwowe Wydawnictwo Naukowe. ISBN 978-83-01-05987-3.
- Gernat, Jacek (2022). Od Klahrów do Thammów – modele funkcjonowania rodzinnych przedsiębiorstw rzeźbiarskich w Kotlinie Kłodzkiej i Śłąsku w XVIII–XX w. [From the Klahrs to the Thamms – Models of Operation of Family Sculpture Enterprises in the Kłodzko Valley and Silesia in the 18th–20th Centuries] (in Polish). Vol. I–II. Poznań: Instytut Historii Sztuki Uniwersytetu im. Adama Mickiewicza w Poznaniu.
