= Zdeněk Otava =

Czech operatic baritone

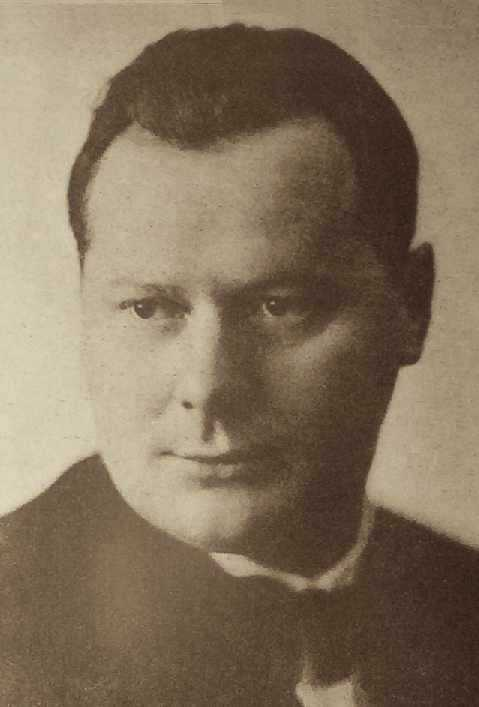
Zdeněk Otava

Zdeněk Otava (11 March 1902 – 4 December 1980) was a Czech operatic baritone. He had a lengthy career at the Prague National Theatre that spanned more than four decades. Musicologist Alena Němcová stated that, "Otava's voice had a very wide vocal range and a marked intensity, and while light, was extremely varied in colour, with an even tone, free of vibrato; his diction was absolutely clear." In addition to his opera career, he was also a successful recitalist, particularly known for his performances of the contemporary Czech repertoire. His voice is preserved on a number of recordings made on the Supraphon label.

== Biography ==
Born in Vítějeves, he worked as a choirboy in Brno where his singing drew the praise of Leoš Janáček. In his youth he studied violin and piano with Bohuslav Martinů. He initially wanted to become a teacher like his father and attended the College of Education in Brno, at which time he pursued further music studies privately with Janáček. After singing lessons with Bohumil Benoni in Prague, he studied opera further in Rome with Riccardo Stracciari and then in Milan and Vienna.

In 1925 he made his professional opera début at the Slovak National Theatre in Bratislava as Iago in Otello. A year later was engaged by the Mahen Theatre in Brno with which he sang Baron Prus in the première of Janáček's The Makropulos Affair and the title role in Ernst Krenek’s Jonny spielt auf.

From 1929 to 1972 Otava worked at the Prague National Theatre, singing more than 160 roles; he also toured widely abroad. With his striking stage presence, he excelled in portrayals of Germont in La traviata, Pizarro in Fidelio, Scarpia in Tosca, Telramund in Lohengrin, and the title heroes in The Marriage of Figaro and Eugene Onegin. He also was highly successful in the Czech repertory, and learnt a large number of contemporary roles. In 1949 he performed in the world premiere of František Škroup's Columbus (composed 1855).

Otava was also a highly respected voice teacher. He taught at the Prague Conservatory in 1941–1942 and again in 1953. He was on the faculty at the Academy of Performing Arts in Prague in 1952–1973. Among his notable pupils were Václav Zítek and Naděžda Kniplová. In 1959 he was made a People's Artist of the USSR. After retiring from the stage in 1972 he lived in retirement in Prague where he died in 1980 at the age of 78.
