= Lądek-Zdrój =

Lądek-Zdrój Landek (English)
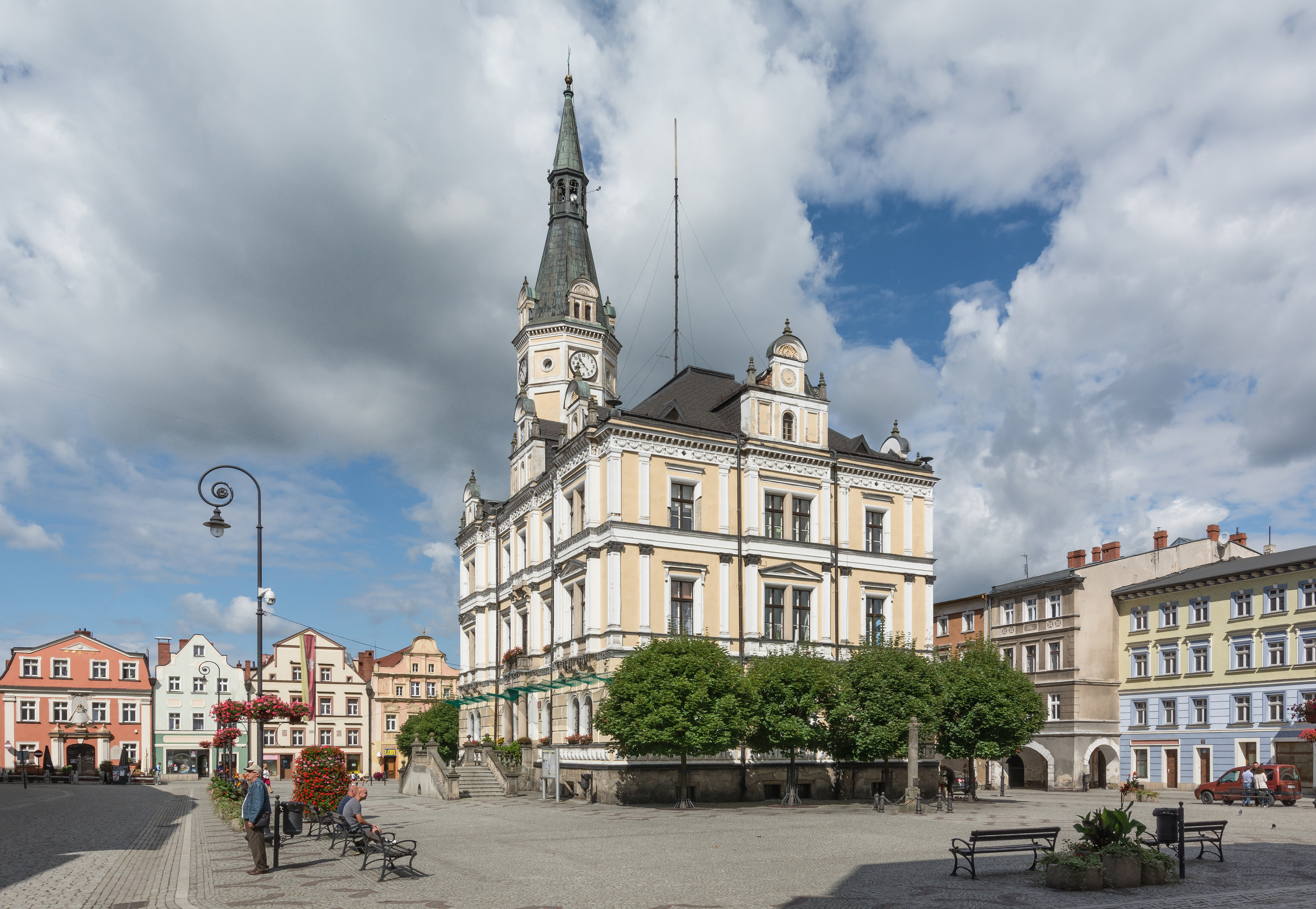
- Town hall and Rynek (Market Square) in Lądek-Zdrój

- Flag Coat of arms

- Location within Poland
- Coordinates: 50°20′37″N 16°52′47″E
- Country: Poland
- Voivodeship: Lower Silesian
- County: Kłodzko
- Gmina: Lądek-Zdrój
- Town rights: 1282

Area
  - Total: 20.32 km^{2} (7.85 sq mi)
- Highest elevation: 480 m (1,570 ft)
- Lowest elevation: 440 m (1,440 ft)

Population (2019-06-30)
  - Total: 5,572
  - Density: 274.2/km^{2} (710.2/sq mi)
- Time zone: UTC+1 (CET)
  - Summer (DST): UTC+2 (CEST)
- Vehicle registration: DKL
- Website: www.ladek.pl

Lądek-Zdrój [ˈlɔndɛɡ ˈzdruj] (Czech: Landek; German: Bad Landeck), known in English as Landek, is a spa town situated in Kłodzko County, Lower Silesian Voivodeship, southwestern Poland. It is the seat of the administrative district (gmina) called Gmina Lądek-Zdrój, close to the Czech border. As of 2019, the town has a population of 5,572.

== Geography ==
It lies in the Sudetes in two mountain ranges - the Golden Mountains and the Śnieżnik Massif.

== History ==
According to historical records, the therapeutic properties of the local mineral waters were already enjoyed in 1241, thus Lądek is considered the oldest spa town in Poland. Located within the historic Kłodzko Land, it was granted town rights in 1282 by Duke of Wrocław and future High Duke of Poland Henryk IV Probus of the Piast dynasty.

In 1949–1950 Greeks and Macedonians, refugees of the Greek Civil War, were temporarily admitted in Lądek-Zdrój, before new homes were found for them in other towns (see also: Greece–Poland relations).

The town was badly affected by the 2024 Central European floods.

== Culture ==
Lądek-Zdrój is a picturesque spa town with rich historical architecture ranging from Gothic to Renaissance and Baroque, numerous sanatoriums, parks and gardens, including an arboretum, considered one of the oldest spa towns in Poland.

Lądek-Zdrój became famous in Poland because of Stanisław Bareja's cult film Teddy Bear (Miś).

Each year, the town is host to the Andrzej Zawada mountain film festival.

== Gallery ==
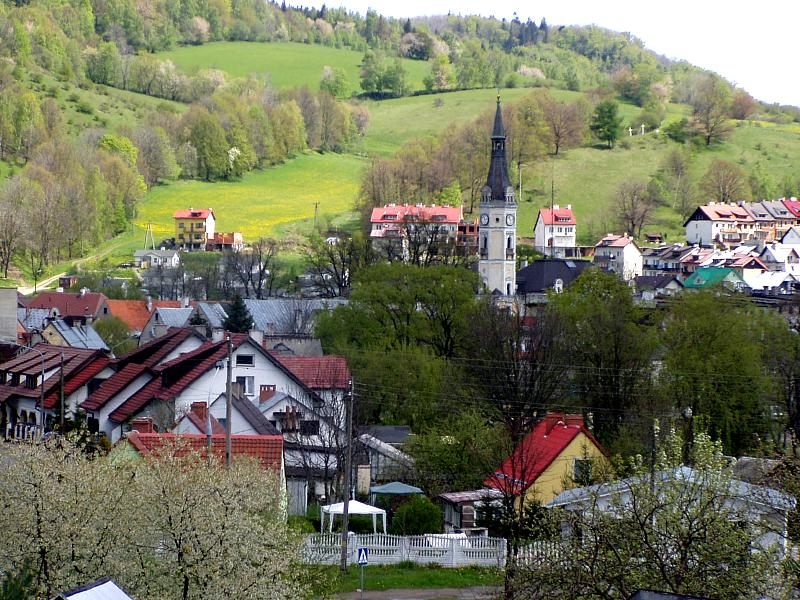
Lądek-Zdrój in spring

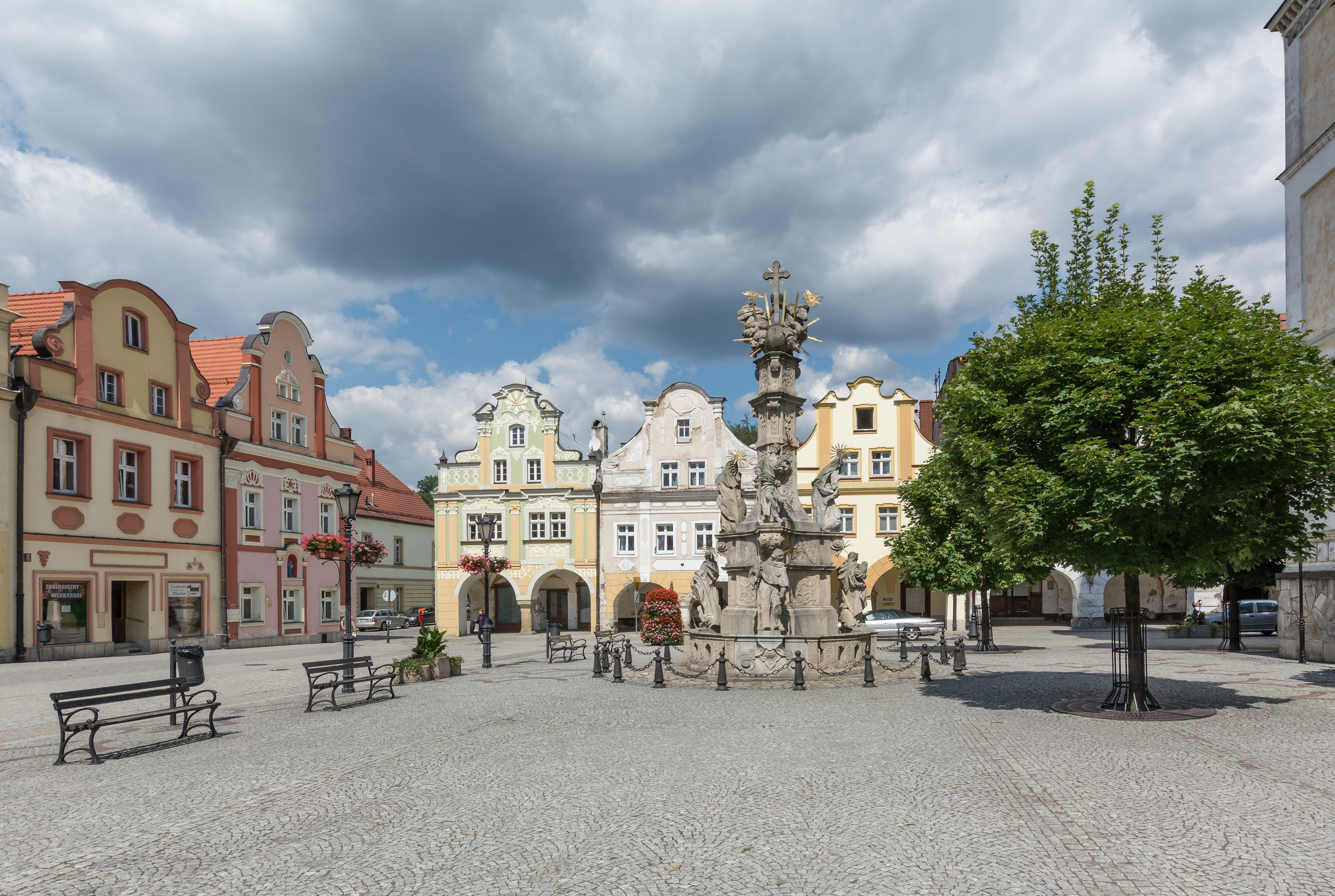
Northwestern corner of the Market Square (Rynek) with the Baroque Holy Trinity statue

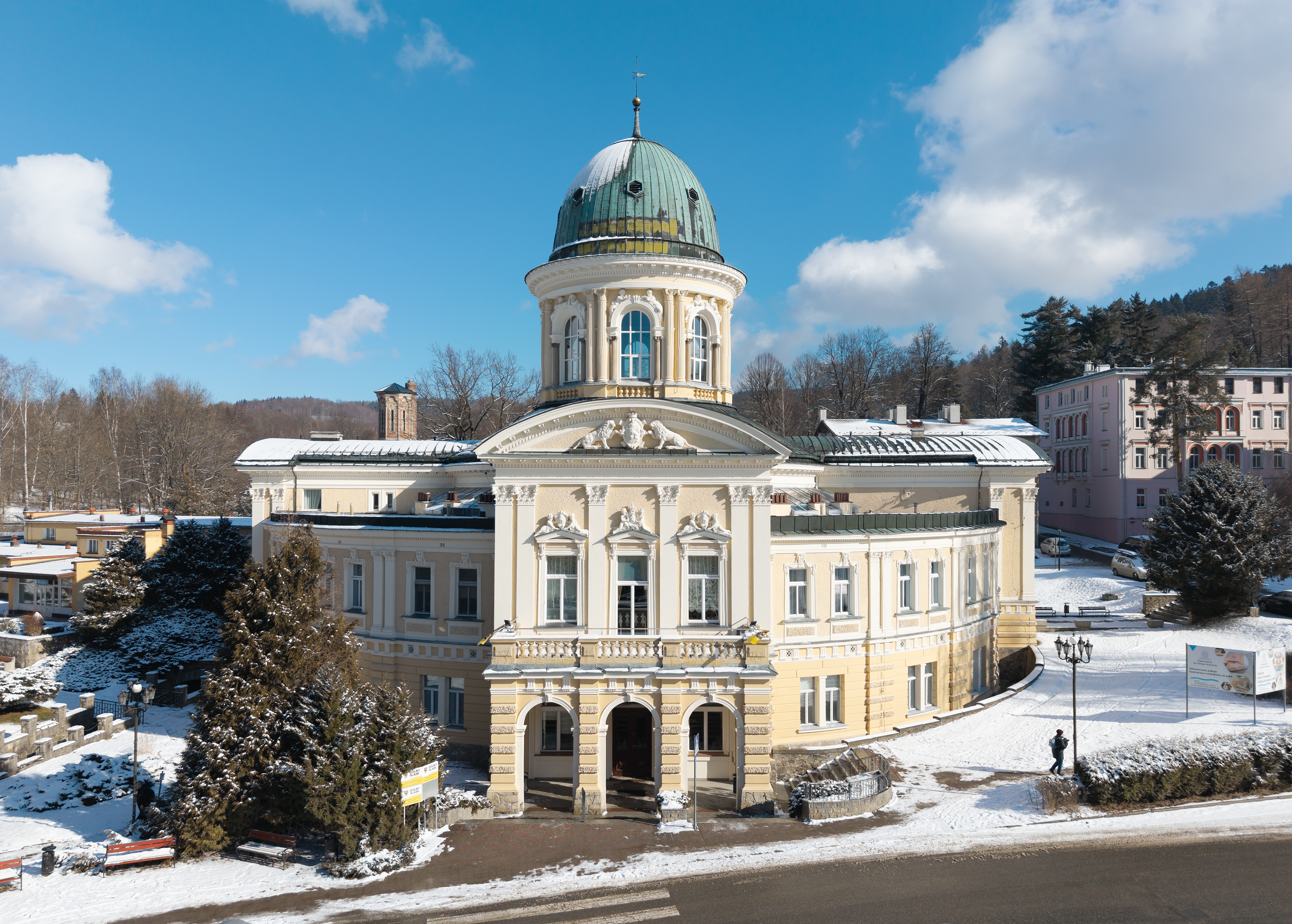
Spa house "Wojciech"

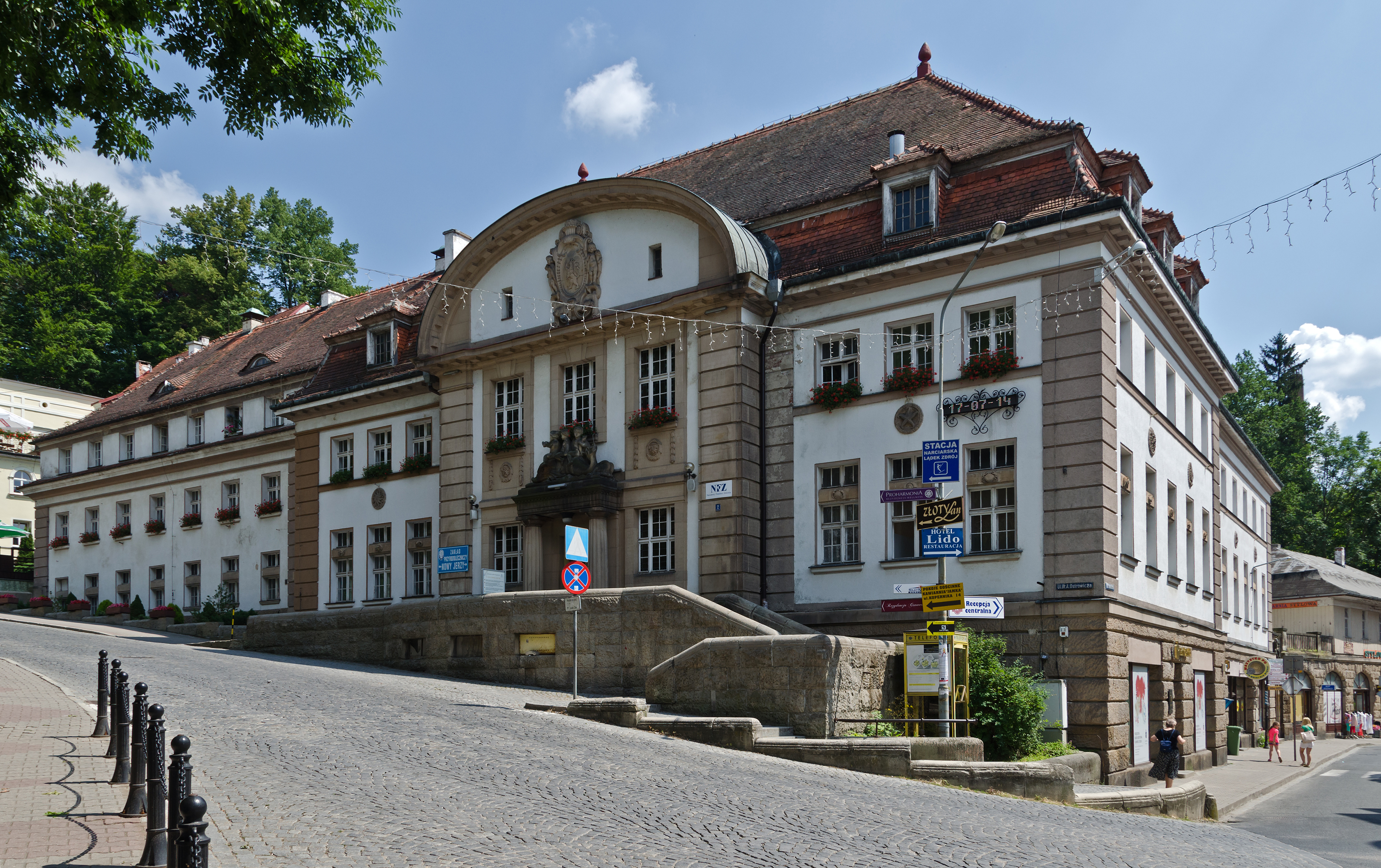
Sanatorium "Nowy Jerzy"

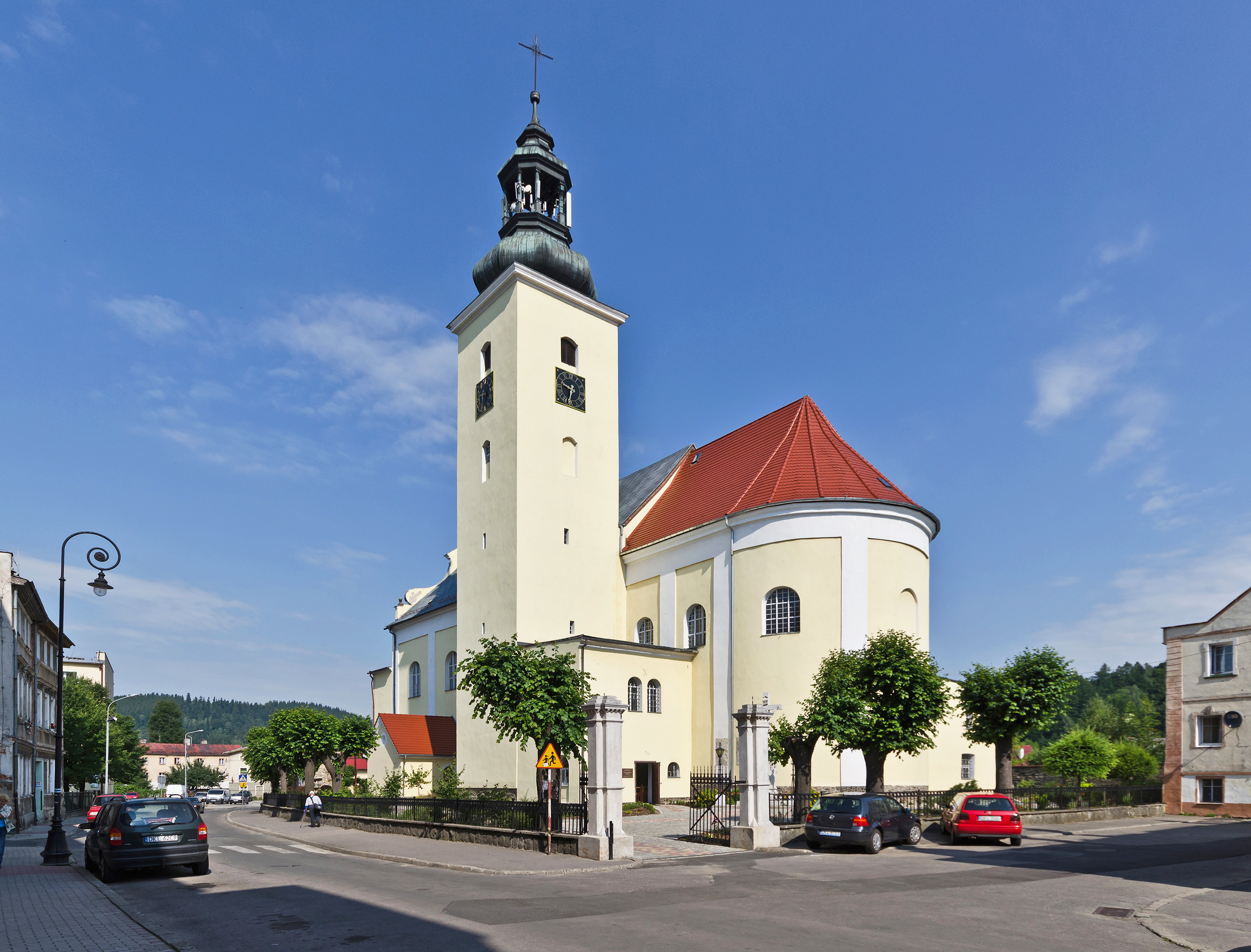
Baroque Church of the Nativity of Virgin Mary

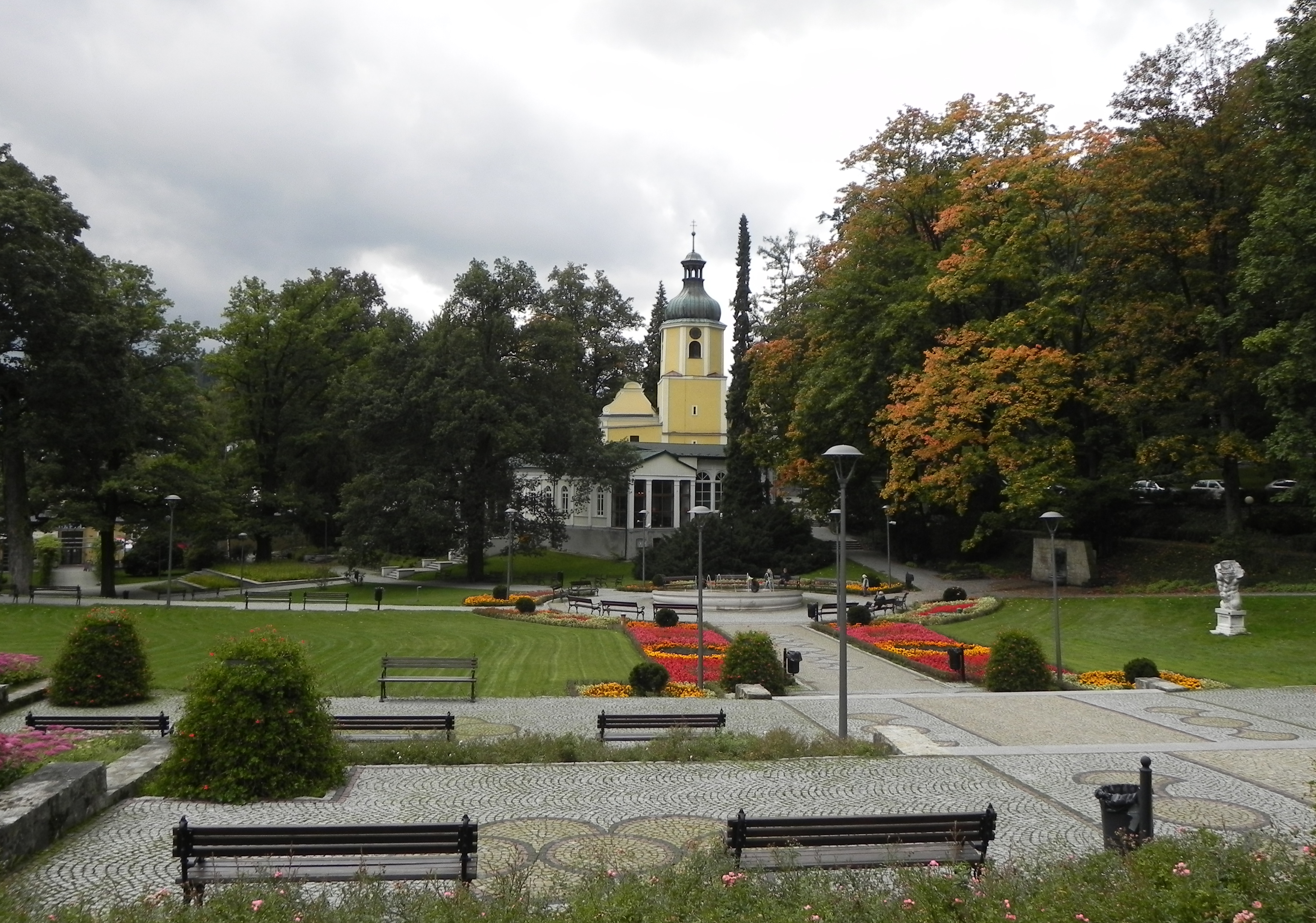
Spa gardens with the Saint Mary chapel

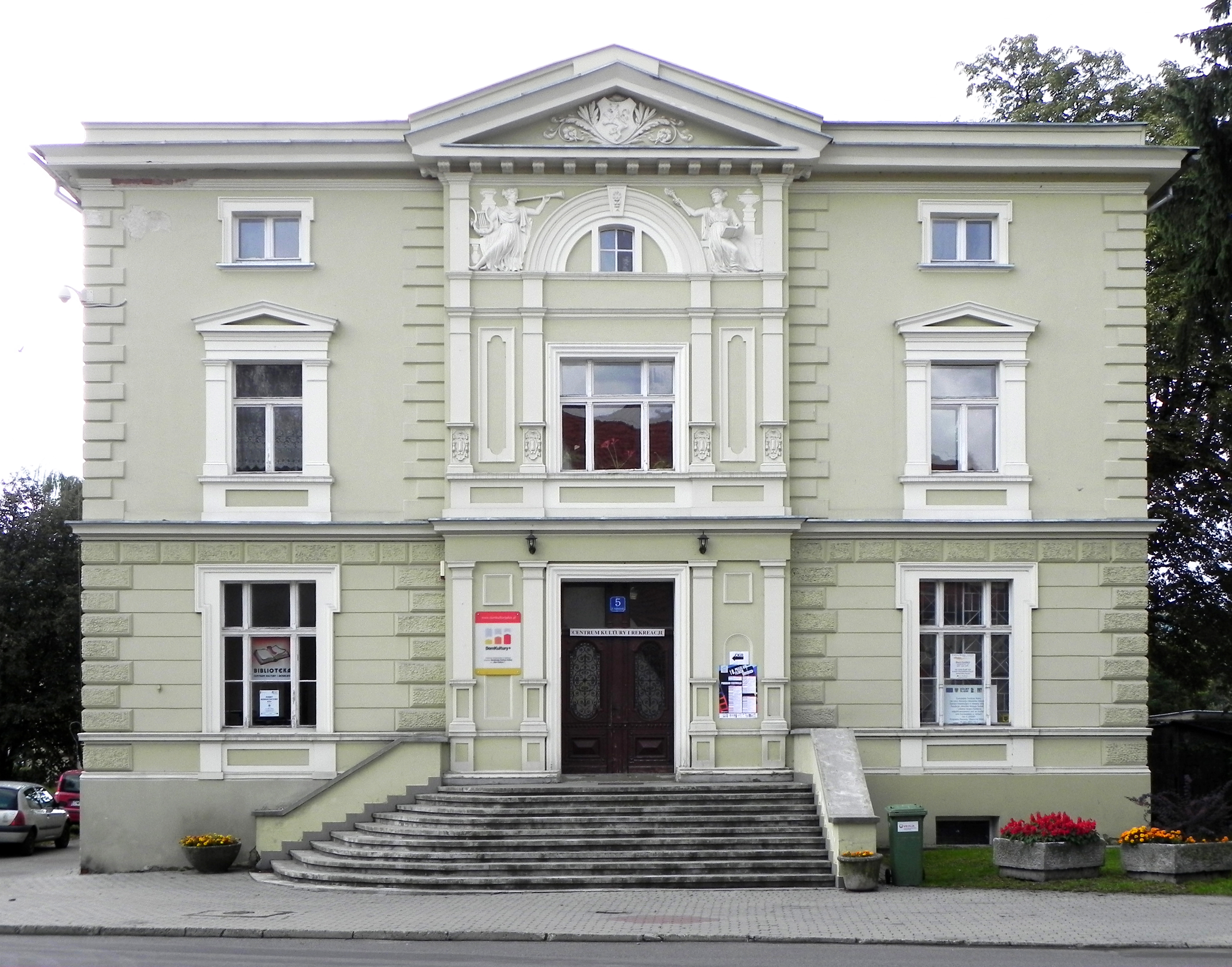
Centre of Culture and Recreation

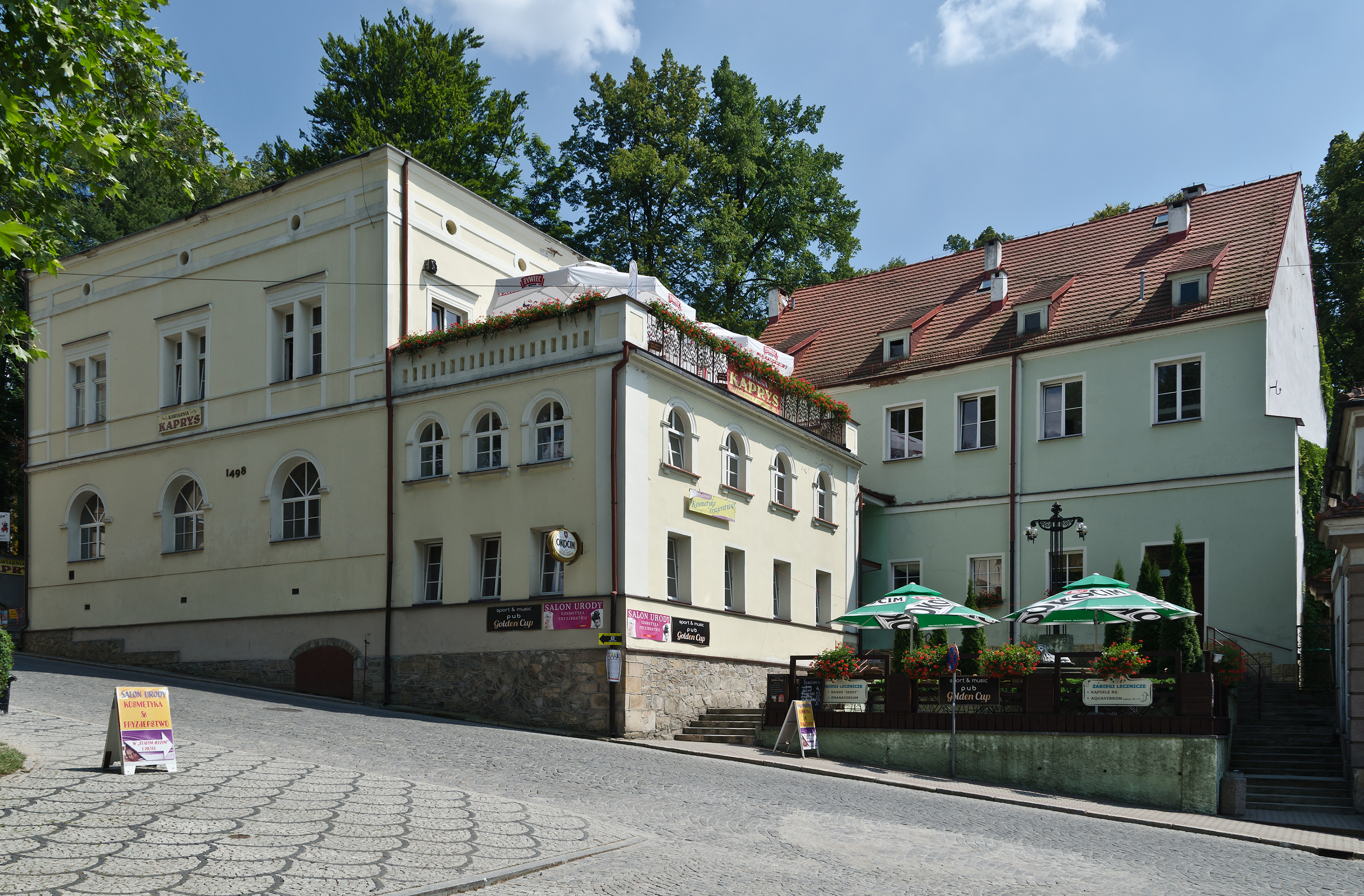
Sanatorium "Stary Jerzy"

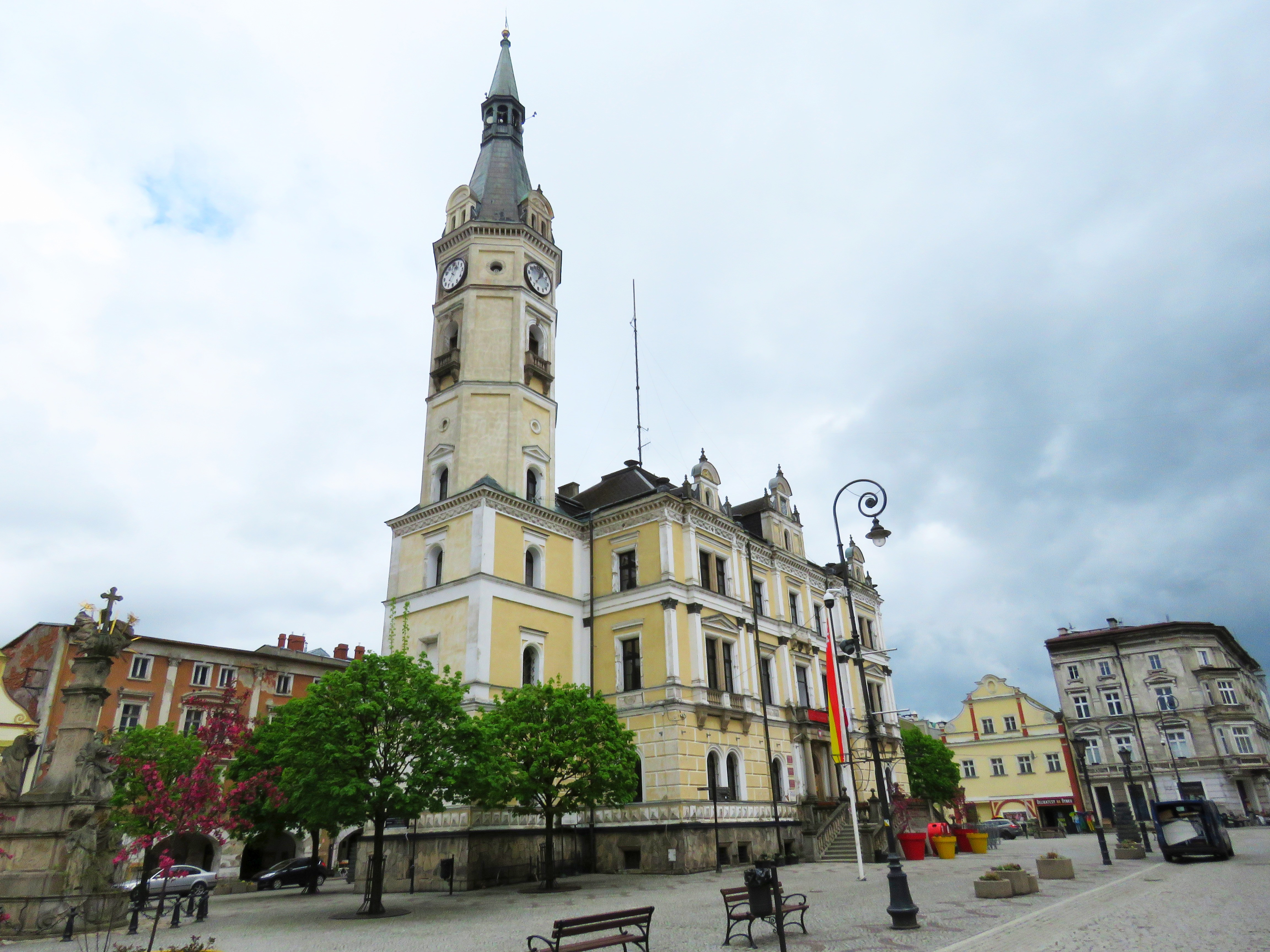
Town hall in the Market Square

== Twin towns – sister cities ==
See twin towns of Gmina Lądek-Zdrój.
