= Vítějeves =

- Municipality
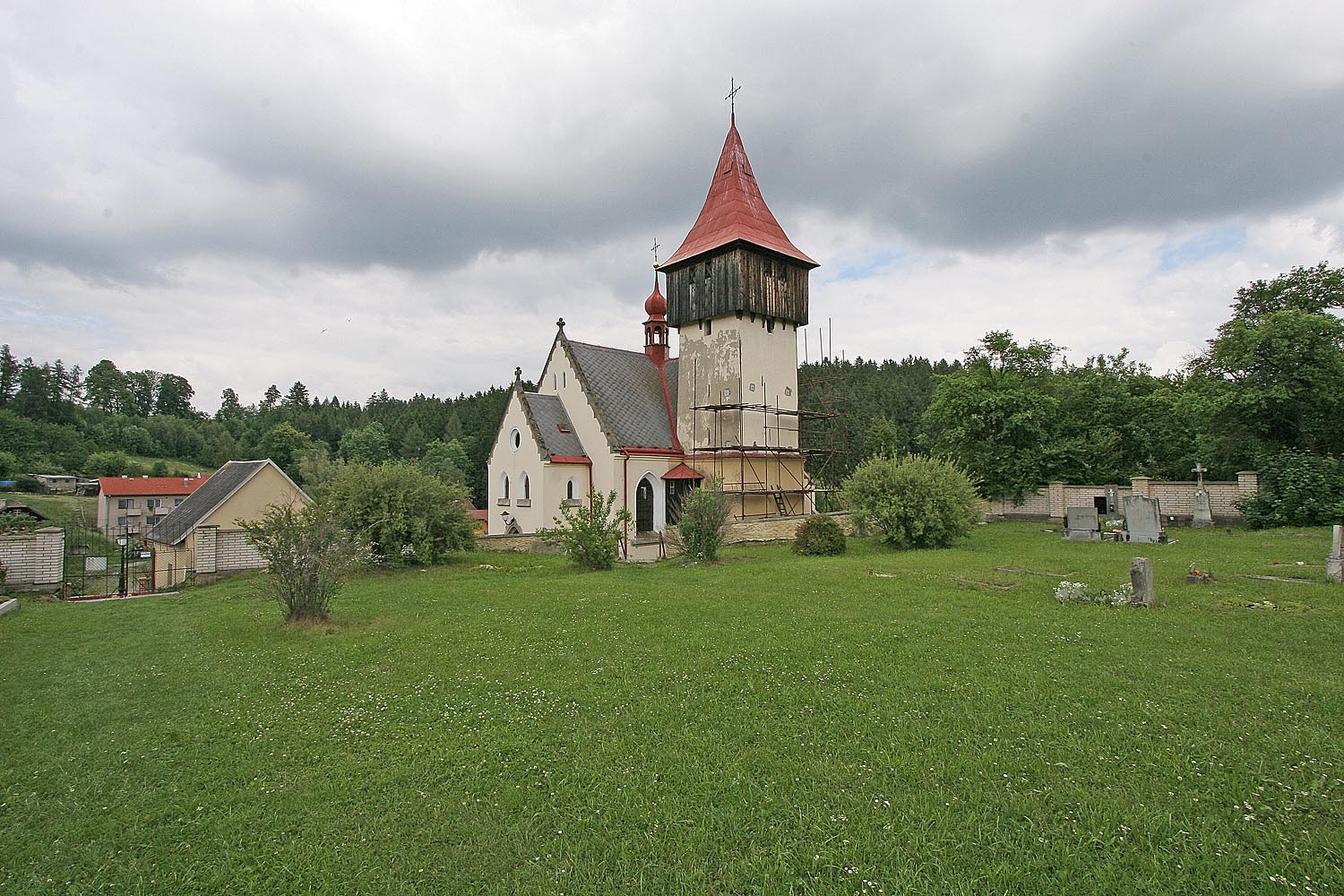
- Church of Saint Catherine

- Flag Coat of arms

- Location in the Czech Republic
- Coordinates: 49°36′57″N 16°27′55″E
- Country: Czech Republic
- Region: Pardubice
- District: Svitavy
- First mentioned: 1437

Area
  - Total: 8.60 km^{2} (3.32 sq mi)
- Elevation: 473 m (1,552 ft)

Population (2026-01-01)
  - Total: 430
  - Density: 50/km^{2} (130/sq mi)
- Time zone: UTC+1 (CET)
  - Summer (DST): UTC+2 (CEST)
- Postal code: 569 06
- Website: www.vitejeves.eu

Vítějeves is a municipality and village in Svitavy District in the Pardubice Region of the Czech Republic. It has about 400 inhabitants.

Vítějeves lies approximately 16 kilometres (10 mi) south of Svitavy, 56 km (35 mi) north of Brno, and 156 km (97 mi) east of Prague.

== Demographics ==
Historical population
Year	Pop.	±%
1869	808	—
1880	832	+3.0%
1890	891	+7.1%
1900	978	+9.8%
1910	1,003	+2.6%
1921	896	−10.7%
1930	833	−7.0%
1950	602	−27.7%
1961	591	−1.8%
1970	572	−3.2%
1980	525	−8.2%
1991	435	−17.1%
2001	401	−7.8%
2011	419	+4.5%
2021	394	−6.0%
Source: Censuses

== Notable people ==
- Zdeněk Otava (1902–1980), opera singer
