= Dlouhá Ves (Havlíčkův Brod District) =

- Municipality
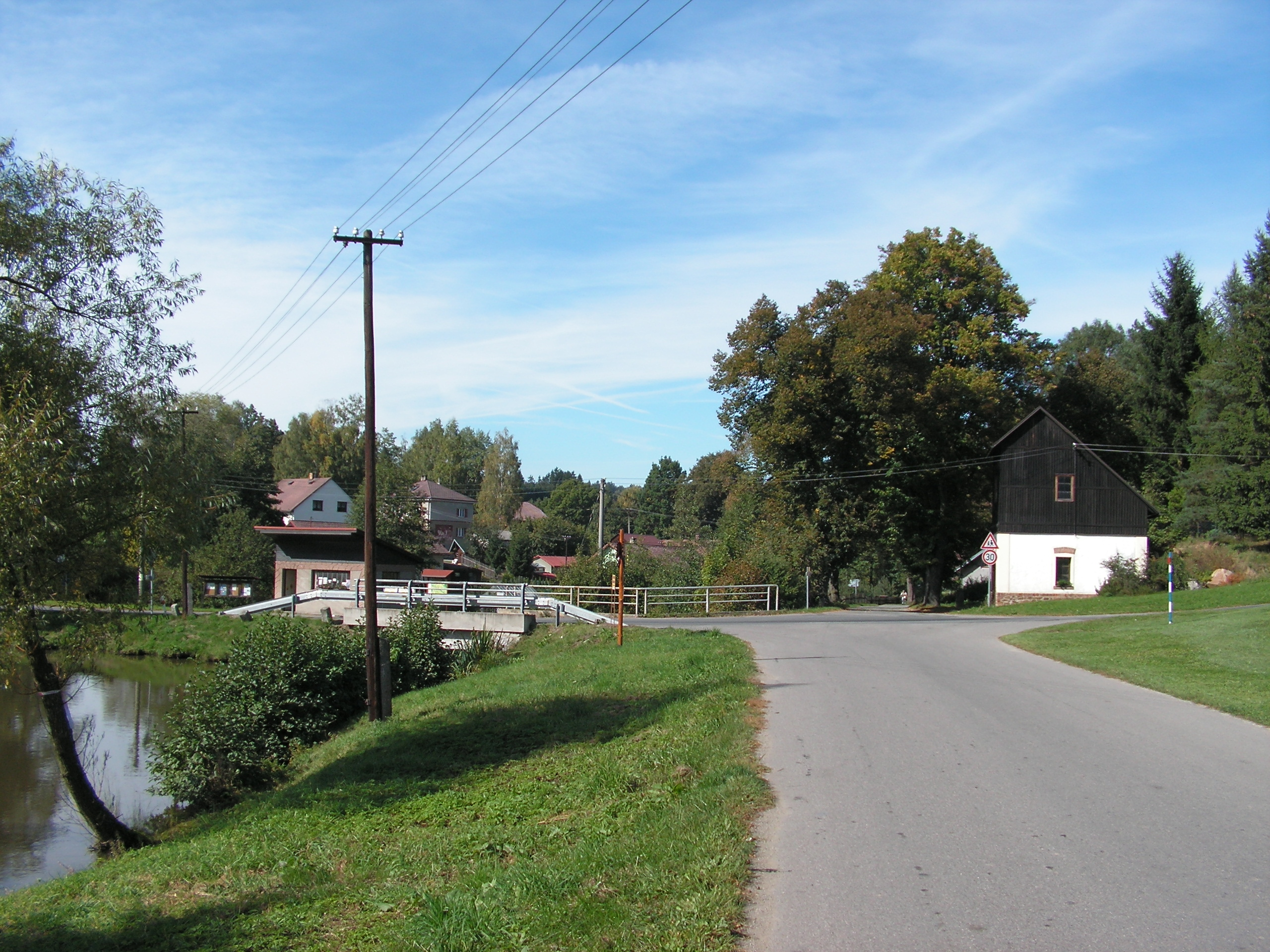
- Centre of Dlouhá Ves

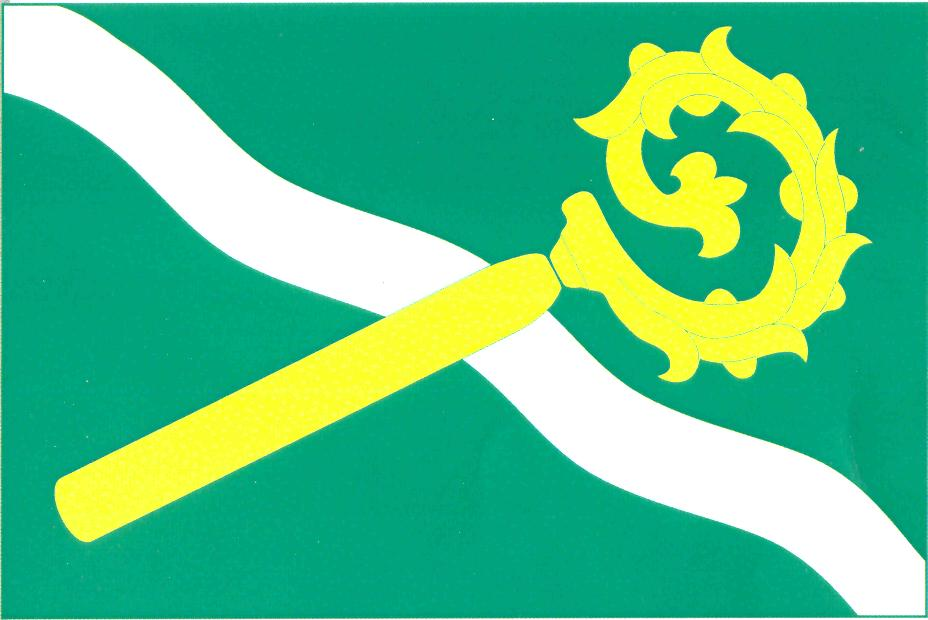
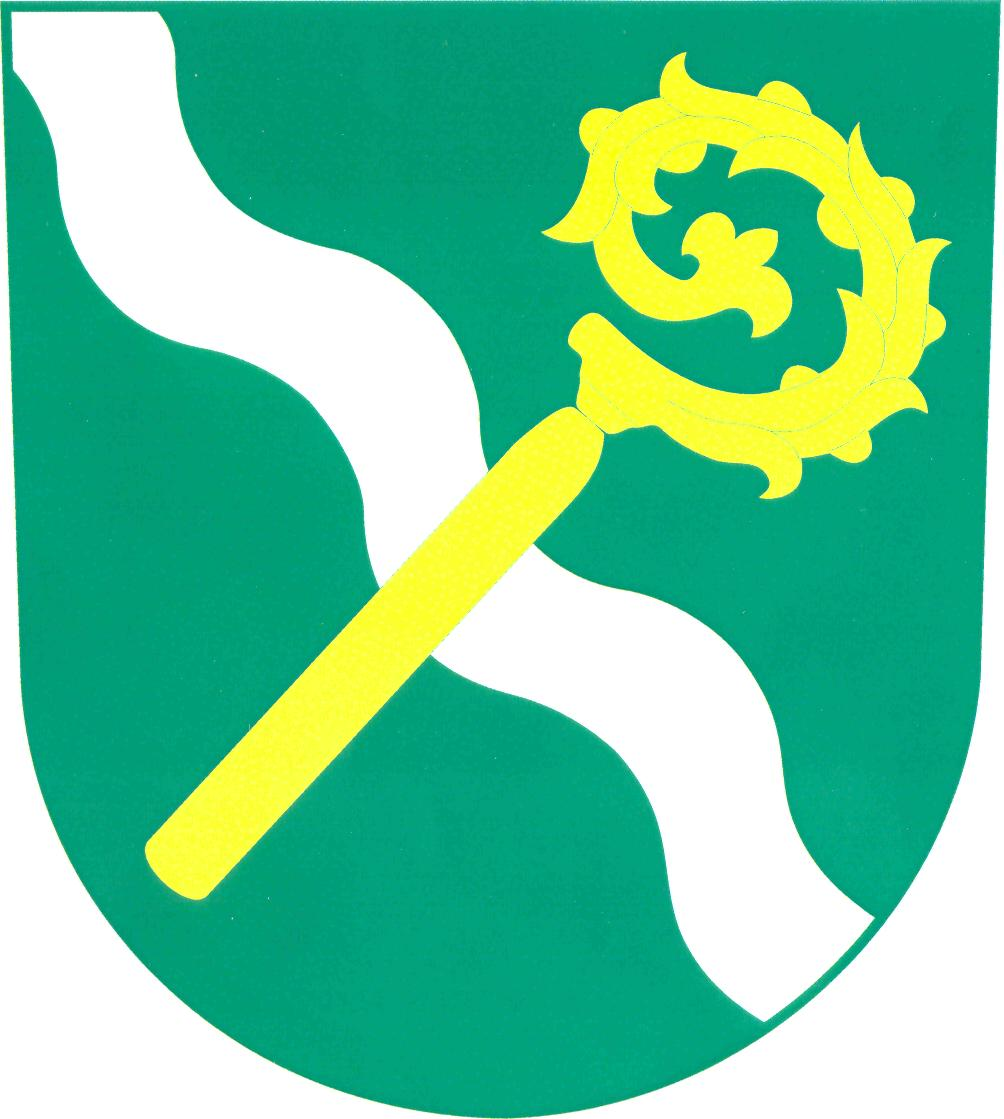
- Flag Coat of arms

- Location in the Czech Republic
- Coordinates: 49°34′43″N 15°40′29″E
- Country: Czech Republic
- Region: Vysočina
- District: Havlíčkův Brod
- First mentioned: 1256

Area
  - Total: 10.81 km^{2} (4.17 sq mi)
- Elevation: 465 m (1,526 ft)

Population (2026-01-01)
  - Total: 435
  - Density: 40.2/km^{2} (104/sq mi)
- Time zone: UTC+1 (CET)
  - Summer (DST): UTC+2 (CEST)
- Postal code: 582 22
- Website: www.dlouhaves.cz

Dlouhá Ves (Czech pronunciation: [ˈdlouɦaː ˈvɛs]) is a municipality and village in Havlíčkův Brod District in the Vysočina Region of the Czech Republic. It has about 400 inhabitants.

Dlouhá Ves lies approximately 9 kilometres (6 mi) south-east of Havlíčkův Brod, 21 km (13 mi) north of Jihlava, and 108 km (67 mi) south-east of Prague.

== Demographics ==
Historical population
| Year | Pop. | ±% |
|---|---|---|
| 1869 | 451 | — |
| 1880 | 428 | −5.1% |
| 1890 | 454 | +6.1% |
| 1900 | 450 | −0.9% |
| 1910 | 486 | +8.0% |
| 1921 | 513 | +5.6% |
| 1930 | 500 | −2.5% |
| 1950 | 409 | −18.2% |
| 1961 | 424 | +3.7% |
| 1970 | 400 | −5.7% |
| 1980 | 374 | −6.5% |
| 1991 | 325 | −13.1% |
| 2001 | 342 | +5.2% |
| 2011 | 393 | +14.9% |
| 2021 | 425 | +8.1% |
Source: Censuses
