= Truskovice =

- Municipality
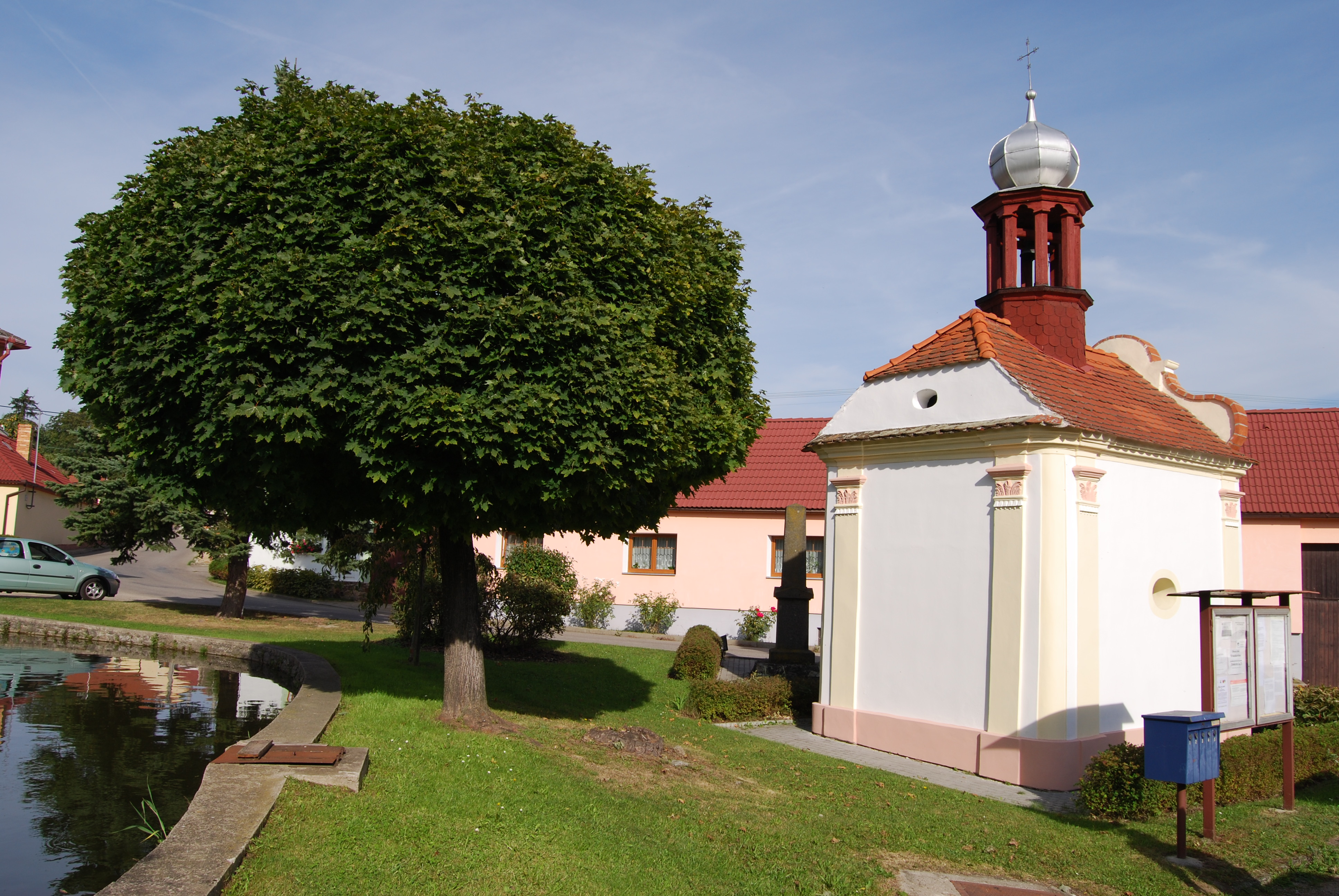
- Chapel in the centre of Truskovice

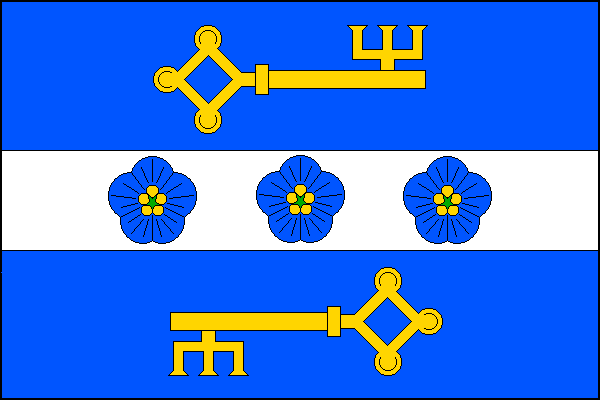
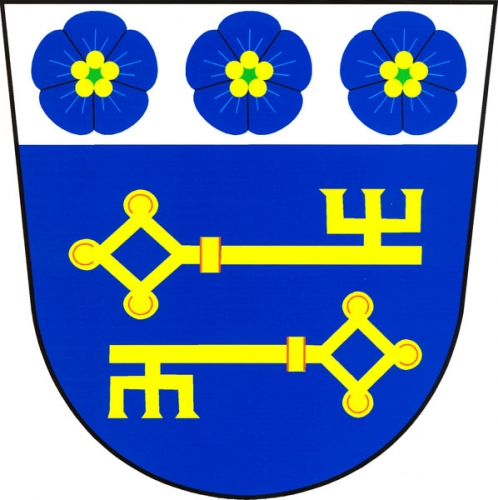
- Flag Coat of arms

- Location in the Czech Republic
- Coordinates: 49°6′15″N 14°9′40″E
- Country: Czech Republic
- Region: South Bohemian
- District: Strakonice
- First mentioned: 1274

Area
  - Total: 6.22 km^{2} (2.40 sq mi)
- Elevation: 498 m (1,634 ft)

Population (2026-01-01)
  - Total: 211
  - Density: 33.9/km^{2} (87.9/sq mi)
- Time zone: UTC+1 (CET)
  - Summer (DST): UTC+2 (CEST)
- Postal code: 389 01
- Website: www.truskovice.cz

Truskovice is a municipality and village in Strakonice District in the South Bohemian Region of the Czech Republic. It has about 200 inhabitants.

Truskovice lies approximately 26 kilometres (16 mi) south-east of Strakonice, 28 km (17 mi) north-west of České Budějovice, and 111 km (69 mi) south of Prague.

== Administrative division ==
Truskovice consists of two municipal parts (in brackets population according to the 2021 census):

- Truskovice (185)
- Dlouhá Ves (15)

== Demographics ==
Historical population
Year	Pop.	±%
1869	627	—
1880	567	−9.6%
1890	513	−9.5%
1900	481	−6.2%
1910	431	−10.4%
1921	429	−0.5%
1930	393	−8.4%
1950	283	−28.0%
1961	280	−1.1%
1970	221	−21.1%
1980	187	−15.4%
1991	203	+8.6%
2001	174	−14.3%
2011	171	−1.7%
2021	200	+17.0%
Source: Censuses
