= Vrážné =

- Municipality
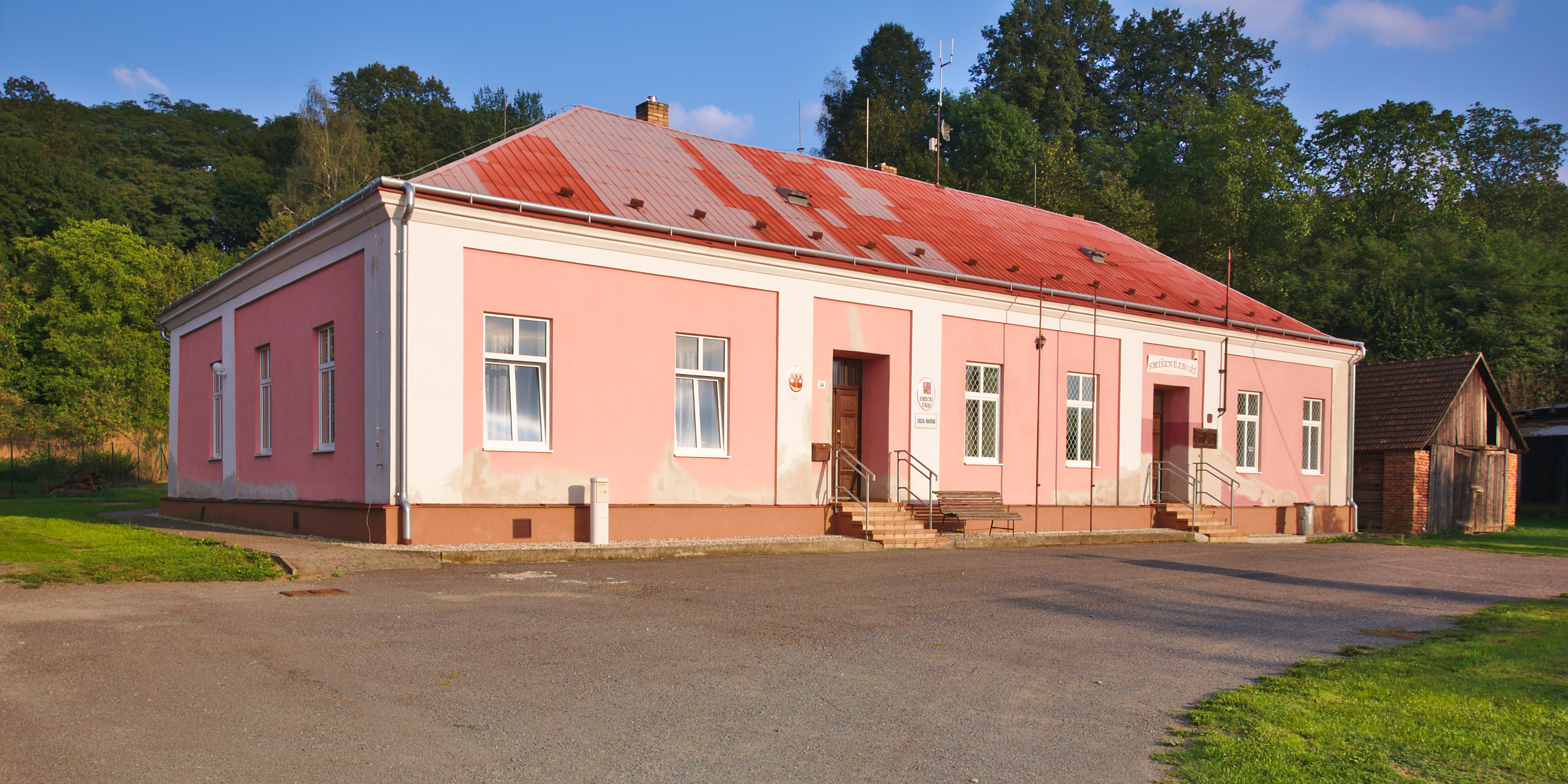
- Municipal office

- Flag Coat of arms

- Location in the Czech Republic
- Coordinates: 49°40′33″N 16°46′41″E
- Country: Czech Republic
- Region: Pardubice
- District: Svitavy
- First mentioned: 1258

Area
  - Total: 4.14 km^{2} (1.60 sq mi)
- Elevation: 350 m (1,150 ft)

Population (2026-01-01)
  - Total: 64
  - Density: 15/km^{2} (40/sq mi)
- Time zone: UTC+1 (CET)
  - Summer (DST): UTC+2 (CEST)
- Postal code: 569 43
- Website: www.vrazneujevicka.cz

Vrážné (German: Brohsen) is a municipality and village in Svitavy District in the Pardubice Region of the Czech Republic. It has about 60 inhabitants.

Vrážné lies approximately 25 kilometres (16 mi) east of Svitavy, 83 km (52 mi) south-east of Pardubice, and 176 km (109 mi) east of Prague.

== Demographics ==
Historical population
Year	Pop.	±%
1869	190	—
1880	183	−3.7%
1890	189	+3.3%
1900	187	−1.1%
1910	185	−1.1%
1921	209	+13.0%
1930	182	−12.9%
1950	154	−15.4%
1961	160	+3.9%
1970	144	−10.0%
1980	100	−30.6%
1991	80	−20.0%
2001	67	−16.2%
2011	72	+7.5%
2021	64	−11.1%
Source: Censuses
