= Pohledy =

- Municipality
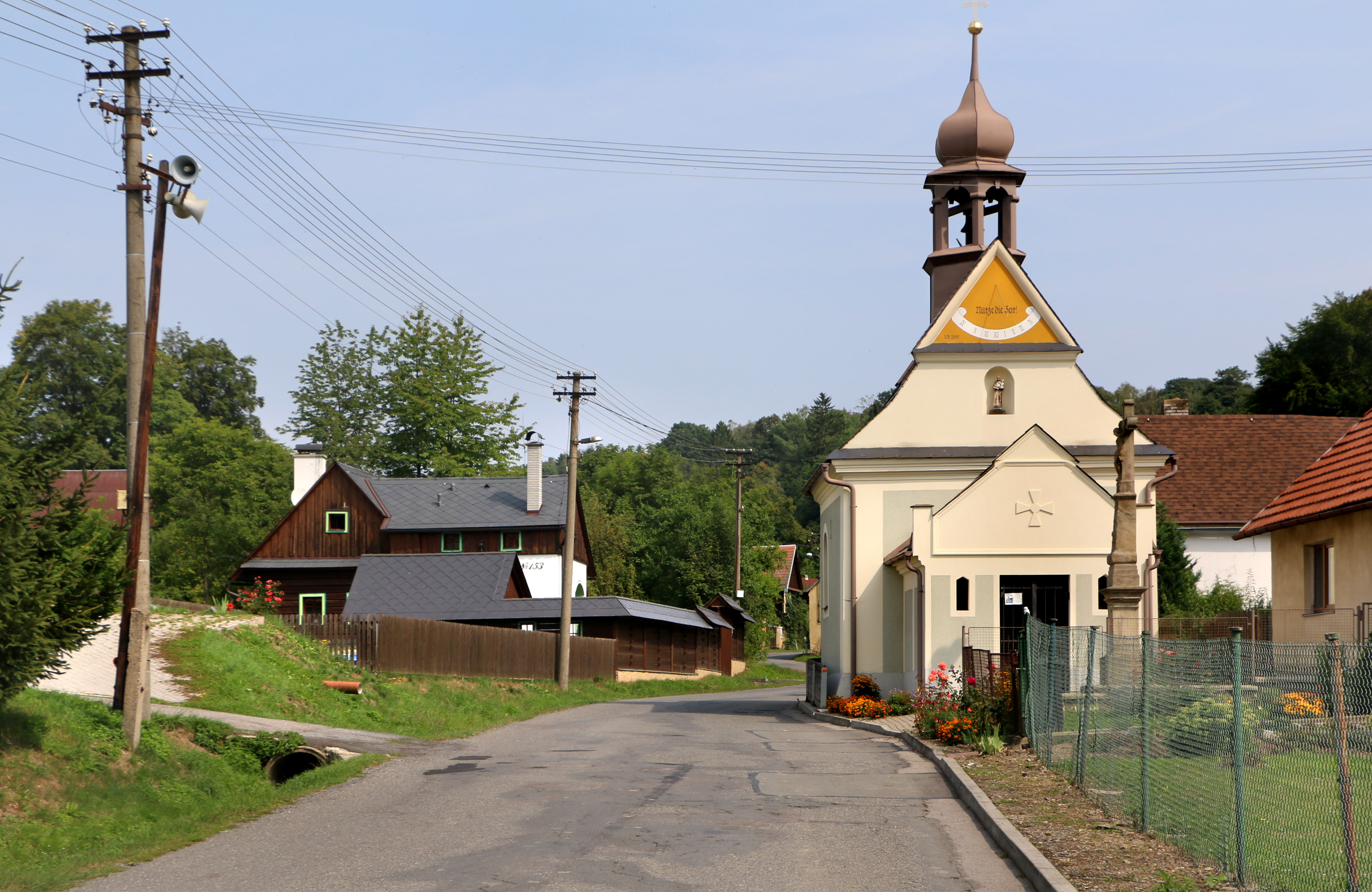
- Centre of Pohledy with the Chapel of Saint Vitus

- Flag Coat of arms

- Location in the Czech Republic
- Coordinates: 49°41′42″N 16°33′38″E
- Country: Czech Republic
- Region: Pardubice
- District: Svitavy
- First mentioned: 1365

Area
  - Total: 19.91 km^{2} (7.69 sq mi)
- Elevation: 495 m (1,624 ft)

Population (2026-01-01)
  - Total: 315
  - Density: 15.8/km^{2} (41.0/sq mi)
- Time zone: UTC+1 (CET)
  - Summer (DST): UTC+2 (CEST)
- Postal code: 568 02
- Website: www.obec-pohledy.cz

Pohledy is a municipality and village in Svitavy District in the Pardubice Region of the Czech Republic. It has about 300 inhabitants.

Pohledy lies approximately 10 kilometres (6 mi) south-east of Svitavy, 69 km (43 mi) south-east of Pardubice, and 160 km (99 mi) east of Prague.

== Administrative division ==
Pohledy consists of two municipal parts (in brackets population according to the 2021 census):

- Pohledy (89)
- Horní Hynčina (204)

== Demographics ==
Historical population
Year	Pop.	±%
1869	1,551	—
1880	1,688	+8.8%
1890	1,670	−1.1%
1900	1,711	+2.5%
1910	1,652	−3.4%
1921	1,449	−12.3%
1930	1,455	+0.4%
1950	656	−54.9%
1961	588	−10.4%
1970	538	−8.5%
1980	426	−20.8%
1991	350	−17.8%
2001	334	−4.6%
2011	297	−11.1%
2021	293	−1.3%
Source: Censuses
