= Hynčice (Vražné) =

- municipal part of the Czech Republic, cadastral area in the Czech Republic
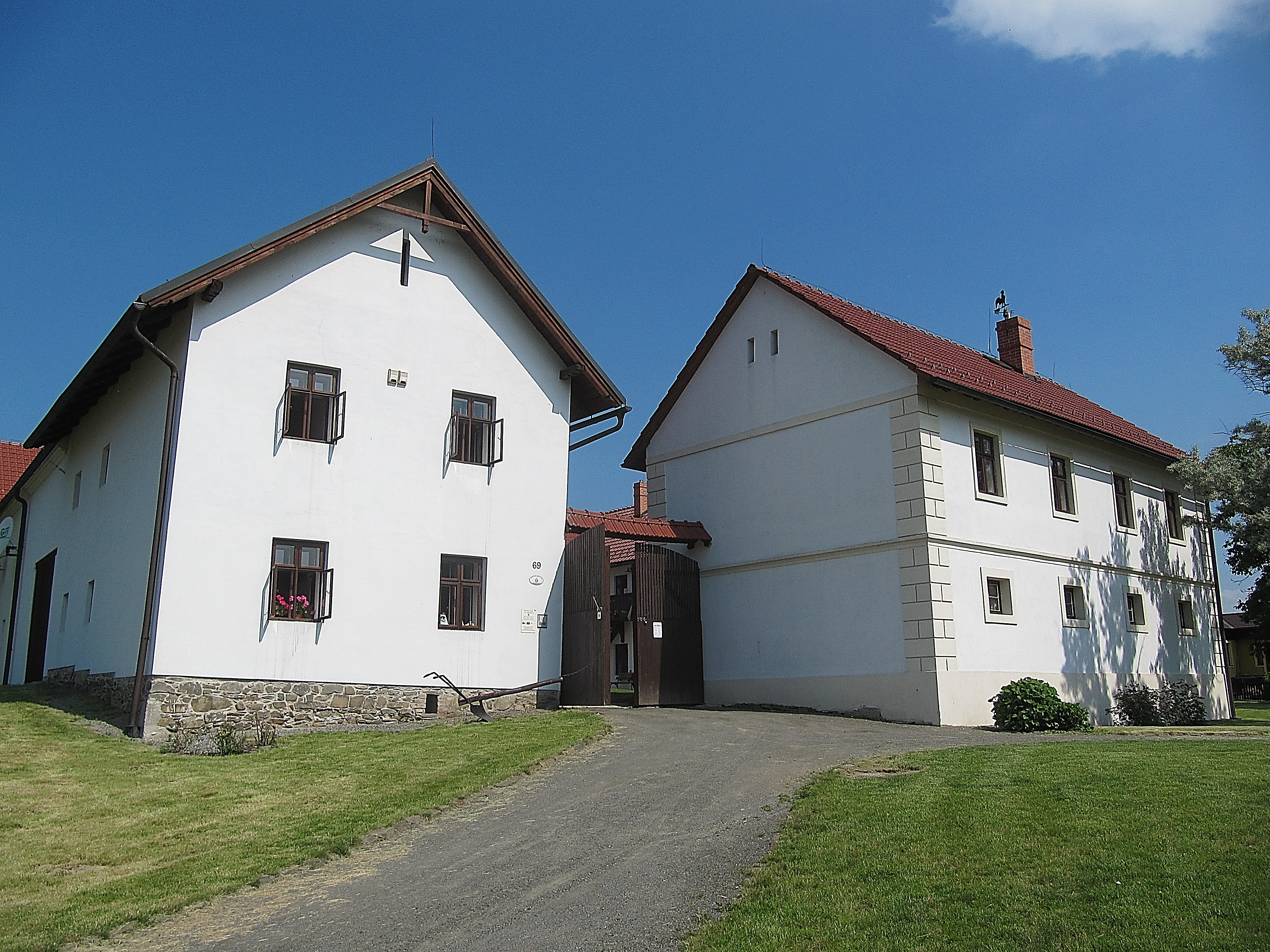
- Casa de naixement de Gregor Mendel
- Interactive map of Hynčice
- Coordinates: 49°37′08″N 17°50′07″E
- Country: Czech Republic

Population (26 March 2021)
  - Total: 197
- Postal code: 742 34

Hynčice (Czech pronunciation: [ˈɦɪntʃɪtsɛ], German: Heinzendorf bei Odrau) is a Silesian village, administratively part of Vražné municipality, located about 13 km west of Nový Jičín in Moravian-Silesian Region, today part of the Czech Republic. As of the 2021 census, the village reported a population of 197, marking a 15% decline from the 2001 census figure of 232. The name of the village is thought to derive from the given name Hynek (Heinz, in German). This village is well known for being the birthplace of geneticist Gregor Mendel.

== History ==
Hynčice was founded along the stream Vraženka (formerly known as Wrasni or Rossbach), which originates near the village of Veselí in Odry. The village's elevation is 300 metres (980 ft) above sea level. In the early 16th century, the village was abandoned. It was recolonised later that century. During this time, the village went from being primarily populated by Czechs to being primarily populated by Germans.

Between 1780 and 1788, the first (unofficial) private school was run in Hynčice by Anton Schwirtlich, who was Gregor Mendel's granduncle. Following Schwirtlich's marriage, the school was closed, but a permanent elementary school was constructed in 1796.

By the early 1800s, Hynčice controlled 383 hectares (950 acres) of fields and 89 hectares (220 acres) of meadows. 41 horses and 98 cattle were accounted for in the village. The primary crops grown in the village were rye, wheat, barley, oats, garden peas, and lentils, with potatoes, beets, alfalfa, and clover being newly introduced for crop rotation.

Gregor Mendel was born in Hynčice in 1822 and lived in Farmstead No. 58 for much of his early life. In 1855, the Chapel of the Virgin Mary was built in Hynčice.
