= Vražné =

- Municipality
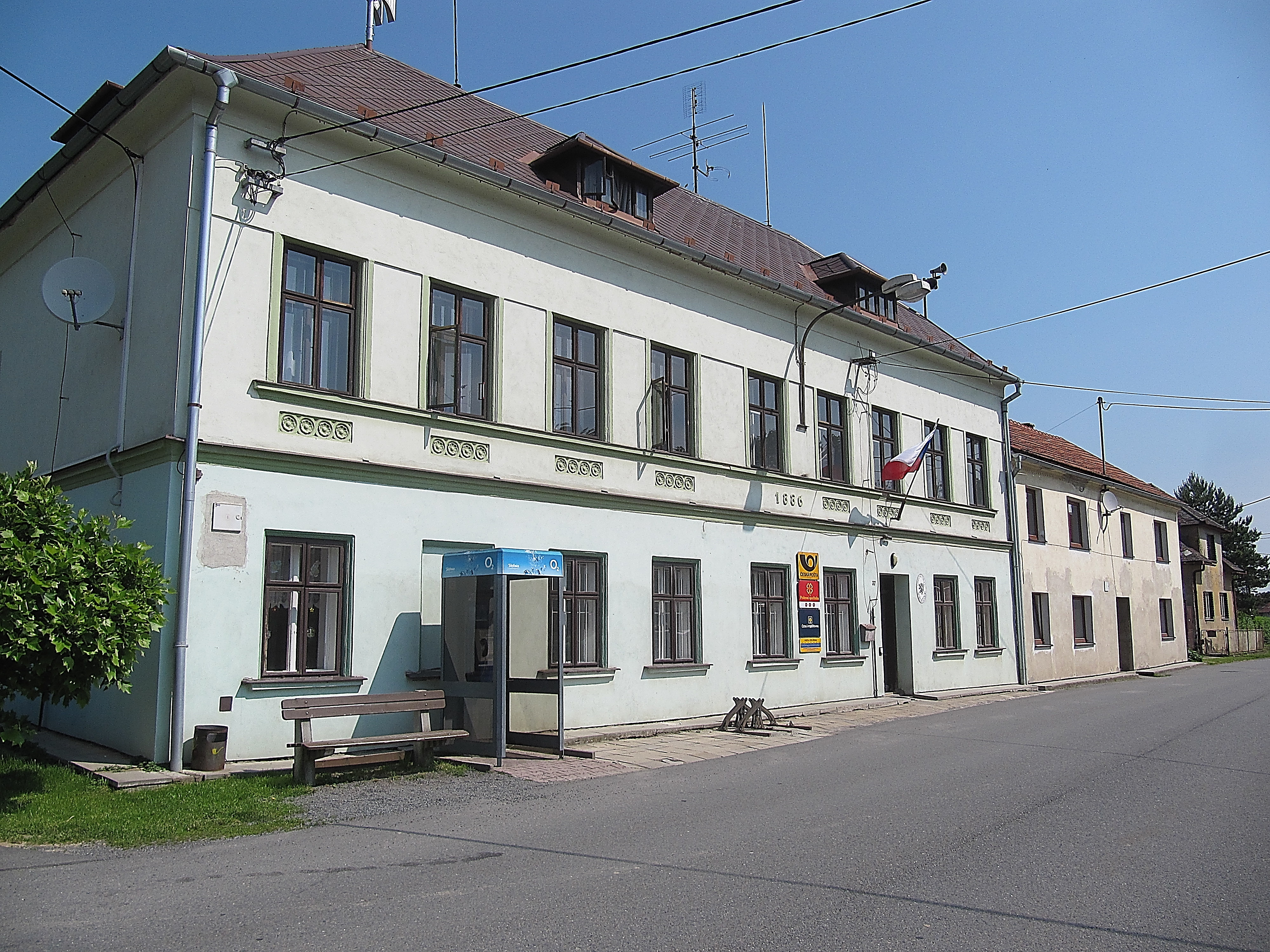
- Municipal office

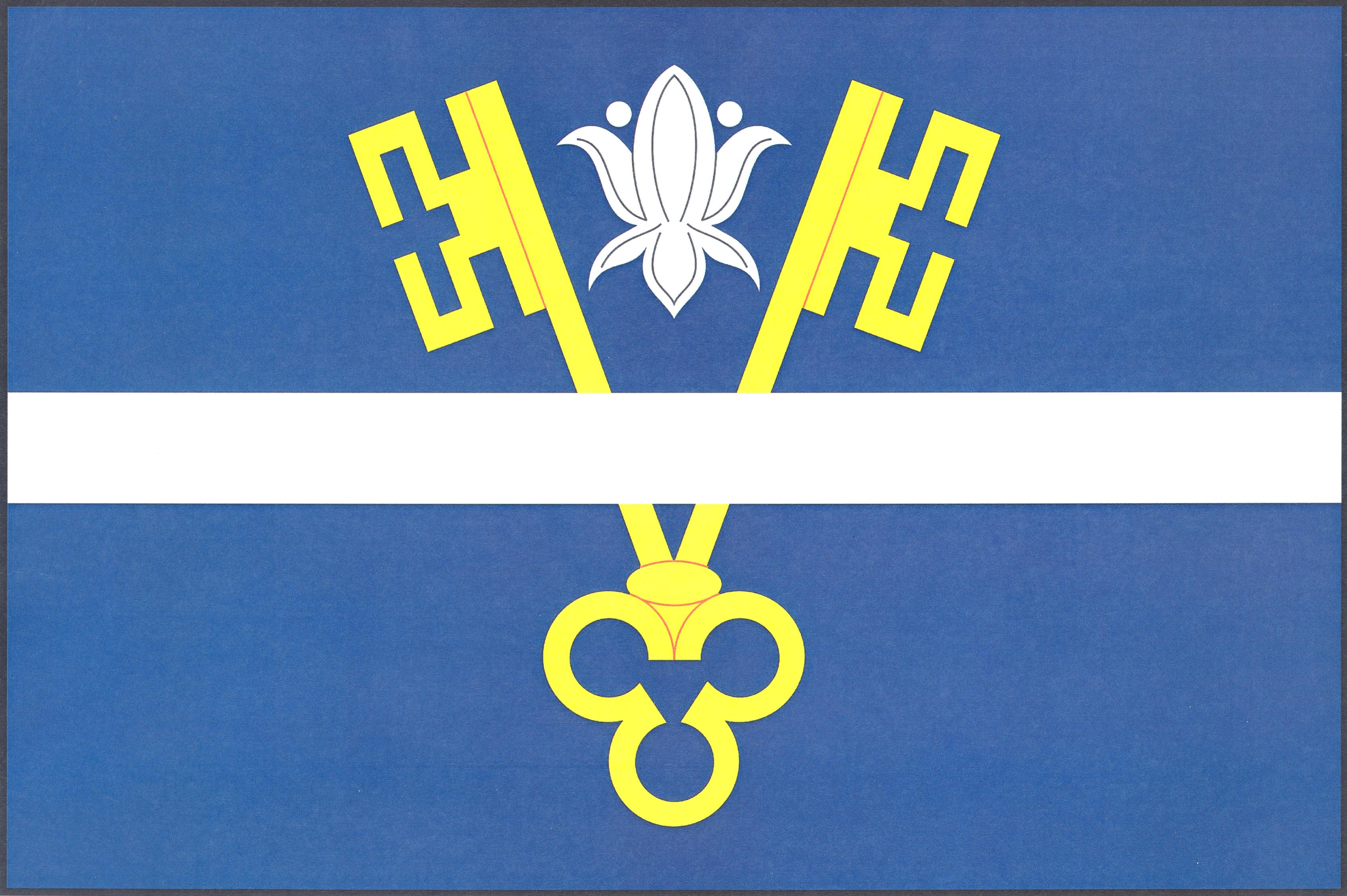
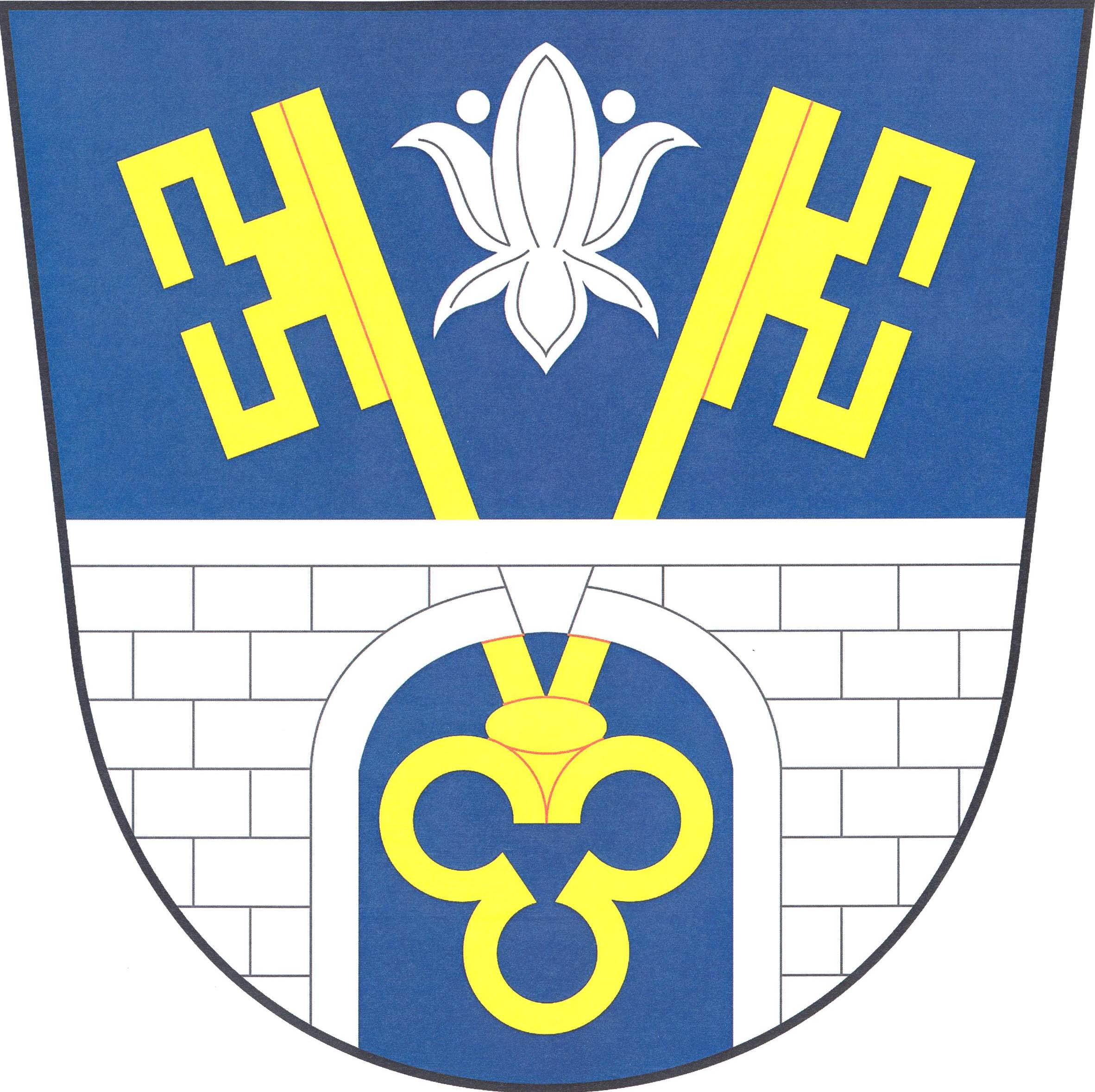
- Flag Coat of arms

- Location in the Czech Republic
- Coordinates: 49°37′43″N 17°52′0″E
- Country: Czech Republic
- Region: Moravian-Silesian
- District: Nový Jičín
- First mentioned: 1282

Area
  - Total: 15.21 km^{2} (5.87 sq mi)
- Elevation: 274 m (899 ft)

Population (2026-01-01)
  - Total: 848
  - Density: 55.8/km^{2} (144/sq mi)
- Time zone: UTC+1 (CET)
  - Summer (DST): UTC+2 (CEST)
- Postal code: 742 35
- Website: www.vrazne.cz

Vražné (German: Petersdorf) is a municipality and village in Nový Jičín District in the Moravian-Silesian Region of the Czech Republic. It has about 800 inhabitants.

== Administrative division ==
Vražné consists of three municipal parts (in brackets population according to the 2021 census):

- Vražné (548)
- Emauzy (45)
- Hynčice (197)

== Demographics ==
Historical population
Year	Pop.	±%
1869	1,568	—
1880	1,495	−4.7%
1890	1,384	−7.4%
1900	1,357	−2.0%
1910	1,357	+0.0%
1921	1,280	−5.7%
1930	1,277	−0.2%
1950	940	−26.4%
1961	1,056	+12.3%
1970	975	−7.7%
1980	877	−10.1%
1991	847	−3.4%
2001	842	−0.6%
2011	822	−2.4%
2021	790	−3.9%
Source: Censuses

== Notable people ==
- Gregor Mendel (1822–1884), Austrian biologist and founder of the modern science of genetics
