= Hynčina =

- Municipality
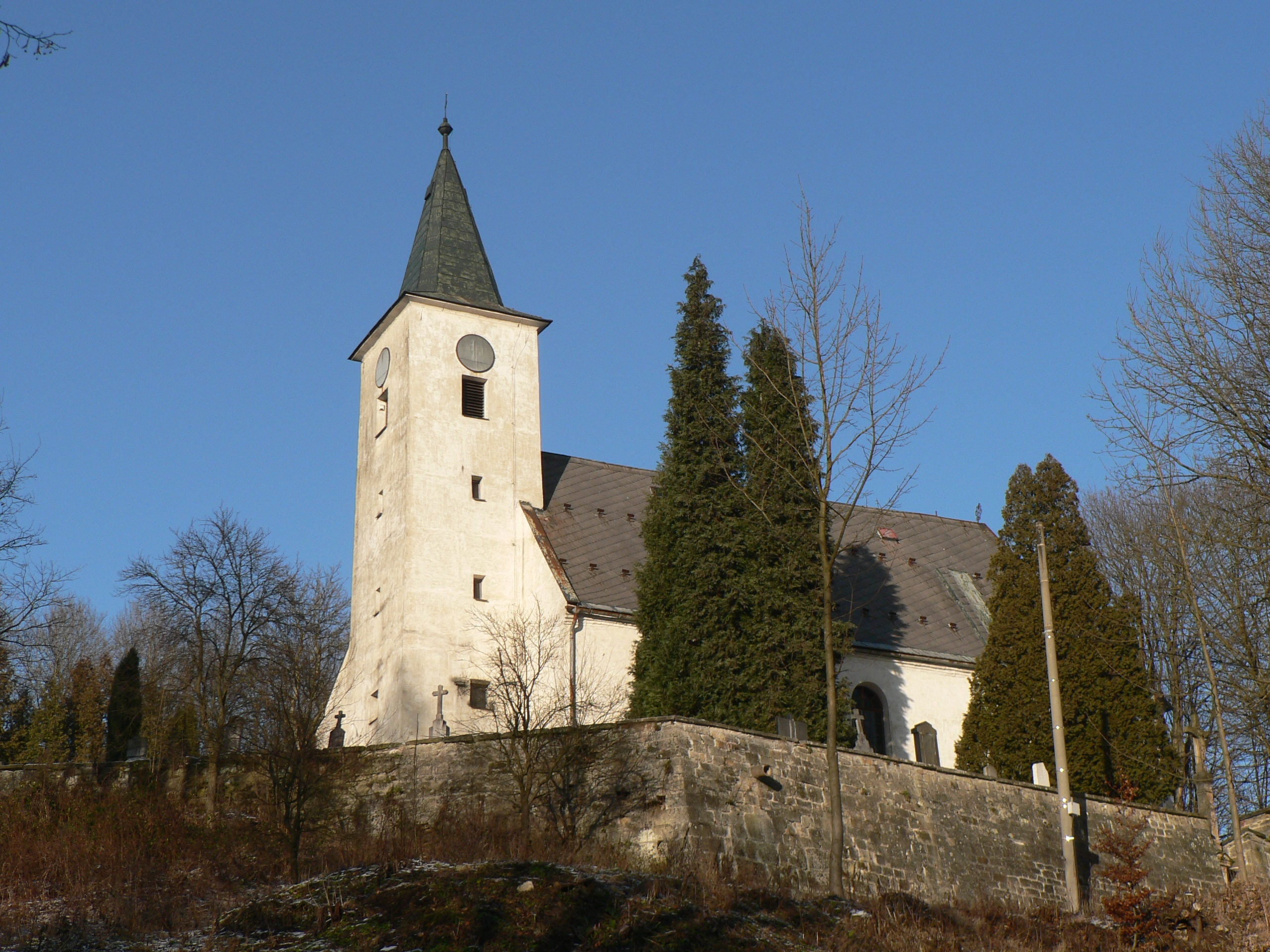
- Church of Saint Stanislaus

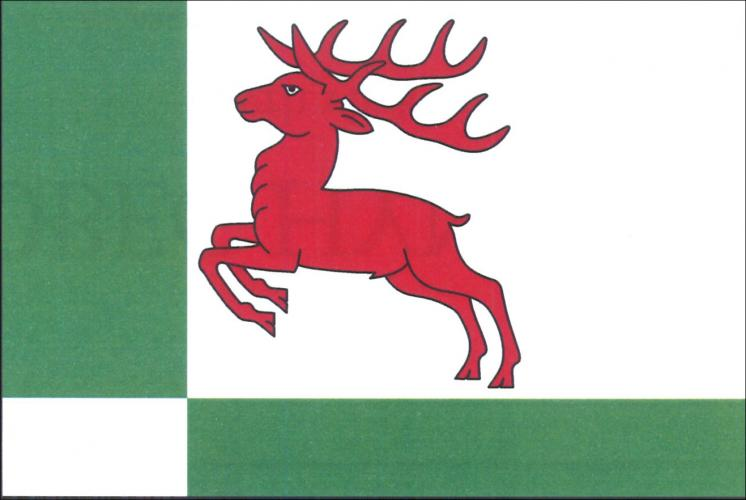
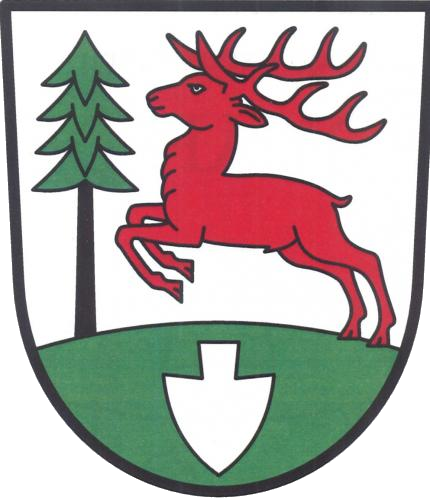
- Flag Coat of arms

- Location in the Czech Republic
- Coordinates: 49°50′55″N 16°47′36″E
- Country: Czech Republic
- Region: Olomouc
- District: Šumperk
- First mentioned: 1273

Area
  - Total: 25.46 km^{2} (9.83 sq mi)
- Elevation: 545 m (1,788 ft)

Population (2026-01-01)
  - Total: 203
  - Density: 7.97/km^{2} (20.7/sq mi)
- Time zone: UTC+1 (CET)
  - Summer (DST): UTC+2 (CEST)
- Postal codes: 789 01
- Website: hyncina.zabrezsko.cz

Hynčina is a municipality and village in Šumperk District in the Olomouc Region of the Czech Republic. It has about 200 inhabitants.

Hynčina lies approximately 19 kilometres (12 mi) south-west of Šumperk, 45 km (28 mi) north-west of Olomouc, and 172 km (107 mi) east of Prague.

== Administrative division ==
Hynčina consists of three municipal parts (in brackets population according to the 2021 census):

- Hynčina (89)
- Dlouhá Ves (41)
- Křižanov (49)

== Demographics ==
Historical population
Year	Pop.	±%
1869	1,757	—
1880	1,727	−1.7%
1890	1,559	−9.7%
1900	1,565	+0.4%
1910	1,397	−10.7%
1921	1,265	−9.4%
1930	1,196	−5.5%
1950	400	−66.6%
1961	419	+4.8%
1970	347	−17.2%
1980	312	−10.1%
1991	212	−32.1%
2001	209	−1.4%
2011	166	−20.6%
2021	179	+7.8%
Source: Censuses
