= Hunter Mountain =

Hunter Mountain or Hunters Mountain may refer to:

== Places ==
In New York, USA

- Hunter Mountain (New York), a mountain in Greene County
  - Hunter Mountain (ski area), on the above mountain
  - Hunter Mountain Fire Tower, on the above mountain
  - Southwest Hunter Mountain, a subpeak of the above mountain

Elsewhere

- Hunter Mountain Shiobara, a ski area in Nasushiobara, Tochigi Prefecture, Japan
- Hunter Mountains, a mountain range in New Zealand
- Hunter's Mountain, Nova Scotia, a community in Canada

== Other uses ==
- Winter Break: Hunter Mountain, 2018 U.S. reality TV show

== See also ==
- Hunter Peak (Colorado), USA; a mountain
- Hunter Peak (Texas), USA; a mountain
- Mount Hunter (disambiguation)
- Hunter hills (disambiguation)
- Hunter (disambiguation)
