= Chasseur (disambiguation) =

Chasseur is a French term for a type of light infantry and the regiments of such infantry.

Chasseur (French: hunter), may also refer to:

== Military ==
- Chasseur-class destroyer, French destroyers of the early 20th century
  - French destroyer Chasseur, lead ship of the eponymous class
- Chasseur (1812 clipper), a Baltimore clipper commanded by Captain Thomas Boyle, one of the most famous American privateers
- Brooklyn Chasseurs, an American Civil War unit
- Chasseur, the French term for pursuit aircraft, i.e. fighter aircraft

== People ==
- Catharina de Chasseur (1490–1541), Dutch counterfeiter
- Blanchette Chasseur (1739–1793), French-Canadian explorer

== Other uses ==
- Le Chasseur, a brand of French cast iron cookware
- Chasseur (sauce), a French brown sauce
- Chasseur, another name for a kepi, a cap with a flat, round top and a stiff visor

== See also ==
- Hunter (disambiguation)
- Huntress (disambiguation)
- Huntsman (disambiguation)
