= Hunter (disambiguation) =

A hunter is a person who hunts.

Hunter may also refer to:

== People ==
=== Name ===
- Hunter (given name)
- Hunter (surname)
- Clan Hunter, a Scottish clan

=== Stage name or nickname ===
- Hunter (rapper), (1975–2011) an Australian rapper and hip-hop artist
- Klaas-Jan Huntelaar, a Dutch footballer nicknamed "The Hunter"

=== Other people ===
- Judge Hunter (disambiguation)
- Justice Hunter (disambiguation)

== Places ==
=== Multiple places ===
- Hunter Mountain (disambiguation)
- Mount Hunter (disambiguation)
- Hunter hills (disambiguation)
- Hunter Island (disambiguation)

=== Australia ===
- Division of Hunter, an electoral district in the Australian House of Representatives, New South Wales
- Hunter Island (Tasmania)
- Hunter Line, a NSW TrainLink passenger train service, New South Wales
- Hunter Valley, an official region of New South Wales
- Hunter River (New South Wales)
- Hunter Valley (disambiguation), a wine region of New South Wales

=== North America ===
==== Canada ====
- Hunter Island (British Columbia)
- Hunter Island (Ontario)

==== United States ====
- Hunter, Arkansas
- Hunter, Illinois (in Boone County)
- Hunter Township, Edgar County, Illinois
- Fontanet, Indiana or Hunter
- Hunter, Kansas
- Hunter Township, Jackson County, Minnesota
- Hunter, Missouri
- Hunter, Nevada
- Hunter, New York
  - Hunter (village), New York
- Hunter Island (Bronx), a peninsula and former island
- Hunter, North Dakota
- Hunter, Belmont County, Ohio
- Hunter, Ohio (in Warren County)
- Hunter, Oklahoma
- Hunter Peak, a mountain in Colorado
- Hunter, Tennessee
- Hunter, Wisconsin
- Hunter (a.k.a. Hunter's or Hunters), a former school and post office at Cold Fork, California

=== Elsewhere ===
- Hunter, Grand Bahama
- Hunter Island (South Pacific), part of the Matthew and Hunter Islands
- Orion (constellation) or The Hunter

== Arts, entertainment, and media ==
=== Films ===
- Hunter (1973 film)
- The Hunter (1980 film)
- Shikari: The Hunter, a 1991 Indian Hindi-language film
- The Hunter (2011 Australian film), a 2011 Australian movie
- Monster Hunter (film) 2020 film
- Vettaiyan (lit. 'Hunter'), a 2024 Indian Tamil-language action drama by T. J. Gnanavel

=== Games ===
- Hunter (video game), a 3D graphic adventure by Activision
- Hunter: The Reckoning, a role-playing game
  - Hunter: The Reckoning (video game), based on the game
- theHunter, an online first-person hunting game series

=== Literature ===
- Hunter, a 1952 autobiography by J. A. Hunter
- Hunter (Pierce novel), 1989, by William Luther Pierce
- Hunter, a 1990 novel by Diana Palmer
- Hunter, a 1995 novel by Charles L. Grant, based on the TV series The X-Files
- Hunter (Huggins novel), 1999, by James Byron Huggins
- Hunter, a 2011 novel by Robert Bidinotto
- Hunter, a 2012 novel by Chris Allen, the second installment in the Alex Morgan series
- Hunter, a 2012 novel by Eric Walters
- Hunter, a 2014 novel by Michael Carroll, the seventh installment in The New Heroes series
- Hunter, a 2015 novel by Mercedes Lackey, the first installment in the Hunter trilogy
- Hunter, a 2018 novel by Lars Kepler
- Hunter, a 2019 novel by Jack Heath, the second installment in the Timothy Blake series
- Hunter, a 2019 novel by Rebecca York, the 20th installment in the Decorah Security series

=== Music ===
==== Groups ====
- Hunter (band), a Polish metal band
- Cunter (band), a Canadian hardcore punk supergroup formerly known as Hunter

==== Albums ====
- Hunter (A Life Once Lost album), 2005
- Hunter (Anna Calvi album), 2018
- Hunter (Key album), 2025

==== Songs ====
- "Hunter" (Björk song)
- "Hunter" (Dido song)
- "Hunter" (Galantis song)
- "Hunter", by Aldous Harding
- "Hunter", by Gotthard from their self-titled debut album

=== Television ===
==== Series ====
- Hunter (1967 TV series), a 1967–1969 Australian espionage series
- Hunter (1977 TV series), a 1977 American espionage television series
- Hunter (1984 American TV series), a 1984–1991 American police detective series
- Hunter (1984 Australian TV series), a 1984–1985 Australian children's programme
- Hunter (British TV serial), a 2009 BBC One sequel drama to Five Days

==== Episodes ====
- "Hunter" (Heated Rivalry), from season one of the Canadian television series

== Businesses ==
- A. Hunter & Son, a London pipe organ builder (1856–1937)
- Hunter Boot Ltd, a Scottish manufacturer of Wellington boots
- Hunter Fan Company, a ceiling fan and lighting company based in Tennessee
- Hunter Industries, a large private corporation in the manufacturing industry
- Hunter Marine, a sailboat manufacturing company

== Education ==
- Hunter College, a college of the City University of New York
- Hunter College High School, a high school in New York City

== Horses ==
- Field hunter, type of horse used in the hunt field for fox hunting
- Show hunter, a horse that competes in the American hunter division, a branch of competitive horse show jumping

== Military ==
=== Military ships ===
- HMS Hunter (1812), a 10-gun brig
- HMS Hunter (1895), a Handy-class destroyer
- HMS Hunter (1945), a tank landing ship
- HMS Hunter (D80), a Bogue-class escort carrier
- HMS Hunter (H35), an H-class destroyer launched in 1936

=== Other military uses ===
- Hawker Hunter, a British subsonic jet fighter from the 1950s and 60s
- Hunter Army Airfield, a U.S. Army airfield near Savannah, Georgia
- RQ-5 Hunter, an unmanned aerial vehicle
- Hunter AFV, a Singaporean tracked armoured fighting vehicle

== Transportation ==
- Hillman Hunter, a small family car produced in the 1960s and 1970s
- New South Wales Hunter railcar, a class of diesel multiple unit operated by NSW TrainLink in New South Wales, Australia
- UAZ Hunter, a Russian off-road military light utility vehicle made by UAZ
- Changan Hunter, a pickup truck

== Other uses ==
- Hunter (watch), a type of pocket watch
- Hunter syndrome, a hereditary disease
- Hunter's bend, a bend knot
- Hunter-gatherer, a human living in a society in which most or all food is obtained by foraging (collecting wild plants and pursuing wild animals)
- Porvoo Hunters, an ice hockey team from Finland
- Hunters, the main antagonists of YouTube series Minecraft Manhunt by Dream (YouTuber)
- Hunter (Bangladeshi beer)

== See also ==
- Hunterrr, a 2015 Hindi film
- The Hunter (disambiguation)
- The Hunters (disambiguation)
- Hunters (disambiguation)
- Hunt (disambiguation)
- Hunting (disambiguation)
- Huntress (disambiguation)
- Huntsman (disambiguation)
- Cacciatore (disambiguation) (Italian: hunter)
- Cazador (disambiguation) (Spanish: hunter)
- Chasseur (disambiguation) (French: hunter)
