= Hunters (disambiguation) =

Hunting is the human practice of seeking, pursuing, capturing, or killing wildlife or feral animals.

Hunters may also refer to:

== Places ==
- hunter hills (disambiguation), including Hunters Hill, Hunters Hills

== Television ==
- Element Hunters, a 2009 anime children's television series
- Hunters (2016 TV series), a 2016 American science-fiction series that aired on Syfy
- Hunters (2020 TV series), a 2020 American drama web television series from Amazon Prime Video
- "Hunters" (Star Trek: Voyager), an episode of Star Trek: Voyager

== Video games ==
- Hunters (video game series), a 2010s mobile game series
- Hunters, a species of Combine Synths in Half-Life
- Hunters, a Covenant species in Halo
- Hunters, special infected in the game Left 4 Dead

== Music ==
- Hunters (album), by The Residents
- The Hunters, a Dutch band whose members included Jan Akkerman
- The Hunters (instrumental band), a British band from the late 1950s to early 1960s

== Sport ==
- Boston Hunters, an upcoming Women's Pro Baseball League team
- Chengdu Hunters, a Chinese esports team in the Overwatch League
- Porvoo Hunters, a Finnish ice hockey team
- Show hunter, a type of equestrian competition, informally called "Hunters"

== See also ==
- The Hunters (disambiguation)
- The Hunter (disambiguation)
- Hunter (disambiguation)
- Hunting (disambiguation)
