= Hunted =

(The) Hunted may refer to:

== Film ==
- Hunted (1952 film), a British film starring Dirk Bogarde
- Hunted (2020 film), a Belgian-French-Irish survival thriller film
- The Hunted (1948 film), an American film noir featuring Preston Foster
- The Hunted (1950 film), a French film directed by Borys Lewin
- The Hunted (1995 film), an American-Japanese film directed by J. F. Lawton and starring Christopher Lambert, Joan Chen and John Lone
- The Hunted (2003 film), an American film directed by William Friedkin and starring Tommy Lee Jones, Benicio del Toro, and Connie Nielsen
- The Hunted (2013 film), an American film directed by Josh Stewart
- The Hunted (Lilly Wachowski screenplay), an unproduced screenplay by Lilly Wachowski and Mickey Ray Mahoney

== Literature ==
- The Hunted (novel) by Elmore Leonard, 1976
- Hunted (Cast novel), a fantasy novel by P.C. Cast and Kristin Cast
- Hunted (Gardner novel), a science fiction novel by James Alan Gardner
- Hunted (Mukherjee novel), Crime and Thriller Book of the Year in 2025 British Book Awards
- Hunted, a novel in The Iron Druid Chronicles series by Kevin Hearne
- Hunted, a collection of novellas in the series Left Behind: The Young Trib Force by Jerry B. Jenkins and Tim LaHaye

== Television ==
- Hunted (2012 TV series), a British–American spy drama
- Hunted (2015 TV series), a British reality television series
  - Hunted (2017 TV series), an American adaptation of the UK series
  - Hunted (Australian TV series), an Australian adaptation of the UK series
- "The Hunted" (Star Trek: The Next Generation), first aired in 1990
- "Hunted" (The Walking Dead), an episode from season 11 of The Walking Dead
- "Hunted", an episode from season 2 of Supernatural
- "Hunted", an episode from season 3 of Teenage Mutant Ninja Turtles (2003 TV series)
- "Hunted", an episode of The Twilight Zone (2002 TV series)
- Ninjago: Hunted, the ninth season in the Ninjago: Masters of Spinjitzu animated television series

== Other uses ==
- Hunted (album), a 2016 LP by Khemmis
- The Hunted (web series), created by Robert Chapin
- Hunted: The Demon's Forge, a 2011 video game
- "The Hunted" (song), a 2019 song by Saint Asonia
- Hunted (podcast), a 2019 podcast starring Parker Posey

== See also ==
- Hunt (disambiguation)
- The Hunt (disambiguation)
- Hunter (disambiguation)
- Hunting (disambiguation)
