= Cacciatore (surname) =

Cacciatore is an Italian surname. Notable people with the surname include:

- Fabrizio Cacciatore (born 1986), Italian footballer
- Frank Cacciatore (born 1955), American baseball player, coach and manager
- Giuseppe Cacciatore (1945–2023), Italian philosopher
- Jeff Cacciatore (born 1958), American soccer player
- Lorena Cacciatore (born 1987), Italian actress
- Luigi Cacciatore (1900–1951), Italian politician
- Niccolò Cacciatore (1770–1841), Italian astronomer
- Osvaldo Cacciatore (1924–2007), Argentine Air Force brigadier
- Steve Cacciatore (born 1954), American soccer player

== Other ==
- Benedetto Santapaola (born 1938), mafioso from Catania, his nickname is il cacciatore
- Sampson "Sammy" Cacciatore and Mary Jo Cacciatore, characters from Blue Mountain State
- Mike "Mooch" Cacciatore, character from Wiseguy (TV series)
- Mr. Cacciatore, character from "Movin' Out (Anthony's Song)" by Billy Joel

== See also ==
- Cacciatore (disambiguation)
- Cacciatore
- Cacciatori (surname)
