= Huntsman =

A huntsman is a hunter, especially a fox hunter.

Huntsman or huntsmen or variation, may also refer to:

== People ==
- Huntsman (surname)
- Huntsmen (military), a medieval and renaissance soldier type

=== Characters ===
- Huntsman (American Dragon: Jake Long), a character on American Dragon: Jake Long
- Huntsman (Doctor Who), Wolf Weed Whipper in the Doctor Who serial "The Creature From the Pit", 1979
- Huntsman (Weapon XII), Marvel Comics X-Men villain
- Huntsman (Cephalus), Marvel Comics servant of Zeus
- Huntsman (Heroic Publishing), a member of the League of Champions
- The Huntsman (Freakazoid), a character on Freakazoid
- Wild Huntsman (comics), a heroic character from DC Comics
- Huntsman (Snow White), a character from the Grimm fairy tale Snow White
- The Huntsman/Sheriff Graham Humbert, a fictional character from the ABC television series Once Upon a Time

== Places ==
- Huntsman, neighborhood in Springfield, Virginia
- Lake Huntsman, a reservoir in Tasmania, Australia

=== Facilities and structures ===
- Huntsman (chemical plant), a major Australian chemical plant of the Huntsman Corporation
- Huntsman Lake Power Station, Lake Huntsman, Tasmania, Australia
- Huntsman Cancer Institute, world-class cancer research center named after Jon and Karen Huntsman on the University of Utah Campus
- Jon M. Huntsman Center, the University of Utah's main sports arena, named after Jon M. Huntsman Sr.
- Jon M. Huntsman Sr. Hall, main hall for the Wharton School of the University of Pennsylvania

== Animals ==
- Huntsman spider, a large spider commonly found in Australia
- The Huntsman (horse), a racehorse who won the 1862 Grand National steeplechase run

== Arts and entertainment ==
=== Literature ===
- Huntsman (series), a young adult science fiction series written by Douglas Hill
  - The Huntsman, a 1983 novel by Douglas Hill in the YA series Huntsman
- "The Huntsman" (short story), an 1885 short story by Anton Chekhov

=== Film ===
- Snow White and the Huntsman, a 2012 film
- The Huntsman: Winter's War, a 2016 film

== Court functions ==
- Grand Huntsman of France
- Grand Huntsman of Brabant

== Groups, companies, organizations ==
- Huntsman Corporation, an American multinational manufacturer and marketer of chemical products
- Huntsman Program in International Studies and Business
- Jon M. Huntsman School of Business, the School of Business at Utah State University
- H. Huntsman & Sons, a Savile Row tailor
- Chicago Huntsmen, an eSports team for Call of Duty

== Other uses ==
- Huntsman cheese, a combination of Double Gloucester and Stilton
- Huntsman World Senior Games
- AS9 Huntsman, Australian self-propelled artillery, version of the Korean K9 Thunder

== See also ==
- Huntress (disambiguation)
- Hunter (disambiguation)
- Hunt (disambiguation)
- Man (disambiguation)
