= Cacciatore (disambiguation) =

Cacciatore (Italian: pollo alla cacciatora, lit. 'hunter-style chicken') is an Italian dish.

Cacciatore (Italian: hunter) may also refer to:

- Cacciatore (surname), an Italian surname
- Benedetto Santapaola (born 1938), mafioso from Catania, nicknamed il cacciatore
- Cacciatore Stadium, DePaul University, Chicago, Illinois, USA
- Cacciatore: The Hunter (2018 TV series), an Italian TV show, also called Il Cacciatore, Cacciatore, The Hunter

== See also ==
- Cacciatori (surname)
- Hunter (disambiguation)
- Huntress (disambiguation)
- Huntsman (disambiguation)
