= Mount Hunter =

Mount Hunter may refer to:

== Mountains ==
- Mount Hunter (Antarctica)
- Mount Hunter (British Columbia), Canada
- Mount Hunter (Alaska), USA

== Other uses ==
- Mount Hunter, New South Wales, Australia; a town, site of the residence of Mark Latham

== See also ==
- Hunter Peak (Colorado), USA; a mountain
- Hunter Peak (Texas), USA; a mountain
- Hunter Mountain (disambiguation)
- hunter hills (disambiguation)
- Hunter (disambiguation)
