= Hunts Green =

Hunts Green or Hunt's Green may refer to:

- Hunts Green, Berkshire, England, UK
- Hunt's Green, Buckinghamshire, England, UK
- Hunts Green, Warwickshire, England, UK

== See also ==
- Green (disambiguation)
- Hunt (disambiguation)
