= Huntress =

A huntress is a woman who engages in the act of hunting. A stock character in fantasy fiction.

Huntress may also refer to:

== People ==
- Harriet Lane Huntress (1860-1922), Deputy Superintendent Public Instruction in New Hampshire, U.S.
- Wesley Huntress, U.S. space scientist

=== Fictional characters ===
- Huntress, also known as Mockingbird, a Marvel Comics character that first appeared in 1971
- Huntress (DC Comics), the name of several DC Comics characters, including:
  - Huntress, an identity of Paula Brooks, a Golden Age supervillain character
  - Huntress (Helena Wayne), a superhero character that first appeared in 1977
  - Huntress (Helena Bertinelli), a superhero character that first appeared in 1989
- Huntress Wizard, a character in the animated series Adventure Time

== Places ==
- Huntress Glacier, Livingston Island, South Shetland Islands
- 7225 Huntress, the asteroid 'Huntress'

== Film ==
- The Huntress (film), a 1923 American drama film
- The Huntresses (2014 film), a 2014 South Korean period action film

== Television ==
- The Huntress (TV series), a 2000 American crime drama series

== Literature ==
- The Huntress, a 19th-century American periodical published by Anne Royall
- The Huntress, a 1922 novel by Hulbert Footner
- Huntress, a 1997 novel by L. J. Smith, the seventh installment in the Night World series
- Huntress, a 1999 collected edition of the Elfquest: Hidden Years comic series, Book 11a in the Reader's Collection series
- The Huntress, a 2007 novel by Susan Carroll, the fourth installment in The Dark Queen Saga
- Huntress, a 2009 anthology featuring short stories by Christine Warren, Marjorie M. Liu, Caitlin Kittredge, and Jenna Maclaine
- Huntress, a 2011 young adult fantasy novel by Malinda Lo
- The Huntress, a 2019 novel by Kate Quinn

== Vehicles ==
- USS Huntress, a U.S. Navy ship name
- Huntress (schooner), a U.S. schooner

== Other uses ==
- Huntress (band), a California metal band
- The Huntress (TV series), a 2000s television series about a female bounty hunter
- Huntress Labs, a cybersecurity company founded by Kyle Hanslovan

== See also ==
- Hunt (disambiguation)
- Hunter (disambiguation)
- Huntsman (disambiguation)
- Hunting (disambiguation)
