= Hunter Island =

Hunter Island may refer to:

- Hunter Island (Tasmania), Australia; an island in the Bass Strait
  - Hunter Island Group Important Bird Area, Australia; an island
- Hunter Island, Sullivans Cove, Hobart, Tasmania, Australia; an islet
- Hunter Island (British Columbia), Canada; an island
- Hunter Island (Ontario), Canada; an island
- Hunter Island, an island of Alaska, U.S.
- Hunter's Island, Palm Beach, Florida, U.S.; an island
- Hunter Island (Bronx), New York City, New York State, U.S.; an island
- Matthew and Hunter Islands, uninhabited high islands in the South Pacific
- Hunter Island, alternate name for Onaseuse, a phantom island near Fiji.

== See also ==
- Hunter's Isle, Hunter's Creek, Florida, USA; a neighborhood
- Hunter (disambiguation)
