= Huntz =

Huntz may refer to:

- Henry Richard "Huntz" Hall (1920–1999), American radio, stage, and movie performer
- Steve Huntz (born 1945), retired American professional baseball player

== See also ==
- Hunt's sauce and condiment brand
- Hunt (disambiguation)
