= List of the most common passwords =

This is a list of the most common passwords, discovered in various data breaches. Common passwords are generally not recommended on account of low password strength.

== List ==
=== NordPass ===
In 2025, NordPass, a password manager, released its seventh annual list of the 200 most common passwords. The top twenty most frequently used passwords are:

Top 20 most common passwords according to NordPass
Rank	Password	Count of password uses
1	123456	21,627,656
2	admin	21,030,012
3	12345678	8,274,408
4	123456789	5,673,712
5	12345	3,950,777
6	password	3,545,119
7	Aa123456	2,520,728
8	1234567890	1,418,939
9	Pass@123	1,210,039
10	admin123	1,087,247
11	1234567	1,084,354
12	123123	1,060,563
13	111111	990,391
14	12345678910	988,396
15	P@ssw0rd	770,658
16	Password	755,709
17	Aa@123456	735,141
18	admintelecom	585,620
19	Admin@123	579,512
20	112233	576,908

=== SplashData ===
The Worst Passwords List is an annual list of the 25 most common passwords from each year as produced by internet security firm SplashData. Since 2011, the firm has published the list based on data examined from millions of passwords leaked in data breaches, mostly in North America and Western Europe, over each year. In the 2016 edition, the 25 most common passwords made up more than 10% of the surveyed passwords, with the most common password of 2016, "123456", making up 4%.

Top 25 most common passwords by year according to SplashData
Rank	2011	2012	2013	2014	2015	2016	2017	2018	2019
1	password	password	123456	123456	123456	123456	123456	123456	123456
2	123456	123456	password	password	password	password	password	password	123456789
3	12345678	12345678	12345678	12345	12345678	12345	12345678	123456789	qwerty
4	qwerty	abc123	qwerty	12345678	qwerty	12345678	qwerty	12345678	password
5	abc123	qwerty	abc123	qwerty	12345	football	12345	12345	1234567
6	monkey	monkey	123456789	123456789	123456789	qwerty	123456789	111111	12345678
7	1234567	letmein	111111	1234	football	1234567890	letmein	1234567	12345
8	letmein	dragon	1234567	baseball	1234	1234567	1234567	sunshine	iloveyou
9	trustno1	111111	iloveyou	dragon	1234567	princess	football	qwerty	111111
10	dragon	baseball	adobe123 (Note: The presence of "adobe123" and "photoshop" on 2013's list was skewed by the large number of Adobe passwords included in the collected data due to a major security breach in 2013 that affected over 48 million Adobe users.)	football	baseball	1234	iloveyou	iloveyou	123123
11	baseball	iloveyou	123123	1234567	welcome	login	admin	princess	abc123
12	111111	trustno1	admin	monkey	1234567890	welcome	welcome	admin	qwerty123
13	iloveyou	1234567	1234567890	letmein	abc123	solo	monkey	welcome	1q2w3e4r
14	master	sunshine	letmein	abc123	111111	abc123	login	666666	admin
15	sunshine	master	photoshop	111111	1qaz2wsx	admin	abc123	abc123	qwertyuiop
16	ashley	123123	1234	mustang	dragon	121212	starwars	football	654321
17	bailey	welcome	monkey	access	master	flower	123123	123123	555555
18	passw0rd	shadow	shadow	shadow	monkey	passw0rd	dragon	monkey	lovely
19	shadow	ashley	sunshine	master	letmein	dragon	passw0rd	654321	7777777
20	123123	football	12345	michael	login	sunshine	master	!@#$%^&*	welcome
21	654321	jesus	password1	superman	princess	master	hello	charlie	888888
22	superman	michael	princess	696969	qwertyuiop	hottie	freedom	aa123456	princess
23	qazwsx	ninja	azerty	123123	solo	loveme	whatever	donald	dragon
24	michael	mustang	trustno1	batman	passw0rd	zaq1zaq1	qazwsx	password1	password1
25	Football	password1	000000	trustno1	starwars	password1	trustno1	qwerty123	123qwe

=== Keeper ===
Password manager Keeper compiled its own list of the 25 most common passwords in 2016, from 25 million passwords leaked in data breaches that year.

Top 25 most common passwords according to Keeper
Rank	2016
1	123456
2	123456789
3	qwerty
4	12345678
5	111111
6	1234567890
7	1234567
8	password
9	123123
10	987654321
11	qwertyuiop
12	mynoob
13	123321
14	666666
15	18atcskd2w
16	7777777
17	1q2w3e4r
18	654321
19	555555
20	3rjs1la7qe
21	google
22	1q2w3e4r5t
23	123qwe
24	zxcvbnm
25	1q2w3e

=== National Cyber Security Centre ===
The National Cyber Security Centre (NCSC) hosts a list, compiled by Troy Hunt of Have I Been Pwned?, of the top 100 thousand passwords leaked in data breaches as of 2019.

Top 20 most common passwords according to NCSC and HIBP
Rank	2019
1	123456
2	123456789
3	qwerty
4	password
5	1111111
6	12345678
7	abc123
8	1234567
9	password1
10	12345
11	1234567890
12	123123
13	000000
14	Iloveyou
15	1234
16	1q2w3e4r5t
17	Qwertyuiop
18	123
19	Monkey
20	Dragon

=== Huntress ===
The most common passwords of 2026, according to Huntress.

Rank	Password
1	123456
2	123456789
3	12345678
4	password
5	qwerty123
6	qwerty1
7	111111
8	12345
9	secret
10	123123
11	1234567890
12	1234567
13	000000
14	qwerty
15	abc123
16	password1
17	iloveyou
18	11111111
19	dragon
20	monkey

== See also ==
- Password cracking
- Password dictionary
