= Hunt (disambiguation) =

A hunt is the act of pursuing and capturing or killing wild animals.

Hunt or hunts may also refer to:

== Arts and entertainment ==
- Hunt (painting), a 2002 painting by Neo Rauch
- Hunt (2022 film), a South Korean film
- Hunt (2023 film), an Indian Telugu-language action thriller film
- Hunt (2024 film), an Indian Malayalam-language horror thriller film
- "Hunt", a song by Goldfrapp from the album Head First

== Businesses ==
- Hunt Petroleum, an oil and gas company formed in 1950, now part of XTO Energy
- Hunt Oil Company, an independent oil and gas company headquartered in Dallas, Texas
- Hunt Refining Company, a refiner of asphalt
- Hunt's, a brand of tomato products
- J. B. Hunt, an American transportation and logistics company

== People and fictional characters ==
- Hunt (surname), a list of people and fictional characters
- Hunt (given name), a list of people and fictional characters

== Places and geographical features ==
- Hunt, Ohio, an unincorporated community in Ohio, USA
- Hunt, Texas, an unincorporated town in Texas, USA
- McFarland, California, a city in California, USA, formerly called Hunt
- Hunts Bay, a bay on the Gower Peninsula, Wales
- Hunts Creek, a creek in Greater Western Sydney, New South Wales, Australia
- Hunts Mesa, a mesa in Monument Valley, Arizona, USA
- Hunts Peak, a mountain in Colorado, USA
- Hunts Pond, a pond in Chenango County, New York State, USA
- Hunts Run, a creek in Sullivan County, Pennsylvania, USA
- Huntingdonshire, abbreviated Hunts, a non-metropolitan district of Cambridgeshire and a historic county of England

== Ships ==
- Hunt-class (disambiguation), three British Royal Navy ship classes
- USS Hunt (DD-194), a Clemson-class destroyer commissioned in 1919
- USS Hunt (DD-674), a Fletcher-class destroyer commissioned in 1943

== Other uses ==
- Hunt, a fox hunting club
- 23041 Hunt, an asteroid

== See also ==
- The Hunt (disambiguation)
- Hunt model, a mathematical description of human color vision
- Hunts Corners (disambiguation)
- Hunts Green (disambiguation)
- Hunts Point (disambiguation)
- Hunt Valley (disambiguation)
- Hunted (disambiguation)
- Hunter (disambiguation)
- The Hunter (disambiguation)
- The Hunters (disambiguation)
- Huntress (disambiguation)
- Hunting (disambiguation)
- Huntly (disambiguation)
