= Hunts Corners =

Hunts Corners, Hunt's Corner, Hunt Corner, or, variation, may refer to:

- Hunts Corners, Ohio, USA; an unincorporated community in Lyme Township, Huron County
- Hunts Corners, New York State, USA; a hamlet in Clarence township, Erie County
- Hunts Corner, New York State, USA; a hamlet in Tusten township, Sullivan County

== See also ==
- Hunt's Cross, Liverpool, Merseyside, England, UK
- Hunt (disambiguation)
- Corner (disambiguation)
