= Hunt Valley =

Hunt Valley may refer to:

- Hunt Valley, Maryland

- Hunt Valley (Baltimore Light Rail station)

- Hunt Valley Towne Centre (formerly Hunt Valley Mall)

== See also ==
- Valley (disambiguation)
- Hunt (disambiguation)
