= Cacciatori =

Cacciatori is an Italian surname. Notable people with the surname include:

- Fabio Massimo Cacciatori (born 1961), Italian entrepreneur and film producer
- Maurizia Cacciatori (born 1973), Italian volleyball player and sport commentator

== See also ==
- Cacciatore (surname)
- Cacciatore (disambiguation)
