= Hunts Point =

Hunts Point may refer to:

- Hunts Point, Bronx, a neighborhood in New York City
  - Hunts Point Avenue station
  - Hunts Point station
  - Hunts Point Department of Public Safety
  - Hunts Point Food Distribution Center, current home of the
    - new Fulton Fish Market
    - Hunts Point Cooperative Market (meat market)
    - New York City Terminal Market (produce market)
  - Hunts Point Hospital
  - Hunts Point Riverside Park
- Hunts Point, Washington, United States
- Hunt's Point, Nova Scotia, Canada

== See also ==
- Hunt (disambiguation)
- Point (disambiguation)
