= Whitfield School =

Private school in Creve Coeur, Missouri, US

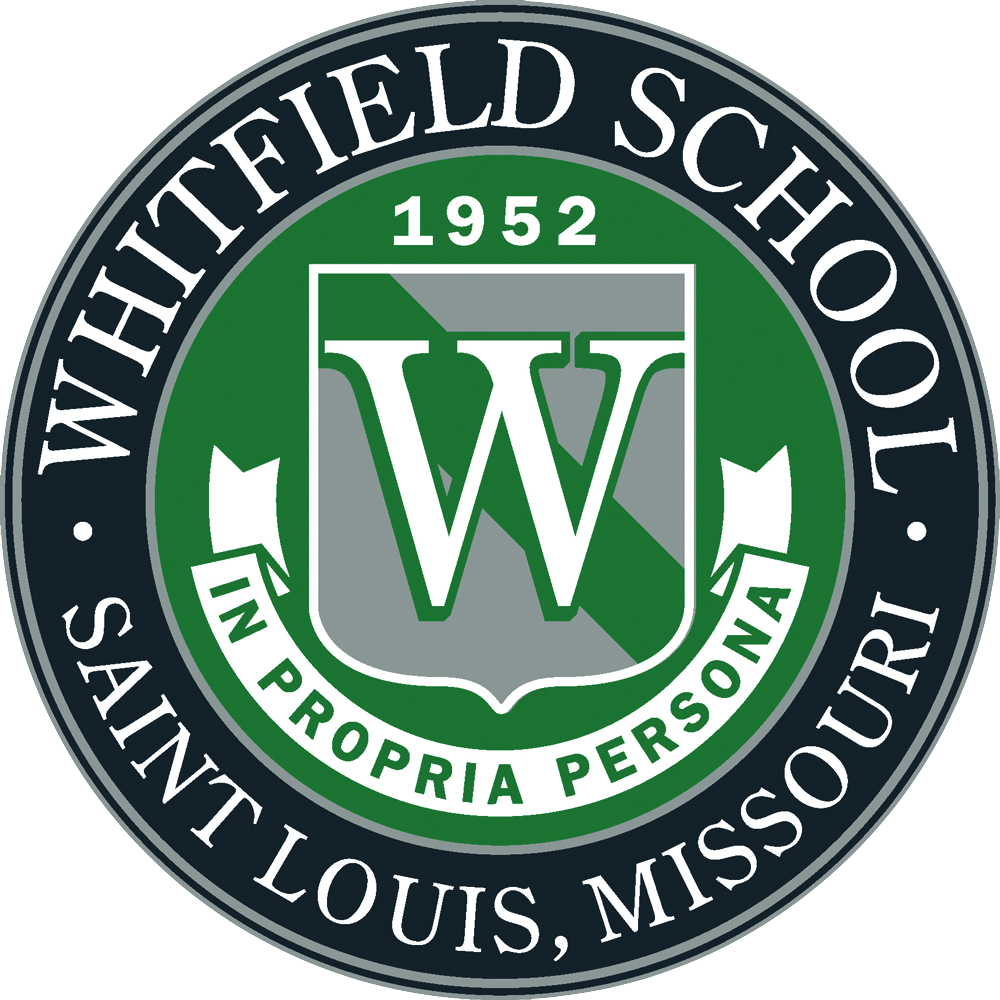

Location
- 175 South Mason Road; Creve Coeur, Missouri 63141; 38°39′14″N 90°28′53″W

Information
- Type: Private college-preparatory school
- Motto: Latin: In Propria Persona (In one's own person)
- Established: 1952; 74 years ago
- Principal: Chris Cunningham
- Faculty: 60
- Grades: 6–12
- Enrollment: 400
- Colors: Green and white
- Slogan: Be kind and do the right thing.
- Athletics conference: Metro League
- Nickname: Warriors
- Accreditation: Cognia
- Endowment: $19.1 million (2026)
- Annual tuition: $37,400
- Website: whitfieldschool.org

Whitfield School, founded in 1952, is a private, nonsectarian college-preparatory school with more than 400 students in grades 6–12. The campus is in Creve Coeur, Missouri, United States, a suburb of St. Louis.

== History ==
In 1952 John Barnes and Allen Cole purchased Dumford Academy, located on Bartmer Avenue, and renamed it Whitfield School.

During spring break of 1957, Barnes and Cole and the school moved into a residential house in Creve Coeur, some of which had been converted into classrooms. The house became the nucleus of the current campus; it now serves as administrative offices as well as a meeting and congregating facility, and has come to be named the "Barnes and Cole Alumni House".

The fourth head of school, Mary Leyhe Burke, raised money to build a new building on the land next to the house; this building was completed in the early 1990s. Whitfield then received major additions, as well as several renovations in the 1990s and 2000s.

In 2002, the school added new gymnasiums, locker rooms, a weight room with coaches' offices, a new dance studio and a new music studio. The project added backstage space for the theatre department, new computer commons areas, as well as a library, called the Intellectual Commons, in a former gym. It also added an atrium, visible from nearby Ladue Road, as an entrance to the Cady Athletic Center and Woods Hall.

In 2022, work in the humanities wing turned an area informally known as Stonehenge into the Koman Commons, a large staircase designed for seating and out-of-classroom teaching nicknamed the Whit Pit. An outside terrace was also improved.

== Academics ==
Students in grades 6–12 take required courses each year in the following departments: English, social studies, science, mathematics, and language. Fine arts requirements, including music, theater and visual art, change as students get older. Whitfield classrooms average 12 students per class, and the teacher-student ratio is 1:8.

== Arts ==
Whitfield Performing Arts takes an experimental approach to the way that the main stage shows are executed. Whitfield School is part of the International Thespian Society and is chapter #5436. The school often employs professional costumers, lighting and sound technicians, and scenic designers.

== Athletics ==
Three-quarters of Whitfield's high-school students participate in athletics. All students are guaranteed a spot on a high school team; coaches determine whether they play varsity or junior varsity. Playing time depends on an athlete's aptitude and effort. Students may also choose to participate as coaches' assistants, team managers, or videographers.

Whitfield School has had a consistently successful soccer team led by Coach Bill Daues and assistant coaches Mike Quante, Jeff Cacciatore, a former college and indoor soccer star, and Luke Cano. Since 2001, Whitfield's soccer team has won seven state championships; that is seven out of nine state championships in Missouri Class 1 soccer since there have been three classes. In 2009, Whitfield regained the title after beating Springfield Catholic 1–0 in the final. In 2010, the Warriors took on Springfield Catholic again, and again they won 1–0 with a goal from Nick Doherty. Notable rivalries for soccer are John Burroughs School, Westminster, Bayless, Springfield Catholic, and Pembroke Hill.

Whitfield's wrestling program operates under the direction of Coach Charlie Sherertz: a three-time honoree as Missouri wrestling coach of the year. The varsity wrestling team has won three state titles in five years (2008, 2009, and 2012). In 2012, five Whitfield Warriors earned individual state titles: Rodney Hahn '14, Will Hahn '13, Ethan Sherertz '12, Austin Smith '12, and Chris Wilkes '13. A successful run between 2015 and 2018 yielded the Warriors another three team state titles, with individual wins from Michael McAteer '15, '16, '17, '18, Max Darrah, '16, '17, Sky Darrah '15, JR Ditter '15, '18, Connor McAteer '18, Logan Ferrero '18, Zac Russell '18, and Kurtis Hahn '16.

Whitfield School won its first Wickenheiser Cup in varsity hockey in March 2008. The previous year, Whitfield Hockey had lost to Priory 4–3 in the Wickenheiser Cup Final. In 2011, the Whitfield hockey team won the Founder's Cup by beating Parkway South High School 7–5, and Nick Kunin was named the MVP of the game. In 2012, the Warriors won their second Wickenheiser Cup Championship by defeating Lutheran High School South 6 to 5 in an exciting game that was tied through regulation and the 10-minute sudden death period. MVP senior Hunt Lucas scored the only goal in the shoot out, and junior goalie Alan Eidelman stopped all three chances to secure the win. Ryan MacInnis led the Warriors scoring with one goal and two assists. Whitfield Hockey is coached by former Blues player Jim Campbell.

Whitfield's varsity dance squad won the 2008, 2009, 2011, 2012, 2013 and 2015 state championship in the 1A division, and advanced to a national competition in 2008, where the team won first place in pom in the extra small division.

Whitfield's boys basketball team won the state championships in 2000. Two consecutive appearances in the state championship in 2009 and 2010 resulted in 2nd and 3rd places finishes, respectively.

Coached by Harold Barker, the varsity golf team won the 2010 and 2011 state championship. The team's 2011 campaign was highlighted by Mitch Rutledge who shot scores of 74 and 71 to capture medalist honors.

== Publications ==
Whitfield has several publications, both traditional and innovative. All of the school's publications are extracurricular and student-run. Most publications are named after Greek works of literature.

The school's yearbook, The Iliad, is published annually and is designed by students with the help of a faculty advisor.

The school's newspaper, The Odyssey, used to be published monthly and was student-run and edited, with a faculty advisor. This paper contained featured articles about large-scale issues that affect society, movies and other forms of entertainment, and school-wide news and polls. The newspaper has been disbanded.

The school's online magazine, The Aeneid, offered more time-sensitive articles and addressed more urgent issues than The Odyssey. The publication was entirely student-edited and run. It has also been disbanded.

The school's literary magazine, previously known as The Secret Voice, is published once a year and contains works of art and literature, submitted throughout the course of the year by students and faculty. These anonymous submissions are reviewed by a selection committee which decides, based on several factors, what should be included in that year's edition. In 2022 it shifted towards a more virtual version called Perceptions, where students art is showcased throughout the year virtually, rather than in a physical book.

== Traditions ==
Every year students adopt a family from the St. Patrick Center, a local charitable organization that supports the unhoused, and help them have a special holiday season. In the spring, Whitfield students hosts a Red Cross blood drive. In the spring, students collect cans for Whitfield's canned food drive in order to help Operation Food Search.

Whitfield School has a school dog, a golden retriever named Sunshine. Sunshine visits numerous classes daily. Sunshine is Whitfield's fourth dog.

== Notable alumni ==
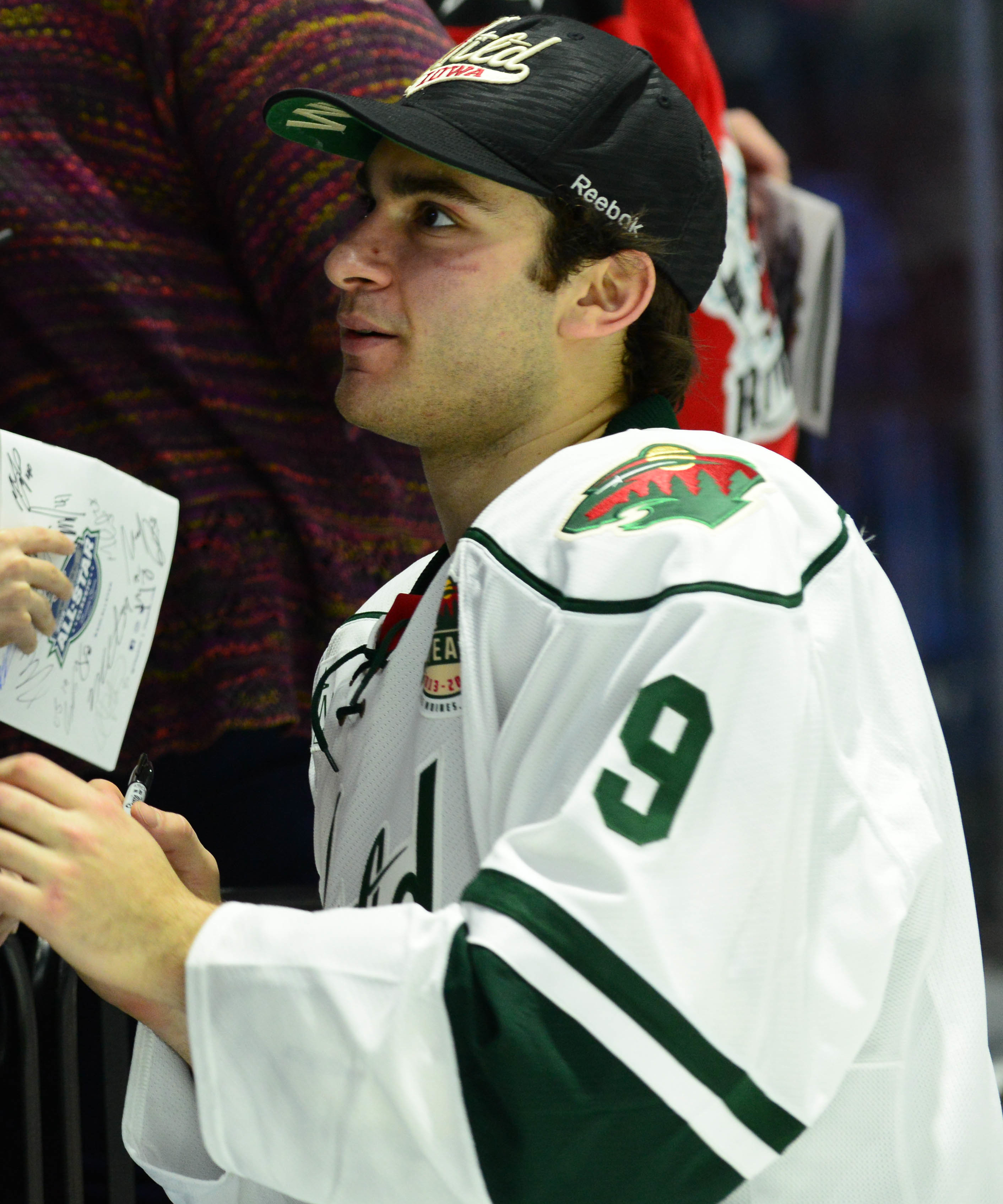
Luke Kunin

- Mackenzie Fierceton, activist
- Luke Kunin, NHL hockey player
- James Monsees, co-founder of Juul Labs
