= Hunting (disambiguation) =

Hunting is the practice of pursuing animals to capture or kill them. Predation is the hunting of animals by other animals.

Hunting may also refer to:

== Geography ==
- Hunting, Moselle, a village in the French department of Moselle
- Hunting, Wisconsin, United States, a former unincorporated community

== Film and television ==
- Hunting (film), 1991 Australian film
- "Hunting" (House), a 2005 episode of the television series House
- The Hunting, a 2019 Australian TV series
- "Hunting" (Succession), a 2019 episode of the television series Succession

== Companies ==
- Hunting Aircraft, a former British aircraft manufacturer (1933–1959); consumed into what, at 2010, is BAE Systems
- Hunting-Clan Air Transport, a former private British airline (1946–1960); consumed into what, at 2010, is British United Airways
- Hunting Engineering, a former engineering company, which later became INSYS (2001) and, as of 2005, is now part of Lockheed Martin Corporation
- Hunting plc, a British oil and gas company

== Other uses ==
- Hunting (surname), a list of people and fictional characters
- Hunting (Carracci), a canvas by Italian painter Annibale Carracci, dated before 1595
- Hunting oscillation, a self-exciting oscillation, also known as shimmy, a side-to-side instability seen in railway trains

== See also ==
- Hunt (disambiguation)
- Hunted (disambiguation)
- Hunter (disambiguation)
- Huntress (disambiguation)
