= Luke Kunin =

American ice hockey player (born 1997)

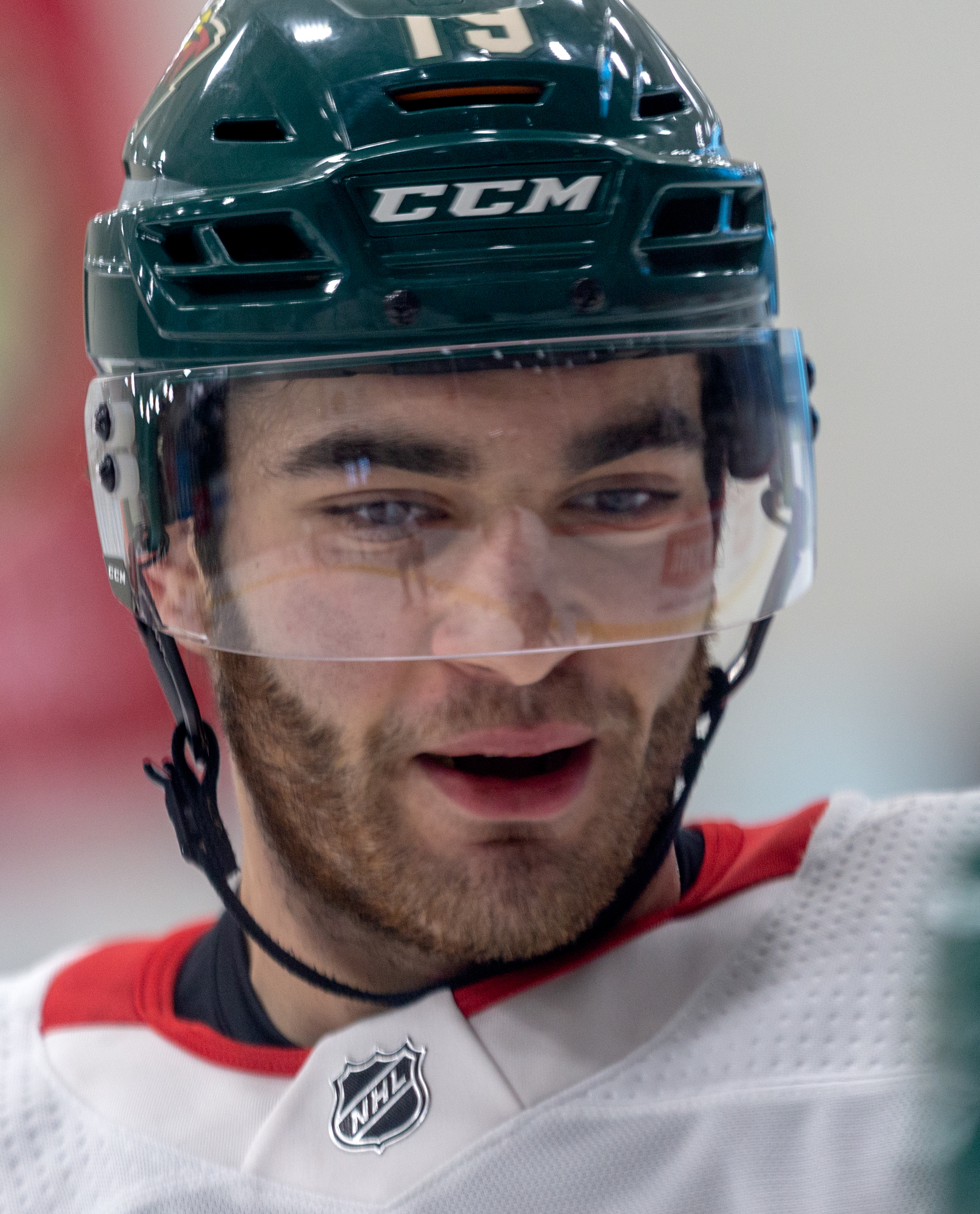
- Kunin with the Minnesota Wild in 2019
- Born: December 4, 1997 (age 28) Chesterfield, Missouri, U.S.
- Height: 6 ft 0 in (183 cm)
- Weight: 197 lb (89 kg; 14 st 1 lb)
- Position: Center
- Shoots: Right
- NHL team Former teams: Free agent Minnesota Wild; Nashville Predators; San Jose Sharks; Columbus Blue Jackets; Florida Panthers
- National team: United States
- NHL draft: 15th overall, 2016; Minnesota Wild
- Playing career: 2017–present

Luke Kunin (/kʌnɪn/ KUH-nin; born December 4, 1997) is an American professional ice hockey player who is a center and currently an unrestricted free agent. He most recently played for the Florida Panthers of the National Hockey League (NHL). He previously played in the NHL for the Minnesota Wild, Nashville Predators, San Jose Sharks and Columbus Blue Jackets. The Wild selected him in the first round, 15th overall, in the 2016 NHL entry draft.

Born in Chesterfield, Missouri, Kunin had a number of NHL players for coaches during his minor ice hockey career, including Keith Tkachuk, whose son Matthew he played alongside as a child. Kunin spent one year at the Whitfield School before joining the USA Hockey National Team Development Program, with whom he played in the World U-17 Hockey Challenge and the IIHF World U18 Championship. He finished high school early to begin playing college ice hockey with the Wisconsin Badgers. There, Kunin became the first sophomore to captain the Badgers in over 40 years, while also captaining the United States team at the IIHF World Junior Championship.

After two years with Wisconsin, Kunin signed a contract with the Wild. He spent the 2017–18 season jumping between Minnesota and the Iowa Wild of the American Hockey League (AHL), in part due to NHL salary cap difficulties, but was supposed to finish out the year in Minnesota if not for an anterior cruciate ligament injury in March 2018. Kunin recovered by the start of the 2018–19 season and spent most of the year in the NHL, only returning to Iowa to help them during the postseason. After spending time on a Minnesota line with Jordan Greenway and Joel Eriksson Ek, Kunin was traded to the Predators prior to the 2020–21 season. After a slow start to the year, he finished on a scoring streak, including a double-overtime victory over the Carolina Hurricanes in the 2021 Stanley Cup playoffs.

== Early life ==
Kunin was born on December 4, 1997, in Chesterfield, Missouri, to Mark and Sheri Kunin. He began playing minor ice hockey for a youth affiliate of the St. Louis Blues, and was coached by former professional hockey players like Keith Tkachuk, Jeff Brown, Al MacInnis, and Jamie Rivers. He spent one year attending the Whitfield School and playing for the Warriors hockey team before USA Hockey National Team Development Program (NTDP) in Ann Arbor, Michigan. Kunin played in the NTDP for two seasons, and in his second year with the team, he scored 27 goals and 42 points in 61 games. Kunin, Matthew Tkachuk, and Clayton Keller all played together in the 2010 Quebec International Pee-Wee Hockey Tournament with their St. Louis minor hockey team. Kunin finished high school in only three years so that he could continue his hockey career at the age of 17.

When he was in sixth grade, Kunin was diagnosed with type 1 diabetes, and in addition to finding ways to manage his condition on the ice, he found an inspiration in professional hockey player and fellow diabetic B. J. Crombeen of the Blues. Kunin also leaned on his older brother Nick, whose own hockey career was cut short by a series of concussions, for support as he became accustomed to managing his condition.

== Playing career ==
=== NCAA ===
On May 24, 2013, Kunin committed to play college ice hockey for the Wisconsin Badgers, starting in the 2015–16 season. As he had finished high school early, Kunin entered the program as the youngest skater on the team, but he impressed coach Mike Eaves with his maturity, skating skill, and shooting abilities. Although Wisconsin finished last in the Big Ten Conference that year with an 8–19–8 record, Kunin led the team with 18 goals and 33 points. He said afterwards that he believed he developed his skills significantly that season, particularly his 200-foot game, by playing regularly against older students at the collegiate level. At the end of the year, he was the only member of the Badgers named to the 2016 All-Big Ten Freshmen Team. After the season, the Minnesota Wild of the National Hockey League (NHL) selected Kunin in the first round, 15th overall, of the 2016 NHL entry draft, and he decided that he would spend one more year with the Badgers before transitioning to professional hockey.

Leading into the 2016–17 season, Kunin was named captain of the Badgers, becoming the first sophomore to earn the title since Mike Eaves during the 1975–76 season. Knowing that Kunin planned on leaving Wisconsin after the season, Badgers head coach Tony Granato spent the year preparing Kunin for the higher level of play that the NHL would require, turning him into a respectable two-way player. He received two Big Ten Second Star of the Week awards that season: first on November 1 after scoring five points in a weekend series against the St. Lawrence Saints and Clarkson Golden Knights, respectively, and later on December 13 for scoring two goals in a 7–4 win over the Michigan Wolverines. The Badgers came within one game of reaching the NCAA postseason, losing to Penn State in double overtime of the Big Ten Conference championship game. Kunin once again led all Badgers in scoring with 22 goals and 38 points, netting him an All-Big Ten Second Team placement, while Wisconsin won 12 more games that season than the last. Despite losing the Big Ten tournament, Kunin was still named to the 2017 Big Ten All-Tournament Team at forward, the only Badger selected. The American Hockey Coaches Association also named Kunin a Division I Second Team All-American for the West Region.

=== Professional ===
==== Minnesota Wild (2017–2020) ====
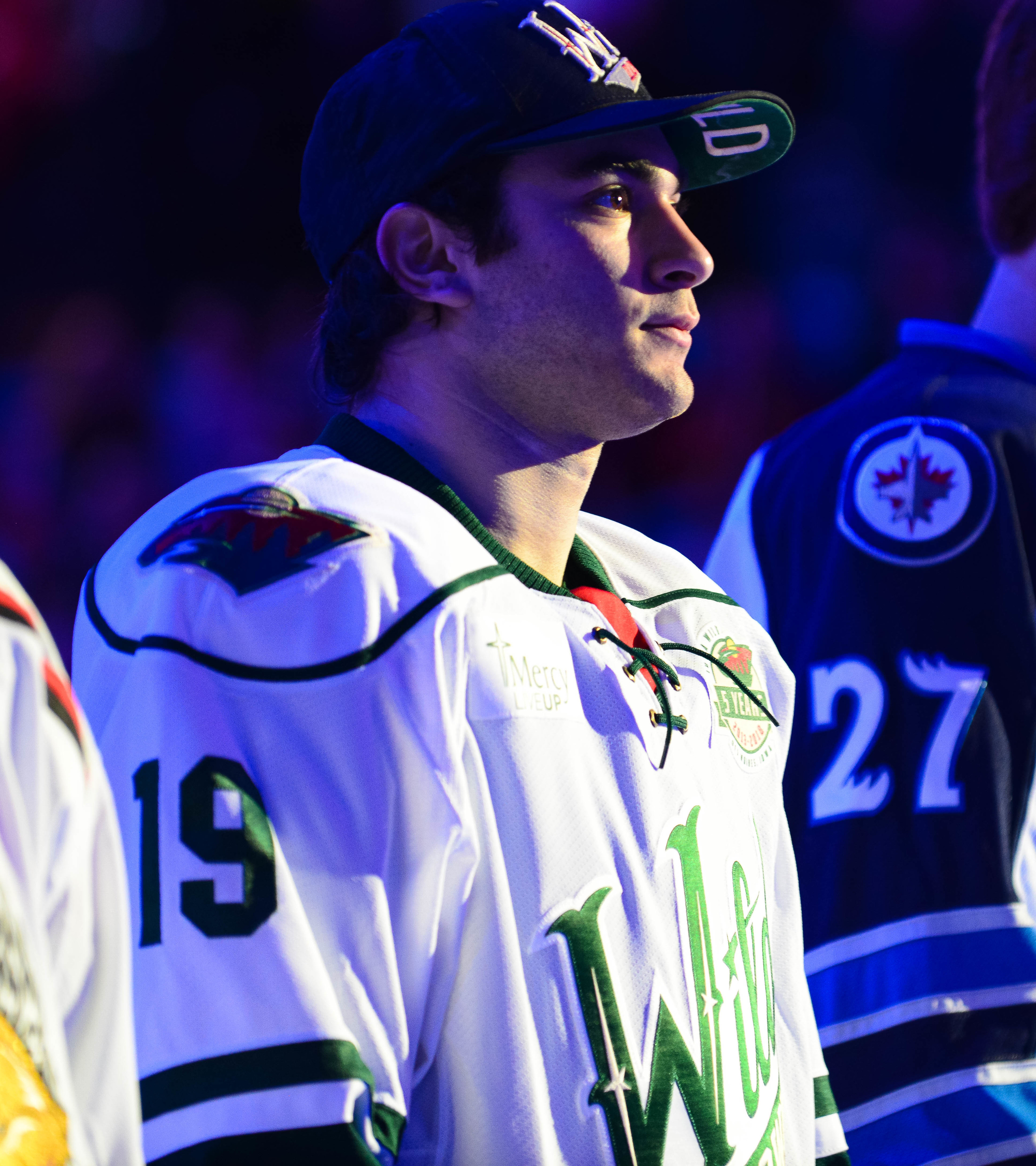
Kunin with the Iowa Wild at the 2018 AHL All-Star Classic

On March 23, 2017, Kunin agreed to a three-year, entry-level contract with the Wild. The contract would be enacted in full for the 2017–18 season, and he would play with the Iowa Wild, Minnesota's American Hockey League (AHL) affiliate, for the remainder of their 2016–17 season on an amateur tryout contract. He played in 12 games for Iowa to close out their season, putting up five goals and three assists in the process.

Kunin was one of the last players cut from the Wild roster before the 2017–18 season, his place in the lineup effectively taken by free agent signing Matt Cullen. When a number of injuries befell the Wild roster, however, Kunin made his NHL debut on short notice, skating in less than 14 minutes of the home opener against the Columbus Blue Jackets before he was sent back down to save space on the team's salary cap. During another brief recall on October 27, Kunin became the first player in franchise history to make his debut NHL goal short-handed. Zack Mitchell also scored his first NHL goal, the game-winner, during the same match, after telling Kunin before the game, "Let's both get our first, but I'll let you go first." Still primarily an AHL player, Kunin was selected for the 2018 AHL All-Star Classic as the only representative from Iowa. Kunin was once again called up to Minnesota on February 27 in order to give the team more energy as they finished out the season, but on March 4, during a game against the Detroit Red Wings, he suffered a season-ending anterior cruciate ligament injury in his right knee. At the time, Kunin had played in 19 NHL games for the season, scoring two goals and two assists in the process. He also played in 36 AHL games, with 10 goals and 19 points there. He underwent surgery for the injury at the beginning of April, with an estimated recovery time of six to seven months.

Kunin was medically cleared to begin playing hockey again on October 8, 2018, and was assigned to Iowa to continue his recovery and spend more time on the ice before rejoining the NHL for the 2018–19 season. He spent the next few months moving up and down between the NHL and AHL. His first recall was on December 9, filling in for an injured Mikko Koivu. He was meant to return to Iowa a week later, but an injury to Matt Dumba forced coach Bruce Boudreau to rearrange his offensive lines, and Kunin remained in Minnesota skating alongside Koivu and Jason Zucker. He was briefly sent back down to Iowa at the end of January to play in two AHL games while Minnesota had an eight-day break, and he was recalled to the NHL on February 4. His point production was minimal during this final stretch, with only one goal and two assists in his last 18 NHL games of the season, but Kunin was given a gradually larger role for Minnesota in the hopes that he would become a staple of their lineup the following season.

When Minnesota's season came to an end on April 9, Kunin was one of a handful of skaters sent back to Iowa to help them during their run for the Calder Cup. In his 49 games with Minnesota, Kunin scored six goals and 17 points while recording 27 penalty minutes. He also had nine goals and 16 points in 25 regular-season AHL games. Kunin appeared in 11 playoff games, scoring six goals and eight points, before the Iowa Wild were eliminated by the Chicago Wolves.

After a difficult start to the 2019–20 season, the Wild found a stable, productive line by mid-November in Kunin, Jordan Greenway, and Joel Eriksson Ek, affectionately referred to as the "GEEK Squad". Primarily a checking line, Greenway and Eriksson Ek served as physical players tasked with preventing the opposing team from scoring, while also leaving Kunin open to score for Minnesota. By the time that the COVID-19 pandemic forced the NHL to suspend the 2019–20 season in March, Kunin had scored 15 goals and 16 assists in 63 games. The Wild had clinched a spot in the 2020 Stanley Cup playoffs, with Kunin invited to participate, but he was initially hesitant to break quarantine, as his diabetes diagnosis placed him at higher risk of suffering complications from the virus. Kunin ultimately joined the team in Edmonton for a best-of-five qualifying series against the Vancouver Canucks. Despite two goals from Kunin, the Canucks won the series in four games.

==== Nashville Predators (2020–2022) ====
On October 7, 2020, the Wild traded Kunin and the 101st overall pick in the 2020 NHL entry draft to the Nashville Predators in exchange for skater Nick Bonino and two 2020 draft picks: No. 37 and No. 70 overall. As a restricted free agent Kunin did not practice with his new team until he and the Predators had agreed to a contract extension eventually signing a two-year, $4.6 million contract with the team on January 6, 2021. Kunin's 2020–21 season started with two lower body injuries: the first sidelined him for four games at the start of February, while a more serious injury had him placed on the injured reserve on March 2. He returned to the lineup on March 27, picking up two assists in a 3–1 defeat of the Chicago Blackhawks. His return was accompanied by a hot streak, with Kunin scoring at least one point in five of his first six games back from injury, and the Predators went 14–6–1 during games he played. He also scored six goals in the last nine games of the regular season, including two in the Predators' 3–1 defeat of the Carolina Hurricanes on May 8, which allowed Nashville to clinch a berth in the 2021 Stanley Cup playoffs. The Predators faced the Hurricanes once again in the first round of playoffs, with Kunin scoring both the first and final goals in Game 4 to keep Nashville in the playoffs. Kunin's first goal came only 57 seconds into the game, while the game-winner came in double overtime. The Predators would lose the series, however, in overtime of Game 6. Kunin played in 38 games of the pandemic-shortened 2020–21 season for Nashville, scoring 10 goals and 19 points in the process.

Kunin started the 2021–22 season on a line with Mikael Granlund and Eeli Tolvanen; he had spent the previous season with Granlund, while Tolvanen replaced the departed Calle Järnkrok. On December 4, 2021, Kunin's 24th birthday, he recorded a Gordie Howe hat trick, the first for Nashville since Ryan Johansen three years prior, en route to a 4–3 overtime win against the Montreal Canadiens. By the midway point of the season, Kunin was one of only three Predators to dress for every game, contributing eight goals and 16 points in the process. His 2021–22 season was an overall disappointment – despite playing all 82 regular-season games, he contributed only 13 goals and 22 points, while his 99 penalty minutes were the third-highest on the team. The Colorado Avalanche swept the Predators in the first round of the 2022 Stanley Cup playoffs, with Kunin recording one assist in the four-game series.

==== San Jose Sharks (2022–2025) ====
A restricted free agent after the 2021–22 season, Kunin was traded to the San Jose Sharks on July 8, 2022. In exchange, Nashville received forward John Leonard and a third-round pick in the 2023 NHL entry draft. Ten days later, Kunin agreed to a two-year, $5.5 million contract with San Jose. He joined his new team for the 2022–23 season on a bottom-six line with Nick Bonino and Noah Gregor. Early in the first period of the Sharks' December 13 game against the Arizona Coyotes, Kunin left the ice following an awkward hit on Patrik Nemeth. The following week, the team announced that Kunin had suffered a season-ending anterior cruciate ligament injury on the play. In 31 games before the tear, he had five goals and 13 points.

The Sharks underwent major roster changes prior to the 2023–24 season, with Kunin one of only three top-nine forwards on the Opening Night roster who had played in San Jose the season prior. Early in the season, he found chemistry with linemates Ryan Carpenter and Givani Smith, the trio combining for a six-point night against the St. Louis Blues on November 16. After the NHL trade deadline, which saw Tomáš Hertl go to the Vegas Golden Knights, Kunin took a larger leadership role on and off the ice. He was promoted to the second line, and general manager Mike Grier saw Kunin as part of a veteran leadership group who would help guide younger players in the organization. Appearing in 77 games during the season, Kunin finished the year with 11 goals and 18 points, while his 165 hits led all Sharks forwards. Kunin served as an alternate captain for part of the season, first taking the role on February 15, when Hertl and captain Logan Couture were both out of the lineup. Kunin was the Sharks' nominee for the 2024 King Clancy Memorial Trophy for his work with Breakthrough T1D.

A restricted free agent at the end of the 2023–24 season, Kunin signed a one-year, $2.75 million contract to stay with the Sharks on June 30, 2024. While announcing the signing, Grier praised Kunin as a player who "helps drive the culture" and served as "a good example for our young players". Going into the 2024–25 season, he was named an alternate captain for Sharks road games.

==== Columbus Blue Jackets (2025) ====
On March 7, 2025, the Sharks traded Kunin to the Columbus Blue Jackets, who were making a push for the playoffs, for a fourth-round pick in the 2025 NHL entry draft. Ultimately, the Blue Jackets would not qualify for the post-season as the final team to miss the playoffs, and Kunin would go scoreless in his time with the club before becoming an unrestricted free agent at the conclusion of the season.

==== Florida Panthers (2025–present) ====
As a free agent following his brief stint with the Blue Jackets, Kunin was belatedly signed to a one-year, $775,000 contract with defending champions, the Florida Panthers, on August 22, 2025.

== International play ==
Medal record

Ice hockey

Representing United States

IIHF World Junior Championship
| Gold medal – first place | 2017 Canada | |

IIHF World U18 Championship
| Gold medal – first place | 2015 Switzerland | |

World U-17 Hockey Challenge
| Gold medal – first place | 2014 Canada | |

Kunin has represented the United States internationally at a number of ice hockey competitions, beginning with the World U-17 Hockey Challenge in 2014. Serving as an alternate captain for the gold medal-winning team, Kunin scored two goals and recorded six points en route to the championships. The following year, he scored six goals and served as captain for the United States for another gold medal performance, this time at the 2015 IIHF World U18 Championships. He was passed over for the United States junior team at the 2016 IIHF World Junior Championship, but made the team the following year. Serving as the captain once more, Kunin took the team to his third consecutive international gold medal, becoming the third Badger to captain a World Juniors team to a championship, following Derek Stepan and Jake McCabe.

Kunin made his senior international debut at the 2019 IIHF World Championship in Slovakia, playing on a line alongside fellow NHL skaters Luke Glendening of the Detroit Red Wings and Frank Vatrano of the Florida Panthers. The United States failed to medal in the tournament, finishing in seventh place overall. Kunin played in three tournament games without registering a point. He returned to the senior national team for the 2024 IIHF World Championship in Czechia. Kunin had one goal and three points in eight tournament games, as Team USA finished in fifth place.

== Personal life ==
Kunin has Type 1 diabetes, which requires frequent management, particularly before games. In addition to checking his blood sugar level multiple times per day, Kunin takes shots of insulin before games, and will occasionally replenish his blood sugar with sips of Gatorade mid-game. Off the ice, he has done charity work with organizations that research juvenile diabetes. In 2021, he established the Luke Kunin T1D fund, which raises money for the Juvenile Diabetes Research Foundation.

Kunin is of Jewish heritage. Kunin met his wife, former Professional Women's Hockey League (PWHL) player Sophia Shaver, while they were both playing college ice hockey at the University of Wisconsin. The couple married in 2023. Several of Kunin and Shaver's friends and former teammates attended the wedding, including Abby Roque, Brady and Matthew Tkachuk, and Marcus Foligno. During the COVID-19 pandemic lockdowns, they adopted a French Bulldog named Rocco.

== Career statistics ==
=== Regular season and playoffs ===
| | | | Regular season | | | | | Playoffs |
| Season | Team | League | GP | G | A | Pts | PIM | GP | G | A | Pts | PIM |
|---|---|---|---|---|---|---|---|---|---|---|---|---|
| 2013–14 | U.S. National Development Team | USHL | 32 | 11 | 12 | 23 | 27 | — | — | — | — | — |
| 2014–15 | U.S. National Development Team | USHL | 20 | 10 | 4 | 14 | 12 | — | — | — | — | — |
| 2015–16 | University of Wisconsin | B1G | 34 | 19 | 13 | 32 | 34 | — | — | — | — | — |
| 2016–17 | University of Wisconsin | B1G | 35 | 22 | 16 | 38 | 30 | — | — | — | — | — |
| 2016–17 | Iowa Wild | AHL | 12 | 5 | 3 | 8 | 16 | — | — | — | — | — |
| 2017–18 | Iowa Wild | AHL | 36 | 10 | 9 | 19 | 34 | — | — | — | — | — |
| 2017–18 | Minnesota Wild | NHL | 19 | 2 | 2 | 4 | 13 | — | — | — | — | — |
| 2018–19 | Iowa Wild | AHL | 28 | 12 | 8 | 20 | 30 | 11 | 6 | 2 | 8 | 18 |
| 2018–19 | Minnesota Wild | NHL | 49 | 6 | 11 | 17 | 27 | — | — | — | — | — |
| 2019–20 | Minnesota Wild | NHL | 63 | 15 | 16 | 31 | 55 | 4 | 2 | 0 | 2 | 2 |
| 2020–21 | Nashville Predators | NHL | 38 | 10 | 9 | 19 | 13 | 6 | 2 | 0 | 2 | 2 |
| 2021–22 | Nashville Predators | NHL | 82 | 13 | 9 | 22 | 99 | 4 | 0 | 1 | 1 | 4 |
| 2022–23 | San Jose Sharks | NHL | 31 | 5 | 8 | 13 | 42 | — | — | — | — | — |
| 2023–24 | San Jose Sharks | NHL | 77 | 11 | 7 | 18 | 83 | — | — | — | — | — |
| 2024–25 | San Jose Sharks | NHL | 63 | 11 | 7 | 18 | 46 | — | — | — | — | — |
| 2024–25 | Columbus Blue Jackets | NHL | 12 | 0 | 0 | 0 | 9 | — | — | — | — | — |
| 2025–26 | Florida Panthers | NHL | 62 | 4 | 6 | 10 | 47 | — | — | — | — | — |
| 2025–26 | Charlotte Checkers | AHL | 1 | 0 | 2 | 2 | 0 | — | — | — | — | — |
| NHL totals | | | 496 | 77 | 75 | 152 | 434 | 14 | 4 | 1 | 5 | 8 |

=== International ===
| Year | Team | Event | Result | GP | G | A | Pts | PIM |
|---|---|---|---|---|---|---|---|---|
| 2014 | United States | U17 | 1st place, gold medalist(s) | 6 | 2 | 4 | 6 | 0 |
| 2015 | United States | U18 | 1st place, gold medalist(s) | 7 | 6 | 0 | 6 | 2 |
| 2017 | United States | WJC | 1st place, gold medalist(s) | 7 | 2 | 2 | 4 | 25 |
| 2019 | United States | WC | 7th | 3 | 0 | 0 | 0 | 0 |
| 2024 | United States | WC | 5th | 8 | 1 | 2 | 3 | 4 |
| Junior totals | | | | 20 | 10 | 6 | 16 | 27 |
| Senior totals | | | | 11 | 1 | 2 | 3 | 4 |

== Awards and honors ==
| Award | Year |
College
| All-Big Ten Freshman Team | 2016 |
| All-Big Ten Second Team | 2017 |
| Big Ten All-Tournament Team | 2017 |
| AHCA West Second-Team All-American | 2017 |
AHL
| AHL All-Star Game | 2018 |

== See also ==
- List of select Jewish ice hockey players

Awards and achievements
| Preceded by Joel Eriksson Ek | Minnesota Wild first-round draft pick 2016 | Succeeded by Filip Johansson |
