= Hunter hills =

Hunter(s)hill(s), Hunter(s)-Hill(s), and variations, may refer to:

== People ==
- Hunter Hill (baseball) (1879–1959), American baseball player
- Hunter Hill (politician) (born 1977), American politician
- Callum Hunter-Hill (born 1997), British rugby player

== Places ==
- Hunterhill, former name of North Sydney, New South Wales, Australia
- Hunters Hill, New South Wales, Australia; a suburb of Northern Sydney
- Municipality of Hunter's Hill, Lower North Shore, Sydney, New South Wales, Australia
- Parish of Hunters Hill, Cumberland County, New South Wales, Australia
- Hunter Hill Estates, Alberta, Canada; a locality in Strathcona County
- Hunters Hills, South Canterbury, South Island, New Zealand; a range of hills
- Hunters Hill, Randburg, Gauteng, South Africa; a neighbourhood
- Hunterhill, Renfrewshire, Scotland, UK; a neighbourhood
- Hunter's Hill, Angus Scotland, UK; a hill, see Hunter's Hill Stone
- Hunter Hills, Atlanta, Georgia, USA; a neighborhood
- Hunter's Hill (Tennessee), USA; a plantation owned by Andrew Jackson

== Other uses ==
- Hunters Hill High School, Hunters Hill, NSW, Australia
- Hunters Hill Rugby Club, Hunters Hill, NSW, Australia
- Hunters Hill Observatory, Ngunnawal, ACT, Australia; see List of observatory codes
- Hunter Hills Elementary School, Laurel County Public Schools, Laurel County, Kentucky, USA

== See also ==
- James Hill Hunter (1839–1891), Canadian politician
- Hunter Peak (Colorado), USA; a mountain
- Hunter Peak (Texas), USA; a mountain
- Mount Hunter (disambiguation)
- Hunter Mountain (disambiguation)
