= Jeff Cacciatore =

American soccer player (born 1958)

Personal information
- Date of birth: September 5, 1958 (age 68)
- Place of birth: St. Louis, Missouri, United States
- Height: 5 ft 4 in (1.63 m)
- Position: Forward

Youth career
- 1976–1979: SIU Edwardsville Cougars

Senior career*
Years	Team	Apps	(Gls)
1980	Fort Lauderdale Strikers	15	(1)
1979–1981	Fort Lauderdale Strikers (indoor)	24	(8)
1981–1987	St. Louis Steamers (indoor)	228	(85)
Total		267	(94)
- * Club domestic league appearances and goals

Jeff Cacciatore is an American retired soccer forward who played professionally in the North American Soccer League and the Major Indoor Soccer League. Cacciatore was elected into the Saint Louis Soccer Hall of Fame in 2013.

== Youth ==
In 1976, Cacciatore, younger brother of Steve Cacciatore, graduated from St. Louis University High School. He attended Southern Illinois University Edwardsville, playing on the men's soccer team from 1976 to 1979. In his last season, the team won the 1979 NCAA Men's Division I Soccer Championship. On October 24, 2009, SIUE inducted Cacciatore into the school's Athletic Hall of Fame.

== Professional ==
In the fall of 1979, Cacciatore signed with the Fort Lauderdale Strikers of the North American Soccer League. He played two indoor and one outdoor season with the Strikers. He was a member of the 1980 Soccer Bowl runner-up Strikers team that fell to the New York Cosmos 3–0 in the final.

He then moved to the St. Louis Steamers of the Major Indoor Soccer League in the fall of 1981. He played six season before being released and retiring in 1987.

Cacciatore coaches the Whitfield School girls' soccer team and all levels of boys. Cacciatore also teaches at Whitfield School, where he's taught science for Eight Graders since 1991.
