= Hunters Mountain, Nova Scotia =

Community in Nova Scotia, Canada

Coordinates: 46°6′33.92″N 60°51′41.44″W

Hunters Mountain in Nova Scotia

Hunters Mountain is a small community in the Canadian province of Nova Scotia, located in Victoria County on Cape Breton Island. This mountain is named after an early settler, John Hunter.
