= Winter Break: Hunter Mountain =

American reality TV show

- Genre: Reality television
- Starring: Taylar Shinn; Jeffrey Brewer; Carissa Witham; Jillian Metz; Alex Shinder; Alessandra Camerlingo; Marc Vindas; Taylor James
- Country of origin: United States
- Original language: English
- No. of seasons: 1
- No. of episodes: 8

Production
- Camera setup: Multiple
- Running time: 41–48 minutes

Original release
- Network: MTV; MTV2
- Release: February 27 – March 31, 2018

Winter Break: Hunter Mountain is an American reality television series that premiered on MTV on February 27, 2018. 2 episodes were shown before moving to MTV2. One episode premiered on MTV2 before the channel marathoned the remaining episodes.

== Cast ==
=== Main ===
- Taylar Shinn
- Jeffrey Brewer
- Carissa Witham
- Jillian Metz
- Alex Shinder
- Alessandra Camerlingo
- Marc Vindas
- Taylor James

== Episodes ==
No.	Title	Original release date	US viewers (millions)
1	"The First Night"	February 27, 2018	0.18
2	"How Jill Got Her Groove Back"	March 6, 2018	N/A
3	"It's Complicated"	March 23, 2018	N/A
4	"The Letter"	March 31, 2018	N/A
5	"The Phone Call"	March 31, 2018	N/A
6	"The Good the Bad and the Ugly"	March 31, 2018	N/A
7	"Fear and Loathing on Hunter Mountain"	March 31, 2018	N/A
8	"The Last Night"	March 31, 2018	N/A
