= Huntsman (chemical plant) =

Chemical manufacturing plant in Australia

Huntsman Chemical Company of Australia Pty Ltd (HCCA) operated a complex chemical manufacturing plant in Somerville Rd Brooklyn in Melbourne. The site is 35 hectares in size and is located in the City of Brimbank. HCCA was partially owned by the Huntsman Corporation.

== History ==
The site was established in 1941 during World War II to manufacture aspirin and sulfa drugs. For most of its life the site has been owned and operated by the Monsanto Company Corporation. In 1988 Monsanto sold all of its Australian non-agricultural operations to Consolidated Press Holdings and Chemplex Australia Ltd was created. In 1993 Consolidated Press Holdings and Huntsman Chemical Corporation established the present joint venture partnership i.e. Huntsman Chemical Company of Australia Pty Ltd. The plant was shut down in December 2009 with the polyester business sold to Nuplex. Plant buildings and manufacturing facilities were demolished in 2011. Pelligra purchased the vacated plant site in 2018 to build a business park.

== Styrene Monomer ==
Styrene is produced in a continuous plant that was commissioned in 1977. The Styrene Plant consists of 7 units

=== Tank Farm ===
This is located at the west end of the site near Market Rd. These tanks are used to store for raw materials for the other units of the Styrene Plant. The company purchases amination grade benzene and also a material called BTX. Both are liquids. BTX stands for Benzene, Toluene, and Xylene. BTX is a mixture of these chemical species plus many other species. Both liquids are stored in large steel tanks surrounded by concrete bunds. The tanks vent to a pair of carbon beds that collect most of the gaseous discharge from the tanks. When road tankers unload liquid benzene or BTX into the respective tanks, vapour rich in these materials is discharged from the tank vent and is trapped in activated carbon beds. Benzene and BTX are purchased overseas and is transported to nearby Coode Island where it is unloaded from ships and stored in a similar tank farm before being transported by road to the West Footscray site. The tank farm also contains similar tanks that contain the finished product styrene monomer and various intermediate liquids. See descriptions of these materials in the other sections below.

=== Ethylene ===
The ethylene plant produces ethylene (also known as ethene) from ethane. Ethylene and ethane are both gases. The ethane flows to the plant via a pipeline ultimately from Bass Strait oil and gas wells. The ethylene is produced by steam cracking. In this process, gaseous ethane briefly heated to 750–950 °C in a thermal cracker. The cracker is a large box with many gas burners and long sections of pipe inside. The ethane flows inside the pipe and is partially converted to ethylene and hydrogen. The reaction is moderated or improved by the addition of hydrogen sulfide. This material is usually supplied from the Litol plant or if this plant is not running dimethyl disulfide (DMDS) is used. The rest of the plant is principally involved with purifying and compressing this gas stream to a concentration suitable for the Alkylation plant. A four-stage compression plant is used to purify the ethylene. The gas mixture is washed with water and caustic to remove acid gas and sulfides. Ethylene is produced by cryogenic separation. The ethylene product of this plant is not stored but piped directly to the Alkylation plant where it is consumed. If the Alkylation plant cannot accept the ethylene, the gas is sent to the flare.

One product of this cryogenic separation is a hydrogen rich stream that is used in the Litol plant. Propylene is used as the refrigerant in the cryogenic distillation section of the plant.

=== Litol ===
BTX is purified in this plant into amination grade benzene. The major chemical process in this plant is dealkylation which is really the opposite of that occurring in the Alkylation plant (see section below). Toluene is also called methyl benzene. In this plant toluene is converted into benzene and methane. The xylene ( a group of three dimethyl benzenes) in the BTX are similarly converted to benzene and methane. This requires hydrogen which is supplied in a gaseous stream from the Ethylene plant (see above). The reaction is completed in a pair of reactors in series at high temperature and high pressure. The methane and other gaseous products are separated from the benzene and the other liquids. The mixture of benzene, xylenes etc. is then purified in two distillation columns. The benzene is then stored in the tank farm before use a raw material in the Alkylation Plant.

=== Alkylation ===
In this plant the gaseous ethylene and the liquid benzene are combined with the aim of making ethylbenzene. Alkylation is a basic chemical process where an alkyl group is added to another molecule. This plant uses a variation on the Friedel-Crafts reaction. Aluminium chloride is used to make a complex with polyethylbenzene. This complex is then circulated as the catalyst for the reaction. The reaction takes place in a chemical reactor. The products of this plant contains a mixture of benzene, ethylbenzene, and smaller quantities of a few polyethylbenzes. This mixture is sent to the Alkylation Distillation plant via storage in the tank farm.

=== Alkylation Distillation ===
This plant consists of four distillation columns. Three of the columns in this section have their own direct fired reboilers. The benzene drying column has a conventional steam heated reboiler. This plant produces a pure stream of ethylbenzene that is used in the dehydrogenation plant.

=== Dehydrogenation ===
The main reaction in this plant is the conversion of ethylbenzene to styrene. It is a dehydrogenation reaction because two hydrogen atoms are removed from ethylbenzene to give styrene. The reaction is endothermic. The heat to drive this reaction is provided by steam. The reaction takes place in a large single fixed bed catalytic reactor.

=== Dehydrogenation Distillation ===
Styrene is separated from ethyl benzene in a very tall continuously packed distillation tower. This separation is difficult because of the close boiling points of ethylbenzene and styrene; 136 degrees C and 145 degrees C respectively. This column is the tallest distillation column in Australia. The ethylbenzene coming out of the column is recycled to the Alkylation plant. To prevent the self polymerization of the styrene at the temperatures in the column an inhibitor is added to the mixture of ethylbenzene and styrene before it enters the column. There are two other distillation columns in this plant. All three operate under vacuum. Pure styrene is transferred to the tank farm. Styrene is a clear colourless liquid with a sickly sweet odour.

=== Styrene Plant Utilities ===
The plant has the following utilities:

- Cooling tower. Cooling water is circulated throughout the plant. It is mainly used in the overhead condenser of the distillation columns and vent scrubbers. The water is cooled in a large conventional air cooling tower. The water is treated to prevent the buildup of algae etc. in the water.
- Fire Water tanks, pumps and sprinkler system. There are several high capacity pumps connected to a dedicated pair of fire water tanks. Some of the pumps have diesel powered motors since electrical power ( as used in conventional pumps) may be lost in a fire.
- Flare-The gas flare has continuous flame generation and steam injection to improve combustion.
- Control Room. This is a centrally located room where the plant operators monitor the state of the plant.
- H_{2}S incinerator where the process of incineration is used to convert waste hydrogen sulfide gas into sulfur dioxide.
- The styrene plant consumes steam supplied by the nearby boiler house. The boiler house provides 4 different grades of steam i.e. different pressures and different amounts of superheat. Most of the steam is used to heat the reboilers in the distillation columns.
- There is also a condensate header to collect the condensed steam and return it to the boiler house.

== Other Plants ==
- Continuous Polystyrene
- Expandable Polystyrene
- Fibreglass Resins

In January 2007, Huntsman announced the completion of the sale of this business including its gelcoat and vinylesters business to Nuplex Industries Ltd (Nuplex) for $US7.5 million plus the value of stock on hand.

- Utilities

To support the operating units the site has a boiler house, laboratories, maintenance workshops, warehouses an effluent treatment plant and offices.

== Shutdown Units ==
Since the early 1980s several of the operating units have been shut down for various reasons. Shut down units are listed below.

- Cumene-Phenol Plant
- Salicylic Acid
- Aspirin
- Styrene Butadiene Latexes
- Polystyrene Extrusion
- Santoflex
- Flopak

== Cumene-Phenol Plant ==
This continuous plant was started up in 1968 when it was the Royal Australian Chemical Institute "Plant of the Year". It shut down and dismantled in 2005. The Cumene-Phenol plant was the third plant to produce phenol on the West Footscray site. The site has been completely dismantled except for the old control room.

It is called the Cumene-Phenol plant because of the intermediate materials is cumene or isopropylbenzene in the cumene process. It produces equimolar amounts of phenol and acetone. It was the only Cumene-Phenol plant built in Australia. Some cumene-hydroperoxide an organic peroxide was also sold.

There are 7 units in this plant

=== Cumene ===
The two main raw materials in this process are benzene and propylene. Benzene is a liquid that was purchased overseas and stored on the site in one tank. In 1996 this plant was decommissioned when all benzene on site was stored in the Styrene Plant tank farm. Propylene is a gas and was supplied to the site from Mobil Refinery Altona which is about 7 km away by truck. Propylene was stored in one high pressure tank. These two material were reacted in an alkylation reaction. The reaction took place in fixed bed catalytic reactor. The catalyst was a mixture of phosphoric acid on a clay base. The reactor produced a mixture of cumene, propylene and benzene. These materials were separated in two distillation columns; the depropaniser and the benzene column. There were two tanks that could be used to store cumene before it was sent to Oxidation.

=== Oxidation ===
This section of the plant converts cumene into a mixture of cumene hydroperoxide and cumene. The reaction took place in four reactors. Each reactor was supplied with air from one large positive displacement compressor. The four reactors operated in series. The fourth oxidizer was a later addition to the plant in approximately 1981. Each oxider was run at a carefully controlled temperature, pressure and level of residual oxygen to optimize the production of the hydroperoxide. This section of the plant produced a large volume of residual air that contained small amounts of cumene; a highly odorous material. Carbon beds were installed to remove the cumene from this stream in the 1980s.

=== Stripping ===
The cumene hydroperoxide (CHP) is concentrated in this section. The rich stream of CHP is not stored due to its high instability at this concentration, but sent straight to the cleavage section.

=== Cleavage ===
A small steady stream of sulfuric acid is added to catalyse the cleavage reaction. In this reaction the CHP splits open and rearranges itself into two molecules; one each of phenol and acetone. Since the reaction is very unstable the Cleavage Reactor operated under strict temperature and acidity control with a high level of acetone reflux. The reactor was also equipped with emergency firewater injection.

=== Distillation ===
The mixture from the cleavage reactor was flash distilled in the Evaporator. This removed most of the acetone and phenol from a heavy tar material. The rest of the plant consists of several conventional distillation columns that produced a pure stream of phenol, one of acetone, a heavy oil stream and crude alpha methyl styrene (a byproduct). The crude alpha methyl styrene was purified by a batch distillation process. This used a conventional steam fired reboiler distillation column in the previous or Scientific Design (SD) Phenol Plant.

=== Tank farm ===
The tank farm had tanks for benzene, cumene, phenol ( pure and an 88% solution of phenol in water), alpha-methylstyrene and heavy ends tar. The phenol tanks had steam coils to keep the phenol liquid. Phenol melts at 45 degrees.

=== Utilities ===
The plant consumes steam supplied by the boiler house. The phenol plant had three levels of steam and condensate collection that returned the hot steam condensate to the boiler house. The heavy ends tar was sent to the boiler house as a supplement to the natural gas fuel used in boiler number 4. The sulphuric acid used as a catalyst in the cleavage reactor left the process via the heavy ends. The sulfate in this tar stream gave a blue tinge to the otherwise clear plume from number four boiler house stack. There was also a gas flare to burn the by product propane. This material was an impurity in the propylene. Normally it was condensed, stored in high pressure tanks and sold. Waste water was collected and treated at the site effluent treatment plant before being discharged into sewer.

== See also ==
- Chemical engineering
- Chemistry
