= Meander Dam =

Dam and hydro-power station in Tasmania

- Location of the dam in Tasmania
- Interactive map of Meander Dam
- Country: Australia
- Location: Northern Tasmania
- Coordinates: 41°41′30″S 146°37′14″E
- Purpose: Irrigation; Power
- Status: Operational
- Opening date: November 2007
- Construction cost: A$24 million
- Built by: Macmahons
- Owner: Tasmanian Irrigation (TI) Pty Ltd

Dam and spillways
- Type of dam: Gravity dam
- Impounds: Meander River
- Height: 50 m (160 ft)
- Length: 186 m (610 ft)
- Elevation at crest: 402 m (1,319 ft) AHD
- Dam volume: 85×10^{3} m^{3} (3.0×10^{6} cu ft)
- Spillways: 1
- Spillway type: Uncontrolled centrally located conventional spillway

Reservoir
- Creates: Lake Huntsman
- Total capacity: 43,000 ML (35,000 acre⋅ft)
- Active capacity: 36,000 ML (29,000 acre⋅ft)
- Catchment area: 163 km^{2} (63 sq mi)
- Surface area: 45.3 ha (112 acres)
- Normal elevation: 378 m (1,240 ft) AHD

Huntsman Lake Power Station
- Operator: Tyco Tamar
- Commission date: February 2008
- Type: Conventional
- Hydraulic head: 42 m (138 ft)
- Turbines: 1 x 1.95 MW (2,610 hp) double-Francis-type
- Installed capacity: 1.95 MW (2,610 hp)

The Meander Dam is a concrete gravity dam across the Upper Meander River, located in northern Tasmania, Australia. The impounded reservoir is called Lake Huntsman.

The dam was constructed in 2006 by the Tasmanian Rivers & Water Supply Commission for the principal purpose of delivering a reliable supply of irrigation water to the Meander Valley, estimated at 44,200 hectares (109,000 acres). Adjacent to the dam is the Huntsman Lake Power Station, a small conventional hydroelectric power station, operated by Tyco Tamar.

== Dam and reservoir overview ==
=== Background ===
Proposals to build a dam on the Meander River below Warners Creek date from at least 1968. The site was cleared in preparation for dam construction during the last 1980s. In 1995 a report by engineering consultants, GHD Group, stated that the lack of a reliable water supply for irrigation in the Meander catchment area was seen as a key factor limiting potential future expansion of agricultural enterprises. The pressure on water resources in the Meander catchment resulted in the need to limit and sometimes prohibit the extraction of water from the river during the irrigation season. In 2002, a water management plan for the catchment was under development and was expected to address environmental flow concerns through the implementation of higher minimum river flows. It was expected that the increase in minimum flows would result in the need to reduce the irrigation water currently extracted from the river, which would reduce agricultural production and prevent the development of water dependent agricultural enterprises.

However, the dam faced considerable opposition. Despite being passed by two other statutory committees of the Tasmanian Parliament, the Resource Management and Planning Appeal Tribunal knocked it back on economic and environmental grounds. The Tribunal vetoed the construction of the dam because it could not determine its economic value - as estimates ranged from a loss of A$600,000 to nearly A$40 million - and because it would affect two threatened species, the epacris plant and the spotted tail quoll. In September 2003, following intervention by the Australian Government, the project was approved.

=== Dam details ===
Opened in November 2007, the concrete gravity dam wall is 50 metres (160 ft) high and 170 metres (560 ft) long. When full, Lake Huntsman has capacity of 43,000 megalitres (35,000 acre⋅ft) and covers 45.3 hectares (112 acres), drawn from a catchment area of 163 square kilometres (63 sq mi). The single uncontrolled centrally located conventional spillway is 28 metres (92 ft) wide with four off flowgate spillway gates.

Since completing the construction of the Meander Dam a further four pump and pipeline schemes have been built to expand the reach of the water available from the dam and deliver irrigation water to the adjoining farming districts of Caveside-Dairy Plains, Rubicon River, Quamby Brook and Hagley.

In 2008, Irrigation Tasmania installed a 215-metre-long (705 ft) floating safety barrier, to protect recreational users from the hazards of the overflow spillway.

== Hydroelectric power station ==
The Huntsman Lake Power Station has one unique double Francis-type turbine, with a generating capacity of 1.95 megawatts (2,610 hp) of electricity. Water from Lake Huntsman supplies the power station, that was commissioned in February 2008 by Tyco Tamar. Electric power generation is a by-product of water released by the dam to primarily satisfy irrigation purposes.

== See also ==
- List of power stations in Tasmania
- List of reservoirs and dams in Tasmania
