= Le Chasseur =

Chasseur is a French brand of colorful enameled cast iron cookware and trivets. It is manufactured by the Invicta S.A. foundry based in Donchery in the Champagne-Ardenne region of Northern France, which has been manufacturing cast iron products since 1924.

Chasseur cookware can be used on all stovetops including induction.
