= The Hunters =

The Hunters may refer to:

== Film and television ==
- The Hunters (1957 film), an anthropological film directed by Robert Gardner and John Marshall
- The Hunters (1958 film), an adaptation of the James Salter novel, starring Robert Mitchum and Robert Wagner
- The Hunters (1977 film), a Greek film
- The Hunters (1996 film), a Swedish thriller directed by Kjell Sundvall
  - The Hunters 2, a 2011 film, known as False Trail, Swedish sequel to above, also directed by Sundvall
  - The Hunters (TV series), 2018 Swedish continuation inspired by previous films
- The Hunters (2011 film), a French film
- The Hunters (2013 film), an American film

=== Television episodes ===
- "The Hunters", According to Jim, season 1, episode 8 (2004)
- "The Hunters", Attack on Titan season 2, episode 8 ((2017)
- "The Hunters", Banner of the Stars II episode 4 (2001)
- "The Hunters", Chosen season 1, episode 2 (2013)
- "The Hunters", Follow the Sun episode 9 (1961)
- "The Hunters", Highlander: The Series season 1, episode 22 (1993)
- "The Hunters", Kodiak episode 5 (1974)
- "The Hunters", Johnny Ringo episode 5 (1959)
- "The Hunters", Little House on the Prairie season 3, episode 10 (1976)
- "The Hunters", Police Story season 1, episode 17 (1974)
- "The Hunters", Robotech season 2, episode 17 (1985)
- "The Hunters", Run, Joe, Run season 2, episode 13 (1975)
- "The Hunters", The F.B.I. season 7, episode 19 (1972)
- "The Hunters", The Twilight Zone season 3, episode 4 (1988)
- "The Hunters", Whiplash episode 22 (1961)
- "The Hunters", Wings season 1, episode 8 (1977)

== Literature ==
- The Hunters (novel), a 1956 semi-autobiographical novel by James Salter about U.S. Air Force pilots in the Korean War
- The Hunters (2001 book), two novellas by American author Claire Messud
- The Hunters (Brotherband), the third novel in the Brotherband series by John Flanagan
- The Hunters (book series), a series of novels by American author Chris Kuzneski, also the initial novel

== Music ==
- The Hunters (punk rock band), a punk rock band from Quebec, Canada
- The Hunters (instrumental band), a 1960s instrumental band from Cheshunt, Hertfordshire, United Kingdom
- The Hunters, a band name under which Scorpions released their single "Fuchs geh' voran"

== See also ==
- The Hunter (disambiguation)
- Hunters (disambiguation)
- Hunter (disambiguation)
