= Giuseppe Cacciatore =

Italian philosopher and historian of philosophy (1945–2023)

- Born: 2 December 1945; Salerno, Italy
- Died: 6 February 2023 (aged 77); Salerno, Italy
- Other name: Peppino Cacciatore

Giuseppe Cacciatore (2 December 1945 – 2 March 2023) was an Italian philosopher and historian of philosophy. He was professor emeritus of history of philosophy at the University of Naples Federico II.

== Life and career ==
Born in Salerno, Cacciatore graduated in philosophy at the Sapienza University of Rome in 1968, and the same year he became assistant in the faculty of philosophy at the University of Salerno, becoming ordinary professor in 1970. Starting from 1981 he was professor of history of philosophy at the University of Naples Federico II, becoming emeritus in 2017. He also served as president of the class of Moral Sciences of the Accademia Pontaniana between 2017 and 2018, and from 2019 he was a national member of the Accademia dei Lincei.

He was author of a large number of essays and studies, including works about Wilhelm Dilthey, Immanuel Kant, Georg Wilhelm Friedrich Hegel, Giordano Bruno and Benedetto Croce, and collaborated as a columnist with numerous publications.

A member of Italian Communist Party, Cacciatore briefly served as city councillor for the Performing Arts in his hometown under mayor Vincenzo Giordano. He died in Salerno on 2 March 2023, at the age of 77.
