= The Hunt =

The Hunt may refer to:

== Films ==
- AV The Hunt (2020), a Turkish horror thriller
- The Hunt (1966 film), a Spanish film directed by Carlos Saura
- The Hunt (2007 film), an American science-fiction horror about hunters who encounter extraterrestrials
- The Hunt (2012 film), a Danish drama directed by Thomas Vinterberg and starring Mads Mikkelsen
- The Hunt (2016 film), a South Korean action thriller
- The Hunt (2020 film), an American satirical horror thriller

== Television ==
=== Series ===
- The Hunt, 2002 documentary on the University of Chicago Scavenger Hunt
- The Hunt with John Walsh, a 2014 program aimed for apprehending wanted criminals
- The Hunt (2015 TV series), a BBC natural history series presented by David Attenborough
- The Hunt (2026 TV series), English title for French mini series Traqués
- The Hunt: The Rajiv Gandhi Assassination Case, 2026 television series about the assassination of Indian prime minister Rajiv Gandhi
- Hunters (2020 TV series), an American television series originally titled The Hunt
- The Hunting, a 2019 Australian television series originally titled The Hunt

=== Episodes ===
- "The Hunt", African Patrol episode 2 (1958)
- "The Hunt", Baywatch season 10, episode 9 (1999)
- "The Hunt", Bureau of Alien Detectors episode 1 (1997)
- "The Hunt", City of Dreams season 1, episode 4 (2019)
- "The Hunt", Fast & Furious Spy Racers season 3, episode 4 (2020)
- "The Hunt", Fight to Survive episode 5 (2023)
- "The Hunt", Have Gun – Will Travel season 6, episode 21 (1962)
- "The Hunt", Invasion episode 6 (2005)
- "The Hunt", Justified season 6, episode 7 (2015)
- "The Hunt", Kishin Houkou Demonbane episode 9 (2006)
- "The Hunt", Kraft Suspense Theatre season 1, episode 9 (1963)
- "The Hunt", La Brea season 1, episode 3 (2021)
- "The Hunt", Mary & George episode 2 (2024)
- "The Hunt", North of 60 season 3, episode 14 (1995)
- "The Hunt", Playdate season 2, episode 24 (1963)
- "The Hunt", Power Rangers Dino Fury season 2, episode 9 (2022)
- "The Hunt", R.C.M.P. episode 18 (1960)
- "The Hunt", Stargate Universe season 2, episode 16 (2011)
- "The Hunt", Swamp Thing season 1, episode 19 (1991)
- "The Hunt", The Apprentice: ONE Championship Edition episode 3 (2021)
- "The Hunt", The Dead Zone season 2, episode 16 (2003)
- "The Hunt", The Empress episode 4 (2022)
- "The Hunt", The Following season 3, episode 7 (2015)
- "The Hunt", The Karate Kid episode 11 (1989)
- "The Hunt", The Littlest Hobo season 2, episode 9 (1980)
- "The Hunt", The Medicine Line episode 7 (2014)
- "The Hunt", The Outer Limits season 4, episode 2 (1998)
- "The Hunt", The Rookie season 2, episode 20 (2020)
- "The Hunt", The Tall Man season 2, episode 21 (1962)
- "The Hunt", The Twilight Zone season 3, episode 19 (1962)
- "The Hunt", The Waltons, season 1, episode 4 (1972)
- "The Hunt", The Wire season 1, episode 12 (2002)
- "The Hunt", Wapos Bay episode 13 (2007)
- "The Hunt", X Company season 3, episode 7 (2017)
- "The Hunt", Young Justice season 2, episode 17 (2013)

== Music ==
- "The Hunt" ("Jagdquartett"), a nickname for String Quartet No. 17 (Mozart)
- "The Hunt" ("Die Jagd"), a nickname for Beethoven's Piano Sonata No. 18 in E-flat Major, Op. 31 No. 3
- The Hunt (Guv'ner album), 1996
- The Hunt (Dexter Gordon album), 1947
- The Hunt (band), Canadian rock band
- The Hunt (band), NYC post-punk outfit on Sacred Bones Records, 2006–2010

== Literature and theatre ==
- The Hunt: Me and the War Criminals, a 2008 book by Carla Del Ponte
- The Hunt (play), adapted from the 2012 film by David Farr, 2019
- The Hunt, in the Age of Reptiles (comics) comic book series
- The Hunt, a short story from Tales of Pirx the Pilot by Stanisław Lem
- The Hunt (1950s Stanisław Lem short story)

== Other uses ==
- The Hunt (Gleizes), a 1911 painting by Albert Gleizes
- HUNT Study, a cohort health study in Norway
- "The Hunt," colloquialism for Far Hills Races, a horserace in New Jersey, US
- The Hunt, a nickname for an event that took place on the Roblox platform during March 2024 titled “The Hunt: First Edition”

== See also ==
- Hunt (disambiguation)
- Wild Hunt, a motif in European mythology
