= USS Huntress =

USS Huntress may refer to the following ships of the United States Navy:

- USS Huntress (1862), was a stern-wheel steamer purchased by the US Navy in May 1864 and decommissioned 10 August 1865
- USS Huntress (1895), was a steam yacht with schooner rig purchased for the US Navy in June 1898 and sold 3 December 1917
