= Hunter Valley (disambiguation) =

Hunter Valley is the valley of the Hunter River in New South Wales, Australia.

Hunter Valley may also refer to:

- Hunter Valley Coal Chain, a chain of coal delivery
- Hunter Valley Grammar School
- Hunter Valley Important Bird Area
- Hunter Valley Railway Trust, a railway museum
- Hunter Valley Steamfest, a locomotive event
- Hunter Valley wine region
