= Huntsman (surname) =

Huntsman is a surname. Notable people with the surname include:

- The Huntsman business and political family, a prominent family of American Latter-day Saint origin, namesakes of Huntsman Corporation
  - Jon Huntsman Sr. (1937–2018), American businessman and philanthropist; founder and Chairman of Huntsman Corporation
  - Jon Huntsman Jr. (born 1960), American diplomat and politician; Governor of Utah (2005–2009), U.S. ambassador to Singapore (1992–93), China (2009–12), and Russia (2017–19); candidate for the 2012 Republican presidential nomination; son of Jon Sr.
  - Mary Kaye Huntsman (born 1961), American activist; wife of Jon Jr.
  - Peter Huntsman (born 1963), American businessman; CEO of Huntsman Corporation; son of Jon Sr.
  - Abby Huntsman (born 1986), American television personality; daughter of Jon Jr. and Mary Kaye
- Archibald Gowanlock Huntsman (1883–1973), Canadian scientist
- Benjamin Huntsman, 18th-century English inventor
- John A. Huntsman, decorated 19th-century American soldier
- Robert Huntsman (born 1955), American lawyer
