= Hunt (given name) =

Hunt is the given name of:

- Hunt Downer (born 1946), American politician and major general
- Hunt Emerson (born 1952), British cartoonist
- Hunt Hawkins, American poet
- Hunt Sales (born 1954), American rock and roll drummer
- Hunt Slonem (born 1951), American painter, sculptor, and printmaker
- Hunt Stromberg (1894–1968), Hollywood film producer
- Hunt Walsh (1720–1795), British general and Member of the Parliament of Ireland
- Hunt Stockwell, fictional character in the TV series The A-Team, played by Robert Vaughn
