= Onaseuse =

- Location in the Pacific Ocean
- Other names: Hunter Island

Geography
- Location: Pacific Ocean
- Coordinates: 15°31′S 176°11′E

Onaseuse or Hunter Island is a phantom island sighted in 1823 and reported to be northwest of Viti Levu, Fiji.
