= Hunting (surname) =

Hunting is a surname. Notable people with the surname include:

- John Hunting (referee) (1935–2024), English football referee
- John Hunting (settler) (c. 1597–1689), Massachusetts settler
- John R. Hunting (born 1931), American philanthropist
- Tom Hunting (born 1965), American drummer

== Fictional characters ==
- Will Hunting, a character in the film Good Will Hunting
