= Hunter, Ohio =

- CDP
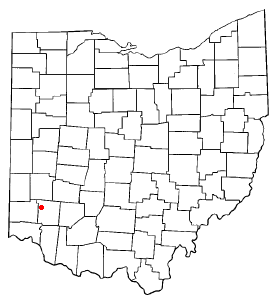
- Location of Hunter, Ohio
- Coordinates: 39°29′46″N 84°17′24″W
- Country: United States
- State: Ohio
- County: Warren

Area
  - Total: 2.16 sq mi (5.60 km^{2})
  - Land: 2.16 sq mi (5.60 km^{2})
  - Water: 0 sq mi (0.00 km^{2})
- Elevation: 896 ft (273 m)

Population (2020)
  - Total: 3,363
  - Density: 1,554.8/sq mi (600.32/km^{2})
- Time zone: UTC-5 (Eastern (EST))
  - Summer (DST): UTC-4 (EDT)
- ZIP code: 45005
- Area codes: 326 and 937
- FIPS code: 39-36806
- GNIS feature ID: 2393060

Hunter is a census-designated place (CDP) in Franklin Township, Warren County, Ohio, United States. The population was 3,363 at the 2020 census.

== Geography ==
According to the United States Census Bureau, the CDP has a total area of 1.6 square miles (4.1 km^{2}), all land.

== Demographics ==
Historical population
Census	Pop.	Note	%±
2020	3,363		—
U.S. Decennial Census

=== 2020 census ===
As of the 2020 census, Hunter had a population of 3,363. The median age was 42.2 years. 24.0% of residents were under the age of 18 and 17.2% of residents were 65 years of age or older. For every 100 females there were 100.1 males, and for every 100 females age 18 and over there were 95.6 males age 18 and over.

100.0% of residents lived in urban areas, while 0.0% lived in rural areas.

There were 1,215 households in Hunter, of which 30.0% had children under the age of 18 living in them. Of all households, 64.3% were married-couple households, 13.3% were households with a male householder and no spouse or partner present, and 16.6% were households with a female householder and no spouse or partner present. About 16.8% of all households were made up of individuals and 9.4% had someone living alone who was 65 years of age or older.

There were 1,255 housing units, of which 3.2% were vacant. The homeowner vacancy rate was 0.3% and the rental vacancy rate was 6.5%.

Racial composition as of the 2020 census
Race	Number	Percent
White	3,055	90.8%
Black or African American	54	1.6%
American Indian and Alaska Native	5	0.1%
Asian	50	1.5%
Native Hawaiian and Other Pacific Islander	1	0.0%
Some other race	25	0.7%
Two or more races	173	5.1%
Hispanic or Latino (of any race)	55	1.6%

=== 2000 census ===
As of the census of 2000, there were 1,737 people, 682 households, and 553 families residing in the CDP. The population density was 1,081.8 inhabitants per square mile (417.7/km^{2}). There were 692 housing units at an average density of 431.0 per square mile (166.4/km^{2}). The racial makeup of the CDP was 98.62% White, 0.23% African American, 0.35% Native American, 0.06% Asian, 0.23% from other races, and 0.52% from two or more races. Hispanic or Latino of any race were 0.46% of the population.

There were 682 households, out of which 29.5% had children under the age of 18 living with them, 71.1% were married couples living together, 6.3% had a female householder with no husband present, and 18.9% were non-families. 16.4% of all households were made up of individuals, and 5.7% had someone living alone who was 65 years of age or older. The average household size was 2.55 and the average family size was 2.85.

In the CDP, the population was spread out, with 20.8% under the age of 18, 6.8% from 18 to 24, 26.7% from 25 to 44, 31.4% from 45 to 64, and 14.3% who were 65 years of age or older. The median age was 42 years. For every 100 females, there were 101.3 males. For every 100 females age 18 and over, there were 98.4 males.

The median income for a household in the CDP was $47,132, and the median income for a family was $54,917. Males had a median income of $38,947 versus $28,064 for females. The per capita income for the CDP was $25,245. About 2.0% of families and 1.0% of the population were below the poverty line, including 1.8% of those under age 18 and none of those age 65 or over.
