= Kyle Hanslovan =

American technology businessman

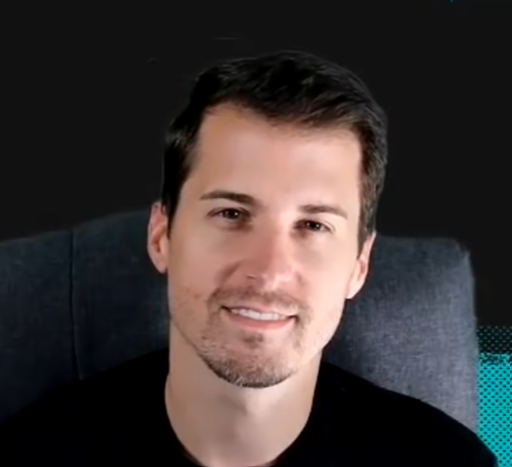
- Hanslovan in 2021
- Born: United States
- Occupations: Engineer, information technology security analyst
- Known for: Huntress

Kyle Hanslovan is an American engineer and information technology security analyst who served as a US Air Force Cyber Technical Sergeant.

Hanslovan served in the Maryland Air National Guard from 2010 to 2019, where he was part of the 175th Cyberspace Operations Group. As a technical sergeant, he was on active duty for six years and has served at bases such as the Warfield Air National Guard Base in Middle River, Maryland. In 2015, Hanslovan established Huntress Labs, a cybersecurity company valued at $1.56 billion as of July 2024.

== Career ==
Hanslovan was a non-commissioned officer in the United States Air Force from 2003 to 2010.

In 2010, he received training from the Advanced Cyber Training Program (ACTP) at ManTech. Afterwards, he served in the Maryland Air National Guard from 2010 to 2019, where he was part of the 175th Cyberspace Operations Group. As a technical sergeant, he was on active duty for six years and has served at bases such as the Warfield Air National Guard Base in Middle River, Maryland. He was also an analyst at ManTech International from 2010 to 2013 and has worked in intelligence, including for the National Security Agency.

Hanslovan was the 20 CTF (Capture the Flag) Winner at the DEF CON Conference in July 2012. He was also the 2016 NYST CTF winner in December 2016.

In 2013, he founded StrategicIO, a cybersecurity company and served as its chief executive until 2017. StrategicIO specialized in supporting cybersecurity operations for U.S. government agencies.

In 2015, Hanslovan established Huntress (also known as Huntress Labs), a cybersecurity company that specializes in threat monitoring and intelligence. As of 2023, Hanslovan is the chief executive of Huntress. The company had about 300 employees as of 2023. Huntress is valued at $1.56 billion as of July 2024 and has announced plans to go public.

== Affiliations ==
Hanslovan has been a member of the CompTIA Advisory Council since April 2020.
