= Steve Cacciatore =

American soccer player (born 1954)

Personal information
- Date of birth: May 1, 1954 (age 72)
- Place of birth: St. Louis, Missouri, U.S.
- Position: Forward

Youth career
- 1972–1975: SIUE

Senior career*
Years	Team	Apps	(Gls)
1976	Los Angeles Skyhawks		
1976	Cincinnati Comets		
1977	St. Louis Stars	1	(0)
- * Club domestic league appearances and goals

Steve Cacciatore is an American retired soccer forward who played professionally in the American Soccer League and the North American Soccer League.

Cacciatore grew up on "The Hill" (an Italian neighborhood) in St. Louis, Missouri and graduated from St. Louis University High School. He then attended Southern Illinois University Edwardsville where he played on the men's soccer team from 1972 to 1975. He, along with the rest of the 1972 team, was inducted into the SIUE Athletic Hall of Fame in 2005. On January 14, 1976, the Rochester Lancers selected Cacciatore in the third round of the North American Soccer League draft. The Los Angeles Skyhawks of the American Soccer League drafted him a week later. Cacciatore signed with the Skyhawks for the 1976 season. In 1977, he played one game for the St. Louis Stars in the North American Soccer League. The St. Louis Soccer Hall of Fame inducted Cacciatore in 2005. His brothers, Chris & Jeff also played professionally.
