= Hunted (podcast) =

Fiction podcast starring Parker Posey

Hunted is a scripted podcast starring Parker Posey.

== Background ==
The show is produced by Endeavor Audio and Wolf Entertainment. The show's producer is Elliot Wolf son of Dick Wolf the creator of Wolf Entertainment and the Law & Order franchise. The show debuted on November 12, 2019 and released episodes every Tuesday until December 17, 2019. The show is composed of eight episodes that are each roughly 25 minutes in length. The show stars Parker Posey as Deputy Marshal Emily Barnes. The show was written by Jeffrey Baker and directed by Shawn Christensen. Wolf Entertainment's first podcast was a companion podcast for Law & Order: Special Victims Unit.

== Reception ==
Miranda Sawyer wrote in The Guardian that the show followed the same predictable formula of Law & Order but that it was entertaining anyway. James Wolcott wrote in Air Mail Magazine that the show is "too one-track for its own good, so serious and intense it gives itself lockjaw." Fiona Sturges wrote in the Financial Times that some of the dialogue is cliché, but that the audio quality was very good.
