= Hunts Green, Berkshire =

Hamlet in Berkshire, England

Coordinates: 51.428186°N 1.377890°W

Hunts Green
- Location within Berkshire
- OS grid reference: SU432700
- Metropolitan borough: West Berkshire
- Metropolitan county: Berkshire
- Region: South East
- Country: England
- Sovereign state: United Kingdom
- Post town: NEWBURY
- Postcode district: RG14
- Dialling code: 01635
- Police: Thames Valley
- Fire: Royal Berkshire
- Ambulance: South Central
- UK Parliament: Berkshire

Hunts Green is a hamlet in Berkshire, England, and part of the civil parish of Boxford.

The settlement lies west of the A34 road (Newbury Bypass) and approximately 3 miles (4.8 km) north-west of Newbury.
