= Huntress (company) =

American cybersecurity company

Huntress Cybersecurity
- Type: Private
- Industry: Cybersecurity
- Founded: 2015
- Founders: Kyle Hanslovan; Chris Bisnett; John Ferrell
- Headquarters: Columbia, Maryland, United States
- Area served: Worldwide
- Key people: Kyle Hanslovan (CEO)
- Website: huntress.com

Huntress is an American cybersecurity company based in Columbia, Maryland.

== History ==
Huntress was founded in 2015 by Kyle Hanslovan, Chris Bisnett, and John Ferrell, former cyber operators for the U.S. National Security Agency (NSA). The core technology was first developed within their defense contracting firm, StrategicIO, to detect malicious footholds and persistence mechanisms on computer systems.

In late 2015, Huntress joined the Mach 37 cybersecurity accelerator program in Virginia, receiving $50,000 in seed investment.

In February 2020, Huntress raised $18 million in a Series A funding round led by ForgePoint Capital. This was followed by a $40 million Series B in May 2021 from JMI Equity, and a $60 million Series C in May 2023 from Sapphire Ventures to support product development and international expansion. A subsequent $150 million Series D round in June 2024, led by Kleiner Perkins and Meritech Capital, raised the company's valuation to over $1.5 billion.

In 2022, Huntress acquired the security awareness training platform Curricula for $22 million.

In June 2026, a former employee at Huntress alleged that another employee, still working at Huntress, tipped off a cybercriminal that US law enforcement was looking for them, passed FBI communications to the cybercriminal, and refused to cooperate with the FBI. Hanslovan denied that the employee was an insider threat, and stated that while the tip off "was not illegal, it reflected poor judgment". He also said that they had not "found evidence of illegal conduct, insider activity, or additional disclosures".

== Services ==
Huntress' cybersecurity services are focused on continuous protection, real-time threat detection, and remediation through a human-powered SOC. They include Managed EDR, Managed Security Awareness Training, Managed ITDR, Managed ISPM, and Managed SIEM.
