= The Hunter =

The Hunter may refer to:

== People ==
- John I of Aragon (1350–1396), King of Aragon known as "the Hunter"
- Klaas-Jan Huntelaar (born 1983), Dutch footballer nicknamed "The Hunter"
- Gudrød the Hunter, a petty king in Norwegian sagas
- Mehmed IV, Ottoman sultan nicknamed "the Hunter"

== Literature ==
=== Fiction ===
- "The Hunter", an 1890 short story by Olive Schreiner, featured in the collection Dreams
- The Hunter, a 1926 novel by Ernest Glanville
- The Hunter, a 1950 novel by James Aldridge
- The Hunter (Stark novel), a 1962 novel by Donald E. Westlake under the pseudonym Richard Stark
- "The Hunter", a 1967 short story by Howard Fast, featured in the collection The Hunter and The Trap
- "The Hunter", a 1969 short story by David F. Case, featured in the collection The Cell and Other Tales of Horror
- The Hunter, a 1982 novel by David Hagberg, writing as Nick Carter; the 165th installment in the Nick Carter-Killmaster series
- The Hunter, a 1984 novel by John R. Erickson
- "The Hunter", a 1988 story by Mike Resnick; part of the mosaic novel Ivory
- The Hunter, a 1990 novel by Rose Estes
- The Hunter, a 1994 picture book by Paul Geraghty
- The Hunter, a 1994 novel in the Point Horror line by L. J. Smith; the first installment in The Forbidden Game series
- The Hunter (凍える牙, Kogoeru Kiba), a 1996 novel by Asa Nonami
- The Hunter (Leigh novel), a 1999 novel by Julia Leigh
- The Hunter, a 2010 novel by Tom Wood; the first installment in the Victor the Assassin series
- The Hunter, a 2012 novel by John Lescroart; the third installment in the Wyatt Hunt series
- The Hunter, a 2014 novel by Tony Park
- The Hunter (Tana French novel), a 2024 novel by Tana French

=== Non-fiction ===
- The Hunter, a 1685 book by Gerard Langbaine
- The Hunter, a 1976 book by Christopher Keane concerning American bounty hunter Ralph "Papa" Thorson

=== Poetry ===
- The Hunter and Other Poems, a 1916 poetry book by Walter J. Turner
- "The Hunter", a 1975 prose poem by Robert Bly, featured in the collection The Morning Glory: Prose Poems

== Fictional characters ==
- Samus Aran or The Hunter, the protagonist of the Metroid video game series
- The Hunter, a character portrayed by Željko Ivanek in Heroes
- The Hunter, a character on King Leonardo and His Short Subjects
- The Hunter, a poacher and taxidermist from Little Nightmares II
- The Hunter, the main protagonist of the 2022 video game Marvel's Midnight Suns

== Films ==
- The Hunter (1980 film), a film starring Steve McQueen
- Shikari: The Hunter, a 1991 Indian Hindi-language film
- The Hunter (2010 film), a 2010 Iranian film
- The Hunter (2011 Russian film)
- The Hunter (2011 Australian film)
- The Hunter (cartoon), a 1931 Walter Lantz cartoon
- Vettaiyan or The Hunter, a 2024 Indian Tamil-language action drama film by T. J. Gnanavel

== Music ==
=== Albums ===
- The Hunter (Ike & Tina Turner album), 1969
- The Hunter (Blondie album), 1982
- The Hunter (Jennifer Warnes album), 1992
- The Hunter (Mastodon album), 2011
- The Hunter (EP), a 2011 EP by Kele

=== Songs ===
- "The Hunter" (Albert King song), 1967
- "The Hunter" (Dokken song), 1985
- "The Hunter" (Clannad song), 1989
- "The Hunter" (Iced Earth song), 1996
- "The Hunter", a 1984 song by Barry Gibb from Now Voyager
- "The Hunter", a 1986 song by GTR from GTR, covered by Asia

== Television ==
=== Episodes ===
- "The Hunter", Armchair Mystery Theatre series 3, episode 3 (1965)
- "The Hunter", Bat Masterson season 3, episode 5 (1960)
- "The Hunter", Beastmaster season 3, episode 12 (2002)
- "The Hunter", Bonanza season 14, episode 16 (1973)
- "The Hunter", Burn Notice season 3, episode 6 (2009)
- "The Hunter", Code Name: Eternity episode 3 (2000)
- "The Hunter", Combat! season 2, episode 24 (1964)
- "The Hunter", Delilah & Julius season 1, episode 22 (2006)
- "The Hunter", Generator Rex season 1, episode 13 (2010)
- "The Hunter", Gilligan's Island season 3, episode 18 (1967)
- "The Hunter", Gunsmoke season 1, episode 9 (1955)
- "The Hunter", Lady Blue episode 6 (1985)
- "The Hunter", Loonatics Unleashed season 2, episode 7 (2007)
- "The Hunter", Power Rangers Mystic Force episode 25 (2006)
- "The Hunter", Psi Factor: Chronicles of the Paranormal season 1, episode 10a (1996)
- "The Hunter", Ripcord season 2, episode 12 (1962)
- "The Hunter", Sue Thomas: F.B.Eye season 1, episode 17 (1965)
- "The Hunter", Superman episode 7a (1988)
- "The Hunter", The Adventures of Ozzie and Harriet season 2, episode 16 (1954)
- "The Hunter", The King Kong Show episode 5a (1966)
- "The Hunter", The Magic Boomerang episode 5 (1965)
- "The Hunter", The Monroes episode 8 (1966)
- "The Hunter", The New Adventures of Robin Hood season 3, episode 7 (1998)
- "The Hunter", The New Adventures of Zorro season 2, episode 6 (1998)
- "The Hunter", The Office season 2, episode 4 (2019)
- "The Hunter", Voltron: The Third Dimension season 2, episode 5 (1999)

=== Shows ===
- The Hunter, a cartoon series about a canine detective featured as a segment in the 1960–63 American animated show King Leonardo and His Short Subjects (list of episodes)
- Cacciatore: The Hunter (Italian: Il cacciatore), a 2018 Italian series also known as The Hunter

== Other uses ==
- Orion (constellation) or the Hunter
- The Hunter (comics), a comic series by Dare Comics
- theHunter, a 2009 free-to-play game by Emote Games and Avalanche Studios

== See also ==
- The Hunters (disambiguation)
- Hunter (disambiguation)
