= Hunter Peak (Texas) =

Mountain in Texas, United States

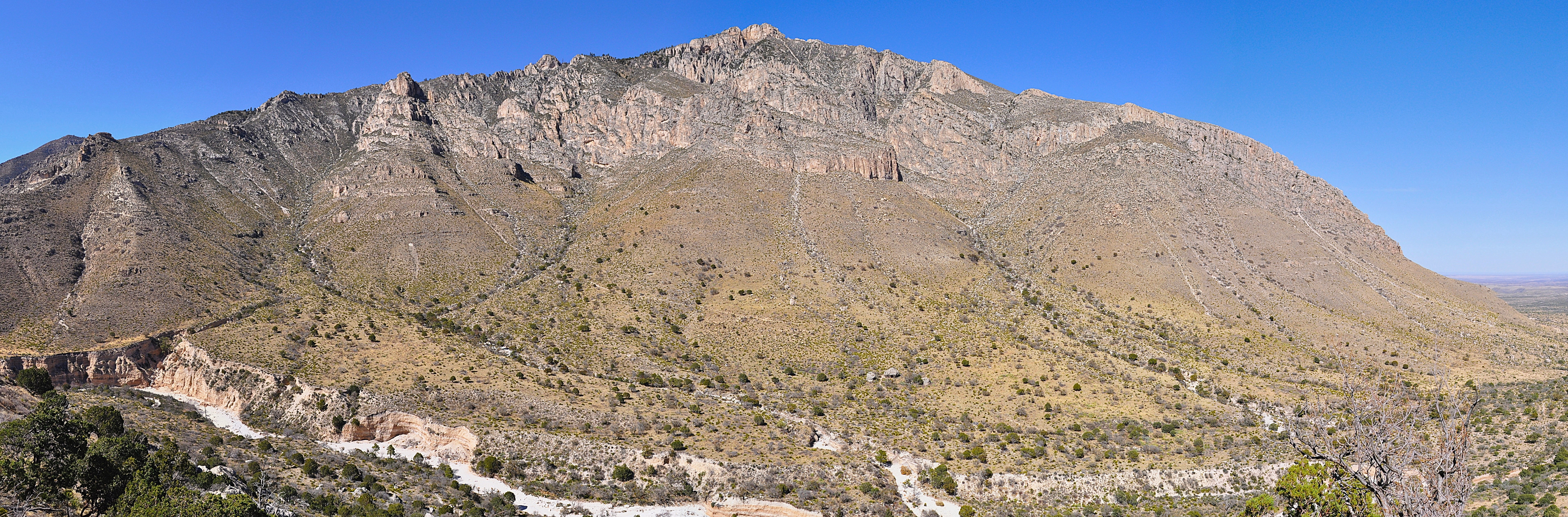
- Southwest aspect

Highest point
- Elevation: 8,376 ft (2,553 m)
- Prominence: 549 ft (167 m)
- Parent peak: Bush Mountain (8,631 ft)
- Isolation: 2.37 mi (3.81 km)
- Coordinates: 31°54′50″N 104°49′49″W

Naming
- Etymology: Jessie Coleman Hunter

Geography
- Location within Texas Location within the United States
- Country: United States
- State: Texas
- County: Culberson
- Protected area: Guadalupe Mountains National Park
- Parent range: Guadalupe Mountains
- Topo map: USGS Guadalupe Peak

Geology
- Rock age: Lopingian
- Rock type: Limestone

Climbing
- Easiest route: class 1 hiking

Hunter Peak is an 8,376-foot-elevation (2,553-meter) summit in Culberson County, Texas, United States.

== Description ==
Hunter Peak is located in Guadalupe Mountains National Park and it is immediately northwest of the park headquarters and visitor center. It ranks as the fifth-highest peak in the Guadalupe Mountains and sixth-highest in the state of Texas. The mountain is composed of late Permian limestone and Capitan Formation like the other peaks in the Guadalupe Mountains. Topographic relief is significant as the summit rises 2,500 feet (762 m) above Pine Spring Canyon in one mile (1.6 km). Precipitation runoff from the mountain's slopes drains east into the Delaware River which is part of the Pecos River watershed. The slopes of the peak support ponderosa pine, southwestern white pine, douglas-fir, and juniper. The ascent to the summit involves hiking 8.7 miles (14 km) with 2,700 feet of elevation gain via a round-trip loop up the Bear Canyon Trail and down the Tejas Trail. The mountain's toponym was officially adopted in 1966 by the United States Board on Geographic Names to remember Jessie Coleman "J.C." Hunter (1890–1945), an early proponent of the park and major landowner of what became the park. He was largely responsible for the preservation of the Guadalupe Mountains in their virgin condition.

== Climate ==
Based on the Köppen climate classification, Hunter Peak is located in a cold semi-arid climate zone with relatively hot summers, calm, mild autumn weather, and cool to cold weather in winter and early spring. Nights are cool, even in summer. Late summer monsoons bring thunderstorms.

== See also ==
- List of mountain peaks of Texas
- Geography of Texas

== Gallery ==
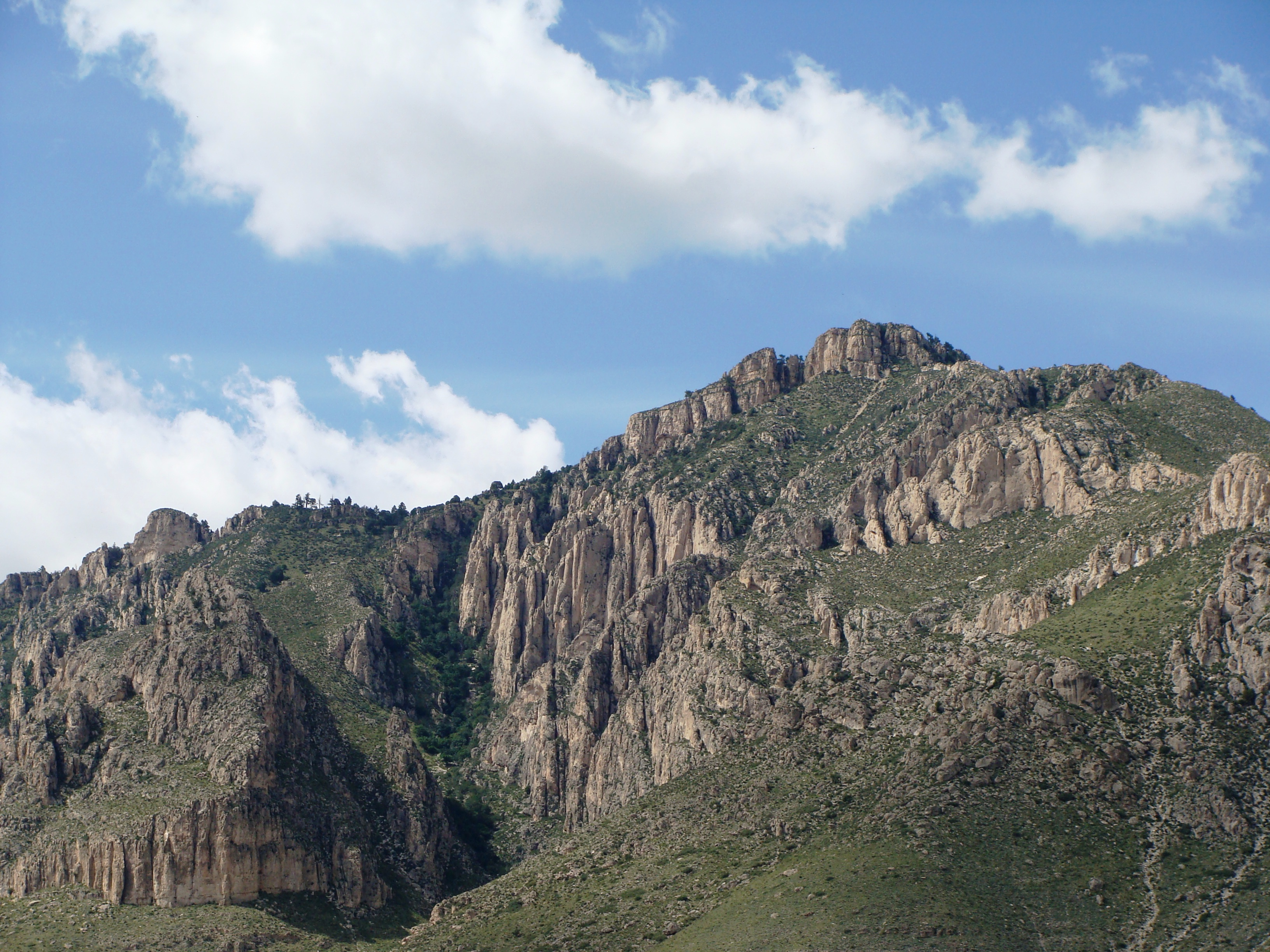
Southeast aspect

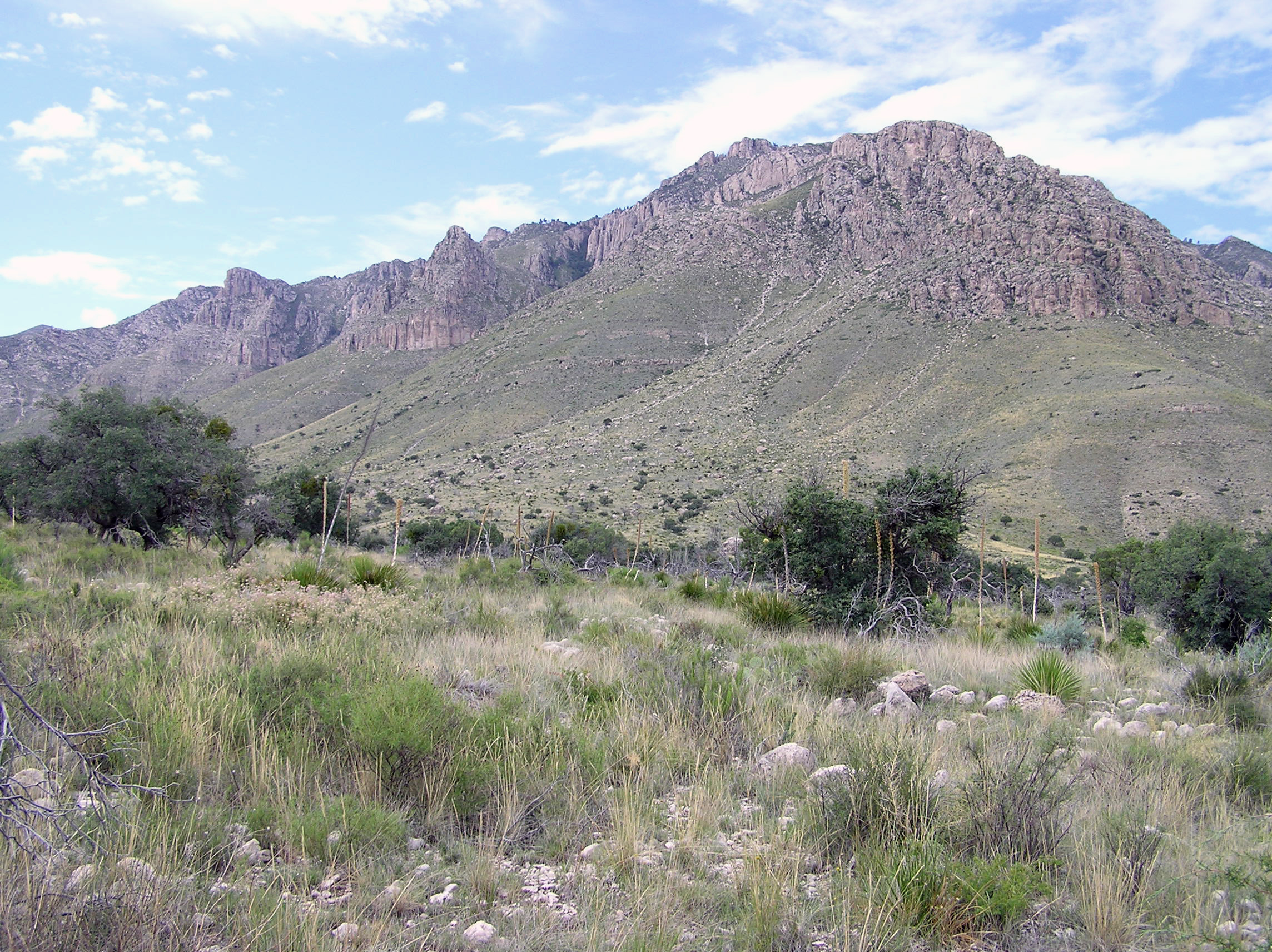
Southeast aspect

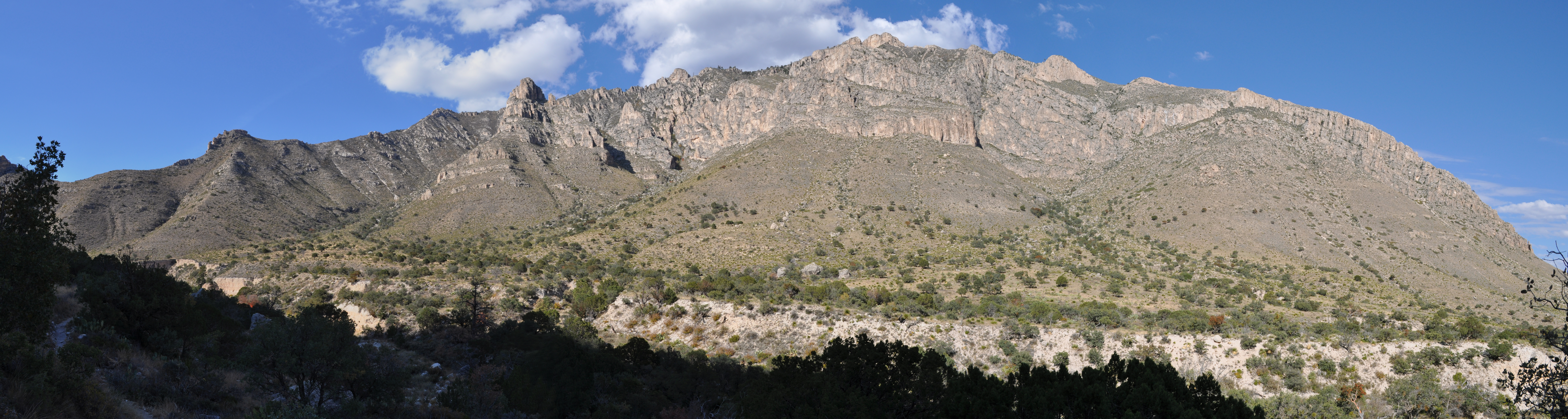
Southwest aspect

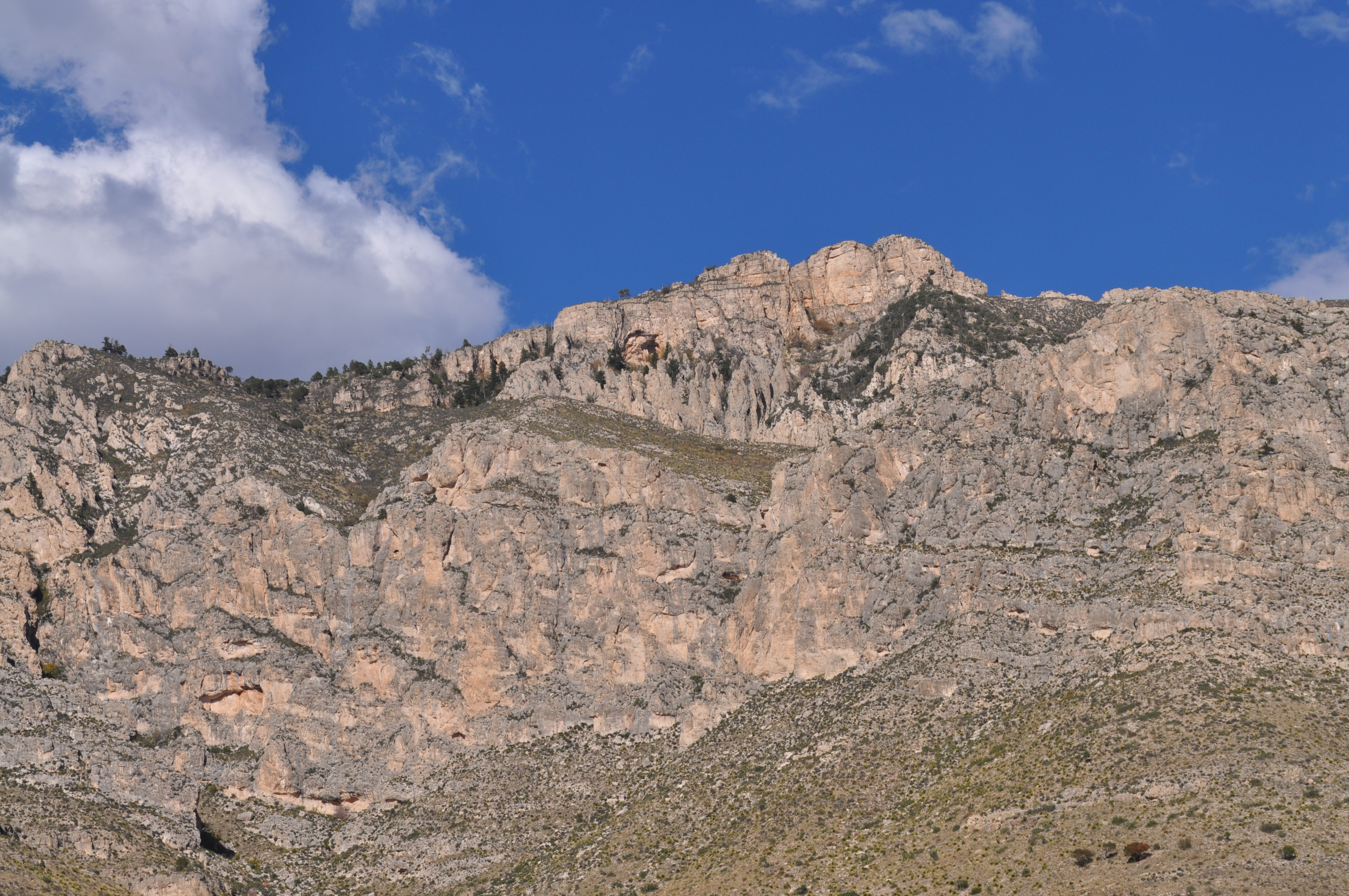
Hunter Peak from the Devils Hall Trail in Pine Spring Canyon

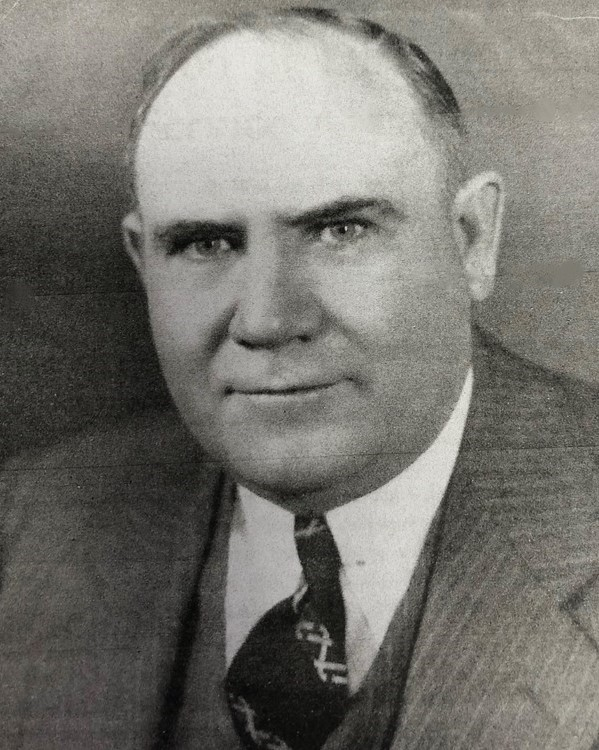
Jessie Coleman "J.C." Hunter
