= Hunter Peak =

Mountain in the state of Colorado

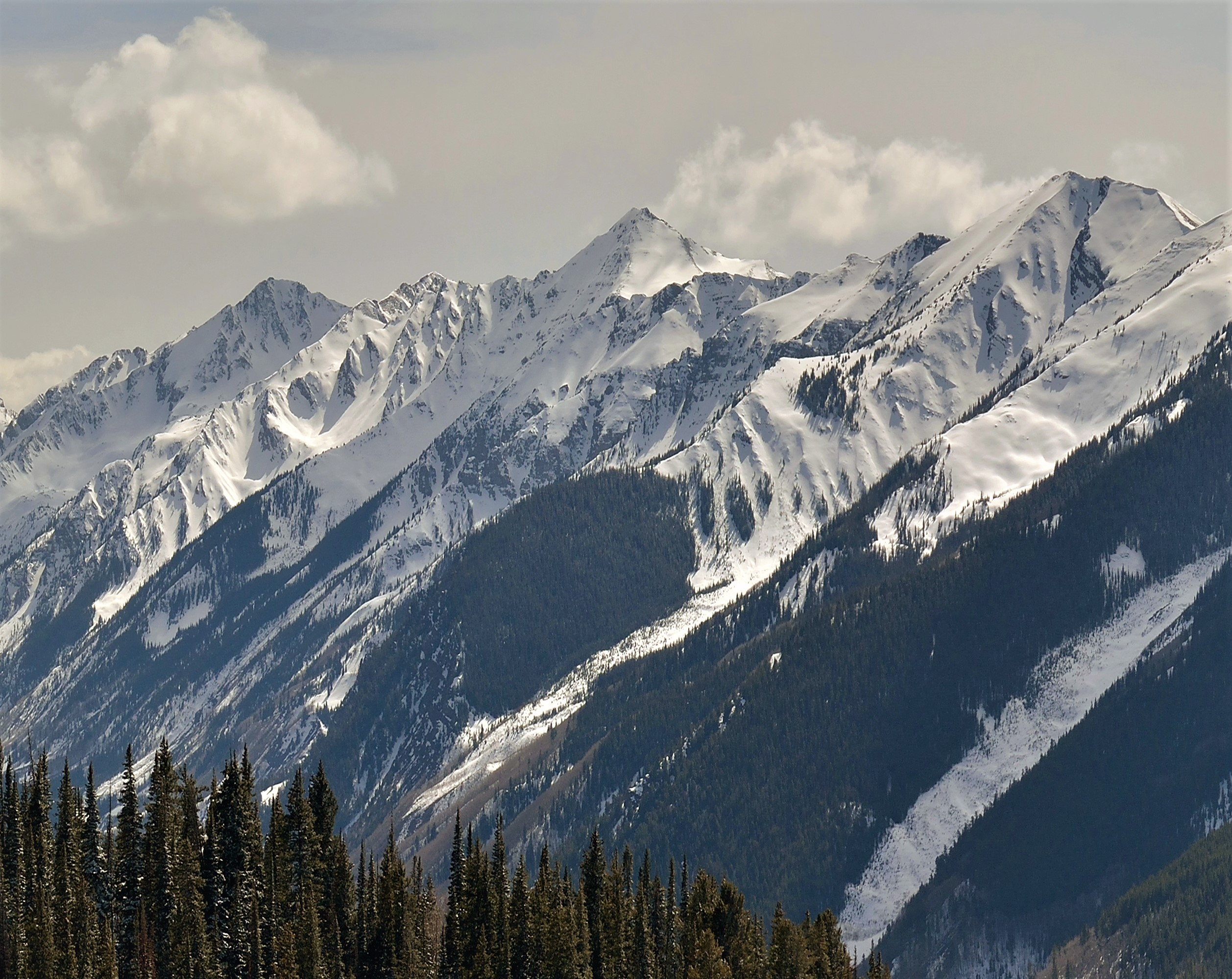
- North aspect, centered at top

Highest point
- Elevation: 13,506 ft (4,117 m)
- Prominence: 486 ft (148 m)
- Parent peak: Keefe Peak (13,532 ft)
- Isolation: 1.41 mi (2.27 km)
- Coordinates: 39°03′11″N 106°54′14″W

Naming
- Etymology: Gerald M. Hunter

Geography
- Location within Colorado Location within the United States
- Country: United States
- State: Colorado
- County: Pitkin County
- Protected area: Maroon Bells–Snowmass Wilderness
- Parent range: Rocky Mountains; Elk Mountains
- Topo map: USGS Maroon Bells

Geology
- Rock type: Hornfels

Climbing
- Easiest route: class 2+

Hunter Peak is a 13,506-foot (4,117 m) mountain summit in Pitkin County, Colorado, United States.

== Description ==
Hunter Peak is located 17 miles (27 km) west of the Continental Divide in the Elk Mountains which are a subrange of the Rocky Mountains. It ranks as the 253rd-highest peak in Colorado. The mountain is situated 10 miles (16 km) south-southwest of the community of Aspen and 4.8 miles (7.7 km) east-southeast of Maroon Bells. The peak is set in the Maroon Bells–Snowmass Wilderness on land managed by White River National Forest. Precipitation runoff from the mountain's slopes drains into tributaries of the Roaring Fork River which is a tributary of the Colorado River. Topographic relief is significant as the summit rises 3,450 feet (1,052 m) above Conundrum Creek in approximately one mile (1.6 km) and 3,700 feet (1,128 m) above East Maroon Creek in 1.5 miles (2.4 km).

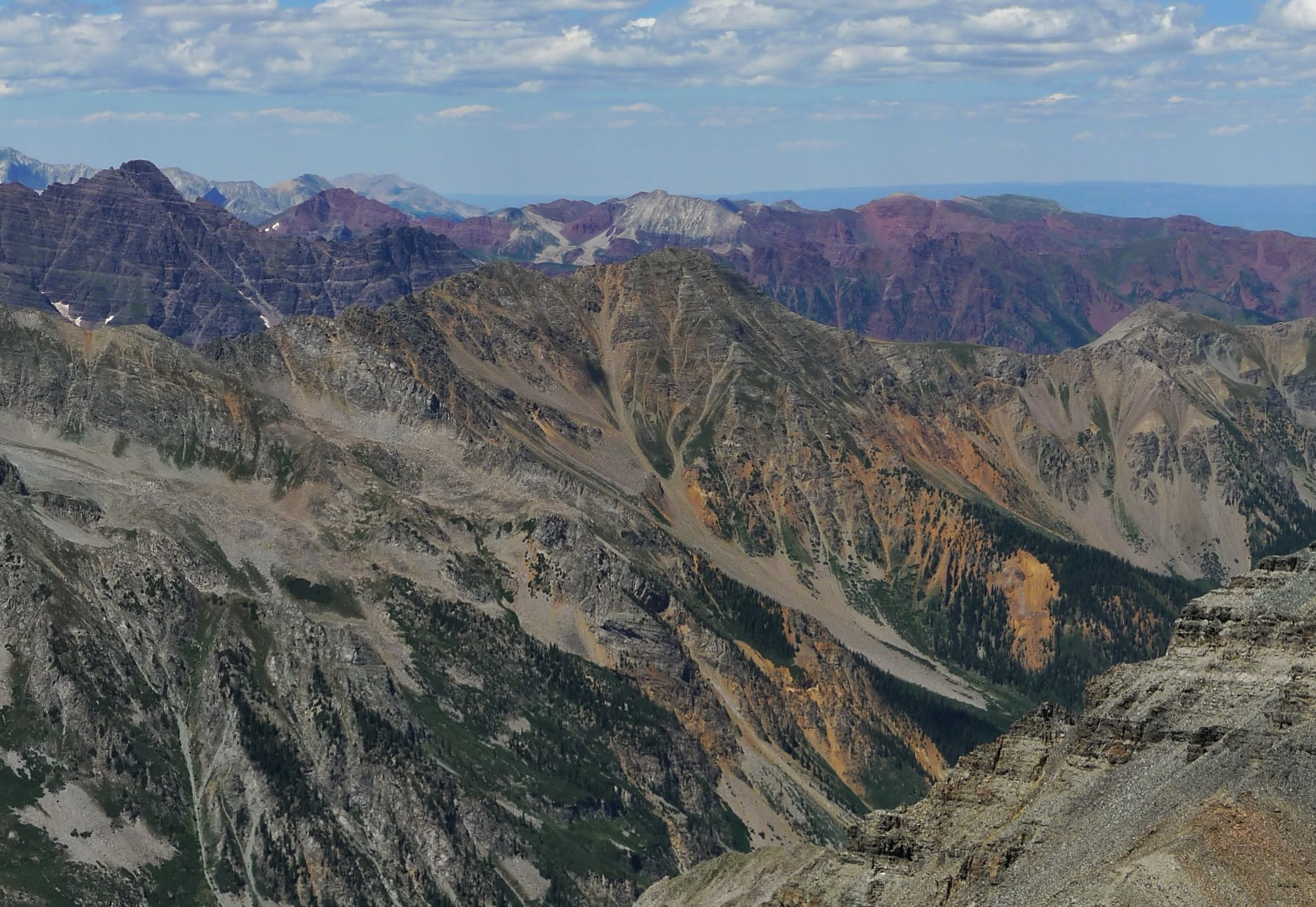
Southeast aspect of Hunter Peak (centered) viewed from Castle Peak

== Etymology ==
The mountain's toponym was officially adopted on October 1, 1930, by the United States Board on Geographic Names at the suggestion of the US Forest Service to honor Gerald M. Hunter (1892–1926), who served as deputy forest supervisor and died while in active service.

== Climate ==
According to the Köppen climate classification system, Hunter Peak is located in an alpine subarctic climate zone with cold, snowy winters, and cool to warm summers. Due to its altitude, it receives precipitation all year, as snow in winter, and as thunderstorms in summer, with a dry period in late spring.

== See also ==
- Mountains of Pitkin County, Colorado
- Thirteener
