= Hunter (surname) =

- Pronunciation: HUN-ter
- Language: English

Origin
- Origin: Great Britain
- Meaning: Hunter pursuer

Other names
- Variant form: Hunt

Hunter is a Scottish surname derived from Old English dating back to the 12th century. The name means "one who hunts" or "huntsman" and was used as an occupational name for a person who was a hunter in the Middle Ages. Common historical variations include Hunt, Huntar and Huntter. Notable people with the surname include:

== A ==
- Adam Hunter, multiple people
- Adelaide Hoodless (née Addie Hunter, 1857–1910), Canadian activist
- Adriana Hunter, British translator
- Agnes Steedman Hunter (1843–1914), Scottish hydrotherapist and activist
- Aislinn Hunter (born 1969), Canadian writer and poet
- Al Hunter, multiple people
- Alan Hunter, multiple people
- Albert Hunter (1900–1969), British politician
- Alberta Hunter (1895–1984), American singer
- Alex Hunter, multiple people
- Alexander Hunter, multiple people
- Alexis Hunter (1948–2014), New Zealand painter and photographer
- Allan Hunter (disambiguation), multiple people
- Ally Hunter (born 1949), Scottish footballer
- Alyson Hunter (born 1948), New Zealand photographer
- Amy Hunter (born 1966), American actress and model
- Andrew Hunter, multiple people named Andrew or Andy
- Andria Hunter (born 1967), Canadian women's ice hockey player
- Anji Hunter (born 1955), British political consultant
- Anne Hunter (1742–1821), Scottish poet and socialite
- Anthony R. Hunter (born 1943), British-American biologist
- April Hunter (born 1974), American professional wrestler
- Archibald Hunter (1856–1936), British Army general
- Arline Hunter (1931–2018), American actress and model
- Art Hunter (1933–2009), American football player

== B ==
- Barry Hunter, multiple people
- Bertrum Hunter (1906–1948), American baseball player
- Bill Hunter, multiple people
- Billy Hunter, multiple people
- Brian Hunter (outfielder) (born 1971), American baseball player
- Bruce Hunter, multiple people
- Buddy Hunter (born 1947), American baseball player

== C ==
- Cara Hunter (born 1995), Irish politician
- Carl Hunter (born 1965), English director, screenwriter, and bassist
- Catfish Hunter (1946–1999), American baseball player
- Catherine Hunter (born 1960), Australian filmmaker
- Charles Hunter, multiple people
- Charlie Hunter (1836–1921), Scottish professional golfer and greenskeeper
- Chris Hunter, multiple people
- Christine Hunter, American clinical psychologist and military officer
- C. J. Hunter (1968–2021), American shot putter
- Clementine Hunter (1886/1887–1988), American painter

== D ==
- Danielle Hunter (born 1994), Jamaican-born American football player
- Dario Hunter (born 1983), American rabbi, lawyer and politician
- David Hunter (1803–1888), American general
- De'Andre Hunter (born 1997), American basketball player
- Demorris Hunter (born 1966), American serial killer
- Duncan Hunter (born 1948), American politician
- Drew Hunter (born 1997), American middle-distance runner from Purcellville, Virginia
- D. V. Hunter, Commander of Sri Lanka Navy 1970–1973

== E ==
- Eddie Hunter, multiple people
- Emma Hunter (1831–1904), American telegrapher
- Erick Hunter (born 2003), American football player
- Erin Hunter (born 1982), Australian soccer goalkeeper
- Erin Hunter (born 1992), South African field hockey player
- Evan Hunter (1926–2005), American author and screenwriter

== F ==
- Faith Hunter, American author and blogger
- Felando Hunter (born 1990), perpetrator of the 2012 torture-murders of Jourdan Bobbish and Jacob Kudla in Detroit
- Francis Hunter (1894–1981), American tennis player
- Frank Hunter, multiple people
- Frederick Creighton "Newt" Hunter (1880 1963), first baseman in Major League Baseball

== G ==
- Geoff Hunter, multiple people
- Gordon Hunter, multiple people
- Grant Hunter (born 1967), Canadian politician

== H ==
- Hal Hunter, multiple people
- Harold Hunter (1974–2006), American professional skateboarder and actor
- Harold Hunter (1926–2013), American basketball coach and player
- Heather Hunter (born 1969), American hip hop artist
- Henry Hunter (RAF officer) (1893–1966)
- Herbert Hunter, multiple people
- Hezekiah Hunter (1837–1894), American teacher, minister, and politician
- Holly Hunter (born 1958), American actress
- Howard J. Hunter Jr. (1946–2007), American politician
- Howard J. Hunter III, American politician
- Howard W. Hunter (1907–1995), American church leader
- Humphrey Hunter, Scottish footballer

== I ==
- Ian Hunter, multiple people

== J ==
- J. A. Hunter (1887–1963), Scottish hunter and writer
- James Hunter, multiple people
- Janie Hunter (1918–1997), American singer and storyteller
- Jarquez Hunter (born 2002), American football player
- Jeffrey Hunter (1926–1969), American actor
- Jeremiah Hunter (born 2002), American football player
- John Hunter (American football) (born 1965), NFL player
- John Hunter (Royal Navy officer) (1737–1821), British admiral and colonial governor
- John Hunter (surgeon) (1728–1793), Scottish surgeon
- John E. L. Hunter (1897–1971), British World War I flying ace
- John Stuart Hunter, American statistician
- Johnny Hunter (rugby league) (1925–1980), Australian rugby league footballer
- Joseph Hunter (1783–1861), Sheffield antiquarian
- Justin Hunter (born 1991), American professional football player

== K ==
- Kaki Hunter (born 1955), American actress, architect, and writer
- Karen Hunter (born 1966), American journalist, talk show host, publisher, and author
- Kathryn Hunter (born 1957), British actress
- Kathryn M. Hunter, Australian–New Zealand historian
- Kelly Hunter (born 1963), British actress
- Kenneth Hunter, multiple people
- Kenny Hunter (born 1962), Scottish sculptor
- Kim Hunter (1922–2002), American actress

== L ==
- Lee Hunter (disambiguation), multiple people
- Lindsey Hunter (born 1970), American basketball player and coach
- Lissa Hunter, American artist
- Long John Hunter (1931–2016), American blues guitarist, singer and songwriter
- Louis C. Hunter (1898–1984), American economic historian
- Lurlean Hunter, American singer

== M ==
- Marc Hunter (1953–1998), New Zealand singer
- Mark Hunter, multiple people
- Martin Hunter, multiple people
- Matt Hunter (disambiguation), multiple people
- Matthew A. Hunter (1878–1961), metallurgist
- Megan Hunter (born 1984), English novelist and poet.
- Michael Hunter, multiple people
- Mollie Hunter (1922–2012), Scottish writer

== N ==
- Nicki Hunter, American pornographic director and actress
- Norman Hunter, multiple people
- Neilia Hunter Biden (1942–1972), First wife of Joe Biden
- Nyziah Hunter (born 2004), American football player

== O ==
- Othello Hunter (born 1986), American-Liberian basketball player in the Israeli Basketball Premier League

== P ==
- Paul Hunter, multiple people
- Pete Hunter (born 1980), American professional football player
- Peter Hunter, multiple people

== R ==
- R. J. Hunter (born 1993), American basketball player
- Rachel Hunter (born 1969), New Zealand model
- Raymond Hunter (1938–2020), Irish cricketer and rugby union player
- Reginald D. Hunter (born 1969), American comedian
- Rielle Hunter (born 1964), American film producer
- Robert Hunter, multiple people
- Robin Hunter (actor) (1929–2004), British actor
- Ron Hunter (born 1964), American basketball coach (father of R. J.)
- Ronald Hunter (c. 1943–2013), American actor
- Ruby Hunter (1955–2010), Australian singer-songwriter

== S ==
- Samuel D. Hunter (born 1981), American playwright
- Sarah Hunter (born 2003), Australian footballer
- Scott Hunter, multiple people
- Siobhan Hunter (born 1994), Scottish footballer
- Sophia Hunter (born 1964), Jamaican hurdler
- Sophie Hunter (born 1978), English theatre director, playwright, actress and singer
- Stephen Hunter (born 1946), American author
- Steve Hunter (born 1948), American guitarist
- Steven Hunter (born 1981), American professional basketball player
- Storm Hunter (born 1994), Australian tennis player

== T ==
- Tab Hunter (1931–2018), American actor
- Teola Pearl Hunter (born 1933), American politician
- Thomas Hunter, multiple people
- Tim Hunter, multiple people
- Todd Ames Hunter (born 1953), American politician
- Tom Hunter (born 1961), Scottish businessman and philanthropist
- Tommy Hunter (born 1986), American Major League baseball pitcher
- Torii Hunter (born 1975), American baseball player
- Travis Hunter (born 2003), American football player
- Travis Hunter (writer), American novelist
- Trent Hunter (born 1980), Canadian ice hockey player
- Tyrese Hunter (born 2003), American basketball player

== W ==
- William Hunter, multiple people
- Waldemar Caerel Hunter (1919–1968), Indonesian actor

== Z ==
- Zach Hunter (born 1991), American activist

== Fictional characters ==
- Dan Hunter, fictional character from the soap opera, Hollyoaks
- Hillman Hunter (The Hitchhiker's Guide to the Galaxy), a character in And Another Thing...
- Jamie Hunter, a character in the television series River City
- Kit Hunter, fictional character from the soap opera, Home and Away
- Lance Hunter, a Marvel Comics character
- Leslie Hunter, a character in the film St. Elmo's Fire
- Lisa Hunter, a character in the television series Hollyoaks
- Matt Hunter (General Hospital), character in American TV series General Hospital
- Rip Hunter, a character in DC Comics
- Roxy Hunter, a character in the film series Roxy Hunter
- Scott Hunter (Heated Rivalry), a character in the Game Changers books and the Canadian television adaptation, Heated Rivalry
- Scott Hunter (Home and Away), a character on the Australian soap opera Home and Away
- Shawn Hunter, a character in the television series Boy Meets World
- Sophie Hunter, a character in the television series, The Wild Thornberrys
- Tim Hunter (DC Comics), a character in DC Comics

== Lists of persons by title ==
- Attorney General Hunter (disambiguation)
- General Hunter (disambiguation)
- Judge Hunter (disambiguation)
- Justice Hunter (disambiguation)
- Lord Hunter (disambiguation)
- Senator Hunter (disambiguation)

== See also ==
- Hunter (given name)
- Hunter (disambiguation)
