= Alexander Hunter (disambiguation) =

Alexander Hunter (1729–1809) was a Scottish physician, known also as a writer and editor.

Alexander Hunter is also the name of:

- Alexander Hunter (planter) (1750–1804), American tobacco planter
- Alexander Hunter (novelist) (1843-1914) American writer
- Alexander Hunter (footballer) (1862–1899), Welsh footballer
- Alexander Hunter (politician), Northern Irish politician
- Alexander Hunter (Madras surgeon) (1816–1890), Scottish surgeon in Madras and patron of art
- Alexander W. Hunter (born 1988), American actor
- Alex Hunter (footballer) (1895–1984), Scottish footballer (goalkeeper for Queen's Park, Tottenham Hotspur)
- Alex Hunter (economist) (1919–1971), Scottish-Australian industrial economist
- Sandy Hunter (born 1939), British Air Marshal
- Sandy Hunter (footballer) (fl. 1920s), Scottish footballer for Hamilton Academical and Motherwell

== See also ==
- Alex Hunter (disambiguation)
- Hunter (surname)
