= Alex Hunter =

Alex Hunter may refer to:

- Alex Hunter (footballer) (1895–1984), Scottish footballer
- Alex Hunter (character), a fictional character from the FIFA franchise by EA Sports
- Alex Hunter (economist) (1919–1971), Scottish-Australian industrial economist
- Alex Hunter, district attorney of Boulder, Colorado during the JonBenét Ramsey murder investigation

== See also ==
- Alexander Hunter (disambiguation)
