= Attorney General Hunter =

Attorney General Hunter may refer to:

- Michael J. Hunter (born 1956), Attorney General of Oklahoma
- Richard C. Hunter (1884–1941), Attorney General of Nebraska

== See also ==
- Hunter (surname)
- Hunter (given name)
- Hunter (disambiguation)
- General Hunter (disambiguation)
