= Senator Hunter =

Senator Hunter may refer to:

== Members of the United States Senate ==
- John Hunter (South Carolina politician) (1750–1802), U.S. Senator from South Carolina from 1796 to 1798
- Richard C. Hunter (1884–1941), U.S. Senator from Nebraska from 1934 to 1935
- Robert M. T. Hunter (1809–1887), Confederate States Senator from Virginia from 1862 to 1865; U.S. Senator from Virginia from 1847 to 1861
- William Hunter (senator) (1774–1849), U.S. Senator from Rhode Island from 1811 to 1821

== United States state senate members ==
- Andrew J. Hunter (1831–1913), Illinois State Senate
- Andrew Hunter (Methodist preacher) (1813–1902), Arkansas State Senate (also elected U.S. Senator from Arkansas in 1866, but never seated)
- Edward M. Hunter (1826–1878), Wisconsin State Senate
- John F. Hunter (1896–1957), Ohio State Senate
- John Hunter (Westchester County, New York) (1778–1852), New York State Senate
- Jon Blair Hunter (born 1938), West Virginia State Senate
- Mattie Hunter (born 1954), Illinois State Senate
- Thomas Hunter (New York politician) (1834–1903), New York State Senate
- Tupac A. Hunter (born 1973), Michigan State Senate

== See also ==
- Hunter (surname)
- Hunter (given name)
- Hunter (disambiguation)
