= Chris Hunter =

Chris or Christopher Hunter may refer to:

- Christopher Hunter (physician) (1675–1757), English physician
- Chris Hunter (musician) (b. 1957), British saxophonist
- Chris Hunter (chemist) (b. 1965), New Zealand chemist and lecturer
- Chris Hunter (field hockey) (b. 1972), Canadian field hockey player
- Chris Hunter (officer) (b. 1972 or 1973), pseudonym of a British author and bomb disposal expert
- Chris Hunter (basketball) (b. 1984), American basketball player
- Chris Hunter (actor) (b. 1987), American actor
- Chris Hunter (Phusion Projects), American founder of the Phusion Projects beverage company

== See also ==
- Chris Hunt (disambiguation)
- Christopher Hunter Shays
