= Thomas Hunter =

Thomas Hunter may refer to:

== Politics ==
- Thomas Hunter (New York politician) (1834–1903), New York politician
- Thomas Hunter (Irish politician) (1883–1932), Sinn Féin politician in the First Dáil and Second Dáil
- Thomas Hunter (Scottish politician) (1872–1953), MP for Perth, 1935–1945
- Thomas Orby Hunter, British MP for Winchelsea

== Sports ==
- Thomas Hunter (soccer) (born 1988), American soccer player
- Thomas John Hunter (1881–1928), Scottish football defender
- Tom Hunter (coach) (born 1990/1991), Australian rules football coach
- Tom Hunter (golfer) (1843–?), Scottish golfer
- Tom Hunter (lacrosse), American lacrosse player
- Tommy Hunter (baseball) (born 1986), American baseball pitcher
- Tommy Hunter (footballer) (1863–1918), footballer for Wolverhampton Wanderers

== Music ==
- Tommy Hunter (fiddler) (1919–1993), North Carolina fiddler
- Tom Hunter (singer) (1946–2008), American folk singer
- Tommy Hunter (1937–2026), Canadian country music singer

== Films ==
- T. Hayes Hunter (Thomas Hayes Hunter, 1884–1944), American film director
- Thomas Hunter (actor) (1932–2017), American actor who appeared in several Italian films

== Other ==
- Thomas Hunter (school founder) (1831–1915), founder of Hunter College in New York
- Thomas Hunter (dentist) (1863–1958), New Zealand dentist and public health administrator
- Thomas Hunter (psychologist) (1876–1953), British psychologist
- Thomas Hunter (RFC officer) (1897–1917), World War I flying ace
- Tom Hunter (VC) (1923–1945), recipient of the Victoria Cross
- Sir Tom Hunter (born 1961), Scottish entrepreneur and philanthropist
- Tom Hunter (artist) (born 1965), photographer
- Thomas Hunter, fictional protagonist of Ted Dekker's Circle Trilogy
- Thomas Lomax Hunter, American poet and politician in Virginia
- Tom Hunter station, a light rail station in the Hidden Valley neighborhood of Charlotte, North Carolina
