= Archibald Hunter (disambiguation) =

Sir Archibald Hunter (1856–1936) was a British Army general.

Archibald Hunter may also refer to:

- Archibald Hunter (hydrotherapist) (1813–1894), Scottish naturopath
- Archie Hunter (1859–1894), Scottish footballer
