= General Hunter =

General Hunter may refer to:

- Archibald Hunter (1856–1936), British Army general
- Charles H. Hunter (soldier) (1817–1870), Pennsylvania Militia brigadier general in the American Civil War
- David Hunter (1802–1886), Union Army major general
- Frank O'Driscoll Hunter (1894–1982), U.S. Army Air Force major general
- George King Hunter (1855–1940), U.S. Army major general
- Martin Hunter (British Army officer) (1757–1846), British Army general
- Peter Hunter (British Army officer) (1746–1805), British Army lieutenant general
- Robert Hunter (colonial administrator) (1666–1734), British Army general

== See also ==
- Aylmer Hunter-Weston (1864–1940), British Army lieutenant general
- Hunter (surname)
- Hunter (given name)
- Hunter (disambiguation)
- Attorney General Hunter (disambiguation)
