= Judge Hunter =

Judge Hunter may refer to:

- Edwin F. Hunter (1911–2002), judge of the United States District Court for the Western District of Louisiana
- Elmo Bolton Hunter (1915–2003), judge of the United States District Court for the Western District of Missouri
- James Hunter III (1916–1989), judge of the United States Court of Appeals for the Third Circuit

== See also ==
- Hunter (surname)
- Hunter (given name)
- Hunter (disambiguation)
- Justice Hunter (disambiguation)
