= James Hunter =

James Hunter may refer to:

== Entertainment ==
- James Hunter (military artist) (1755–1792), military artist in British India
- James H. Hunter (1890–1982), Scottish-born Canadian Christian mystery writer
- James Hunter (singer) (born 1962), English R&B singer
- Jamie Hunter (River City), a fictional character on River City
- Jim Hunter, fictional character on Scottish soap opera Take the High Road

== Law and politics ==
- James Hill Hunter (1839–1891), Ontario politician
- James Hunter (politician) (1882–1968), Australian politician
- James Hunter III (1916–1989), American judge, Third Circuit Court of Appeals
- James S. Hunter (1900–1965), American politician

== Sports ==
- Jimmy Hunter (1879–1962), New Zealand rugby union footballer
- Catfish Hunter (James Augustus Hunter, 1946–1999), American baseball pitcher, 1960s–'70s
- Jim Hunter (skier) (born 1953), Canadian alpine ski racer
- James Hunter (American football) (1954–2010), American football defensive back
- Jim Hunter (baseball) (born 1964), American baseball pitcher, 1990s
- James Hunter (basketball) (born 1991), Australian basketball player
- James Hunter (cricketer) (born 2002), Irish cricketer
- James Hunter (footballer, born 1898) (1898–1982), Scottish footballer (Falkirk, Newcastle, New Bedford)
- James Hunter (rower) (born 1992), New Zealand rower
- Jim Hunter (boxer), British boxer
- Jimmy Hunter (New Zealand footballer), New Zealand international football player

== Other ==
- James de Graaff-Hunter (1881–1967), British-born geodesist
- James William Hunter (1783–1844), Scottish inventor
- James Hunter (minister) (1863–1942), co-founder of the Evangelical Presbyterian Church
- James Hunter, one of the Perth Martyrs
- James Hunter (historian) (born 1948), British historian
- James Davison Hunter (born 1955), professor of sociology at the University of Virginia
- James P. Hunter (1985–2010), Army journalist killed in the War in Afghanistan
- Jim Hunter (sportscaster), American sports journalist, CBS Radio
- James Wilson Hunter (1904–1987), American Episcopal bishop of Wyoming
