= Charles N. Hunter (disambiguation) =

Charles N. Hunter may refer to:

- Charles Newton Hunter, soldier and author of a book on his combat experiences in Burma during World War II
- Charles Norfleet Hunter, newspaper editor and civil rights campaigner

== See also ==
- Charles Hunter (disambiguation)
