= Lord Hunter =

Lord Hunter may refer to:

- William Hunter, Lord Hunter (1865-1967), Scottish politician and judge
- John Oswald Mair Hunter, Lord Hunter (1913–2006), Scottish judge
- Robert Hunter, Baron Hunter of Newington (1915–1994), Scottish physician and peer

== See also ==
- Hunter (surname)
- Hunter (given name)
- Hunter (disambiguation)
