= Allan Hunter =

Allan Hunter may refer to:

- Allan O. Hunter (1916–1995), American lawyer and politician
- Allan Hunter (cricketer) (1926–1982), New Zealand cricketer
- Allan Hunter (footballer) (born 1946), Northern Ireland-born footballer
- Allan Hunter (rugby union) (1922–2017), New Zealand rugby union player and schoolteacher

== See also ==
- Alan Hunter (disambiguation)
- Al Hunter (disambiguation)
