= Justice Hunter =

Justice Hunter may refer to:

- Donald Hunter (judge) (1911–1991), associate justice and chief justice of the Supreme Court of Indiana
- Hocking H. Hunter (1801–1872), associate justice of the Ohio Supreme Court
- John A. Hunter (judge) (1833–1887), chief justice of the Utah Supreme Court
- Robert N. Hunter Jr. (born 1947), associate justice of the North Carolina Supreme Court
- Robert T. Hunter (c. 1908–2000), associate justice of the Washington Supreme Court

== See also ==
- Hunter (surname)
- Hunter (given name)
- Hunter (disambiguation)
- Judge Hunter (disambiguation)
