= Kenneth Hunter =

Kenneth Hunter may refer to:

- Kenneth Hunter (physician) (1939–2013), Scottish consultant physician
- Kenneth Hunter (cricketer) (1881–1960), English cricketer and stockbroker
- Kenneth Adams Hunter (1904–?), Canadian Surgeon General
- Ken Hunter (born 1957), Australian rules football player
- Kenny Hunter, Scottish sculptor
