= Chris Hunt (disambiguation) =

Chris Hunt (b. 1962 or 1963) is a British journalist, magazine editor, and author.

Chris or Christopher Hunt may also refer to:

- Chris Hunt (badminton) (b. 1968), British badminton player
- Christopher Hunt (fl. 1584–1607), English publisher

== See also ==
- Chris Hunter (disambiguation)
