= Gordon Hunter =

Gordon Hunter may refer to:

- Gordon Hunter (footballer, born 1954), English footballer (York City)
- Gordon Hunter (footballer, born 1967), Scottish footballer (Hibernian)
- Gordon Hunter (judge), (1863–1929), Canadian lawyer and judge
- Gordon Hunter (rugby union, born 1949) (1949–2002), New Zealand rugby union player, coach and selector
- Gordon Hunter (rugby union, born 1958), Scottish rugby union player
- Gord Hunter (born 1946), Ottawa city councillor
- Billy Hunter (baseball) (Gordon William Hunter, 1928–2025), baseball player and manager

== See also ==
- Hunter (surname)
