= Jeffrey Hunter (disambiguation) =

Jeffrey Hunter (1926–1969) was an actor.

Jeffrey Hunter may also refer to:

- Jeff Hunter (politician) (born 1959), Australian politician
- Jeff Hunter (American football) (born 1966), American football player

== See also ==
- Geoffrey Hunter (disambiguation)
