= 1867 Open Championship =

Tournament information
- Dates: 26 September 1867
- Location: Prestwick, South Ayrshire, Scotland
- Course: Prestwick Golf Club

Statistics
- Field: 14 players
- Prize fund: £16
- Winner's share: £7

Champion
- (Scotland) Tom Morris, Sr.
- 170

Location in Scotland

The 1867 Open Championship was the eighth Open Championship and was held on 26 September at Prestwick Golf Club. Tom Morris, Sr. won the championship for the fourth time, by two shots from Willie Park, Sr. Tom Morris, Sr. was 46 years old and remains the oldest Open Championship winner.

For the first time, an amateur, William Doleman, led after a first round of 55, a stroke ahead of Robert Andrew. Doleman had a second round 66 and dropped out of contention. Tom Morris, after a round of 54, went into the lead with Willie Park and Robert Andrew two shots behind. Andrew had a final round of 65 to drop him out of the prize money. Andrew Strath had the best final round of 56 to finish third, while young Tom Morris finished with prize money for the first time.

== Final leaderboard ==
Thursday, 26 September 1867

Place	Player	Score	Money
1	(Scotland) Tom Morris, Sr.	58-54-58=170	£7
2	(Scotland) Willie Park, Sr.	58-56-58=172	£5
3	(Scotland) Andrew Strath	61-57-56=174	£3
4	(Scotland) Tom Morris, Jr.	58-59-58=175	£1
5	(Scotland) Bob Kirk	57-60-60=177	
6	(Scotland) William Doleman (a)	55-66-57=178	
7	(Scotland) Robert Andrew	56-58-65=179	
T8	(Scotland) Willie Dow	62-57-65=184	
T8	(Scotland) Tom Hunter	62-60-62=184	
10	(Scotland) Willie Dunn, Sr.	64-63-62=189	
