= Robert Hunter =

Robert or Bob Hunter may refer to:

== Arts ==
- Robert Hunter (painter) (died 1780), Irish portrait painter
- Robert Hunter (encyclopædist) (1823–1897), British editor of the Encyclopædic Dictionary
- Robert Hunter (author) (1874–1942), American sociologist and progressive author
- Bob Hunter (Los Angeles sportswriter) (1913–1993)
- Robert Hunter (lyricist) (1941–2019), American lyricist, poet, songwriter, singer
- Robert Hunter (journalist) (1941–2005), Canadian environmentalist and journalist, co-founder of Greenpeace
- Bob Hunter (Ohio sportswriter) (fl. 1975–2010s), American columnist
- Hunter (rapper) or Robert Alan Hunter (1975–2011), Australian hip hop artist

== Politics ==
- Robert Hunter (colonial administrator) (1666–1734), lieutenant governor of Virginia Colony, governor of New York, New Jersey, Jamaica
- Robert M. T. Hunter (1809–1887), U.S. speaker of the House of Representatives
- Robert W. Hunter (1837–1916), Virginia newspaper editor and Confederate officer
- Robert Hunter (American politician), Vermont state representative
- Robert Hunter (Australian politician) (1877–1960), member of the South Australian House of Assembly
- Robert Dean Hunter (1928-2023), American politician from Texas
- Robert E. Hunter (1940–2026), U.S. ambassador to NATO
- Robert C. Hunter (born 1944), U.S. judge, North Carolina Court of Appeals
- Robert N. Hunter Jr. (born 1947), U.S. judge, North Carolina Court of Appeals
- Robert L. Hunter (1898–1997), American judge, lawyer, politician, and American football player

== Sport ==
- Robert Hunter (footballer) (1883–1962), English footballer
- Robert Hunter (golfer) (1886–1971), American golfer and Olympic gold medalist
- Robbie Hunter (cyclist) (born 1977), South African cyclist
- Robbie Hunter-Paul (born 1976), New Zealand former rugby league footballer
- Robert Hunter (rower) (1904–1950), Canadian rower

== Other people ==
- Robert Hunter (merchant) (1792–1848), British diplomat and trader in southeast Asia
- Robert Hunter (civil servant) (1844–1913), British civil servant, co-founder of the National Trust
- Robert Hunter, Baron Hunter of Newington (1915–1994), British physician and university administrator
- Robert S. Hunter, recipient of the Navy Cross
- J. Robert Hunter (born 1936), American consulting actuary and consumer advocate

== Fictional ==
- Robbie Hunter (Home and Away), a character on Home and Away
- Bob Hunter (Desperate Housewives), a character on Desperate Housewives

== Other uses ==
- MY Steve Irwin or Robert Hunter, Sea Shepherd Conservation Society ship
- SS Robert M. T. Hunter, a Liberty ship
