= Eddie Hunter =

Eddie Hunter may refer to:

- Eddie Hunter (footballer, born 1928) (1928–2002), Scottish footballer (Falkirk FC)
- Eddie Hunter (footballer, born 1943) (1943–2025), Scottish footballer and manager (Queen's Park)
- Eddie Hunter (baseball) (1905–1967), Major League Baseball third baseman
- Eddie Hunter (EastEnders), fictional character on the British soap opera EastEnders
- Eddie Hunter (River City), fictional character on the British soap opera River City
- Eddie "Skate" Hunter, fictional character in the Streets of Rage video game series
- Eddie Hunter (American football) (born 1965), American football player
