= Annabel Langbein =

New Zealand celebrity chef

Annabel Langbein ONZM
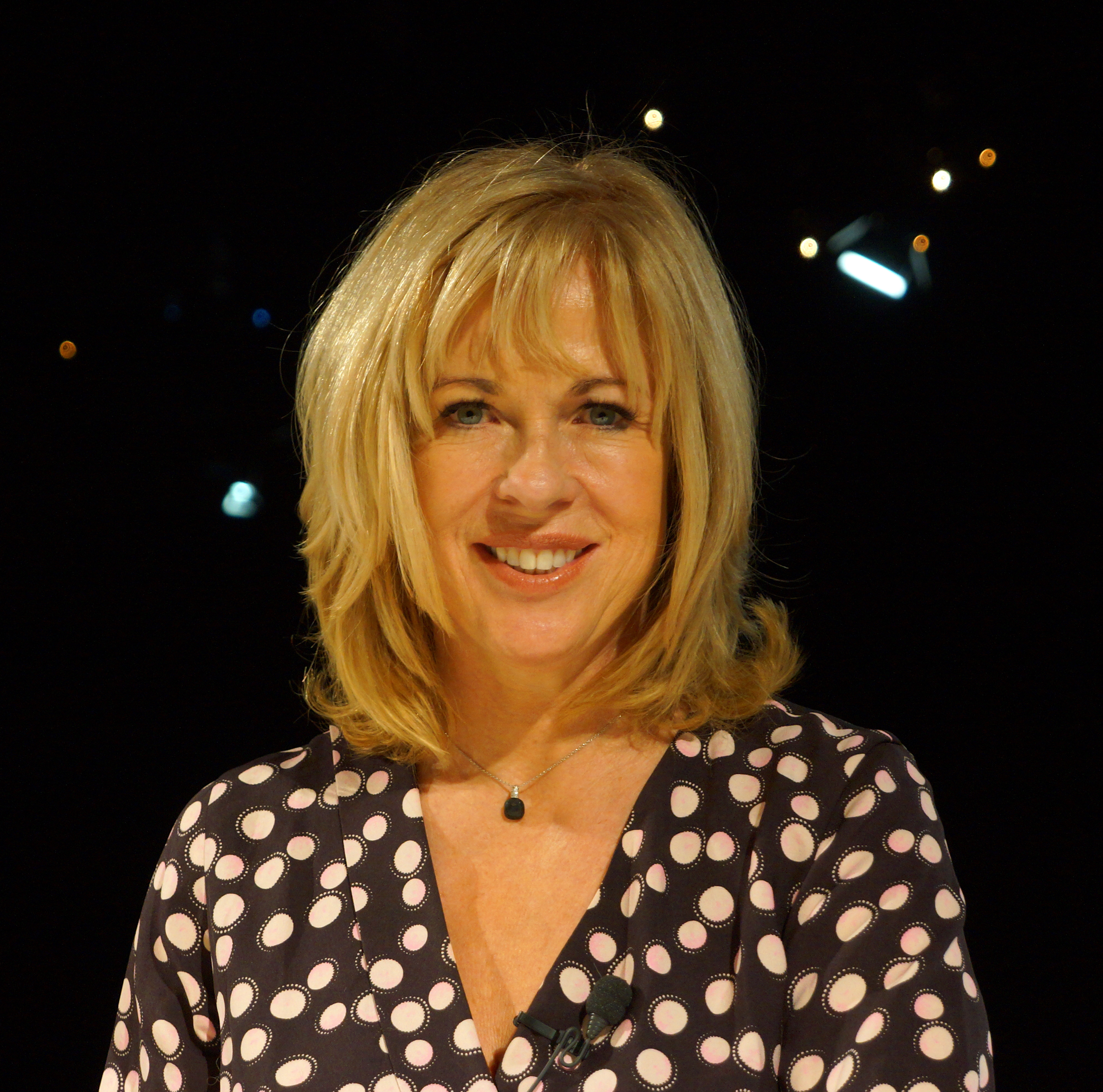
- At 2012 Frankfurt Book Fair
- Born: 1958 (age 67–68); Mangakino, New Zealand
- Occupations: Celebrity cook; food writer; television host; publisher
- Spouse: Ted Hewetson (m. 1991)
- Children: 2

Annabel Rose Langbein (born 1958) is a New Zealand celebrity cook, food writer and publisher. She has published over 30 cookbooks, and co-produced three seasons of her award-winning television series, Annabel Langbein The Free Range Cook, which launched on the TV One network in New Zealand and has since screened in more than 90 countries.

== Early life, family and education ==
Langbein was born in Mangakino and grew up in Wellington. She was the youngest of two daughters of Fred and Anne Langbein. Her father worked as an engineer but was a keen vegetable gardener and beekeeper, while her mother was a cook and home science university graduate. She credits her mother as the inspiration for her love of cooking.

Langbein has described herself as being a hippie as a teenager. She left home at age 16 to live for several years with her then-boyfriend and their friends in a run-down house by the Whanganui River, without electricity or running water. They were self-reliant and lived off their hunting, fishing and a half-hectare vegetable garden, and her cooking skills were honed by experimentation. She subsequently moved to Gisborne where she worked as a possum trapper and met her future husband, Ted Hewetson. At age 22, she moved overseas and went backpacking in South America, running her own bar in Brazil for a while, before returning to New Zealand when she was 25. Langbein and Hewetson married in 1991. They have two children, Sean and Rose, and have homes in Auckland and Wānaka.

She has never formally trained as a chef, but obtained a Diploma of Horticulture with Distinction from Lincoln University in 1981, and attended residential cooking courses at the Culinary Institute of America in upstate New York.

== Career ==
Since 1984, Langbein has worked as a food writer, writing for several magazines including The New Zealand Herald's Canvas magazine, NZ Life & Leisure, NZ Listener and Cuisine, as well as writing and publishing her own cookbooks. She has appeared on The Today Show in the US, Saturday Kitchen in the UK, 24Kitchen in The Netherlands and numerous other media outlets.

=== Books ===
Langbein self-published her first book of recipes in 1988, and has since built one of New Zealand's most successful publishing houses, Annabel Langbein Media. She has authored and self-published 25 cookbooks, which have been published in numerous languages and sold more than two million copies all around the world. The Best of Annabel Langbein: Great Food for Busy Lives, was published in 1997, has been reprinted numerous times since and is known as "the kitchen bible" in many New Zealand households. Her 2010 book The Free Range Cook was available in more than 70 countries and sold more than 110,000 copies.

In 1991 she established the Culinary Institute of New Zealand, a specialist food marketing consultancy, and was responsible for marketing and media campaigns for New Zealand food manufacturers, retailers and exporters, as well as promoting New Zealand food offshore for Trade New Zealand. For seven years she was a director of the New Zealand gourmet cheese company Kapiti and for three years she was a judge for the International Association of Culinary Professionals' Julia Child Award for the best first cookbook.

Her philanthropic work has included raising substantial sums for the National Heart Foundation of New Zealand, the Life Education Trust, and other charity groups.

=== Television ===
UK-based global content company FremantleMedia first noticed Langbein's presenting skills in 2008, when she posted on YouTube a series of how-to cooking features that she had made to promote her book Eat Fresh. They approached her and offered to back her to produce a fully-fledged TV series.

In August 2010, New Zealand's TV One debuted her show, Annabel Langbein The Free Range Cook, a 13-part cooking and lifestyle series filmed at Langbein's cabin on the shores of Lake Wānaka and showcasing New Zealand's scenery and artisanal produce. She co-produced the series and worked with a seven-person TVNZ crew over a six-month filming schedule. It was the first time she had fronted her own cooking show and series on television, but she has since co-produced two further seasons of the show.

The series has been distributed worldwide by FremantleMedia, and has appeared on the ABC and SBS networks in Australia and other networks in France, The Netherlands, Belgium, Sweden, Poland, Israel, the UK, Canada, Asia, Brazil and Japan. In Brazil the show airs on the GNT cable channel under the translated title A Cozinha Caseira de Annabel (Annabel's Homemade Cooking).

Year	Programme	Episodes	Duration
2010	Annabel Langbein The Free Range Cook	13 episodes	30 minutes
2012	Annabel Langbein The Free Range Cook: Simple Pleasures	13 episodes	30 minutes
2014	Annabel Langbein The Free Range Cook: Through the Seasons	13 episodes	30 minutes

== Honours ==
Langbein's books and TV series have won numerous national and international awards. In February 2016 she won the People's Choice Award for Best Home Chef in a TV Series at the US-based Taste Awards.

Her books have won Gourmand World Cookbook Awards for Best Entertaining Cookbook, Best Easy Recipes Cookbook and Best Celebrity Cookbook. In 2013 she won NZ Guild of Food Writers Culinary Quills for best website, best TV series and best book, and in 2014 she won Best Culinary Series and Best Presenter at the Best on the Box People's Choice Awards. The Best of Annabel Langbein: Great Food for Busy Lives won the 1999 New Zealand Guild of Food writers Recipe Book of the Year award, while Savour the Pacific: A Discovery of Taste won the Best Photography in the World award at the World Cookbook Awards in Périgueux, France, as well as a Ladle at the 2001 World Food Media Awards.

In 2008, Langbein was inducted into the Wellington Girls' College Business Hall of Fame, and in 2013 she received New Zealand's most prestigious individual achievement award, a World Class New Zealand Award. Langbein was awarded an honorary Doctor of Commerce degree by Lincoln University in 2017.

In the 2018 Queen's Birthday Honours, Langbein was appointed an Officer of the New Zealand Order of Merit, for services as a food writer.

== Bibliography ==
- Annabel Langbein's Cookbook: Featuring Recipes from the New Zealand Listener (ISBN 0-908829-00-0, 1988)
- Smart Food for Busy People: Stylish Food for New Zealanders (ISBN 978-0-473-02228-0, 1993)
- More Taste Than Time: Fast Track Food for Busy People (ISBN 0-473-02821-2, 1994)
- With Fork & Spoon: Easy Imaginative Food for Time-Hungry People (ISBN 0-473-03976-1, 1996)
- The Best of Annabel Langbein: Great Food for Busy Lives (ISBN 978-0-9582029-0-9, 1999)
- Savour the Pacific: A Discovery of Taste (ISBN 978-0-9582029-2-3, 2000)
- Savour Italy: A Discovery of Taste (ISBN 978-0-9582029-3-0, 2001)
- Cooking to Impress Without Stress (ISBN 978-0-9582029-5-4, 2003)
- Assemble: Sensational Food Made Easy (ISBN 978-0-9582029-9-2, 2005)
- Desserts: New Healthy Kitchen – Colorful Recipes for Health and Well-Being (ISBN 978-0-7432-7860-7, 2006)
- Grilling: New Healthy Kitchen – Colorful Recipes for Health and Well-Being (ISBN 978-1-74089-611-5, 2007)
- Eat Fresh: Cooking Through the Seasons (ISBN 978-0-9582029-7-8, 2007)
- Celebrate: A Calendar of Cakes for Special Dates (ISBN 978-0-9582029-6-1, 2008)
- Anyone Can Cook: Fresh Ideas for Busy Lives (ISBN 978-0-9582668-0-2, 2009)
- Anyone Can Bake: Home Baked Treats Made Easy (ISBN 978-0-9582668-3-3, 2010)
- Annabel Langbein The Free Range Cook (ISBN 978-0-9582668-4-0, 2010)
- Annabel Langbein Free Range in the City (ISBN 978-0-9582668-5-7, 2011)
- Annabel Langbein The Free Range Cook: Simple Pleasures (ISBN 978-0-9582668-6-4, 2012)
- Annabel Langbein A Free Range Life (ISBN 978-1-4630771-2-9, 2013)
- Annabel Langbein The Free Range Cook: Through the Seasons (ISBN 978-0-9582668-7-1, 2014)
- Annabel Langbein Winter Goodness (2015)
- Annabel Langbein Endless Summer (ISBN 978-5-0060-0004-9, 2015)
- Annabel Langbein Share the Love (ISBN 978-5-0060-0007-0, 2016)
- Annabel Langbein Celebrate Summer! (2016)
- Annabel Langbein Cheap Thrills (2017)
- ESSENTIAL Volume 1: Best-Ever Meals for Busy Lives (ISBN 978-0-9582668-9-5, 2017)
- ESSENTIAL Volume 2: Sweet Treats for Every Occasion (ISBN 978-0-473-41766-6, 2017)
- Bella: My Life in Food (ISBN 978-1-9885-4761-9, 2020)
