= Alan Hunter =

Alan Hunter may refer to:

- Alan Hunter (VJ) (born 1957), video jockey on MTV from 1981 to 1987
- Alan Hunter (author) (1922–2005), English author of crime fiction
- Alan Hunter (soccer) (born 1964), Australian football (soccer) player
- Alan Hunter (Australian rules footballer) (born 1944), Australian rules footballer for Footscray
- Alan Hunter (athlete) (1913–2002), Scottish athlete
- Alan Hunter (singer), New Zealand singer-songwriter
- Alan Hunter (astronomer) (1912–1995), English astronomer, Director of the Royal Greenwich Observatory

== See also ==
- Allan Hunter (disambiguation)
- Al Hunter (disambiguation)
