= Matt Hunter =

Matt Hunter may refer to:

- Matt Hunter (mountain biker) (born 1983), Canadian sportsman
- Matt Hunter (singer) (born 1998), American Latin-influenced pop singer, now known as Matt Hunter Correa
- Matt Hunter (General Hospital), fictional character in American TV series General Hospital

== See also ==
- Hunter (name)
