= Ian Hunter =

Ian Hunter may refer to:

== Arts and entertainment ==
- Ian Hunter (actor) (1900–1975), South African-born British actor
- Ian McLellan Hunter (1915–1991), English screenwriter
- Ian Hunter (impresario) (1919–2003), British classical music promoter
- Ian Hunter (artist) (1939–2017), British artist
- Ian Hunter (singer) (born 1939), English singer-songwriter
- Ian Hunter (curator) (1947–2023), Northern Irish artist and art curator
- Ian Hunter (visual effects supervisor), American visual effects artist

== Sports ==
- Ian Hunter (Scottish footballer) (fl. 1960s), Scottish footballer
- Ian Hunter (soccer) (born 1961), Australian footballer
- Ian Hunter (rugby union) (born 1969), English rugby player
- Ian Hunter (cricketer) (born 1979), British cricketer

== Others ==
- Ian M.L. Hunter (1927–2004), British experimental psychologist
- Ian Hunter (admiral) (1939–2022), New Zealand naval officer
- Ian Hunter (politician) (born 1960), South Australian politician

== Other uses ==
- Ian Hunter (album), 1975 music album

== See also ==
- Ian Huntley (1974–2026), English convicted double-murderer
