= Herbert Hunter =

Herbert Hunter may refer to:

- Herbert B. Hunter (1890–1976), architect in North Carolina
- Herbert Hunter (footballer), see 1906–07 Crystal Palace F.C. season
- Herb Hunter (footballer) (1881–1915), Australian rules footballer and athlete
- Herb Hunter (baseball) (1895–1970), baseball player
