= Lee Hunter =

Lee Hunter may refer to:

- Lee Hunter (Hollyoaks), a fictional character from the British soap opera Hollyoaks
- Lee Hunter (engineer) (1913–1986), automotive engineer
- Lee Hunter (footballer) (born 1974), English footballer
- Lee Hunter (American football) (born 2002), American football player
