= John E. L. Hunter =

British World War I flying ace

- Born: John Ellis Langford Hunter; 31 January 1897; Hackney, London, England
- Died: 18 June 1971 (aged 74); South Africa
- Burial place: Somerset West, Western Cape, South Africa
- Military career
- Allegiance: United Kingdom
- Branch: Royal Navy; Royal Air Force
- Service years: 1916–1919
- Rank: Captain
- Unit: No. 4 Squadron RNAS/No. 204 Squadron RAF
- Awards: Distinguished Service Cross; Distinguished Flying Cross

Captain John Ellis Langford Hunter DFC, DSC (31 January 1897 – 18 June 1971) was a British World War I flying ace credited with 13 confirmed aerial victories.

== Biography ==
=== Early life ===
Hunter was born in Hackney, London, the only son of Ellis Hunter, and was educated at Bedford Modern School.

=== Aerial service ===
He entered the Royal Naval Air Service as a probationary flight officer (temporary), appointed to HMS President, on 1 October 1916, and after completing his training was commissioned as a flight sub-lieutenant on 13 June 1917.

Hunter joined No. 4 Squadron, flying a Sopwith Camel, in July. On 3 September, he and Flight Sub-Lieutenant K. V. Turney drove down a German observation plane out of control. On the 22nd, he shared one of his two victories with Turney when they shot down two seaplanes northeast of Ostend, for which he was subsequently awarded the Distinguished Service Cross.

Hunter was promoted to flight lieutenant on 31 December 1917. His next victory came on 21 March 1918 when he destroyed a Pfalz D.III off Middelkerke, and he destroyed another on the 26th. Soon after, on 1 April, the Army's Royal Flying Corps (RFC) and the Royal Naval Air Service (RNAS) were merged to form the Royal Air Force, and No. 4 Naval Squadron was renamed No. 204 Squadron RAF.

On 16 July 1918 Hunter was appointed a temporary captain while serving as a flight commander. He continued to score sporadically until 12 August, when he flamed one Fokker D.VII, destroyed another, and drove a third down out of control, to bring his total to 13. He suffered a leg wound in the process, but the action won him the Distinguished Flying Cross.

=== Aerial victory list ===
No.	Date/time	Aircraft	Foe	Result	Location	Notes
1	3 September 1917 @ 1650 hours	Sopwith Camel serial no. B3879	Reconnaissance craft	Driven down out of control	1 mile southwest of Gistel, Belgium	Victory shared with another RNAS pilot
2	22 September 1917 @ 0815 hours	Sopwith Camel s/n B3879	Seaplane	Destroyed	22 miles northeast of Ostend, Belgium	Victory shared with two other RNAS pilots
3	22 September 1917 @ 0815 hours	Sopwith Camel s/n B3879	Seaplane	Destroyed	22 miles northeast of Ostend, Belgium	
4	21 March 1918 @ 0825 hours	Sopwith Camel s/n B3879	Pfalz D.III fighter	Destroyed	5 miles off Middelkerke, Belgium	
5	26 March 1918 @ 1700 hours	Sopwith Camel s/n B3879	Pfalz D.III fighter	Destroyed	1 1/2 miles northeast of Diksmuide, Belgium	
6	2 May 1918 @ 1815 hours	Sopwith Camel s/n B3879	Rumpler reconnaissance craft	Driven down out of control	South of Diksmuide, Belgium	
7	20 May 1918 @ 1020 hours	Sopwith Camel s/n B3879	Seaplane	Forced to land; destroyed	Northeast of Ostend, Belgium	
8	30 June 1918 @ 1445 hours	Sopwith Camel s/n B3895	Fokker D.VII fighter	Driven down out of control	Blankenberge, Belgium	Not listed in Shores, et al.
9	31 July 1918 @ 1930 hours	Sopwith Camel s/n B3894	Fokker D.VII fighter	Destroyed	Roulers, Belgium	
10	31 July 1918 @ 1930 hours	Sopwith Camel s/n B3894	Fokker D.VII fighter	Destroyed	Roulers, Belgium	
11	12 August 1918 @ 1055 hours	Sopwith Camel s/n B3894	Fokker D.VII fighter	Destroyed by fire	Blankenberge, Belgium	
12	12 August 1918 @ 1055 hours	Sopwith Camel s/n B3894	Fokker D.VII fighter	Destroyed	Blankenberge, Belgium	
13	12 August 1918 @ 1055 hours	Sopwith Camel s/n B3894	Fokker D.VII fighter	Driven down out of control	Blankenberge, Belgium	

=== Postwar career ===
Hunter was confirmed in the rank of captain on 21 January 1919, but left the RAF six months later, being transferred to the unemployed list, on 2 July.

Ellis died in South Africa in 1971, and is buried in the cemetery at Somerset West, Western Cape.

== Awards and citations ==
Distinguished Service Cross
Flight Sub-Lieutenant John Ellis Langford Hunter, R.N.A.S.

"In recognition of his services with a Wing of the R.N.A.S. at Dunkirk between July and September, 1917, during which time he has carried out continuous work on offensive patrols. On 22 September 1917, he destroyed two enemy aircraft which were attempting to interfere with our spotting machines."

Distinguished Flying Cross
Lieutenant (Temporary Captain) John Ellis Langford Hunter, D.S.C. (Sea Patrol).

"A fine fighting pilot and flight leader. On 12 September, whilst leading his formation on escort duty, he engaged nine Fokker biplanes. He destroyed two and drove a third down out of control. In this combat he was severely wounded in the leg."
