= Christopher Hunter (physician) =

English antiquarian

- Born: July 1675
- Died: 1757 (aged 81–82)
- Occupations: Physician and antiquarian

Christopher Hunter (July 1675 – 1757) was an English physician and antiquarian.

== Biography ==
Hunter was born in July 1675, the only son of Thomas Hunter of Medomsley, Durham, by his second wife, Margaret Readshaw (Surtees, Durham, ii. 289). He was educated at the free grammar school of Kepyer in Houghton-le-Spring, Durham. In 1692, he was admitted pensioner of St. John's College, Cambridge, and became a favourite pupil of Thomas Baker (1656–1740) [q. v.], whose sister Margaret was the wife of John Hunter, Christopher's elder brother. From this connection he derived a taste for antiquarian pursuits. He took the degree of bachelor of medicine in 1698, and soon afterwards settled in practice at Stockton-on-Tees. He had a license, dated 7 October 1701, from Dr. John Brookbank, spiritual chancellor of Durham, to practise physic throughout the diocese of Durham. On 1 August 1702 he married, at Durham Abbey, Elizabeth, one of the two daughters and coheiresses of John Elrington of Espersheales in the parish of Bywell, Northumberland. A few years later he removed from Stockton to Durham, a place much more congenial to his social and antiquarian tastes. He became a regular frequenter of the fine library of the dean and chapter, but there is a tradition that he was eventually refused access for spilling a bottle of ink over a valuable copy of Magna Charta. He discovered coins, excavated altars, and traced roads and stations at Lanchester and Ebchester. To the success of his researches on Roman ground, the altars preserved in the Cathedral Library at Durham bear solid testimony; while his valuable local knowledge was of the highest use to Horsley in compiling his `Britannia Romana' (pp. 250–91), and to Gordon in his 'Itinerarium Septentrionale' (Addenda, p. 13). He also rendered considerable assistance to Wilkins in his `Concilia' (vol. i. preface), and he contributed materials for Bourne's `History of Newcastle-upon-Tyne.' In April 1743, Hunter circulated proposals for printing by subscription in two quarto volumes a parochial history of the diocese of Durham, collected from the archives of the church of Durham, the chancery rolls there, and the records in the Consistory Court. With a view, probably to the completion of this work he was entrusted by Thomas Bowes of Streatlam with the valuable Bowes manuscripts. Hunter's intended history, however, never saw the light. His publications were confined to an anonymous reissue, with considerable additions, of Davies's 'Rites and Monuments of the Church of Durham,' 12mo, 1733, four papers in the `Philosophical Transactions,' and `An Illustration of Mr. Daniel Neal's History of the Puritans, in the article of Peter Smart, A.M. ... from original papers, with remarks,' 8vo, 1736, also without his name. In the spring of 1757 Hunter retired from Durham to his wife's estate at Unthank in the parish of Shotley, Northumberland, where he died on 12 July of that year, and was buried in Shotley Church. His wife survived him, together with his eldest son, Thomas. John, his younger son, and Anne, an only daughter, died long before him.

Hunter's manuscript topographical collections in twenty-one closely written volumes in folio were after his death offered for sale by his executors. Two volumes of transcripts from the chartularies of the church of Durham, written in an extremely neat hand, and a bundle of loose papers, were purchased by the dean and chapter of Durham for twelve guineas; but Thomas Randal, one of the executors, perceiving that the dean and chapter were likely to become the purchasers of the whole, for some reason stopped the sale of the remaining volumes. Another volume was in the possession of the family in 1820, but many appear to be irretrievably lost, Surtees (Durham, vol. i. pt. ii. p. 161) pays a high tribute to the value of Hunter's labours. The greater portion of Hunter's library was sold to John Richardson, bookseller, of Durham, for about 350l. His cabinets of Roman antiquities and coins were acquired by the dean and chapter of Durham. Hunter was elected F.S.A. on 15 Dec. 1725 (Gough, List of Soc. Antiq., p. *4). Three letters from Lister to Hunter are printed in Nichols's `Literary Anecdotes,' ix. 690–1.
