= Scott Hunter =

Scott Hunter may refer to:

- Scott Hunter (musician), vocalist with Poor Old Lu
- Scott Hunter (American football) (born 1947), American football player
- Scott Hunter (Heated Rivalry), a fictional character from the Canadian TV series Heated Rivalry and the Game Changers novel series
- Scott Hunter (Home and Away), a fictional character from the Australian soap opera Home and Away
