= Norman Hunter =

Norman Hunter may refer to:

- Norman Hunter (writer) (1899–1995), English children's author
- N. C. Hunter (Norman Charles Hunter, 1908–1971), British playwright
- Norman Hunter (speedway rider) (born 1940), English motorcycle speedway rider
- Norman Hunter (footballer) (1943–2020), English international footballer
