= James Hunter (footballer, born 1898) =

Scottish footballer

Personal information
- Full name: James Aiton Hunter
- Date of birth: 5 July 1898
- Place of birth: Balfron, Scotland
- Date of death: 1982 (aged 83–84)
- Place of death: Campbeltown, Scotland
- Height: 5 ft 8 in (1.73 m)
- Position: Left back

Senior career*
| Years | Team | Apps | (Gls) |
| 1919 | Newcastle United | 0 | (0) |
| 1919 | Motherwell | 3 | (0) |
| 1919–1924 | Falkirk | 136 | (1) |
| 1924–1925 | Newcastle United | 10 | (0) |
| 1925–1930 | New Bedford Whalers | 170 | (0) |
| Total | | 319 | (1) |

International career
| 1923 | Scottish League XI | 2 | (0) |
- * Club domestic league appearances and goals

James Aiton Hunter, also known as James Semple (5 July 1898 – 1982) was a Scottish footballer who played as a left back.

His first senior club at the end of World War I was Newcastle United, but before playing a first-team match he then signed for Motherwell while still registered as a Newcastle player; however it was decided that the transfer was acceptable with no fee due. Hunter soon moved on to Falkirk at the end of 1919, spending the next four years with the Bairns and being selected twice for the Scottish Football League XI in 1923.

In January 1924 he returned to Newcastle for a free of £3,500 with the club anticipating the need to replace defender Frank Hudspeth who was then 33, but the veteran played on for several more years. Hunter served as back-up until 1925, with a high asking price deterring clubs in Britain; instead he moved away to play in the American Soccer League with New Bedford Whalers, where he played until 1930.
