= Andrew Hunter =

Andrew Hunter or Andy Hunter may refer to:

== Sports ==
- Andrew Hunter (British swimmer) (born 1986), British swimmer who was a medalist in the Commonwealth Games
- Andrew Hunter (Irish swimmer) (born 1952), Irish swimmer
- Andrew Hunter (rugby league) (born 1977), Australian rugby league player
- Andy Hunter (footballer, born 1864) (1864–1888), Scottish footballer (Aston Villa FC)
- Andy Hunter (footballer, born 1883) (1883–1933), Irish football forward
- Drew Hunter (born 1997), American distance runner

== Other ==
- Andrew Hunter (British politician) (born 1943), British politician and a member of the Orange Order
- Andrew Hunter (lawyer) (1804–1888), attorney in Charles Town, Virginia, who prosecuted John Brown for the raid on Harpers Ferry
- Andrew Hunter (Methodist preacher) (1813–1902), Methodist preacher often called "Father of Methodism in Arkansas"
- Andrew Hunter (minister) (1743–1809), Moderator of the General Assembly of the Church of Scotland
- Andrew Hunter (preacher) (died 1638), Scottish minister and political agent
- Andrew Hunter (priest) (born 1957), South African Anglican clergyman
- Andrew J. Hunter (1831–1913), U.S. Representative from Illinois
- Andrew P. Hunter, American defense official
- Andy Hunter (DJ) (born 1974), British Christian DJ and composer of electronic dance music
- Andy Hunter (EastEnders), a fictional character from the BBC soap opera EastEnders, played by Michael Higgs
