= Eddie Hunter (footballer, born 1928) =

Scottish footballer (1928–2002)

Personal information
- Full name: Edward Hunter
- Date of birth: 7 March 1928
- Place of birth: Tillicoultry, Scotland
- Date of death: August 2002 (aged 74)
- Place of death: Burnley, England
- Position: Wing half

Senior career*
Years	Team	Apps	(Gls)
1952–1953	Falkirk	29	(0)
1954–1959	Accrington Stanley	169	(4)
Total		198	(4)
- * Club domestic league appearances and goals

Edward Hunter (7 March 1928 – August 2002) was a Scottish professional footballer who played as a wing half in the Football League.
