= Alyson Hunter =

New Zealand photographer and print maker

- Born: 1948 (age 76–77); Auckland, New Zealand
- Known for: Photography and prints
- Relatives: Alexis Hunter (twin)
- Website: www.alysonhunterartist.net

Alyson Hunter (born 1948) is a New Zealand photographer and print maker, resident in London, who, during the 1970s and 1980s, employed an unusual technique of etching with a chemically modified photographic image.

== Life ==
Alyson Hunter. For the Glory of the Empire (1973), print, photogravure using Kodak Photoresist (KPR).

Alyson Hunter was born in Auckland, New Zealand, and is the twin sister of artist Alexis Hunter. She studied at Auckland University, then moved to London to study at Chelsea College of Art and the Royal College of Art. With her husband, Hugh Stoneman, she was a director of Islington Studios and Islington Graphics Gallery. In the 1980s, she travelled and lectured on print making, with Adrian Frost, in America, Australia and New Zealand, where her daughter Amy Frost was born in 1981. She was Master Printer at the New York Printmaking Workshop, and, in 1981 and 1983, University of California, Davis, Visiting Professor.

In 2019 she moved to Margate where she continues to work, is active in the local art community as well as living close to daughter Amy and her grandchildren.

== Work ==
In 1971 she started making prints with an unusual technique that combined etching and photography, whereby a printing plate is created from a photograph and the plate worked on to alter the contrast, making use of the K.P.R. (Kodak Photo Resist) chemical: this is no longer available because of its toxicity. Her print, For the Glory of the Empire, made using this process, juxtaposes two 19th-century architectural features, the Albert Memorial and the terraced house as contrasting features of the legacy of the British Empire. She made a set of four prints, using this technique, of Camden Town, London, and its residents; one of these uses the background of Camden Lock behind a close-up of a gypsy boy. These two works are in the Museum of London. Three landscape etchings 1972–72, including ones of Kent Road and Romney Marsh, were acquired for the British Government Art Collection. She no longer used this photographic technique after 1987.

In 1990, she moved away from printing into photography. Her portraits of photographers, Dan Farson and Harry Diamond, are in the collection of the National Portrait Gallery.
