= Agnes Steedman Hunter =

Scottish hydrotherapist and activist (1843–1914)

- Born: Agnes Steedman Anderson; 9 August 1843; Edinburgh, Scotland
- Died: 24 April 1914 (aged 70); Bridge of Allan, Scotland
- Other names: Annie Steedman Hunter; Agnes S. Hunter
- Occupations: Hydrotherapist; writer; vegetarianism advocate; health reformer
- Spouse: Archibald Hunter (m. 1880; died 1894)

Agnes Steedman Hunter (née Anderson; 9 August 1843 – 24 April 1914), also known as Annie Steedman Hunter, (Note: A. J. and C. E. Durie refer to her throughout as "Annie Steedman Hunter" and quote an 1880 marriage notice naming her "Annie Steedman Anderson". The same study cites her 1914 death notice under the name "Agnes Steedman", and records that her stepdaughters called her "Agnes". Her 1902 book The Golden Age for Women was published under the name "Agnes S. Hunter".) was a Scottish hydrotherapist, writer, vegetarianism advocate and health reformer. She practised hydropathy in Bridge of Allan, initially while her husband Archibald Hunter operated a hydropathic establishment there and later from their home, Zetland House. Her writing addressed diet, hydropathy, vaccination, women's health and sexual morality. Hunter was a frequent contributor to the Scottish Health Reformer in the early 1900s and campaigned against compulsory smallpox vaccination. Her publications included The Golden Age for Women (1902), Vegetarianism: An Appeal to Parents (1902), Our Young Men (1905) and No More Vaccination (1905).

== Biography ==
=== Early life and marriage ===
Hunter was born Agnes Steedman Anderson on 9 Aug 1843, in Edinburgh. Little is known about Hunter's education and upbringing. She came from a large Edinburgh family. Her father, John Anderson, was a fishmonger with premises at 106 George Street in the New Town and a house called Denham Green in Trinity. The family consisted of one son and six daughters, with Hunter the eldest daughter.

On 24 June 1880, aged about 37, she married hydropathist Archibald Hunter at Denham Green. He was about 67 and had been widowed in 1878. Both families were associated with the United Presbyterian Church of Scotland. The couple honeymooned at Innellan. Hunter had no children and became stepmother to Archibald's children from his first marriage.

The couple lived at Zetland House, across the road from the Bridge of Allan hydropathic establishment. Hunter began treating female patients while her husband was alive. Vegetarianism formed a central part of her approach to health, and she encouraged her husband to reduce his consumption of meat.

=== Hydropathy and vegetarianism ===
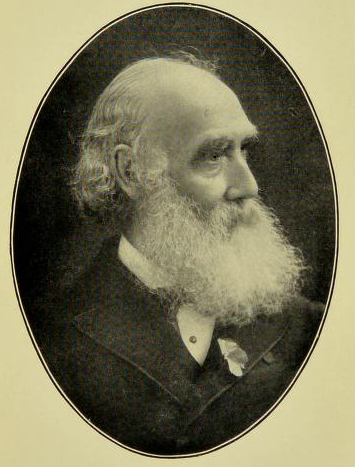
Archibald Hunter, Hunter's husband

Hunter became increasingly involved in her husband's publications. For his 1885 book Health, Happiness and Longevity, How Obtained, she supplied a chapter on dietary reform and a week's vegetarian menu with recipes.

Following Archibald's death in 1894, she continued to practise hydropathy from Zetland House. She also held consultations at the Religious Instruction Rooms in Glasgow on Tuesdays and at Zetland House on Thursdays. In the 1901 census she was recorded at Zetland House as living "on own means". In a letter later published by hydropathy historian Richard Metcalfe, Hunter said that she treated patients from Britain and overseas and received between two and three thousand letters a year.

In 1895 she spoke at a hydropathic conference in Gloucester, where she discussed her experience of hydropathic treatment. Her work also included correspondence with newspapers; in 1893 she wrote to the North British Daily Mail about the treatment of scarlet fever.

Hunter was profiled in The Vegetarian in 1898. According to the profile, she had followed a vegetarian diet since 1878 after suffering from dyspepsia and reading the American pamphlet Nature's Own Book. Hunter taught hygienic treatments, treated patients from different social classes, and gave a paper during the women's session of the 1898 National Vegetarian Congress.

=== Writing and campaigning ===
Hunter wrote extensively during the early years of the 20th century. From December 1903 she was a frequent contributor to the Paisley-based Scottish Health Reformer and Advocate of Rational Living. Her articles included "Oatmeal", "Diet and Disease", "With my Patients", "Revaccination", "Consumptive Sanatoria", "A Health Talk" and "Juvenile Smoking". Her last identified contribution to the periodical was "Early Marriages and Infant Mortality in our Large Cities", published in September 1905.

In 1902 she published The Golden Age for Women and Vegetarianism: An Appeal to Parents in Bridge of Allan. Her pamphlet Our Young Men was published by the Progressive Press of Paisley in 1905. She also contributed to the Psycho-Therapeutic Journal, including a 1905 letter on the purported influence of flowers on health and an article titled "Osteopathy" in 1906. Her article "The Heart of the Home" appeared in the Nature Cure Annual 1907–1908.

=== Vaccination ===
Hunter was active in organised opposition to compulsory smallpox vaccination. Her pamphlet No More Vaccination, published in 1905, argued against compulsory vaccination and was advertised in the Scottish Health Reformer. In 1907 she founded the League of Health Defence. An obituary in The Herb Doctor stated that she had worked for repeal of the compulsory Vaccination Acts and had been active in the anti-vaccination movement in Ireland.

=== Women and sexuality ===
Several of Hunter's writings discussed women's health, marriage and sexuality. In "The Heart of the Home", she advocated sexual education for young women and argued that women should be able to make decisions for themselves within marriage. She also wrote about sexual abuse within marriage and asserted a wife's right to refuse sex. Hunter opposed contraception, instead advocating voluntary sexual abstinence as a means of limiting family size. A. J. and C. E. Durie describe her views on women as containing conflicting positions and caution against straightforwardly characterising her as a feminist.

=== Later life and death ===
Hunter's public activity appears to have diminished after 1907, apart from a later letter to Metcalfe. Durie and Durie suggest that ill health may have contributed to her withdrawal; in her 1906 article "Osteopathy", Hunter stated that she had undergone surgery for a bowel tumour in the previous year.

Hunter died at Zetland House on 24 April 1914, aged 70, following a long illness. Her death certificate recorded the cause as "senile decay". A supporter of cremation, she was cremated at Maryhill Crematorium on 28 April. She had been a shareholder in the Scottish Burial Reform and Cremation Society and the London Cremation Company.

== Selected publications ==
- The Golden Age for Women (1902)
- Vegetarianism: An Appeal to Parents (1902)
- Our Young Men (1905)
- No More Vaccination (1905)
