= Chris Hunter (British Army officer) =

Author, motivational speaker and former bomb disposal operator

- Born: 1972 or 1973 (age 52–53)
- Military career
- Allegiance: United Kingdom
- Branch: British Army
- Service years: 1989–2007
- Rank: Major
- Units: Royal logistics corps; 22 special air service
- Conflicts: The Troubles; Iraq War; War in Afghanistan
- Awards: Queen's Gallantry Medal
- Other work: Writer; consultant

Chris Hunter is the pseudonym of a British author, bomb disposal expert and former British Army officer. Under his real name, Hunter holds the Queen's Gallantry Medal, and is therefore entitled to use the post-nominal QGM after his name.

== Military career ==
Hunter joined the British Army in 1989 as a sixteen-year-old army apprentice. He trained initially as a Russian linguist working in defence intelligence and after four years of enlisted service was selected to undergo officer training at the Royal Military Academy Sandhurst. He graduated at twenty-one, and was subsequently awarded the Carmen Sword of Honour. He was then commissioned into the Royal Logistic Corps, the route that would eventually lead to his becoming an Ammunition Technical Officer (the British Army's bomb disposal operators).

He served as a troop commander on operations in the Balkans, East Africa and Northern Ireland and undertook arctic warfare training in Norway, before becoming an Explosive Ordnance Disposal (EOD) operator. As an operator he deployed on two high-threat tours in Northern Ireland and one in Iraq, undertook EOD protection duties for the Royal Family and assisted in the planning and conduct of numerous police arrest operations involving the threat of explosive devices. He was also the designated technical Operations Officer for the national contingency response to the terrorist use of a weapon of mass destruction in the UK. He was later involved with a number of UK Special Forces counter terrorism units and saw active service in Afghanistan, Colombia and Iraq as well as on counter-terrorism operations in the UK. For his actions in Iraq he was awarded the Queen's Gallantry Medal.

== Post-military career ==
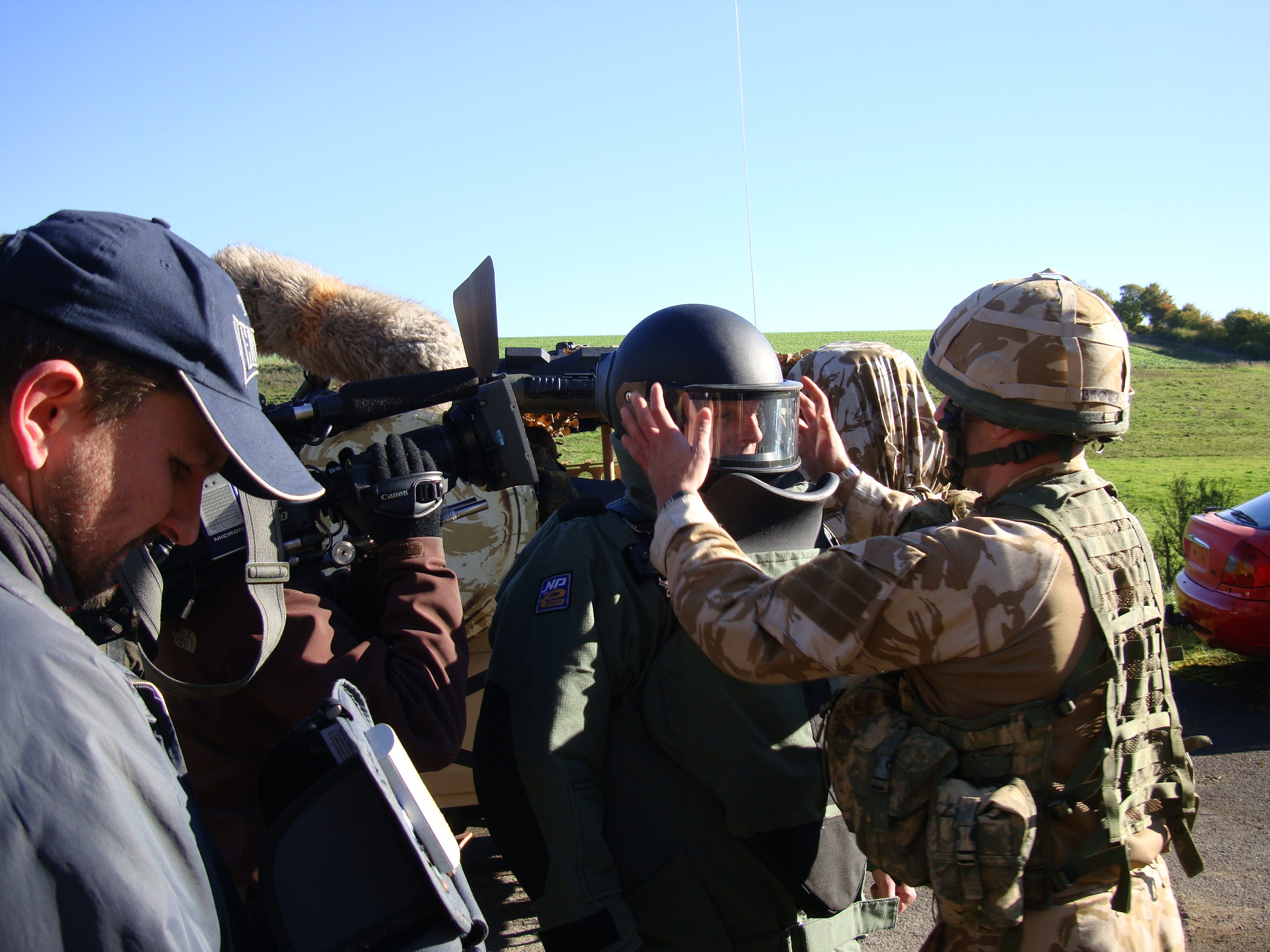
Hunter filming Bombhunters

Hunter retired from the MoD in January 2007 as the MoD's senior IED intelligence analyst and has since become a writer, broadcaster and the director of a counter-IED consultancy company. Hunter is also a Fellow of the Institute of Explosives Engineers, a Member of the International Association of Bomb Technicians and Investigators and a regular contributor to television, radio news and current affairs programmes.

Hunter presented the Military History Channel's acclaimed Bomb Hunters documentary and was named as one of the top 5 Inspirational Speakers of 2011 by the JLA Speakers Agency. In 2012 he was selected to be one of 15 Ambassadors for Prime Minister David Cameron's youth development initiative, the National Citizen Service.

He is also a supporter and donator to numerous military charities including Help for Heroes, Veterans in Action, Tickets for Troops, Walking With The Wounded, Combat Stress, The British Forces Foundation, Global Enduro, Change Step and BLESMA for which he trained to run the 2009 London Marathon while wearing a complete bomb disposal suit, completing it in 6hrs 56mins and setting a new world record.

== Published work ==
Hunter's first book, Eight Lives Down, was published in October 2007. It covers the four-month period he served as a Bomb Disposal Operator in Iraq. Its sequel, Extreme Risk, published in May 2010, charts his journey into bomb disposal.

Hunter has also co-written two teenage novels with children's writer Steve Cole. The first, Tripwire, was published in April 2010, and its sequel, Deathwing, was published in July 2011.
