= Kenneth Hunter (cricketer) =

English cricketer and stockbroker

Personal information
- Full name: Kenneth Owen Hunter
- Born: 7 July 1881; Westminster, London, England
- Died: 25 March 1960 (aged 78); Westminster, London, England
- Batting: Unknown
- Bowling: Unknown

Domestic team information
- Years: Team
- 1905: Marylebone Cricket Club

Career statistics
Competition	First-class
Matches	2
Runs scored	25
Batting average	8.33
100s/50s	–/–
Top score	21
Balls bowled	151
Wickets	6
Bowling average	11.83
5 wickets in innings	1
10 wickets in match	–
Best bowling	5/21
Catches/stumpings	1/–
- Source: Cricinfo, 12 June 2021

Kenneth Owen Hunter (7 July 1881 – 25 March 1960) was an English first-class cricketer and stockbroker.

The son of Robert Lewin Hunter, he was born at Westminster in July 1881. He was educated at Winchester College, before going up to New College, Oxford. After graduating from Oxford, he was commissioned into the Royal Hampshire Regiment as a second lieutenant in September 1903. In 1905, he toured North America with the Marylebone Cricket Club, making two first-class appearances against the Gentlemen of Philadelphia at Germantown and Merion. In the first match at Germantown, he claimed a five wicket haul with his bowling. He claimed one further wicket on the tour, his six wickets coming at an average of 11.83. Hunter later joined the Stock Exchange, in addition to serving as the secretary of the Old Wykehamists Cricket Club for over twenty years and playing for the club until he was 65. He died at Westminster in March 1960.
