= Hunter Johnson =

Hunter Johnson may refer to:

- Hunter Johnson (choreographer), ballroom dancer and choreographer
- Hunter Johnson (composer) (1906–1998), American composer
- J. Hunter Johnson (born 1969), author of GURPS Monsters
- Hunter Johnson (American football) (born 1998), American football player
- Hunter Johnson (actress), actress who appeared as Zoe on Love for Rent
- Hunter Johnson (tennis) (born 1994), American professional tennis and pickleball player
- Hunter Johnson, actor and director of films including 2 Jennifer

== See also ==
- Hunter Johnston or Delirious (born 1981), American professional wrestler
