= Martin Hunter =

Martin Hunter may refer to:

- Martin Hunter (football coach), English football coach
- Martin Hunter (British Army officer) (1757–1846), British Army general
- Martin Hunter (canoeist) (born 1965), Australian sprint canoeist
- Martin Hunter (EastEnders), fictional character in the BBC soap opera EastEnders
- J. Martin Hunter (1937–2021), British lawyer specializing in arbitration
- Martin Hunter (editor), film editor active since the 1980s
