= Geoffrey Hunter =

Geoffrey Hunter may refer to:

- Geoff Hunter (footballer) (1959–2022), English soccer player
- Geoff Hunter (cricketer) (born 1937), English cricketer
- Geoffrey Hunter (logician) (1925–2000), British logician

== See also ==
- Jeffrey Hunter (disambiguation)
