= Allan Hunter (cricketer) =

New Zealand cricketer

- Hunter in 1960

Personal information
- Full name: Allan Arthur Hunter
- Born: 6 March 1926; Nelson, New Zealand
- Died: 31 August 1982 (aged 56); Nelson, New Zealand
- Batting: Right-handed
- Bowling: Slow left-arm orthodox
- Role: Batsman

Domestic team information
- Years: Team
- 1951/52–1956/57: Central Districts

Career statistics
Competition	First-class
Matches	16
Runs scored	752
Batting average	27.85
100s/50s	1/4
Top score	108
Balls bowled	390
Wickets	3
Bowling average	52.66
5 wickets in innings	0
10 wickets in match	0
Best bowling	1/14
Catches/stumpings	5/–
- Source: Cricinfo, 29 December 2017

Allan Arthur Hunter (6 March 1926 – 31 August 1982) was a New Zealand cricketer who played first-class cricket for Central Districts from 1951 to 1956, and Hawke Cup cricket for Nelson from 1950 to 1955.

Hunter was educated at Nelson College in 1940 and 1941. An opening batsman, he scored his only first-class century in his second match: 108 against Otago in 1951–52. He also scored 105 for Central Districts in their two-day match against the touring South Africans in March 1953; he played, unsuccessfully, a week later in the trial match to help the New Zealand selectors choose the team for the tour of South Africa in 1953-54.

He opened the batting for Nelson in the Hawke Cup when they held the title in the early 1950s. He scored 198 in eight hours in the innings victory over Taranaki in December 1952. He was later Nelson's coach and sole selector.
