= Smedley Hydro =

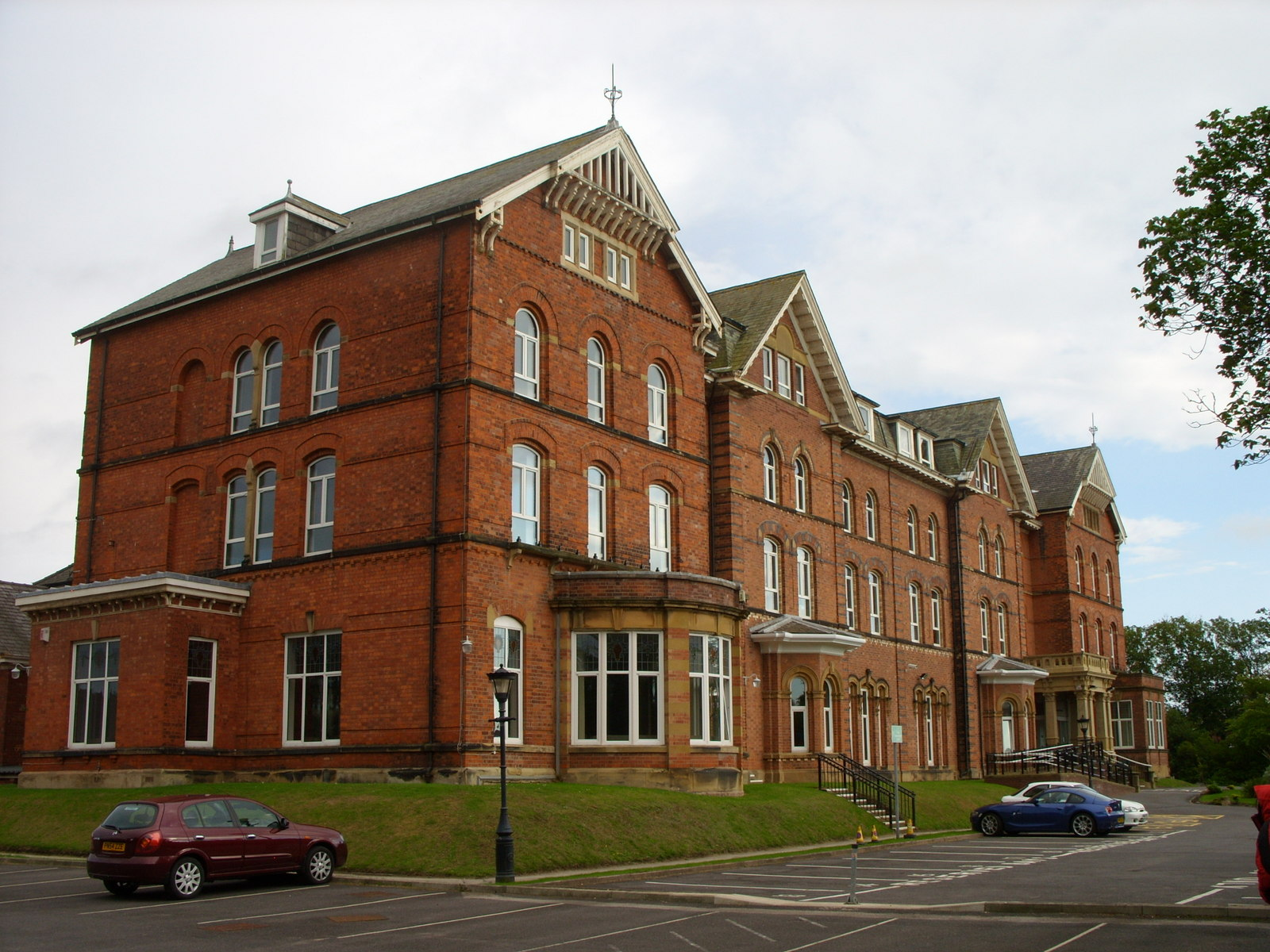

- Location within Southport Location within Merseyside
- Former names: Smedley Hydropathic Spa & Hotel

General information
- Type: Hydropathic Spa & Hotel
- Architectural style: Victorian
- Location: Southport, Trafalgar Road, Birkdale
- Coordinates: 53.6306°N 3.0202°W
- Current tenants: The UK general register office for birth, deaths and marriages
- Completed: 1876
- Renovated: 1940
- Owner: British Government

Technical details
- Structural system: Brick
- Floor count: 5

Smedley Hydro is a former Victorian hydropathic spa and hotel in Birkdale, Southport, Merseyside, England. The building has been used as a college, hydropathic spa, and hotel and is currently the home of the General Register Office for England and Wales.

== History ==
=== Birkdale College ===
Smedley Hydro started out as Birkdale College, with 47 rooms, for the education of young gentlemen.

=== Hotel ===
John Smedley formed the Smedley Hydropathic Company for £25,000 at £5 a share in August 1876. The company purchased the building for £7,500 and extended the building to accommodate 140 visitors as a hotel. The hotel offered luxurious facilities to guests, including a spa which opened on a five-acre site on 1 May 1877, and was the first and only hydropathic hotel in Birkdale and the fourth out of six in Southport to offer hydrotherapy. The resident physician was Dr Barnado. In 1881 the Birkdale Palace Hotel was refurbished and re-opened as a hydropathic spa as a rival to the Smedley. By 1882 the Smedley had two wings added, the west wing having the dining room and the east wing having the drawing room which led to the ballroom.

Between 1924 and 1928, the hotel was closed while the main building had its roof raised to form a third storey and to be in line with the roof of the east and west wings.

In 1932 the hotel became known as the Smedley Hydro Hotel and had Turkish and plunge baths, with all guest rooms having hot and cold running water and either gas or coal fires. The hotel also boasted conservatories, a sun lounge and a ballroom that had a theatre stage and resident dance hostesses.

== World War II ==
In September 1939 the government took over management of the hotel building, turning it into a centre for the registration of the British population. The plan was originally intended only for the duration of World War II. When VE Day came, Smedley Hydro was not returned to its owners, thus the building has not served holidaymakers since 1939.

== Post WWII ==
In 1952 national registration and rationing ended, and it was intended that operations at Smedley Hydro would be wound down. However, the government decided to continue to use the building to handle the administration for the unique identification numbers (now known as NHS numbers) required by the National Health Service.

In 1991 the General Register Office for births, deaths and marriages was relocated from London to the Smedley Hydro site.
