= Charles Hunter (cricketer) =

English cricketer

Charles Herbert Hunter (18 April 1867 – 2 April 1955) was an English cricketer. He played in three first-class cricket matches between 1889 and 1895. He was born in Lee in London in 1867, the son of a wealthy timber merchant.

Hunter was educated at Uppingham School where he played cricket as a wicket-keeper for the school XI. He went up to Cambridge University and played one first-class match for Cambridge University Cricket Club in 1889, suffering somewhat by Gregor MacGregor being a contemporary at both Uppingham and Cambridge. He played club cricket Bickley Park Cricket Club and in 1894 played twice for the Kent Second XI before making two first-team appearances for them in 1895. He continued to play club cricket into the 1900s.

After marrying Euphemia Parke at Quebec City in Canada in 1899, Hunter worked first as a solicitor's clerk before taking over the family timber business. The couple had one son. After retiring to live in Devon, he died at Budleigh Salterton in April 1955 aged 87.

== Bibliography ==
- Carlaw, Derek (2020). Kent County Cricketers, A to Z: Part One (1806–1914) (PDF). Cardiff: ACS.
