= Barry Hunter =

Barry Hunter may refer to:

- Barry Hunter (footballer) (born 1968), former Northern Ireland international footballer
- Barry Hunter (bishop) (1927–2015), Anglican Bishop of Riverina, Australia, 1971–1992
