= J. Robert Hunter =

American actuary and consumer advocate (born 1936)

J. Robert Hunter (born November 20, 1936) is an American consulting actuary and consumer advocate who serves as the director of insurance for the nonprofit Consumer Federation of America (CFA) since 1995. He was the insurance commissioner of the state of Texas from October 1993 to December 1994 and a federal insurance administrator from 1976 to 1980. John Robert Hunter, Jr. was born on November 20, 1936, in New Orleans. His father was a marine insurance adjuster. He went to Clarkson University, Potsdam, NY, and earned his Bachelor of Science in physics in 1958. He is married to Carole A. Means since 1976. They raised three children; Laura Jeanne, James Douglas, and John Robert, III.

== Career ==
=== Early career ===
In 1959, Hunter began his career at Atlantic Mutual Insurance Companies where he spent one year as Underwriter, then joined the National Bureau of Casualty Underwriters (NBCU), an organization of the Insurance Services Office (ISO) where at first he worked in the rate-filing and later became actuarial supervisor. From 1966 to 1970, he was an associate actuary at the Mutual Insurance Rating Bureau (MIRB) and the Mutual Insurance Advisory Association (MIAA).

=== Federal Insurance Administration ===
From 1970 to 1980, Robert Hunter was appointed in multiple positions in the Federal Insurance Administration under the Department of Housing and Urban Development and became a Federal Insurance Administrator in 1974. He directed many nationwide programs such as the National Flood Insurance Program from 1974 to 1978. In 1977, he cut ties with the 132 companies managing flood insurance policies in all states after official reports concluded they were overcharging the government and underpaying homeowners, he subsequently proposed a bid for a single company to manage all policies, which was won by Electronic Data Systems. On the program's changes over four decades, Hunter presented different views that mostly included criticism. During his testimony before a congressional committee in 2006, he said that if the program's maps are not kept updated, the program should be ended.

=== Insurance Commissioner ===
On October 10, 1993, Robert Hunter was appointed as the Insurance Commissioner of the state of Texas by Governor Ann Richards. While he was in office, the department issued fines against more than 60 companies including State Farm, Texas Farm Bureau, Geico, for alleged discrimination in selling automobile insurance, and included a $850,00 fine against Allstate Insurance Group, which was the largest fine ever in the history of the department, then shortly fined MetLife another record $1.2 million fine.

Hunter presented his resignation from the office on December 11, 1994, and his term expired on February 1. Although his resignation came shortly after the defeat of Ann Richards and winning of G. W. Bush as Texas Governor, he said to the press that family reasons were behind his resignation. He was succeeded by Rebecca Lightest.

He was a member of the National Association of Insurance Commissioners in which he served on the executive committee and as the vice-chair, Western Zone of NAIC.

=== 1994-present ===
In 1980, Hunter founded the National Insurance Consumer Organization (NICO) based in Alexandria, Va., a non-profit and non-partisan watchdog group formed to monitor the insurance industry and aims at educating consumers on their interests, he served as its president for thirteen years. In 1995, he folded his work in the NICO into the Consumer Federation of America, an organization that includes 300 consumer-oriented non-profits and seeks to advance the consumer interest through research, advocacy and education, he has been its director of insurance since then.

On many occasions, Hunter was hired as a consultant actuary in issues related to public policy and property/casualty insurance. In February 2007, the Florida Office of Insurance Regulation hired Hunter to set the required property insurance rate reductions in Florida under earlier legislation introduced by Governor Charlie Crist.

Hunter has been often described by the press as a nationwide noted consumer advocate and critic of the insurance industry.

He is a fellow of the Casualty Actuarial Society (CAS), a member of the American Academy of Actuaries and the International Actuarial Association (IAA).

== Awards ==
- Federal Insurance Administration Secretary's Award for Excellent Service.
- Esther Peterson Consumer Service Award for lifetime service, Consumer Federation of America, 2002.
- Schraeder-Nelson Publications award, 2002 and 2007.
