= Alexis Hunter =

New Zealand painter and photographer (1948–2014)

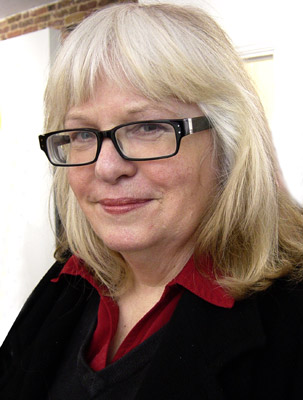
- Born: Alexis Jan Atthill Hunter; 4 November 1948; Auckland, New Zealand
- Died: 24 February 2014 (aged 65); London, England
- Known for: Photography, painting
- Movement: Stuckism
- Spouse: Baxter Mitchell
- Website: alexishuntertrust.org

Alexis Jan Atthill Hunter (4 November 1948 – 24 February 2014) was a New Zealand painter and photographer, who used feminist theory in her work. She lived and worked in London UK, and Beaurainville France. Hunter was also a member of the Stuckism collective. Her archive and artistic legacy is now administered by the Alexis Hunter Trust.

== Early life ==
Hunter's parents emigrated to New Zealand from Sydney in 1947, and she was born in Epsom, Auckland. Her twin sister is the printmaker and photographer Alyson Hunter. Hunter was raised in Titirangi in the Waitākere Ranges in Auckland.

== Education and career ==
From 1966 to 1969, Hunter studied at Elam School of Fine Arts, where she was influenced by a tutor Colin McCahon's ethics that the artist has responsibility as a member of society. In 1970, she lived in a commune in Cairns. In 1971, she completed a teaching diploma in art and history.

In 1972 she moved to London and worked in film animation. She was a member of the Women's Workshop of the Artists Union (1972–1975) and the Woman's Free Arts Alliance. She has said that during this time of her feminist stance, "We were ridiculed in the press. We couldn't get work", and that she also found it difficult to get photo labs to print her work.

She started to study European tattoos, after listening to a lecture at the Royal Academy, which described them in a belittling way; she said, "I was angry because I know from New Zealand culture that tattooing was a very important part of Maori social structure." She took photos in the street of men with tattoos and received sexist accusations, which she rejected.

She used the image of hands in her work. A series, Approach to Fear II: Change – Decisive Action (1977), depicts red nail varnish being taken off and fingernails being cut with a razor blade. Sexual Warfare (1975) is a grid of photographs with text, where her own hands show different methods of killing a male partner, such as a pair of scissors being clutched and the text "Castrate, dedicated to Delilah". Threat and humour combine, and the word "Compete" is hand with the book, How to Make it in a Man's World. Images in the series, The Marxist Housewife (Still Does the Housework) (1978), show a manicured hand cleaning a poster of Karl Marx, referencing both class issues and Marx's lack of recognition of domestic labour in his writing. The series Identity Crisis consists of six photographs of Hunter, each taken by a different person over a two-week period, showing how they saw her, ranging from the feminity of wearing a pearl necklace to a defiant stance wearing a hard hat.

She also photographed men, in common with feminist practice of the 1970s, to reverse the traditional position of men's visualization of women - 'the male gaze'. Her Sexual Rapport series (1972–1976) consists of image of men, whom she had photographed in the street in Hoxton, London and Little Italy in New York: they include workers on lunch break and policemen, who are shown in a friendly and good-natured fashion. Hunter then marked the photographs, "Yes", "No" or "Maybe", to indicate the level of sexual rapport she felt existed with the subjects.

In 1978 her photographic exhibition Approaches to Fear was staged by Sarah Kent, who was then Exhibitions Director at the Institute of Contemporary Arts in London. That year she showed at the Hayward Annual, in 1979 at the Palais des Beaux-Arts, Brussels, and in 1981 at the Summer Show 2 at the Serpentine Gallery, London. She was included in Contemporary Acquisitions (The Imperial War Museum, London, 1981), Mythic Landscapes and Memory Series (Totah Gallery, New York, 1984), Whitechapel Open (Whitechapel Gallery, London, 1987), Alter/Image: Feminism and Representation in New Zealand Art 1973-1993 (City Gallery Wellington and Auckland Art Gallery, 1993–1994), Fantasy (Touring: United Arab Emirates and England, 1994), and Technomyths (Whitespace Gallery, Auckland, New Zealand, 2002). She showed work in group shows at the Stuckism International Gallery in 2003. In an interview with Lisa Sabbage, she explained how she returned to painting in the early 1980s to explore the political difficulties of the medium, using it to examine psychology and fantasy from a feminist perspective.

Photograph by Alexis Hunter from the Sexual Rapport series, early 1970s, used for her 2007 show, Radical Feminism in the 1970s.

A revival of interest in early feminist art led her in 2007 to stage a show of older work, Alexis Hunter: Radical Feminism in the 1970s, shown at the Norwich Gallery, England, and at the Whitespace Gallery in New Zealand. Kathy Battista in Frieze said the show, "situated her practice as an important contribution to Britain's feminist movement within the visual arts." Hunter said:

"In the 1970s we felt empowered to change society, and thought we could do so by making art. People now don't feel that, and they want to learn how we did it.

The black-and-white image used for the exhibition catalogue cover from her 1970s Sexual Rapport series, showed a man's bare torso, wearing leather trousers, with the twin towers of the World Trade Center in the background as the "ultimate phallic symbols", while he holds a smoking cigarette at the level of his penis. The image sums up her "combination of intellectual inquiry into desire and subjectivity, but handled with tongue-in-cheek humour and ease."

In 2007, her work was also included in WACK! Art and the Feminist Revolution Museum of Contemporary Art (MoCA), Los Angeles, and the Stuckist show, I Won't Have Sex with You as long as We're Married, at the A Gallery in London. In 2008, she founded the Camden Stuckist group in Camden, London.

In 2013 her work Approach to Fear XIII: Pain – Destruction of Cause 1977 was purchased by the Tate Gallery.

She lectured at art schools in the United Kingdom and other countries and in 1986 was visiting Associate Professor of Painting and Photography at University of Houston, Texas.

== Personal life ==
Hunter was married to ex-rugby player Baxter Mitchell, and together they owned The Falcon pub in Camden, which supported independent bands such as Blur in the 1980s.

== Legacy ==
The reputation of Alexis Hunter has continued to grow since her death in 2014 through a series of exhibitions and public purchases:

2016/2017 exhibition at Cooper Gallery, Duncan of Jordanstone College of Art and Design, University of Dundee. Of Other Spaces: Where Does Gesture Become Event?

2016 - exhibition at the Museum of New Zealand Te Papa Tongarewa. The Model’s Revenge

2018 - exhibition with publication at Goldsmiths, University of London Sexual Warfare

2020 - two-part exhibition at Richard Saltoun Gallery Alexis Hunter: money, art, sex - part 1 ‘A Goddess Confronting Patriarchy’; part 2 ‘Callisto’

2021 - purchase by the Tate Approach to Fear XVII - ten photographs mounted in two rows on two boards

2022 exhibition The Margate School Passionate Instincts: paintings and boards from New Zealand days 1976 - 1988

2023 - at Kunstverein, Amsterdam ... An Emergency Exit Sealed Shut - photographs by Lou Hubbard and Alexis Hunter

2023 - work in exhibition at the Tate 'Women in Revolt! Art, Activism and the Women's Movement in the UK 1970 - 1990'

2024 - major solo exhibition at Richard Saltoun Gallery ‘Ten Seconds’

== Work in collections ==
Hunter's work is represented in the Tate Modern, Scottish National Gallery of Modern Art, Museum of New Zealand Te Papa Tongarewa, University of Otago and the Arts Council of Great Britain collections.

== Books ==
- Hunter, Alexis (2014). Joi Lansing: A Body to Die For. BearManor Media. ISBN 978-1-59393-798-0.
- Hunter, Alexis; Lippard, Lucy R.; Morris, Lynda; Roberts, John (2006). Alexis Hunter: Radical Feminism in the 1970s. Norwich Gallery, Norwich School of Art and Design. ISBN 978-1-872482-82-8.
- Hunter, Alexis (2003). Myth and Culture: Alexis Hunter at Studio Ceramics. Corban Estate Arts Centre.
- Hunter, Alexis; Graham, Evangeline Riddiford; Rundle, Deborah; Davis, Sophie; Songsataya, Sorawit (2022). Nature Danger Revenge. Dunedin Public Art Gallery. ISBN 978-0-473-65808-3.
- Hunter, Alexis (1969). '69. University of Auckland.

== See also ==
- Sarah Kent
- Mary Kelly
- Lucy Lippard
- Feminist Theory

== General references ==
- Allmer, Patricia (2015) ‘Alexis Hunter’, in The Feminist Avant-Garde of the 1970, ed. Gabriele Schor, SAMMLUNG VERBUND, Vienna/Hamburger Kunsthalle.
