= Jimmy Hunter (New Zealand footballer) =

New Zealand footballer

Personal information
- Full name: James C Hunter
- Date of birth: 28 October 1920
- Place of birth: Port Glasgow, Renfrewshire, Scotland
- Date of death: 14 February 1970 (aged 49)
- Place of death: Heretaunga, Upper Hutt, New Zealand

Youth career
- Arthurlie FC

Senior career*
Years	Team	Apps	(Gls)
1946–1948	Chelsea		
1949–1952	Canterbury City FC		
1953–1955	Mangakino United		
1955–1956	Eastern Union		
1956–1958	Christchurch Technical Old Boys		

International career
1954	New Zealand	3	(0)
- * Club domestic league appearances and goals

Jimmy Hunter was a former professional footballer who represented and captained New Zealand at international level.

Hunter played three official A-international matches for New Zealand in 1954, all against trans-Tasman neighbours Australia, the first a 2–1 win on 14 August, followed by consecutive 1–4 losses on 28 August and 4 September respectively.

Hunter began his football at Arthurlie F.C. in Scotland before being recruited by Chelsea Hunter played for Canterbury City F.C. of Kent, England before moving to New Zealand where he played for Mangakino. Hunter was also selected to represent the North Island in 1953 and 1954.

In 1955 Hunter transferred to Eastern Union of Gisborne, and in 1956 moved to the South Island to play for Christchurch Technical Old Boys.

Hunter retired from playing in 1958, continuing as a selector for Technical Old Boys.
