= Tim Hunter =

Tim Hunter may refer to:

- Tim Hunter (astronomer), American radiologist and amateur astronomer
- Tim Hunter (director) (born 1947), American television and film director
- Tim Hunter (ice hockey) (born 1960), Canadian ice hockey player
- Tim Hunter (soccer) (born 1955), Canadian-American soccer player
- Tim Hunter (DC Comics), a fictional character in the DC Comics miniseries The Books of Magic
