= Lissa Hunter =

American artist (born 1945)

- Born: November 13, 1945 (age 80); Indianapolis, Indiana, U.S.
- Education: Indiana University Bloomington
- Occupation: Artist

Lissa Hunter (born November 13, 1945) is an American artist known for her basketry, drawing and mixed media work. Her professional activities include teaching, writing, and a long association with Haystack Mountain School of Crafts in Deer Isle, Maine as teacher, student and trustee.

== Early life ==
Hunter was born in Indianapolis, Indiana, to C. McCord Purdy, salesman and magician, and Ruth Gordon Purdy, secretary and untrained artist. She attended Indiana University Bloomington, where she studied drawing and painting, attaining the BA degree in 1967, and the MFA degree in Textiles in 1971.

== Professional practice ==
After having taught at Mansfield State College (now Mansfield University) in Mansfield, Pennsylvania, from 1971 to 1978, Hunter left Pennsylvania to work as a full-time artist, living in South Berwick, Maine. At the time, she was weaving tapestries but was soon drawn to the burgeoning fields of papermaking and basketry. It was at this time that she developed her own technique of applying paper to her coiled baskets as well as making collages of painted and stitched paper and fabric. Hunter continued these two paths after moving to Portland, Maine, in 1984. In 1994, she merged the two-dimensional and three-dimensional imagery into wall-mounted sculptures that remain her trademark work. While she continues in this vein, Hunter also explores drawing, painting and printmaking. She also teaches workshops and writes as a complementary part of her professional life.

== Gallery ==
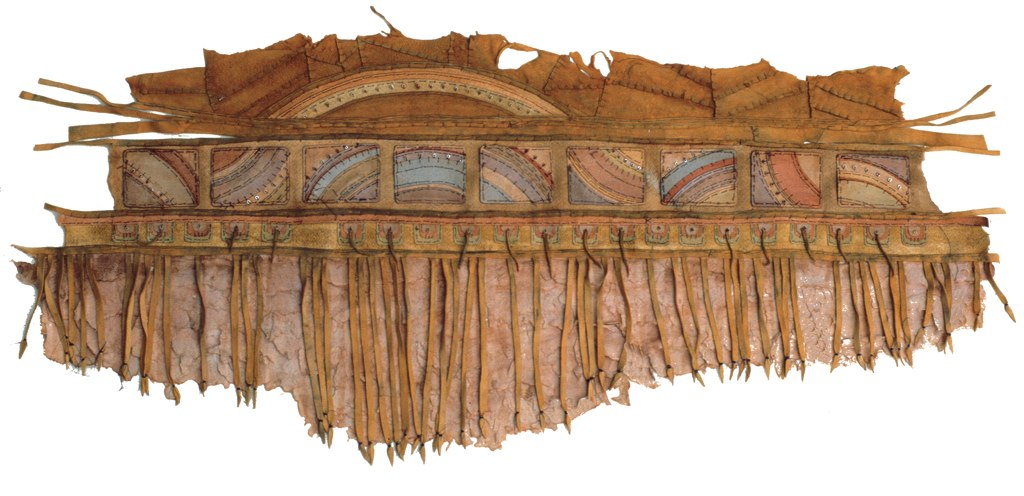
Cycles 1981 15" h x 30" w x 1" d

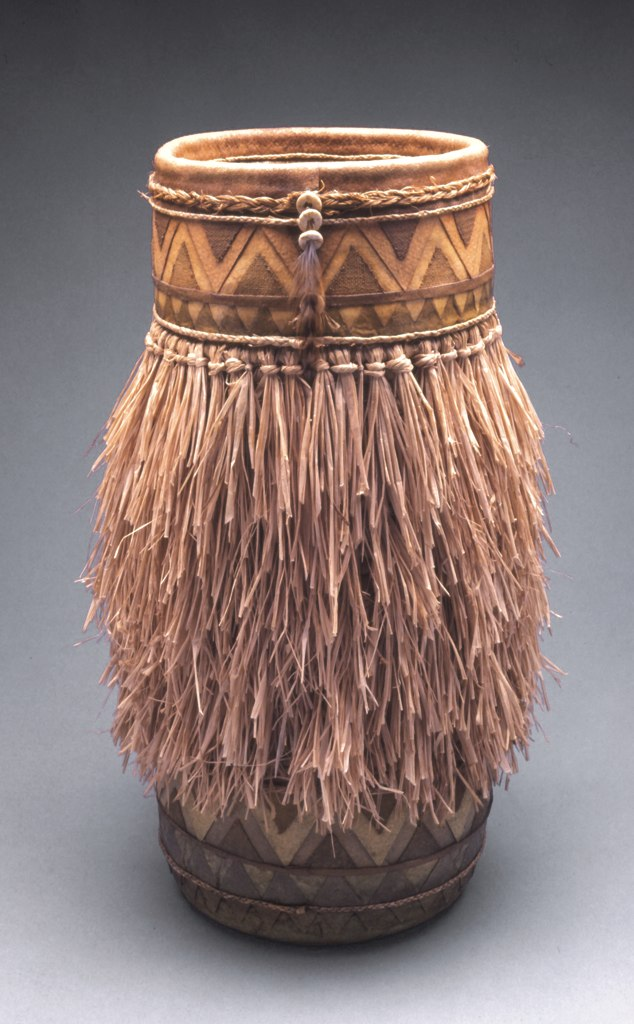
Thatch Basket 1984 8" diameter x 15" h

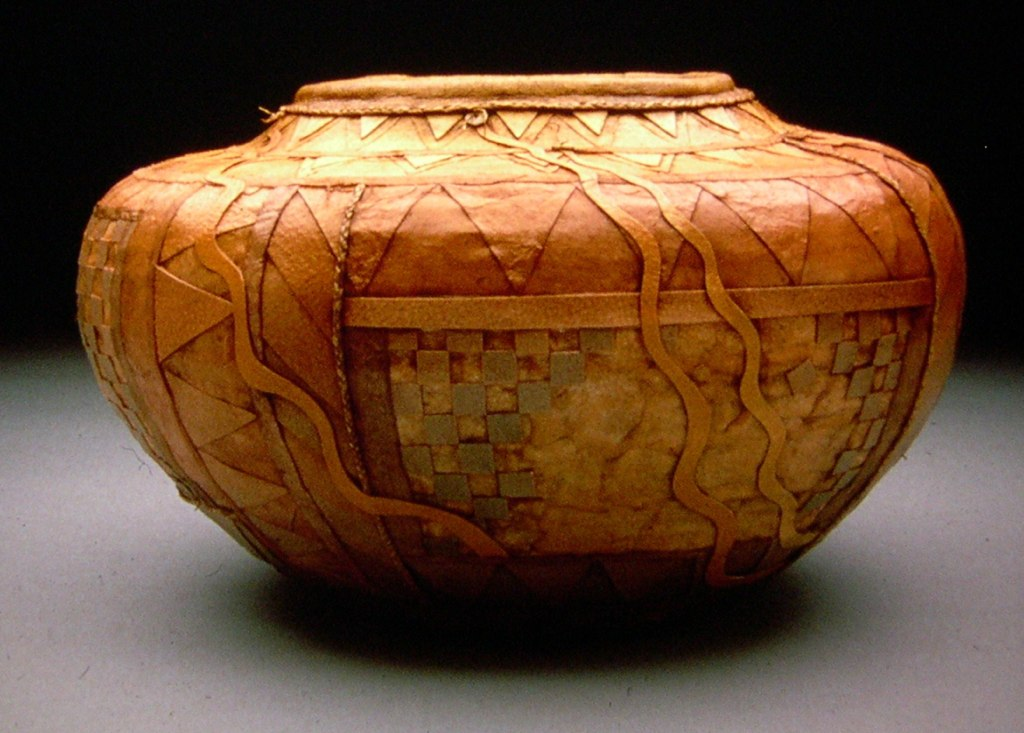
Santa Fe Basket 1988 17" diameter x 9 1/4" h

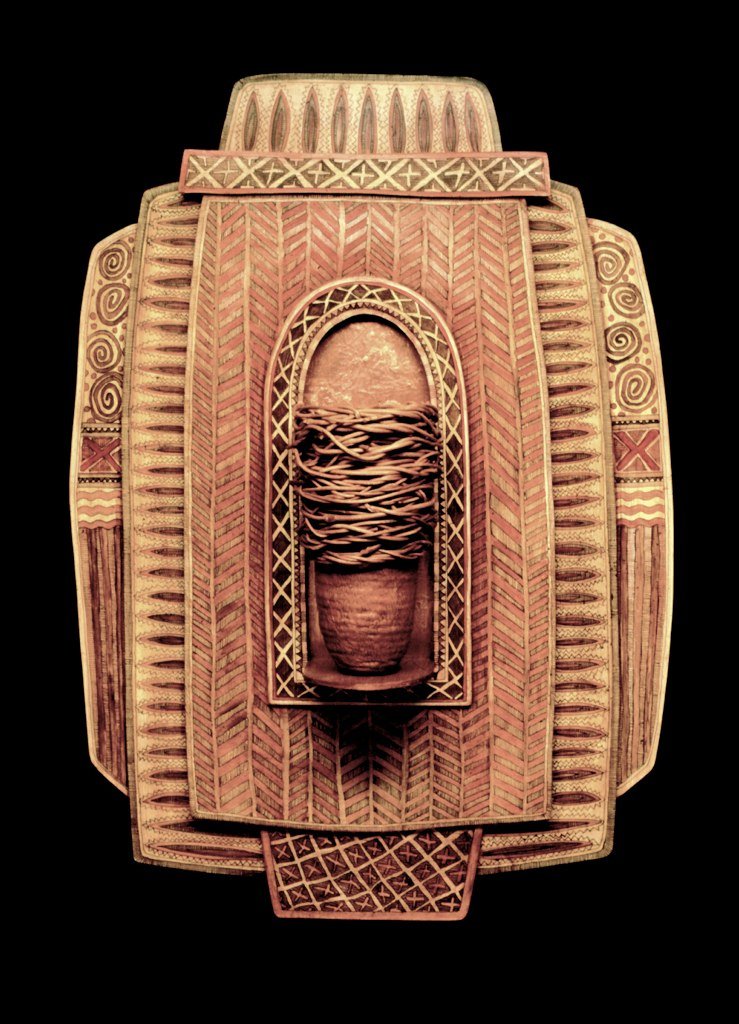
Transition 1993 32"h x 26" w x 5" d

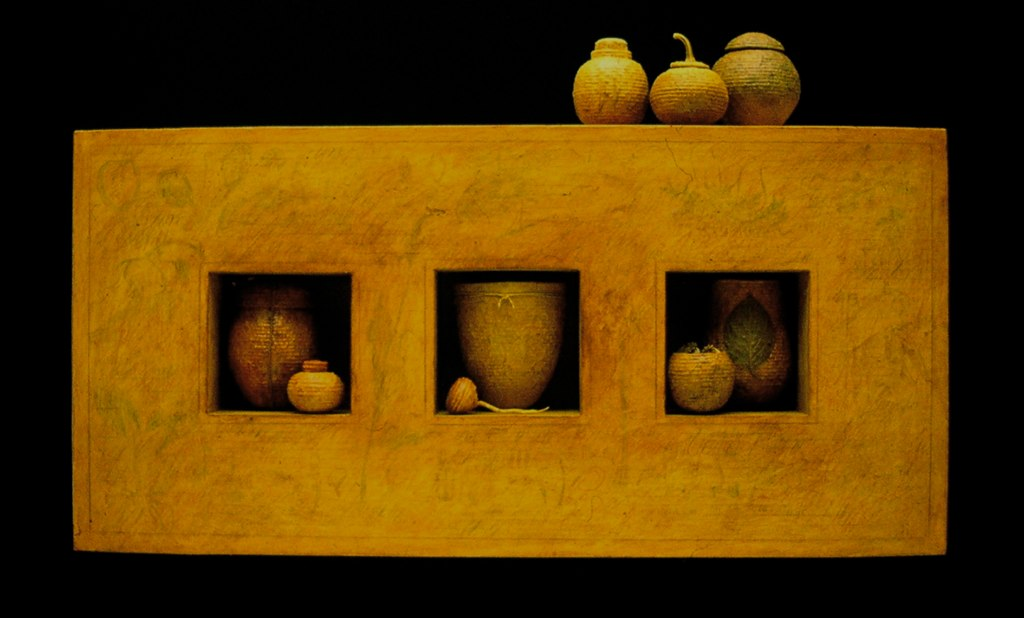
Botanica 2001 19" h x 31" w x 4" d

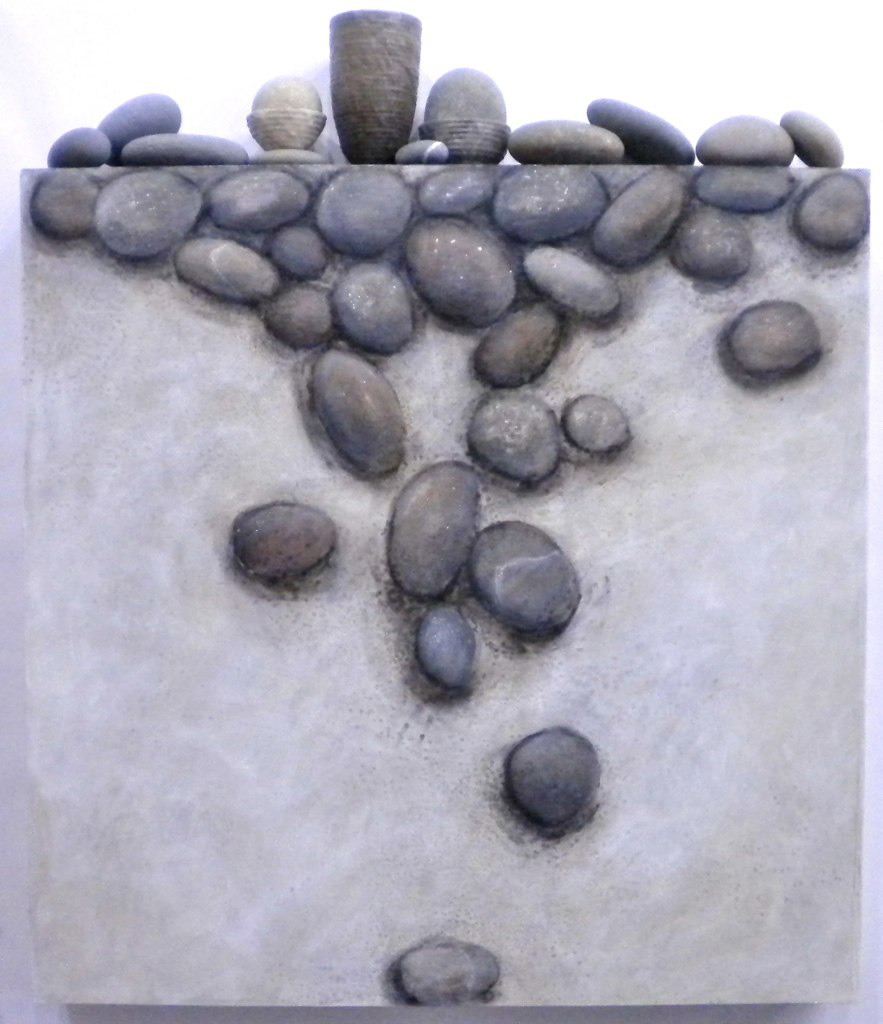
Tumbled 2010 29" h x 24" w x 3" d

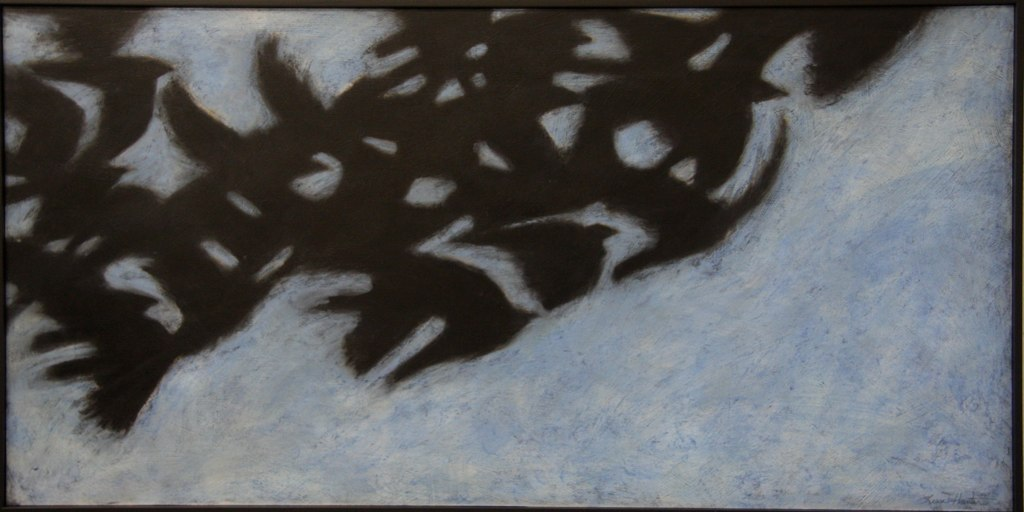
Morning Rush 2011 25" h x 49" w x 2" d

== Collections ==
- Museum of Art and Design, New York City
- Museum of Fine Arts, Boston, Massachusetts
- Smithsonian American Art Museum, Renwick Gallery, Washington D.C.
- The Racine Art Museum, Racine, Wisconsin
- Houston Museum of Fine Arts, Houston, Texas
- The Arkansas Arts Center, Little Rock, Arkansas
- The Albuquerque Museum, Albuquerque, New Mexico
