= Paul Hunter (disambiguation) =

Paul Hunter (1978–2006) was an English snooker player.

Paul Hunter may also refer to:

- Paul Hunter (soccer, born 1956), Canadian soccer player, who played predominantly in the United States
- Paul Hunter (Scottish footballer) (born 1968)
- Paul Hunter (Australian footballer) (born 1993), Australian rules footballer
- Paul Hunter (microbiologist) (fl. 1980s–), professor of medicine at the University of East Anglia
- Paul Hunter (director) (fl. 1990s–), American music video director
- Paul Hunter (journalist) (fl. 1990s–), Canadian journalist
- Paul M. Hunter, co-founder of Hunter Industries
- Paul M. Hunter (1890–1944), American amateur golfer
- Paul Hunter, co-founder of Told by an Idiot

== Fictional ==
- Paul Hunter (River City), a character on River City

== See also ==
- Paul Hunter Classic, a minor-ranking snooker tournament
- Paul Hunter Peckham, biomedical engineer
