= Henry Hunter (RAF officer) =

Royal Air Force officer (1893–1966)

Henry John Francis Hunter
- Born: 29 December 1893; London, England
- Died: 12 September 1966 (aged 72); Exeter, Devon, England
- Relatives: Thomas Vicars Hunter (brother)
- Military career
- Allegiance: United Kingdom
- Branch: British Army; Royal Air Force
- Service years: 1914–1946
- Rank: Air Commodore
- Unit: Rifle Brigade (Prince Consort's Own)
- Commands: No. 9 Squadron RFC; No. 42 Squadron RAF; No. 105 Squadron RAF; School of Army Co-operation, Old Sarum; No. 12 Squadron RAF; Aircraft Depot, Hinaidi, Iraq; RAF Finningley; No. 225 (Bomber) Group; No. 221 (Bomber) Group; No. 223 (Composite) Group
- Conflicts: World War I World War II
- Awards: Order of the British Empire; Military Cross; 4 × Mentioned in Despatches

Air Commodore Henry John Francis Hunter CBE, MC (29 December 1893 – 12 September 1966) was a pilot and squadron commander in the Royal Flying Corps during World War I, and later a senior officer in the Royal Air Force during World War II.

== Biography ==
=== Family background and education ===
Hunter was the older of the two sons of Henry Charles Vicars Hunter, JP, and the Honourable Florence Edith Louise (née Dormer), daughter of John Baptist Joseph Dormer, 12th Baron Dormer of Wyng. His father was the principal landowner in Kilburn, Derbyshire, but lived at Abermarlais Park, Llangadog, Carmarthenshire. His younger brother Thomas Vicars Hunter also served in the Rifle Brigade and Royal Flying Corps during World War I, but was killed in 1917.

=== World War I ===
After passing out from the Royal Military College, Sandhurst, Hunter was commissioned as a second lieutenant in the Rifle Brigade (Prince Consort's Own) on 5 February 1913. He was promoted to lieutenant on 27 November 1914, and to captain on 8 December 1915.

Hunter was wounded in 1915 and, following his recovery, was seconded to the Royal Flying Corps later in the year. He was granted Royal Aero Club Aviators' Certificate No. 2872 on 9 May 1916, and was appointed a flying officer on 24 May 1916. On 17 October 1916 he was appointed a flight commander with the acting rank of captain.

He was awarded the Military Cross, which was gazetted on 20 October 1916. His citation read:

Captain Henry John Francis Hunter, Rifle Brigade, and Royal Flying Corps.

"For conspicuous gallantry and skill. He has done fine work for the artillery and has accounted for many enemy guns. On one occasion, when a heavy storm drove all other machines back to their aerodromes, and the enemy guns took the opportunity to become active, he remained up and did fine work."

On 1 June 1917 he was appointed squadron commander, with the acting rank of major, of No. 9 Squadron RFC, flying the R.E.8 in France. He received a mention in despatches on 7 November 1917. On 1 April 1918, the Army's Royal Flying Corps (RFC) and the Royal Naval Air Service (RNAS) were merged to form the Royal Air Force, and Hunter was transferred to the RAF with the rank of captain (acting-major). On 17 April he was appointed commander of No. 42 Squadron RAF, another R.E.8 squadron in France.

=== Inter-war career ===
On 15 January 1919 Hunter was appointed to command of No. 105 Squadron RAF, a Bristol F.2 Fighter reconnaissance squadron based in Omagh, Northern Ireland. On 11 July he received another mention in despatches. He served as the commander of the School of Army Co-operation at Old Sarum from 25 July, and on 1 August resigned his commission in the Rifle Brigade after being awarded a permanent commission as a major in the RAF. A year later, on 1 August 1919, when the RAF adopted its own rank system, Major Hunter became Squadron Leader Hunter.

On 1 March 1921 he was appointed Officer Commanding, No. 12 Squadron RAF part of the Army of Occupation in Germany, based at Bickendorf. He was posted to the RAF Depot at Uxbridge as a supernumerary on 25 May 1922, before attending a course at the Senior Officers' School, Woking, from 26 May to 18 August. On 19 September 1922 he was transferred from the RAF Depot (Inland Area) to the Headquarters of No. 10 Group (Coastal Area) for personnel staff duties. Hunter was transferred to the staff of the RAF Training Base at Leuchars on 8 November 1925, receiving promotion to wing commander on 1 January 1926.

Hunter attended the Royal Naval War College from 14 March 1927, and from 3 January 1928 was Officer Commanding, Flying, aboard the carrier HMS Hermes. From 10 November 1928 Hunter was once again a supernumerary at the RAF Depot at Uxbridge, pending a posting. From 21 January 1929 he attended a staff course at the RAF Staff College, Andover, and on 14 December 1929 he was posted to No. 1 (Apprentices) Wing at the No. 1 School of Technical Training, RAF Halton, for administrative duties. Hunter was promoted to group captain on 1 January 1933.

From 6 February 1933 to 16 April 1934 he served as Senior Air Staff Officer, HQ Fighting Area, Uxbridge, and served as the commander of the Aircraft Depot at Hinaidi, Iraq, for two years, from 11 November 1934. After serving as the station commander of RAF Finningley from 2 February 1937, Hunter was retired from the RAF at own request on 15 June 1939.

=== World War II ===
Hunter was recalled to duty on 26 September 1939 to serve in Bomber Command, and was made a commander of the Order of the British Empire on 24 September 1941. On 30 January 1942 Hunter was appointed Air Officer Commanding, No. 225 (Bomber) Group in southern Sumatra, operating from an airfield at Prabumulih, codenamed "P2", in a vain attempt to stem the Japanese advance. However, despite some local successes, the ABDACOM forces were soon overwhelmed, and following the Battle of Palembang all Allied personnel were evacuated from the island by 16 February. From 20 April 1942 to 1 May 1943 Hunter served as AOC, No. 221 (Bomber) Group, later No. 221 (Tactical) Group, then from 1 May 1943 to 5 October 1944 as AOC, No. 223 (Composite) Group, both based in India. Hunter received his third mention in despatches on 2 June 1943, and his fourth on 14 January 1944.

After the end of the war, on 18 January 1946, Hunter reverted to the retired list, retaining the rank of Air Commodore. He died in Exeter, Devon, on 12 September 1966.

== Personal life ==
Hunter married the Honourable Mrs. Pearson, widow of the Hon. Geoffrey Pearson, on 11 April 1918.

== Sporting activities ==
Hunter was also a keen tennis player, competing at Wimbledon in the men's singles in 1924, 1927 and 1930. He was beaten in the first round in the first and third of these, but in 1927 defeated Anthony Wass Buzzard to progress to the second round, where he was beaten in straight sets by the French champion Jacques Brugnon. He also competed at Monte Carlo in 1928, but again did not progress through from the first round, being beaten by the Czech Friedrich Rohrer, who had represented his country at the 1924 Olympics.

He fared better against his fellow officers, reaching the final of the RAF Singles Championship in 1925, only to be beaten by the title holder Flying Officer Charles Frederick Roupell. In 1930 he made it through to the third round. However he had the consolation of being RAF Doubles Champion, partnered with Squadron Leader Richard Saul, for several years.
