= Bruce Hunter =

Bruce Hunter may refer to:

- Bruce Hunter (poet) (born 1952), Canadian poet, novelist and teacher
- Bruce Hunter (politician) (born 1955), Iowa State Representative
- Bruce Hunter (actor) (born 1961), Canadian actor and comedian
- Bruce Hunter (swimmer) (1939–2018), American swimmer
- Bruce Hunter (rugby union) (born 1950), New Zealand rugby union player
