= Humphrey Hunter =

Scottish footballer (1916–1987)

Personal information
- Full name: Humphrey Goudie Hunter
- Date of birth: 13 March 1916
- Place of birth: Paisley, Scotland
- Date of death: 1987 (aged 71)
- Place of death: Dundee, Scotland
- Position: Outside right

Senior career*
Years	Team	Apps	(Gls)
1938–1940	Queen's Park	33	(2)

International career
1939	Scotland Amateurs	1	(0)
- * Club domestic league appearances and goals

Humphrey Goudie Hunter (13 March 1916 – 1987) was a Scottish amateur footballer who played as an outside right in the Scottish League for Queen's Park. He was capped by Scotland at amateur level.
