= Thomas Hunter (RFC officer) =

British World War I flying ace (1897–1917)

Thomas Vicars Hunter
- Born: 2 April 1897; London, England
- Died: 5 December 1917 (aged 20); Italy
- Burial place: Carmignano di Brenta Communal Cemetery, Padua; 45°38′00″N 11°42′00″E
- Relatives: Henry Hunter (brother)
- Military career
- Allegiance: United Kingdom
- Branch: British Army
- Service years: 1914–1917
- Rank: Captain
- Nickname: Sticky
- Units: Rifle Brigade (Prince Consort's Own); No. 66 Squadron RFC
- Conflicts: World War I • Western Front • Italian Front

Captain Thomas Vicars Hunter (2 April 1897 – 5 December 1917) was a British First World War flying ace credited with five aerial victories. While serving in the Rifle Brigade he had a leg amputated following a motorcycle accident; he was the first known military pilot to qualify and fly in combat despite his disability.

== Biography ==
=== Family background and education ===
Hunter was born in London, the younger of the two sons (Note: His older brother Henry also served in the Rifle Brigade and Royal Flying Corps during World War I, but remained in the Royal Air Force afterwards, and later served in World War II, before retiring with the rank of air commodore in 1946.) of Henry Charles Vicars Hunter, JP, and the Honourable Florence Edith Louise (née Dormer), daughter of John Baptist Joseph Dormer, 12th Baron Dormer of Wyng. His father was the principal landowner in Kilburn, Derbyshire, but lived at Abermarlais Park, Llangadog, Carmarthenshire. Hunter was educated at Ladycross School and Eton College.

=== World War I ===
Hunter left Eton on the outbreak of the war in August 1914, to attend the Royal Military College, Sandhurst as a cadet, and was commissioned as a second lieutenant in the Rifle Brigade (Prince Consort's Own) on 23 December 1914. In January 1915, Hunter broke his leg in a motorcycling accident, developed sepsis in hospital, and eventually had to have his leg amputated above the knee in July. He was fitted with a prosthesis, from which he derived his nickname "Sticky" – he was known to remove it during rowdy parties to keep it whole. Hunter was placed on half-pay on account of his injuries on 9 February 1916. He was later assigned to duty at the War Office, but was eventually passed fit for home service, rejoining his regiment on 30 September, with the rank of lieutenant, with seniority from 2 March.

Hunter transferred to the Royal Flying Corps in February 1917, receiving Royal Aero Club Aviator's Certificate No. 4516 on 18 April, and being appointed a flying officer on 9 May. He was posted to No. 66 Squadron RFC for front-line service in France from 2 June. Flying a Sopwith Pup, Hunter gained his first victory on 12 July, driving down out of control an Albatros D.III north-east of Ypres. On 27 and 28 July he accounted for two more D.IIIs, over Ardooie and east of Roeselare. He was promoted to captain in the Rifle Brigade on 31 July. On 3 September he gained his fourth victory, driving down an Albatros D.V out of control north-east of Menen. He was appointed a flight commander with the temporary rank of captain on 30 September, and gained his fifth and final victory on 8 November, driving down another D.V., his squadron by then having been re-equipped with the Sopwith Camel.

No. 66 Squadron was then reassigned to the Italian Front, travelling via the French Riviera, Nice, and Monte Carlo, before arriving at Milan. On 5 December 1917 Hunter took "C" flight out on its first combat patrol. While flying along the front line at around 10,000 feet (3,000 m) Hunter made a left turn, and according to his wingman, Richard W. Ryan:

"...I immediately throttled my engine fully back in order to hold my position in the turn. However, the turn had been too sharp and I lost sight of him as he turned under me. In a Camel you cannot see objects directly below you. My aircraft was in an almost stalled position and I expected to see him coming out of the turn to the left of my aircraft. In that moment our two aircraft collided".

Locked together, the aircraft descended in a slow spin, until finally separating at 5,000 feet (1,500 m). Ryan was able to make an emergency landing, suffering from some minor injuries and shock, but Hunter crashed and was killed. He is buried in the communal cemetery in Carmignano di Brenta, Padua, Italy.
