= Charles Hunter =

Charles Hunter may refer to:

- Charles Hunter (athlete) (1892–1974), American Olympic athlete
- Charles Hunter (composer) (1876–1906), American composer of ragtime music
- Charles A. Hunter (1843–1912), American Civil War soldier awarded the Medal of Honor
- Charles Norfleet Hunter (1853?–1931), Black educator, journalist, and historian
- Charles Newton Hunter (1906–1978), U.S. Army officer and author
- Sir Charles Hunter, 3rd Baronet (1858–1924), member of parliament for Bath, 1910–1918
- Charles H. Hunter (soldier) (1817–1870), Pennsylvania militia officer and physician
- Charles Hunter (physician) (1835–1878), doctor who coined the term "hypodermic" and conducted research into narcotic injections
- Charles Hunter (cricketer) (1867–1955), English cricketer
- Charlie Hunter (golfer) (Charles Crawford Hunter, 1836–1921), Scottish golfer
- Charlie Hunter (runner) (Charles Hunter, born 1996), Australian middle-distance runner
- Charles Hunter, a character in the novel Pirate Latitudes

== See also ==
- Charlie Hunter (born 1967), American guitarist, composer and bandleader
- Charlie Hunter (trainer), trainer and driver of standardbred racehorses in New Zealand
- Chuck Hunter, member of the Montana House of Representatives
