= Tom Hunter (golfer) =

Scottish golfer

Personal information
- Full name: Thomas Hunter
- Nationality: Scotland
- Born: c. 1843 Scotland

Career
- Sport: Golf
- Status: Professional

Best results in major championships
- Masters Tournament: DNP
- PGA Championship: DNP
- U.S. Open: DNP
- The Open Championship: T8: 1867

Tom Hunter (born c. 1843) was a Scottish professional golfer. Hunter tied for eighth place in the 1867 Open Championship.

== Early life ==
Hunter was born in Scotland circa 1843.

== Golf career ==
=== 1867 Open Championship ===
The 1867 Open Championship was held on 26 September at Prestwick Golf Club. Tom Morris, Sr. won the championship for the fourth time, by two shots from Willie Park, Sr. Tom Morris, Sr. was 46 years old and remains the oldest Open Championship winner.

==== Details of play ====
For the first time an amateur, William Doleman, led after a first round of 55, a stroke ahead of Robert Andrew. Doleman had a second round 66 and dropped out of contention. Tom Morris, after a round of 54, went into the lead with Willie Park and Robert Andrew two shots behind. Andrew had a final round of 65 to drop him out of the prize money. Andrew Strath had the best final round of 56 to finish third, while young Tom Morris, son of Tom Morris, Sr., finished with prize money for the first time. Hunter posted rounds of 62-60-62=184 and tied for eighth place with Willie Dow.

== Death ==
Hunter's date of death is unknown.
