= Ian Hunter (Scottish footballer) =

Scottish footballer

Personal information
- Full name: John Hunter
- Date of birth: c. 1940 (age 85–86)
- Position: Left back

Youth career
- Gairdoch Juveniles

Senior career*
Years	Team	Apps	(Gls)
1958–1969	Falkirk	244	(6)
–	Stenhousemuir		
- * Club domestic league appearances and goals

John "Ian" Hunter is a Scottish former footballer who played mainly as a left back, primarily for Falkirk where he played for a decade, with his colleague at right-back typically being John Lambie.

There was another Ian Hunter who also played briefly for Falkirk in the same period, but was more closely associated with Dunfermline Athletic.
