= Adam Hunter =

Adam Hunter may refer to:

- Adz Hunter (born 1982), Australian actor also known as Adam Hunter
- Adam Hunter (golfer) (1963–2011), Scottish golfer
- Adam Hunter (politician) (1908–1991), British Labour politician, Member of Parliament for Dunfermline 1964–1979
- Adam Hunter (footballer) (1981–2025), Australian Football League player for the West Coast Eagles
- Adam Mitchell Hunter (1871–1955), Scottish minister, mathematician, astronomer and author of church history
- Adam Hunter, a video game character
