= Frank Hunter =

Frank Hunter may refer to:

- Frank Baldwin Hunter, architect and pool designer in Indianapolis who also served as the city's architect
- Frank O'Driscoll Hunter (1894–1982), United States Air Force general
- Frank Hunter (rugby union) (1858–1930), Scottish rugby player
- Frank Hunter (musician) (1919–2005), American musician and arranger
- Frank Hunter (photographer), American photographer and university educator
- Francis Hunter (1894–1981), American tennis player
