= Zach Hunter =

American activist

Zach Hunter (born 1991) is an author and anti-slavery activist. When he was 12 years old, he launched Loose Change to Loosen Chains, a student-led effort to raise awareness and funds to end slavery. Hunter is the author of four books, Be the Change, Generation Change, Lose Your Cool, and Chivalry. Born in Washington state, Hunter resides in Colorado Springs, Colorado.

== Inspiration ==
When asked why he got involved as an abolitionist at a young age, Hunter said "There are actually 27 million slaves in the world. I was really surprised to find that out," he said. "And I had all these emotions about it and I wasn't sure what to think about the idea of having modern slavery, you know. But I didn't think it was enough to just have emotions." Hunter took his emotions of anger and outrage and launched Loose Change to Loosen Chains. Through the campaign, students tell stories of modern-day slaves and collect loose change in yellow cups. The collected change is then used to help fund the work of abolitionist organizations such as Free the Slaves and International Justice Mission; educate and inspire other abolitionists and further the student-led effort.

Hunter cites Dr. Martin Luther King Jr.'s peaceful revolution, the work of Harriet Tubman and Frederick Douglass as some of his inspiration. But foremost among his inspiration was William Wilberforce, the slavery abolitionist in England who lived almost 200 years ago. Wilberforce was a devout Christian and knew John Newton, the slave trader who wrote the hymn, 'Amazing Grace.'

== Ongoing work ==
Hunter speaks around the world to students, youth workers and activists. In addition to his published books, he is a frequent contributor to print and online periodicals including The Huffington Post. His most recent book is Chivalry which was released in July 2013.
