= Alan Hunter (Australian rules footballer) =

Australian rules footballer

Personal information
- Full name: Alan Hunter
- Born: 11 January 1944 (age 82)
- Original team: Western Brisbane
- Height: 185 cm (6 ft 1 in)
- Weight: 79 kg (174 lb)

Playing career^{1}
Years	Club	Games (Goals)
1964–1967	Footscray	15 (8)
- ^{1} Playing statistics correct to the end of 1967.

Alan Hunter (born 11 January 1944) is a former Australian rules footballer who played for the Footscray Football Club in the Victorian Football League (VFL).
