= Peter Hunter =

Peter Hunter may refer to:

- Peter Hunter (British Army officer) (1746–1805), British Army officer and colonial administrator
- Peter Hay Hunter, minister of the Church of Scotland and author
- Peter Hunter (bioengineer), recipient of the Rutherford Medal (Royal Society of New Zealand)

== See also ==
- Pete Hunter, American football defensive back
