= Alex Hunter (economist) =

Scottish-Australian economist and academic (1919–1971)

Alexander Hunter (23 December 1919 – 21 May 1971) was a Scottish-Australian industrial economist. He arrived in Australia in 1958 after being appointed a senior lecturer at the University of Melbourne. He then gained prominence as the editor of The Economics of Australian Industry. He became a professor of economics at the University of New South Wales in 1961, then moving to the Australian National University in 1965. He was a member of the editorial board of the Bulletin of Indonesian Economic Studies. He was married to Thelma Anna Carmela Cibelli and had three children. Hunter died of a coronary occlusion during a visit to Lae, Papua New Guinea, and was cremated.
