= Alex Hunter (footballer) =

Scottish footballer

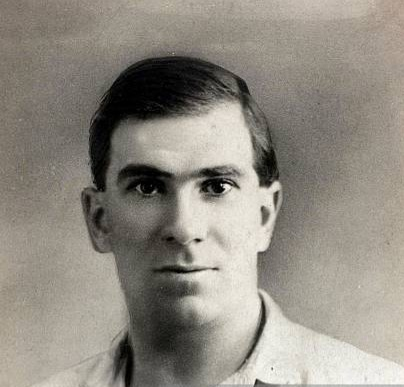

Personal information
- Full name: Alexander Campbell Hunter
- Date of birth: 27 September 1895
- Place of birth: Renfrew, Scotland
- Date of death: January 1984 (aged 88)
- Place of death: New York City, USA
- Height: 5 ft 9 1/2 in (1.77 m)
- Position: Goalkeeper

Senior career*
Years	Team	Apps	(Gls)
1918–1920	Renfrew		
1918–1920	Queen's Park	63	(0)
1920–1922	Tottenham Hotspur	23	(0)
1922–1924	Wigan Borough	39	(0)
1924–1925	Armadale	19	(0)
1925–1930	New Bedford Whalers	?	(?)
- * Club domestic league appearances and goals

Alexander Campbell Hunter (27 September 1895 – January 1984) was a Scottish professional footballer who played as a goalkeeper for Queen's Park, Tottenham Hotspur, Wigan Borough and New Bedford Whalers.

== Football career ==
Born in Renfrew, Hunter began his career with local club Renfrew Juniors before joining Queens Park. He joined Tottenham Hotspur and was a member of the 1921 FA Cup Final-winning side. Hunter featured in 26 matches in all competitions for the Lilywhites. After leaving White Hart Lane in 1922 he moved on to Wigan Borough, where he played in a further 39 games. Hunter briefly returned to Scotland to play for Armadale before ending his career with American Soccer League team New Bedford Whalers.

== Honours ==
Tottenham Hotspur

- FA Cup: 1920–21
