= Al Hunter =

Al Hunter may refer to:

- Al Hunter (writer), Anishinaabe writer
- Al Hunter (American football) (Alfonse Hunter, born 1955), American football player
- Al Hunter (singer) (Alan Keith Hunter), New Zealand singer-songwriter

== See also ==
- Al Hunter Ashton (1957–2007), British actor and script writer
- Albert Hunter (1900–1969), British politician
- Alan Hunter (disambiguation)
