= Hunter (given name) =

- Pronunciation: /ˈhʌntər/ HUN-tər
- Gender: Unisex (usually male)
- Language: English

Origin
- Language: Old English
- Origin: Hunter (surname)
- Meaning: "Hunter" or "Pursuer"
- Region of origin: England, Scotland

Other names
- Related names: Hunt

Hunter is an English unisex given name.

Notable people with the name include:

== People ==
- Hunter Abbott (born 1980), British racing driver and businessman
- Hunter Andrews (1921–2005), American politician
- Hunter Armstrong (born 2001), American swimmer
- Hunter Azure (born 1992), American mixed martial artist
- Hunter Biden (born 1970), American lawyer and son of American president Joe Biden
- Hunter Bishop (born 1998), American baseball player
- Hunter Bradley (born 1994), American football player
- Hunter Bryant (born 1998), American football player
- Hunter Burgan (born 1976), American bassist
- Hunter Campbell, American lawyer and businessman
- Hunter Carpenter (1883–1953), American football player
- Hunter Davies (born 1936), British writer
- Hunter Dekkers (born 2001), American football player
- Hunter Dickinson (born 2000), American basketball player
- Hunter Dobbins (born 1999), American baseball player
- Hunter Doohan (born 1994), American actor
- Hunter Foster (born 1969), American actor
- Hunter J. Francois (1924–2014), Saint Lucian politician
- Hunter Freeman (born 1985), American soccer player
- Hunter Gomez (born 1991), American actor
- Hunter Greene (born 1999), American baseball player
- Hunter Greene, American basketball player
- Hunter Hackett, American politician
- Hunter Haight (born 2004), Canadian ice hockey player
- Hunter Hayes (born 1991), American country music singer
- Hunter Hearst Helmsley (born 1969), ring name of American wrestler Paul Levesque
- Hunter Hess (born 1998), American freestyle skier
- Hunter Hillenmeyer (born 1980), American football player
- Hunter Johnson (disambiguation), multiple people
- Hunter Kampmoyer (born 1998), American football player
- Hunter King (born 1993), American actress
- Hunter Lewis (born 1947), American economist
- Hunter Liggett (1857–1935), American general
- Hunter Long (born 1998), American football player
- Hunter Lovins (born 1950), American author, educator and promoter
- Hunter Luepke (born 2000), American football player
- Hunter Mahan (born 1982), American golfer
- Hunter McGuire (1835–1900), American physician
- Hunter Meighan (1914–2008), American politician
- Hunter Mense (born 1984), American baseball coach
- Hunter Moore (born 1986), American revenge porn hacker and convicted felon
- Hunter Niswander (born 1994), American football player
- Hunter Nourzad (born 2000), American football player
- Hunter Pitts O'Dell (1923–2019), American activist
- Hunter Parrish (born 1987), American actor
- Hunter Pence (born 1983), American baseball player
- Hunter Renfrow (born 1995), American football player
- Hunter Reynolds (1959–2022), American visual artist and AIDS activist
- Hunter Rouse (1906–1996), American physicist
- Hunter Sallis (born 2003), American basketball player
- Hunter Schafer (born 1998), American fashion model, actress, artist, and LGBT rights activist
- Hunter Shinkaruk (born 1995), Canadian ice hockey player
- Hunter Smith (born 1977), American football player
- Hunter S. Thompson (1937–2005), American writer
- Hunter Tylo (born 1962), American actress
- Hunter Wade (1916–2011), New Zealand diplomat
- Hunter Wendelstedt (born 1971), American baseball umpire
- Hunter Wohler (born 2003), American football player

=== Fictional characters ===
- Detective Sergeant Richard "Rick" Hunter, a titular character in the TV series Hunter
- Hunter (Gargoyles), a character in the television series Gargoyles
- Hunter (World of Warcraft), a character class in World of Warcraft
- Hunter Owen (EastEnders), a character in the British soap opera EastEnders
- Hunter Zolomon, a DC Comics supervillain known as Zoom

== See also ==
- Hunter (surname)
- Hunter (disambiguation)
