= 2002 in art =

The year 2002 in art involved various significant events.

== Events ==
- 21 May – Extensions to the Queen's Gallery at Buckingham Palace, London, designed by John Simpson, are opened.
- 3 July – Decapitation of a statue of Margaret Thatcher: a man decapitates a statue of former Prime Minister of the United Kingdom Margaret Thatcher on display at the Guildhall Art Gallery in the City of London.
- 10 July – At a Sotheby's auction, Peter Paul Rubens' painting The Massacre of the Innocents is sold for £49.5million (US$76.2 million) to Lord Thomson of Fleet.
- 13 July – Baltic Centre for Contemporary Art opens in the converted Baltic Flour Mill at Gateshead in North East England.
- 29 August – Frida, a biopic starring Salma Hayek as Frida Kahlo, receives its world première at the Venice International Film Festival.
- 6 October – Adam by Venetian Master Tullio Lombardo, which was the first life size marble sculpture created since antiquity falls off its display pedestal (which was unable to beat its weight) at the Metropolitan Museum of Art in New York City and shatters into many pieces and fragments.
- 22 November – Eric Carle Museum of Picture Book Art opens to the public in Amherst, Massachusetts.
- 14 December – New building for the Modern Art Museum of Fort Worth in Texas, designed by Tadao Ando, opens to the public.
- Full date unknown – A sculpture by Henri Matisse, Reclining Nude I (Dawn), is sold for US$9.2 million, a record for a Matisse sculpture at the time.

== Exhibitions ==
- May 30 until August 18 - Robert Longo: Works from the Freud Cycle at the Jewish Museum Berlin in Berlin, Germany.
- September 12 until October 22 - "Mike Bidlo: Not Picasso, Not Pollock, Not Warhol at the Astrup Fearnley Museum of Modern Art in Oslo, Norway.

== Awards ==
- Archibald Prize – Cherry Hood, Simon Tedeschi Unplugged
- Beck's Futures – Toby Paterson
- Hugo Boss Prize – Pierre Huyghe
- John Moores Painting Prize - Peter Davies for "Super Star Fucker - Andy Warhol Text Painting"
- Turner Prize – Keith Tyson
- Wynne Prize – Angus Nivision, Remembering Rain

== Works ==
- Magdalena Abakanowicz – Nierozpoznani ("The Unrecognised Ones", sculpture)
- Banksy – Balloon Girl (mural, London)
- Patricia Cronin – Memorial To A Marriage at Woodlawn Cemetery in The Bronx, New York
- Ken Currie – Three Oncologists
- Da Tung and Xi'an Bao Bao (bronze, Portland, Oregon)
- Helen Frankenthaler – Contentment Island
- Lucian Freud
  - Portrait of David Hockney
  - Naked Portrait (Kate Moss)
- Gwen Gillen – Mary Tyler Moore (statue, Minneapolis, Minnesota)
- Anish Kapoor – Marsyas (Tate Modern, London)
- Ron Mueck – Mask II (sculpture)
- Claes Oldenburg and Coosje van Bruggen – Cupid's Span (sculpture, San Francisco)
- Moises Cabrera Orozco – Statue of Benito Juárez (cast in Mexico 2002; installed in Bryant Park, Manhattan, New York City 2004)
- Neo Rauch
  - Hunt (Hatz)
  - Reactionary Situation (Reaktionäre Situation)
- Ed Ruscha - Tulsa Slut
- William Wegman – Dog Bowl (sculpture, Portland, Oregon)
- Olbram Zoubek, Jan Kerel and Zdeněk Holzel – "Memorial to the Victims of Communism" in Prague

== Deaths ==
=== January to June ===
- 15 January – Eugène Brands, Dutch painter (b. 1913)
- 30 January – Inge Morath, Austrian photographer (b. 1923)
- February – Víctor Grippo, painter, engraver and sculptor, the father of conceptual art in Argentina (b. 1936)
- 16 February – Peter Voulkos, American ceramic sculptor (b. 1924)
- 12 March – Jean-Paul Riopelle, Canadian painter and sculptor (b. 1923)
- 22 May – Niki de Saint Phalle, French sculptor, painter, and film maker (b. 1930).
- 12 June – Bill Blass, American fashion designer (b. 1922).

=== July to December ===
- 8 July – Ward Kimball, American Academy Award-winning animator (b. 1914).
- 13 July – Yousuf Karsh, Armenian-Canadian photographer (b. 1908).
- 17 July – George Rickey, American kinetic sculptor (b. 1907).
- 5 August – Robert Lenkiewicz, English painter (b. 1941).
- 11 August – Galen Rowell, American wilderness photographer, in aviation accident (b. 1940).
- 22 August – Richard Lippold, American sculptor (b. 1915).
- 19 October - Guy Krohg, Norwegian painter (b. 1917).
- 20 October - Andrew Martz, Russian animal sculptor (b. 1924).
- 18 November – Bryan Robertson, English curator (b. 1925).
- 23 November – Roberto Matta, Chilean painter (b. 1911).
- 9 December
  - Ian Hornak, American painter and draughtsman (b. 1944).
  - Stan Rice, American poet and artist (b. 1942).
- 26 December – Herb Ritts, American photographer (b. 1952).
