= Sedliště =

Sedliště may refer to places in the Czech Republic:

- Sedliště (Frýdek-Místek District), a municipality and village in the Moravian-Silesian Region
- Sedliště (Jičín District), a municipality and village in the Hradec Králové Region
- Sedliště (Plzeň-South District), a municipality and village in the Plzeň Region
- Sedliště (Svitavy District), a municipality and village in the Pardubice Region
- Sedliště, a village and part of Čejetice in the South Bohemian Region
- Sedliště, a village and part of Jimramov in the Vysočina Region
- Sedliště, a village and part of Vyskytná in the Vysočina Region
- Staré Sedliště, a municipality and village in the Plzeň Region
