= Litomyšl =

- Town
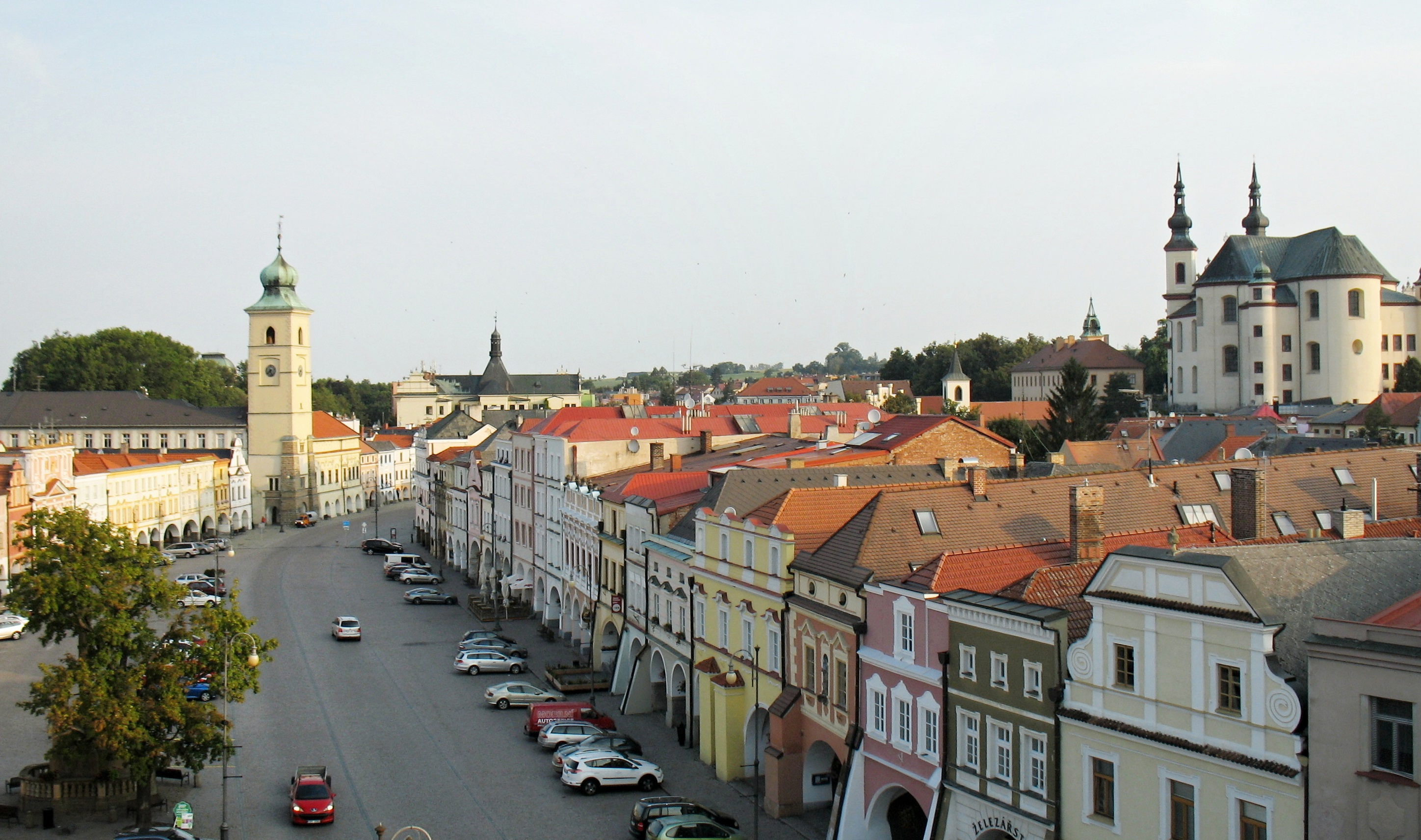
- Smetanovo náměstí with the town hall and the Church of the Finding the Holy Cross

- Flag Coat of arms

- Location in the Czech Republic
- Coordinates: 49°52′19″N 16°18′38″E
- Country: Czech Republic
- Region: Pardubice
- District: Svitavy
- First mentioned: 981

Government
  - Mayor: Daniel Brýdl

Area
  - Total: 33.44 km^{2} (12.91 sq mi)
- Elevation: 330 m (1,080 ft)

Population (2026-01-01)
  - Total: 10,411
  - Density: 311.3/km^{2} (806.4/sq mi)
- Time zone: UTC+1 (CET)
  - Summer (DST): UTC+2 (CEST)
- Postal code: 570 01
- Website: www.litomysl.cz

UNESCO World Heritage Site
- Official name: Litomyšl Castle
- Criteria: Cultural: (ii)(iv)
- Reference: 901
- Inscription: 1999 (23rd Session)
- Area: 4.25 ha (0.0164 sq mi)
- Buffer zone: 118.13 ha (0.4561 sq mi)

Litomyšl (Czech pronunciation: [ˈlɪtomɪʃl̩]; German: Leitomischl) is a town in Svitavy District in the Pardubice Region of the Czech Republic. It has about 10,000 inhabitants. The town is located on the Loučná River in the Svitavy Uplands. It is a former bishopric and Latin Catholic titular see.

Litomyšl is known for the château-type castle complex of the Litomyšl Castle, which is a UNESCO World Heritage Site. The historic town centre with the castle complex is well preserved and is protected as an urban monument reservation.

== Administrative division ==
Litomyšl consists of ten municipal parts (in brackets population according to the 2021 census):

- Litomyšl-město (6,026)
- Kornice (137)
- Lány (441)
- Nedošín (526)
- Nová Ves u Litomyšle (99)
- Pazucha (130)
- Pohodlí (290)
- Suchá (101)
- Zahájí (1,147)
- Záhradí (1,130)

Nová Ves u Litomyšle and Pohodlí form an exclave of the municipal territory.

== Etymology ==
The name is derived from the personal name Litomysl (in Old Czech written as Ľutomysl), meaning "Litomysl's (castle)".

== Geography ==
Litomyšl is located about 16 kilometres (10 mi) northwest of Svitavy and 41 km (25 mi) southeast of Pardubice. It lies in the Svitavy Uplands. The highest point is at 558 m (1,831 ft) above sea level. The Loučná River flows through the town. There are several fishponds in the municipal territory, the largest of which is Velký Košíř, located northwest of the town proper.

== History ==
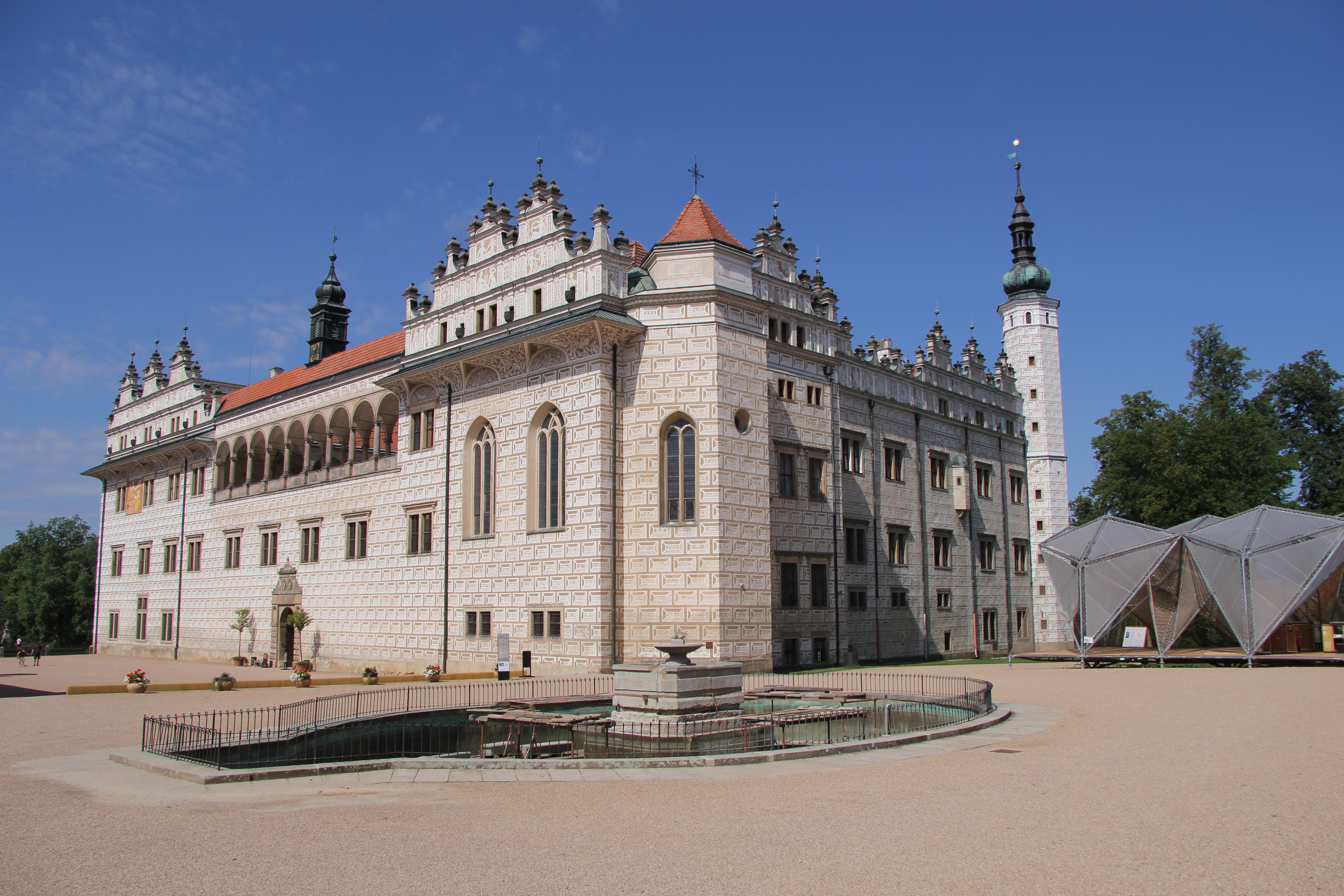
Litomyšl Castle

The first written mention of Litomyšl is from 981. It is a record in Chronica Boemorum mentioning death of Duke Slavník. Litomyšl was originally a protective fortified settlement of the Slavník dynasty principality on a significant trade route from Bohemia to Moravia. In 1259, Litomyšl was promoted to a town by King Ottokar II.

During the following centuries the town was owned by various noble families: Kostka of Postupice, Pernštejn, Trauttmansdorff, Waldstein-Wartemberg and last Thurn und Taxis. The Litomyšl Castle was built in 1568–1581 by the Pernštejns.

From 30 April 1344 till its suppression in 1474, the town was the seat of the Latin Catholic Diocese of Litomyšl, until its territory was merged back into the (meanwhile Metropolitan Arch) Diocese of Prague. In 1970, it was nominally restored as titular see.

A congregation of the proto-Protestant brotherhood Unitas Fratrum (Unity of the Brethren) was documented in Litomyšl as early as 1490. The Brethren flourished in Litomyšl, being protected by the Kostka family. The Brethren founded a printing press there. The town, along with Mladá Boleslav, became a major centre for the Brethren. However, after the Catholic emperor emerged victorious from the Schmalkaldic War, bishop Jan Augusta was captured and imprisoned in 1548 and the Brethren were expelled from Litomyšl and many emigrated to Poland and Moravia.

In the 19th century, Litomyšl ceased to be the main economical centre of the region, but remained the cultural and educational centre. Until 1918, the town was a part of Austria-Hungary, head of the district with the same name, one of the 94 Bezirkshauptmannschaften in Bohemia.

Existence of the Jewish community is documented at least from the late 16th century. During the Holocaust, in 1942, the last families were deported. Litomyšl had a German-speaking community until it was expelled in 1945 as a result of the Beneš decrees.

== Demographics ==
Historical population

Year	Pop.	±%
1869	8,597	—
1880	9,113	+6.0%
1890	9,636	+5.7%
1900	9,651	+0.2%
1910	9,329	−3.3%

Year	Pop.	±%
1921	8,737	−6.3%
1930	8,638	−1.1%
1950	7,655	−11.4%
1961	8,427	+10.1%
1970	8,884	+5.4%

Year	Pop.	±%
1980	10,253	+15.4%
1991	10,187	−0.6%
2001	10,358	+1.7%
2011	10,154	−2.0%
2021	10,027	−1.3%

Source: Censuses

== Transport ==
The I/35 road (the section from Hradec Králové to Svitavy, part of the European route E442) runs through the town.

Litomyšl is the starting point of the railway line of local importance heading to Choceň. The town is served by three train stations and stops.

== Culture ==
Since 1946, the town hosts "Smetanova Litomyšl", a large annual festival of classical music. It bears the name of the composer Bedřich Smetana, who is the most famous local native.

There is an extensive permanent exhibition of Olbram Zoubek's sculptures and art in Litomyšl Castle Vault Gallery.

=== Language ===
Until the late 19th century, the Litomyšl area had its own unique variety of the Czech language. This variety, named Teták by linguist Henning Andersen (after its word for 'five', /tet/, as opposed to Standard Czech pět /pjet/), underwent an unusual sound change: bilabial consonants (/p/, /b/, /m/) became alveolars (/t/, /d/, /n/) before front vowels. Examples are /tekɲe/ ('nicely'; Standard Czech pěkně), /diːlej/ ('white'; Standard Czech bílý) and /nesto/ ('town'; Standard Czech město).

== Sights ==
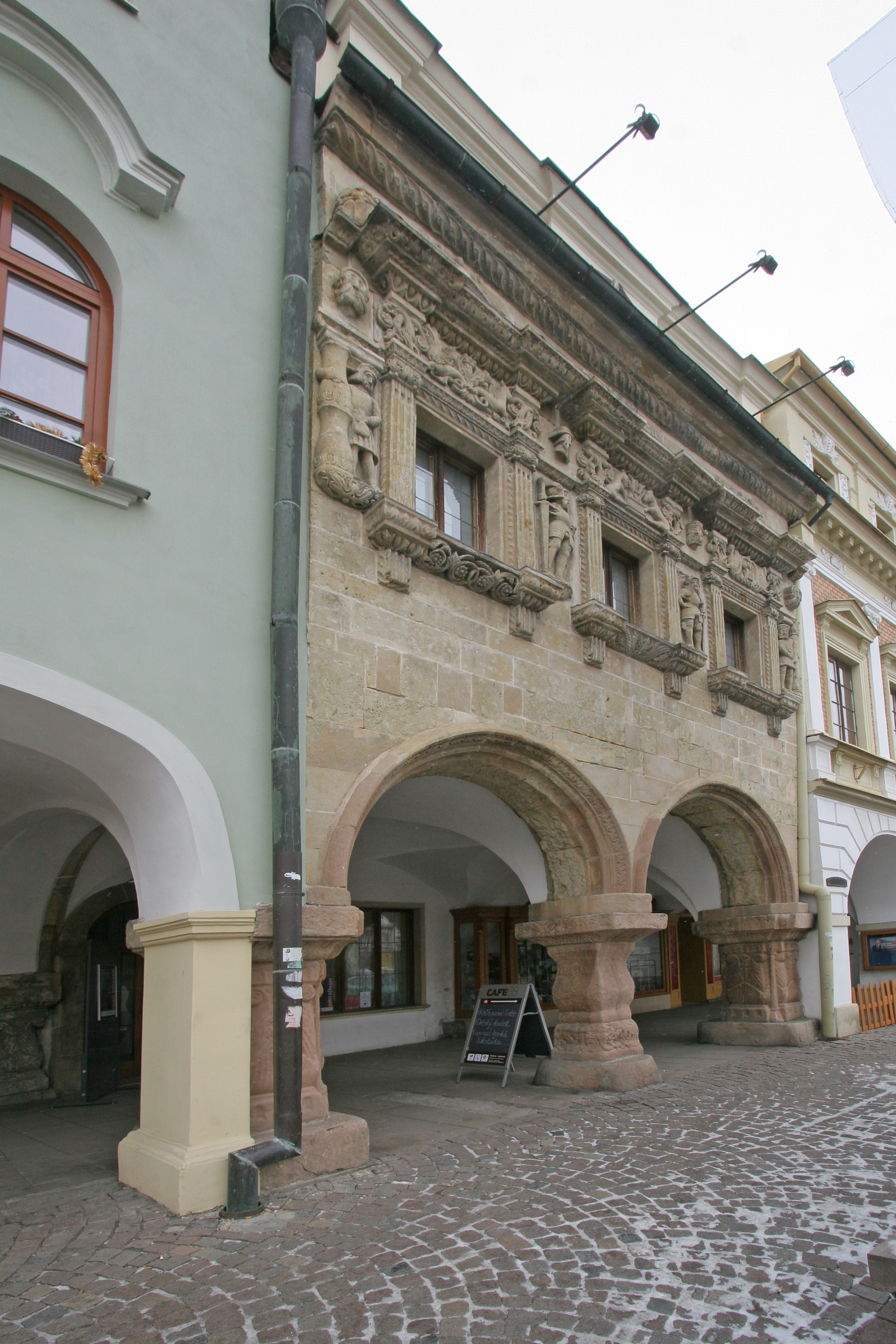
House U Rytířů

The main landmark of Litomyšl is the Litomyšl Castle, one of the largest Renaissance castles. The buildings of the castle precincts are exceptional for their architectural refinement. The castle complex also includes the birthplace of Bedřich Smetana, carriage house, stables, riding school, castle brewery, castle park and French-style garden. The castle complex was added to the UNESCO World Heritage List in 1999.

Next to the castle is the Piarist college with the seat of members of the order, the Church of the Finding the Holy Cross and adjacent monastery gardens. Today the gardens serve as a town park. The gardens include sculptures by Olbram Zoubek.

On the elongated square, which is almost 500 metres (1,600 ft) long and one of the largest in Central Europe, is a town hall of Gothic origin and series of Renaissance and Baroque houses, many with arcades and vaulted ground floor rooms. One of the most significant burgher houses is the house U Rytířů ("At the Knights"), a Renaissance house built from 1540 to 1546 with a notable stone façade.

Litomyšl is also home to the "Portmoneum", a museum of the artist and writer Josef Váchal in the home of his admirer Josef Portman, who commissioned Váchal's murals and painted furniture in the house.

== Notable people ==
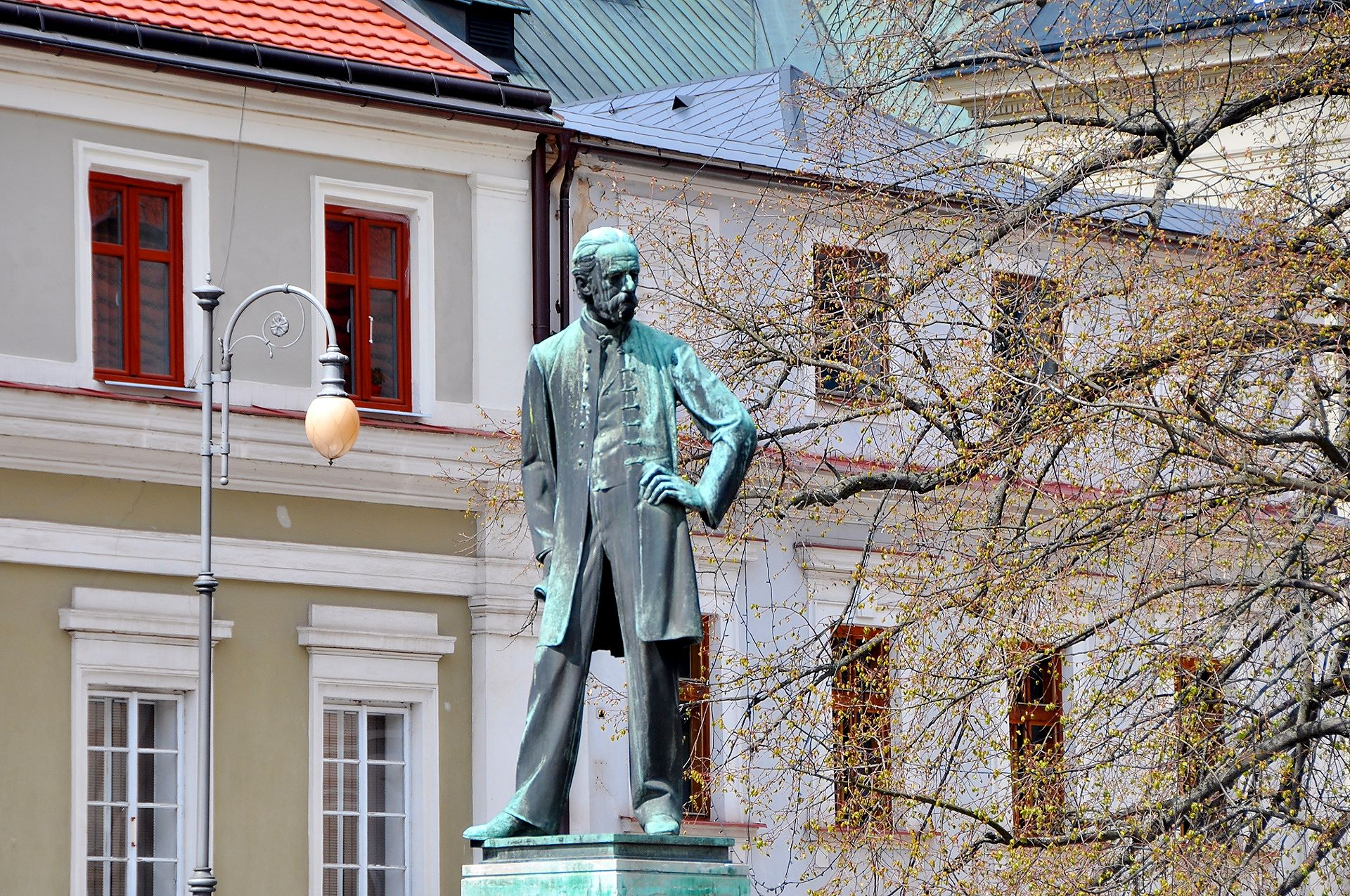
Statue of Bedřich Smetana on the Smetanovo Square

- Jan Augusta (1500–1572), bishop of the Unitas Fratrum and Protestant reformer; lived here
- Magdalena Dobromila Rettigová (1785–1845), author of the first cookbook written in Czech; lived here in 1834–1845
- August von Jilek (1819–1898) physician and oceanographer
- Bedřich Smetana (1824–1884), classical composer
- Julius Mařák (1832–1899), painter and graphic designer
- Eduard Pospichal (1838–1905), Austrian botanist
- Josef Kořenský (1847–1938), traveller, educator and writer; worked here as a teacher in 1871–1874
- Zdeněk Nejedlý (1878–1962), musicologist and politician
- Božena Jelínková-Jirásková (1880–1951), painter
- Arne Novák (1880–1939), critic and historian of literature
- Zdeněk Kopal (1914–1993), astronomer
- Karel Píč (1920–1995), Esperantist and writer
- Miroslav Macek (1944–2024), politician
- Václav Jílek (born 1976), football manager
- Markéta Adamová (born 1984), politician

== Twin towns – sister cities ==
Litomyšl is twinned with:

- Levoča, Slovakia
- Noordenveld, Netherlands
- San Polo d'Enza, Italy
