= Esperanto in the Czech Republic =

International auxiliary language in Czechia

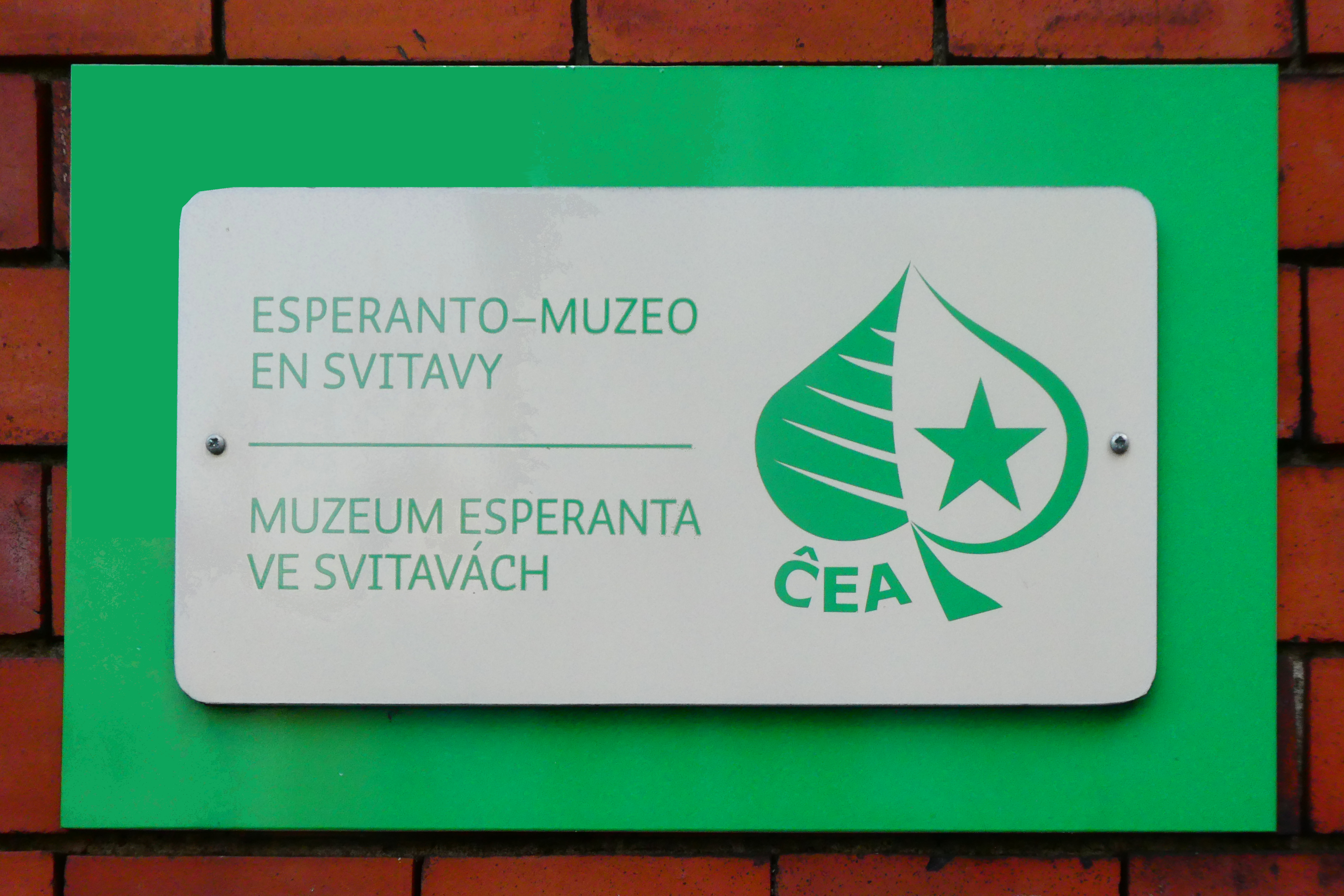
A bilingual Czech/Esperanto sign at the Esperanto Museum

Esperanto has been used in the Czech Republic since the 19th century. It was suppressed by the Nazi and Communist governments of the 20th century before being revived in 1969. The Czech Republic is home to the Esperanto Museum in Svitavy.

== Linguistics ==
The Czech language is not a major influence in Esperanto, but some concepts that originate from the Czech Republic lend their names to Esperanto words. These include haĉeko from the Czech háček to refer to the Czech caron mark and polko from the Czech polka to refer to Czech polka dancing. The Esperanto name for the Czech Republic is Ĉeĥio.

== History ==
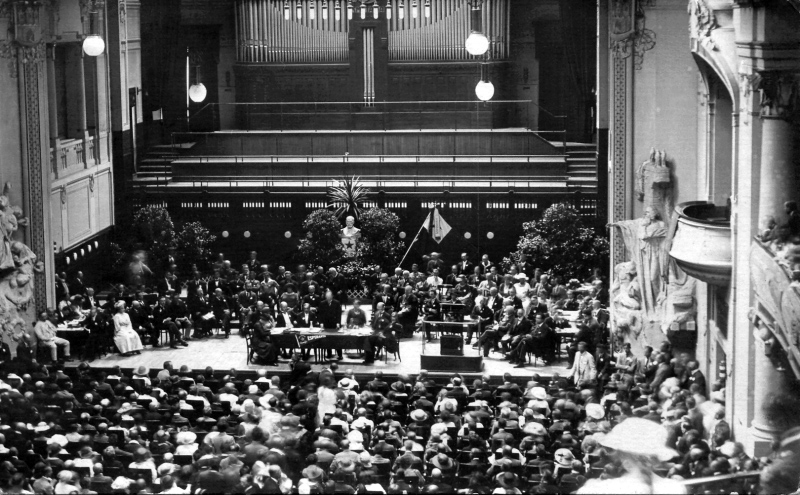
The World Esperanto Congress meets in Prague in 1921.

=== Early history (1887–1948) ===
The first Esperanto textbook, Esperanto por Bohemoj, was released in 1890 (three years after L. L. Zamenhof published Esperanto) by František Vladimír Lorenc. The first Esperanto club was founded in Brno in 1901. Among the founders were MP Josef Hybeš, teacher Heřman Alferi, a well-known Esperanto expert and promoter and Karel Pelant, Dělnické listy newspaper editor. In Prague, the first club was co-founded in 1902 by Stanislav Kostka Neumann. There were two Esperanto unions in Prague; Bohema Unio Esperantista, which only accepted clubs and associations and Bohema Asocio Esperantista, which was the union for individuals. Both unions had their own newspaper.

While most social democratic movements opposed the Esperanto movement, the Czech social democrats passed a resolution in favor of Esperanto in 1911. Czechoslovakia was the only country in Eastern Europe where the Esperanto movement was not condemned by the government during the interwar period.

After World War I, the rival unions merged and Ĉeĥoslovaka Asocio Esperantista union was created. The 1921 World Esperanto Congress was held in Prague. By 1928, there were 8,967 recorded Esperantists in Czechoslovakia. Radio in Czechoslovakia began airing Esperanto broadcasts in the 1930s. In 1936, Ĉeĥoslovaka Asocio Esperantista union changed its name to Esperanto-Asocio en ČSR. At that time, magazines like La Progreso, or later Liglio were published. The German Esperanto League in Czechoslovakia was dissolved in 1938 in response to the occupation of Czechoslovakia. The Esperanto Association in ČSR was being restricted to activity within the Czech community in 1939 up until 1940, when the union was disbanded by Gestapo. It was restored after the end of World War II in 1945. The official authority was the Esperantista magazine and Esperantisto Slovaka in Slovakia.

Czech high school teacher Miloš Lukáš was an early Esperantist writer and translator, learning the language in 1907 and contributing to Esperantist periodicals in the 1920s and 1930s. Tomáš Pumpr was also active at this time, and both continued to contribute to the Esperanto movement for decades. Other notable Czech Esperantists during this period include Antonín Eltschkner, Jan Filip or Petr Ginz.

=== Czechoslovak Socialist Republic (1948–1989) ===
The Communist Party took power in Czechoslovakia in 1948, and the Czech Esperanto movement began to be suppressed. The Esperanto Association in the Czechoslovak Republic (EAĈSR) was the primary Esperanto group in the country, and its 1950 congress attracted nearly a thousand participants. Between 1950 and 1951, Esperanto media outlets were shut down, and EAĈSR was disbanded in 1952. Esperanto groups operated and published semi-legally through other organizations, such as education and labor groups. La Pacdefendanto by Czech Esperantist Rudolf Burda was highly influential at this time. The Czechoslovak government ended publication of La Pacdefendanto in 1956. The Esperanto movement in Czechoslovakia was not permitted to resume activities until 1969 when a new Czech Esperanto Association was founded.

Czech chemistry professor Vlastimil Novobilský began contributing to the Esperantist movement in the 1950s and continued to be active through the rest of the 20th century. Czech author Karel Píč became a controversial figure in the Esperanto community in the 1980s for his use of neologisms. Another notable Czech author at this time was Eli Urbanova.

=== Czech Republic (1989–present) ===
In 1996, the Esperanto Congress met in Prague and developed the Manifesto of Prague to outline the principles of the Esperanto movement. As of 2007, there are about 900 members in the Czech Esperanto Association. The Esperanto Museum was established in Svitavy in 2008. Following the dissolution of Czechoslovakia in 1998, the Conference on the Application of Esperanto in Science and Technology was held in the Czech Republic until 2010 when it was relocated to Slovakia. Miloslav Vlk was another notable post-Communist Czech Esperantist.

== See also ==
- Demographics of the Czech Republic
- Languages of the Czech Republic

== Bibliography ==
- Forster, Peter G. (1982). The Esperanto Movement. ISBN 9789027933997.
- Lins, Ulrich (2016). Dangerous Language — Esperanto Under Hitler and Stalin. Palgrave Macmillan. ISBN 9781349715053.
- Lins, Ulrich (2017). Dangerous Language — Esperanto and the Decline of Stalinism. Palgrave Macmillan. ISBN 9781352000207.
- Sutton, Geoffrey (2008). Concise Encyclopedia of the Original Literature of Esperanto, 1887-2007. Mondial. ISBN 9781595690906.
