= Kornitz =

Kornitz may refer to:

Poland

- German name of Kornice, Poland

Czech Republic

- German name of Chornice, Svitavy Districy
- German name of Kornice, Litomyšl, Svitavy Districy
