= Memorial To A Marriage =

Marriage equality monument

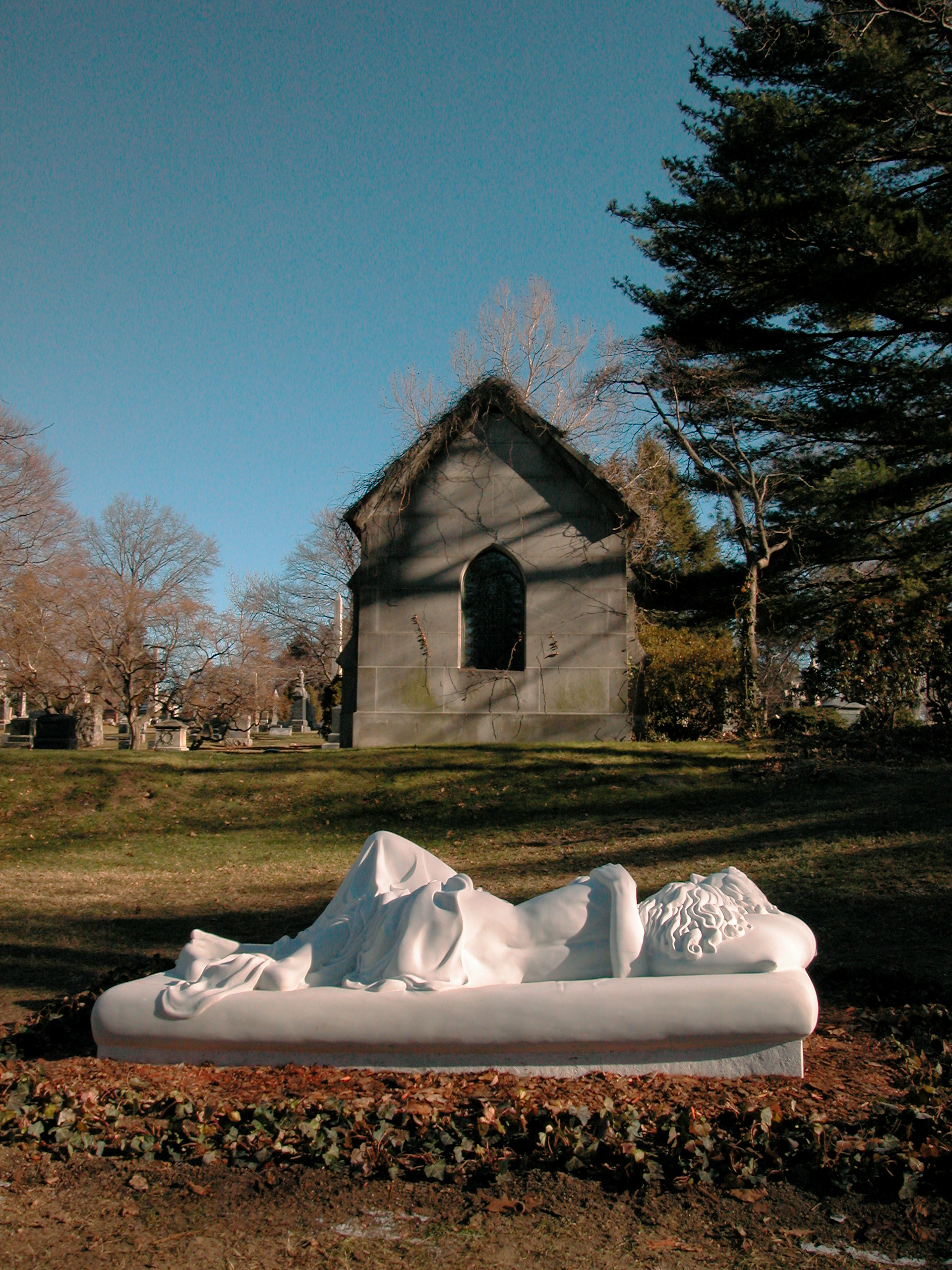
- Artist: Patricia Cronin
- Medium: Carrara marble
- Dimensions: (Over life-size in)

Memorial To A Marriage (2002) is the first marriage equality monument worldwide.

Created by American artist Patricia Cronin as part of a series of works redressing the absence of female and LGBTQ+ representation in public monuments and the prohibition of same sex marriage in the United States, this three-ton Carrara marble monumental statue is a double full figure portrait of the artist and her then partner (now wife) artist Deborah Kass, recumbent embracing on an inclined mattress, on a shared pillow in marital bliss and eternal rest. As an act of political resistance of being denied representation in public civic space by municipal leadership and denied personal liberty by the federal government, Cronin reinterprets sepulchral sculptural portraiture in the canon of Western art history by modeling and carving their likenesses in the patriotic form of 19th century American neo-classical sculpture to address a local and federal governmental failures.

Inspired by a range of art historical references from the Ancient sculpture Sleeping Hermaphrodite to 19th-century French painter, Gustove Courbet's The Sleep (1866) to American sculptor Harriet Hosmer's Beatrice Cenci, to William Henry Reinhart's Sleeping Children. It has also been pointed out that Cronin in titling the work was citing Lincoln Kirstein's book by the same title, Memorial To A Marriage on Augustus Saint-Gaudens' Adams Memorial sculpture.

Prior to the Supreme Court's Obergefell v. Hodges decision on June 26, 2015, over turning the Defense of Marriage Act making the United States only the 29th country out of 195 countries worldwide legalizing same sex marriage, the only legal path for same sex couples to attain a few of the 1200 legal protections heterosexual marriage includes was to hire lawyers to draw up wills, health care proxies and powers of attorney documents. The only purpose for these documents is about attending to events at the end of one's life, not celebrating the beginning of a life together.

Using the trope of death, all she was legally allowed, Cronin created an equally poetic and political conceptual artistic protest. The art historian Robert Rosenblum described the work as "so imaginative a leap into an artist's personal life and so revolutionary a monument in terms of social history that it demands a full-scale monograph." He named the installation as one of the ten best shows of 2003 in Artforum.

She bought their joint burial plot for the installation in at Woodlawn Cemetery, a National Historic Landmark, and the jewel in the crown of the nineteenth-century garden cemetery movement. Designed as America's Père Lachaise Cemetery, it is the resting place for powerful and prominent Americans in the fields of industry, politics and culture including everyone from J.P. Morgan, Joseph Pulitzer, Ralph Bunche, Fiorello LaGuardia, Elizabeth Cady Stanton, Madame C. J. Walker, to Herman Melville, Duke Ellington, Miles Davis and Celia Cruz. It quickly became the third most visited plot in the cemetery.

On November 3, 2002, Cronin unveiled the work on her burial plot in Woodlawn Cemetery in the borough of The Bronx in New York City. She organized the day as a protest, parade, funeral and a party all rolled into one. It began with a historic walking tour followed by a graveside service, a reception at the Woolworth Chapel and then at the end of the day, friends and family gathered at their Tribeca loft. This project was produced in collaboration with Grand Arts and the Deitch Projects gallery in New York City.

The work, which is Cronin's first marble sculpture, stayed on the plot from November 3, 2002, until June 7, 2010, when it was removed responding to numerous exhibition requests from museums in the U.S. and Europe. It was immediately replaced with an identical bronze edition of the same size which will remain on the plot through eternity.

Memorial to a Marriage has been included in over 45 exhibitions in the U.S. and abroad, including: the Aldrich Museum of Contemporary Art, Ridgefield, Connecticut; American Academy in Rome, Rome, Italy; The Armory Show, New York, New York; Art Omi, Ghent, New York; Brooklyn Museum, Brooklyn, New York; The FLAG Art Foundation, New York, New York; Gallery of Modern Art, Glasgow, Scotland; Leslie-Lohman Museum of Gay and Lesbian Art, New York, New York; National Academy of Design, New York, New York; Neuberger Museum of Art, Purchase, New York; Newcomb Art Museum, New Orleans, Louisiana; Station Museum of Contemporary Art, Houston, Texas; and Tampa Museum of Art, Tampa, Florida, among others.

Bronze editions of the statue are in the permanent collections of several museums, including: Smithsonian Institution's National Portrait Gallery, Washington, DC; Perez Art Museum Miami, Miami, Florida; and Kelvingrove Art Gallery and Museum, Glasgow, Scotland where it is on permanent view since 2012.

Since the installation of Memorial To A Marriage, almost 20 years ago, same sex marriage was legalized in the United States in 2015. However, the monumental landscape has changed little with only a handful of monuments to women and members of the LGBTQ+ community realized and installed nationwide.

Cronin first explored lesbian themes of representation in her erotic watercolor series of the 1990s which were shown at numerous group exhibitions nationwide which examine adult sexual intimacy from a unique feminist lesbian perspective. In 1993, Cronin organized a panel discussion, Representing Lesbian Subjectivities at The Drawing Center which was expanded to a special issue of Art Papers which she guest edited.

In 2022, Memorial To A Marriage became the centerpiece of the first LGBTQ+ VR Museum headquartered in Bristol, England. It debuted the Tribeca Film Festival and won the New Voices Award in the Immersive Competition.
