= Kornice =

Kornice Kornice
- Village
- Kornice
- Location in the Czech Republic
- Coordinates: 49°53′N 16°18′E
- Country: Czech Republic
- Region: Pardubice
- District: Svitavy
- Municipality: Litomyšl

Area
  - Total: 2.87 km^{2} (1.11 sq mi)
- Elevation: 383 m (1,257 ft)

Population
  - Total: 191
  - Density: 66.6/km^{2} (172/sq mi)
- Time zone: UTC+1 (CET)
  - Summer (DST): UTC+2 (CEST)
- Postal code: 570 01
- Website: http://kornice.cz

Kornice (German: Kornitz) is a small village, administratively a part of the town of Litomyšl in the Czech Republic. It is located on the Hlavňov hill (at an elevation of 383 metres above sea level). The village has a population of 191 inhabitants.

== History ==
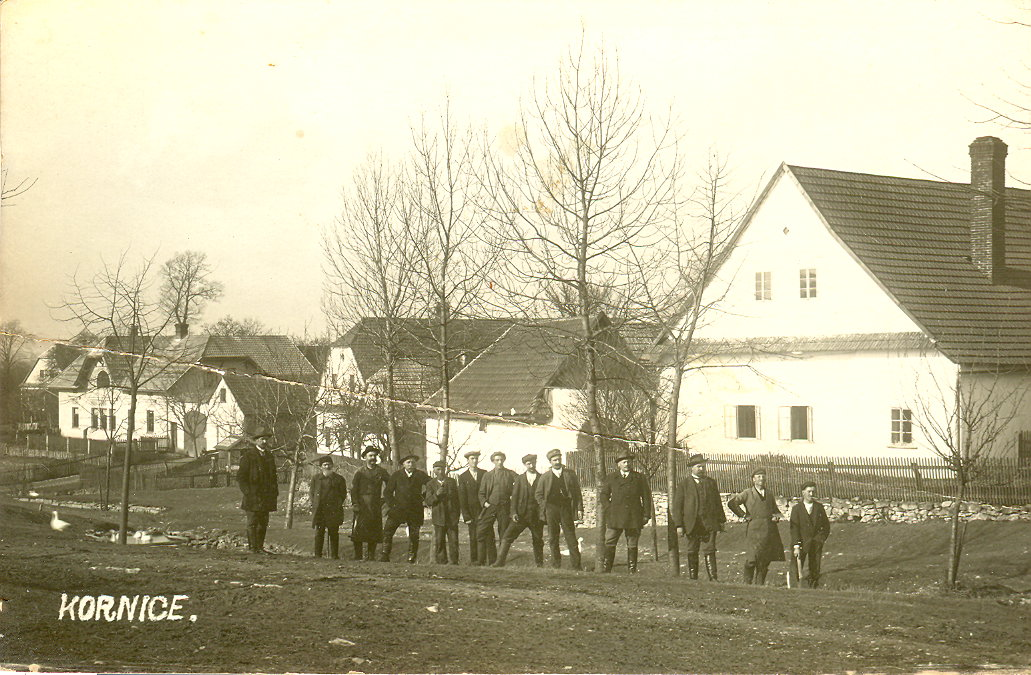
Kornice about 1920

People used to live here from the last ice age. At the end of the 12th century, a village named Domašice and a field next to it called Nakorniceh were recorded. Domašice was probably in the 13th century moved to the villages current location. Kornice is for the first time mentioned in 1347. It was a part of the domain of Litomyšl until 1848. Kornice was from 1850 administratively a part of Velké Sedliště but since 1898 had its own municipal office. From 1976 it is officially a part of the town Litomyšl.

== Sights ==
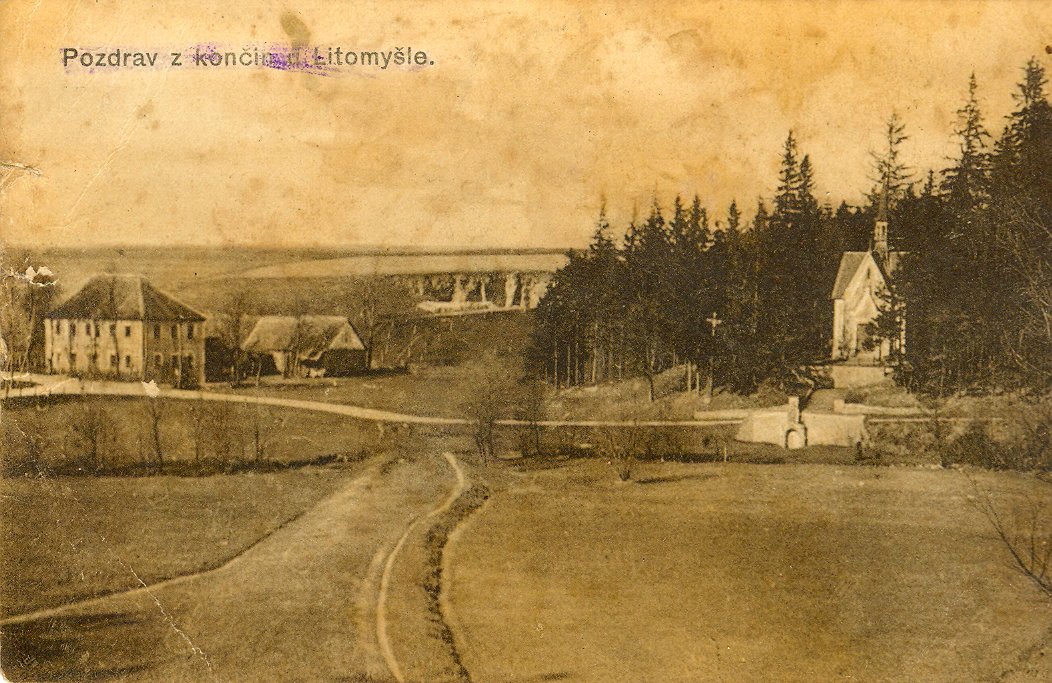
Končiny about 1910

There are two in the Gothic Revival style constructed chapels from 1873 and 1886. The first one is in the village square and the other one in the forest Končiny above an allegedly healing spring.
