= Hunt (Rauch) =

Painting by Neo Rauch

- Artist: Neo Rauch
- Year: 2002
- Medium: Oil on canvas
- Dimensions: 210 cm × 250 cm (83 in × 98 in)
- Location: Private collection

Hunt (German: Hatz) is a 2002 oil on canvas painting by the German artist Neo Rauch. It depicts a group of flying men in green coats and hats playing ice hockey among large ice cubes. The painting is owned by a private collector in Pennsylvania.

== Description ==
Four men dressed in green coats are engaged in a team sport with ice hockey sticks. Two of the men, wearing feathered tyrolean hats, hover above the ice. A third man has fallen and dropped his stick. The fourth man is stuck inside one of three large ice cubes on the ice. From another ice cube, a green maggot or slug is emerging.

To the left is a grey stone and concrete building with metal details. To the right is a yellow barrack with a white roof and gable wall, and two crossed planks across the door. In the upper right corner is a green and white sign with a white symbol identical to the algiz rune. In the background is a barren landscape with patches of snow.

== Reception ==
Alexi Worth of Artforum speculated whether the slug is what the players are chasing, or if it is "in fact a metamorphosed teammate". Worth wrote that "Rauch delights in such teasing narrative cues, and he delivers them with a beguiling stylization." He commented the painting's "skittering highlights" and wrote that it is "as though the whole tableau has been coated in some kind of spray-on rainproofing."

Valerie Nantel wrote in the Concordia Undergraduate Journal of Art History: "The desolate landscape and other elements suggest an immediate connection to Surrealist works. The dreamy quality of fading seems to pull towards the idea of the subconscious." Nantel wrote that the "passivity and detachment of the figures within the work disturb us as emotional beings", and that this "detachment is accentuated by the method in which the figures are rendered. They almost look as if they were stuck on to the canvas."
