= Sedliště (Jičín District) =

- Municipality
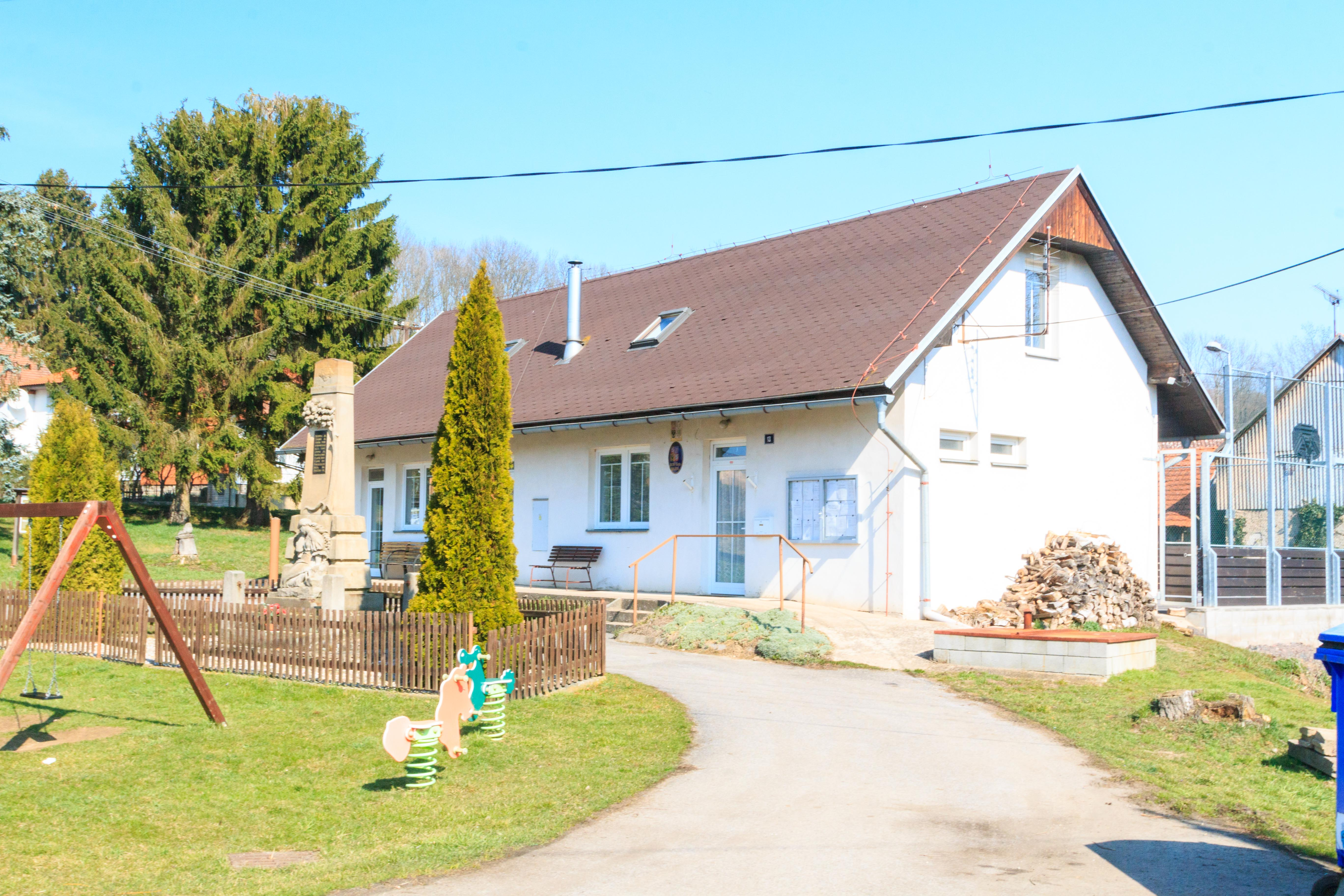
- Municipal office

- Location in the Czech Republic
- Coordinates: 50°23′39″N 15°13′9″E
- Country: Czech Republic
- Region: Hradec Králové
- District: Jičín
- First mentioned: 1340

Area
  - Total: 1.59 km^{2} (0.61 sq mi)
- Elevation: 240 m (790 ft)

Population (2026-01-01)
  - Total: 93
  - Density: 58/km^{2} (150/sq mi)
- Time zone: UTC+1 (CET)
  - Summer (DST): UTC+2 (CEST)
- Postal code: 507 23
- Website: www.sedliste-jc.cz

Sedliště is a municipality and village in Jičín District in the Hradec Králové Region of the Czech Republic. It has about 90 inhabitants.

== Demographics ==
Historical population
Year	Pop.	±%
1869	250	—
1880	260	+4.0%
1890	258	−0.8%
1900	253	−1.9%
1910	202	−20.2%
1921	220	+8.9%
1930	182	−17.3%
1950	139	−23.6%
1961	137	−1.4%
1970	124	−9.5%
1980	115	−7.3%
1991	96	−16.5%
2001	96	+0.0%
2011	105	+9.4%
2021	103	−1.9%
Source: Censuses
