= Reactionary Situation =

Painting by Neo Rauch

- Artist: Neo Rauch
- Year: 2002
- Medium: Oil on canvas
- Dimensions: 210 cm × 400 cm (83 in × 160 in)
- Location: Private collection

Reactionary Situation (German: Reaktionäre Situation) is an oil on canvas painting by the German artist Neo Rauch, from 2002. It is held in a private collection.

== Description ==
The painting depicts a rural landscape with poplars, a dilapidated manor house, a little girl, a man working the ground with a stick, a man praying on his knees before a floating windmill and a colourful rifle mounted on the ground.

== Provenance ==
The painting was exhibited at Galerie Eigen+Art in Berlin in 2002–03. It was bought by a private collector in 2002. In February 2015 it was sold through Christie's for £938,500 ($1,429,336), having been estimated to be worth £600,000–£800,000 ($913,800–$1,218,400).

== Reception ==
Frank Zöllner of Die Zeit wrote that Reactionary Situation is one of few Neo Rauch paintings where the landscape can be located to an existing place, as he associated the old poplars, the manor house with modern extensions and the unusual cloud formations with the Zöbigker and Gaschwitz areas in Markkleeberg. Katrin Wittneven wrote in Der Tagesspiegel that "the painting shows multiple perspectives simultaneously, which reinforces the surreal impression", and that although Rauch's titles often "give a direction for the viewer, they do not pursue any clear goal".
