= Olbram Zoubek =

Czech sculptor and designer (1926–2017)

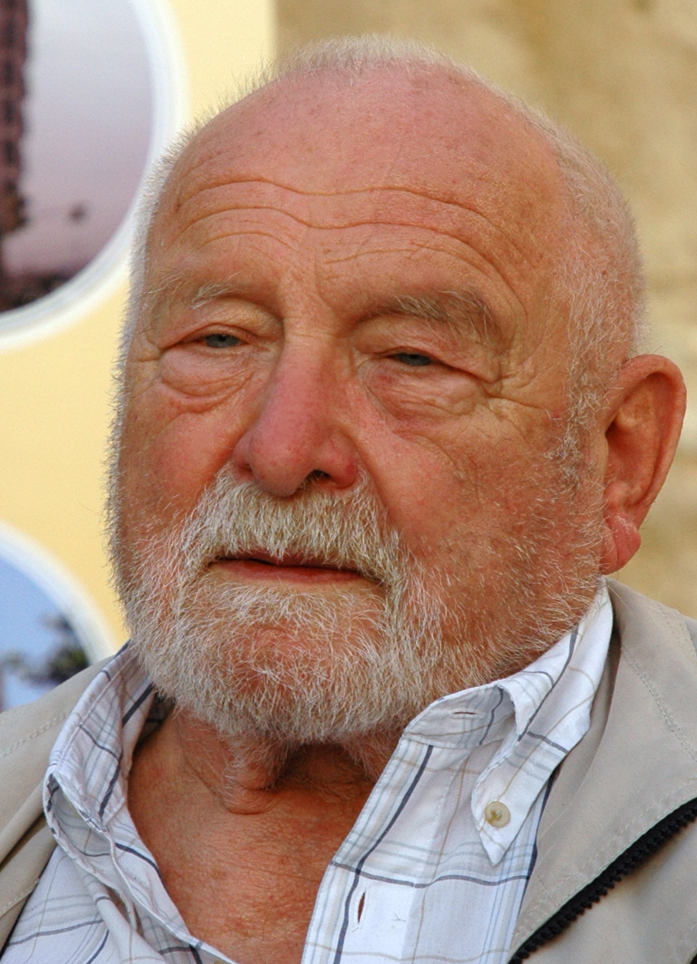
- Zoubek in 2012
- Born: 21 April 1926; Prague, Czechoslovakia
- Died: 15 June 2017 (aged 91); Prague, Czech Republic
- Occupation: Sculptor

Olbram Zoubek (21 April 1926 – 15 June 2017) was a Czech sculptor and designer. His work was inspired by Swiss-Italian sculptor Alberto Giacometti.

There is an extensive permanent exhibition of his sculptures and art in Litomyšl Castle Vault Gallery.

Zoubek was particularly well known for having taken a death mask of Jan Palach, a Charles University student who burned himself to death in protest over the 1968 Soviet invasion of Czechoslovakia. One of his most famous works is his "Memorial to the Victims of Communism" in Prague (done in collaboration with the architects Jan Kerel and Zdeněk Holzel).

== Gallery ==
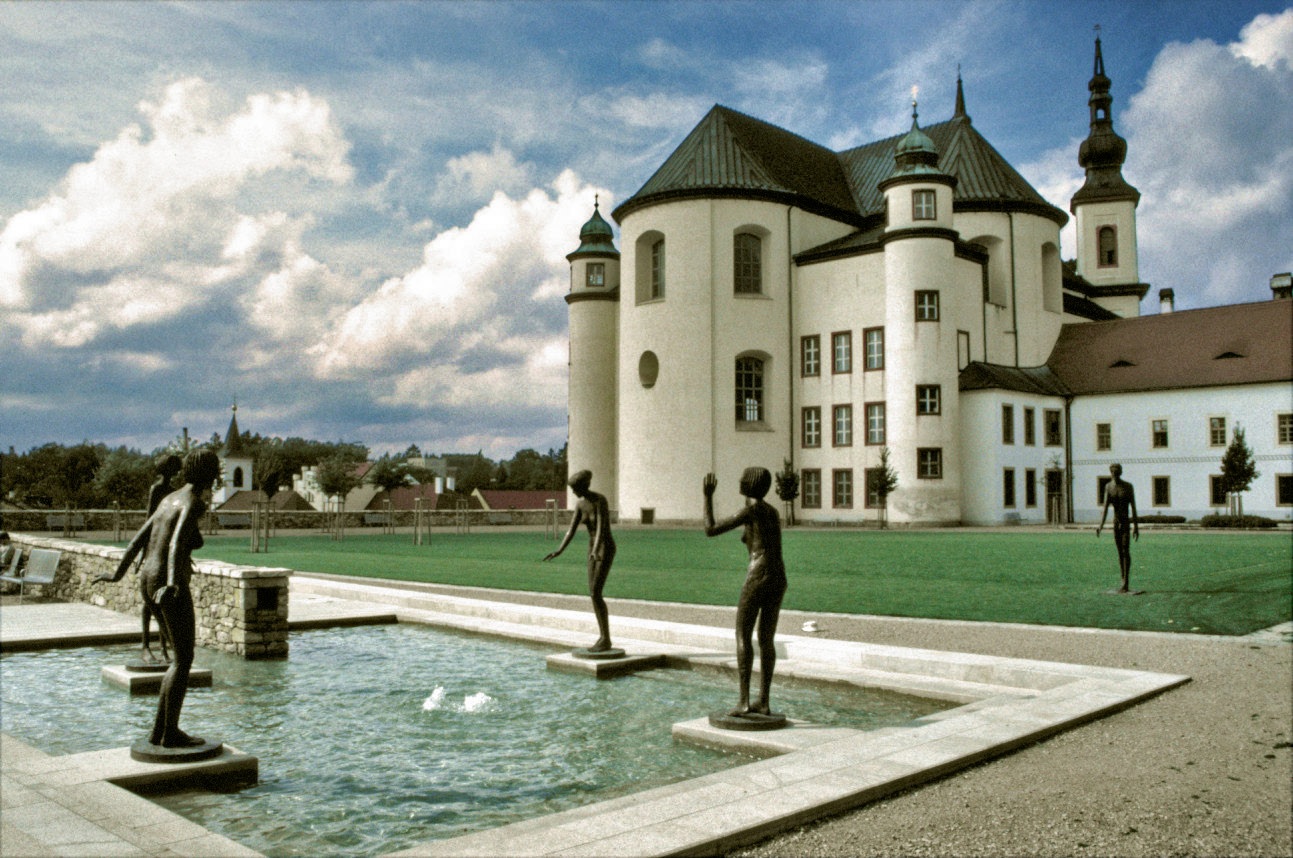
Some of Zoubek's sculptures

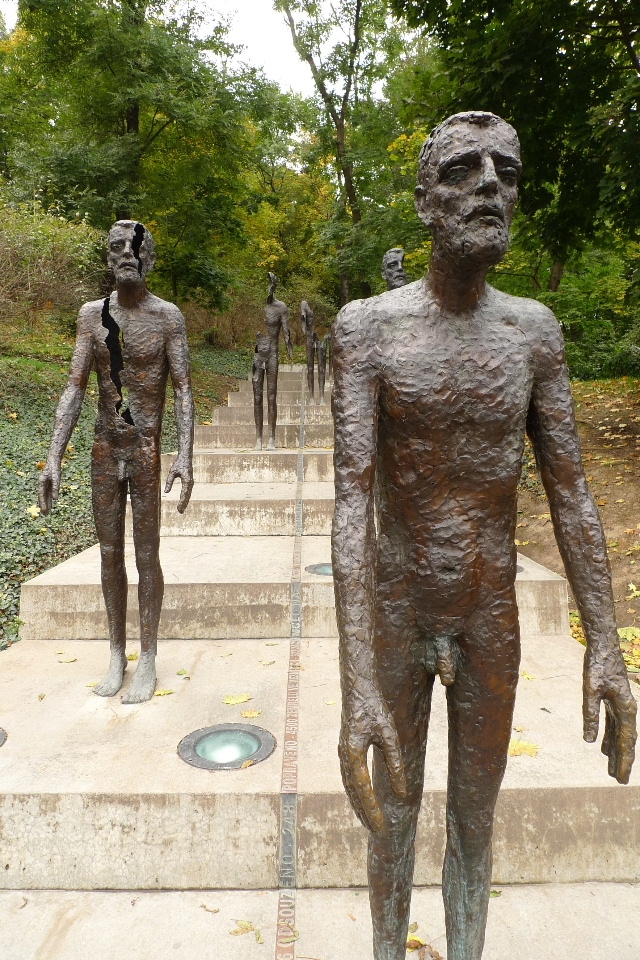
2002 The Broken Man is the work of Olbram Zoubek.

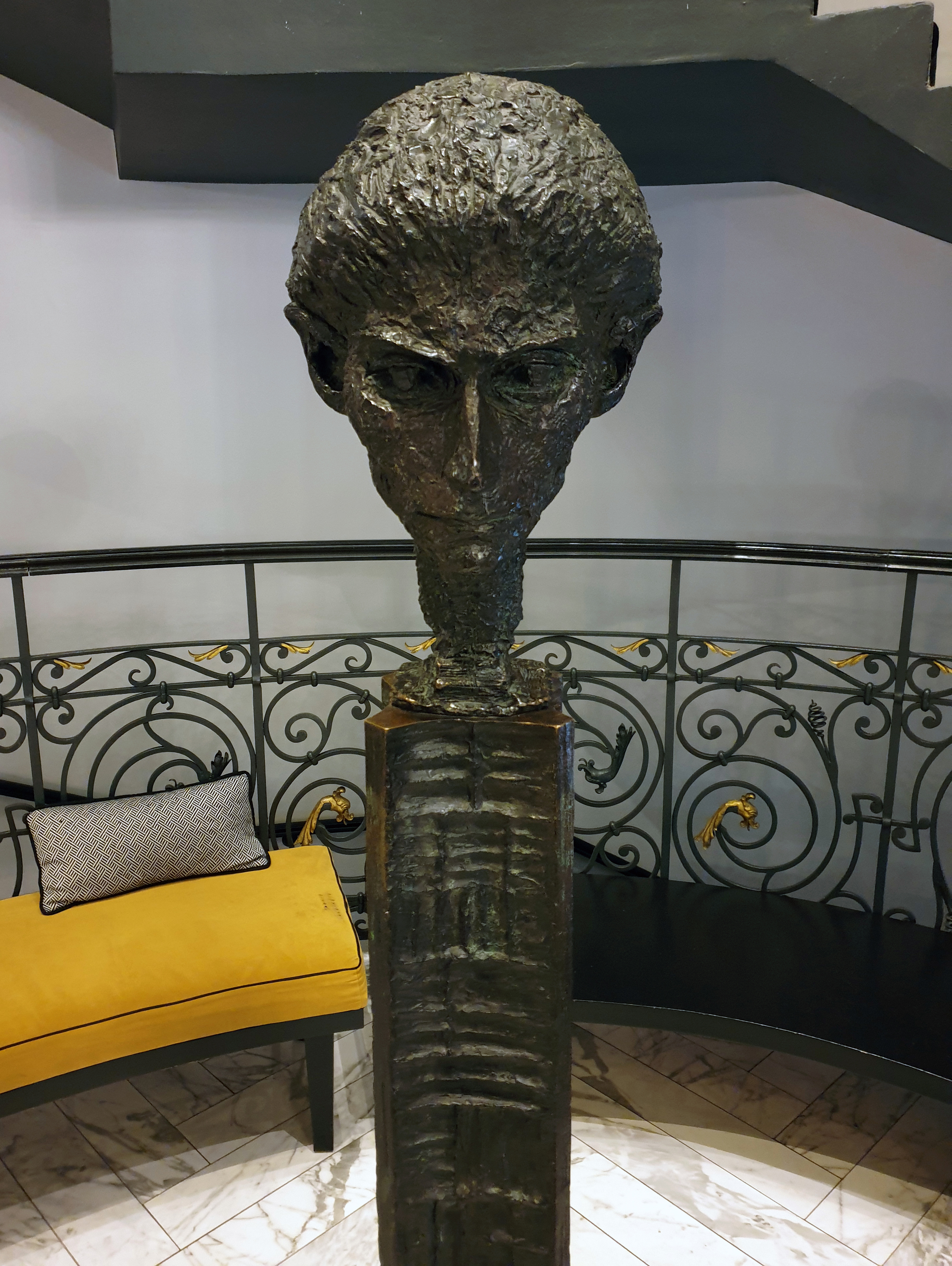
Bust of Franz Kafka
Prague
