= Litomyšl Castle =

UNESCO World Heritage Site
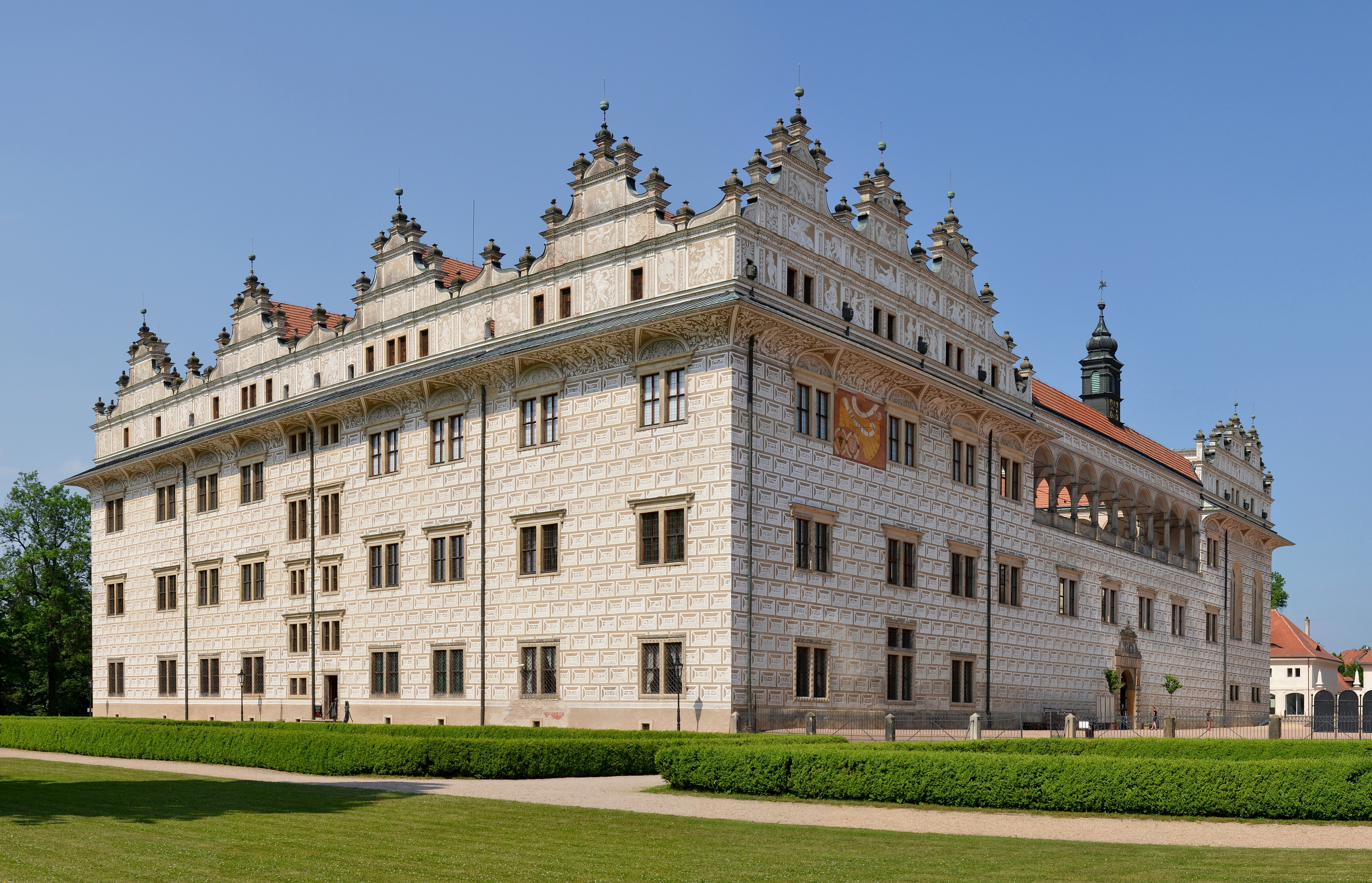
- Renaissance château in Litomyšl

- Location within Czech Republic
- Location: Litomyšl, Czech Republic
- Includes: Litomyšl Palace Theatre
- Criteria: Cultural: (ii)(iv)
- Reference: 901
- Inscription: 1999 (23rd Session)
- Area: 4.25 ha (0.0164 sq mi)
- Buffer zone: 118.13 ha (0.4561 sq mi)
- Website: www.zamek-litomysl.cz/en
- Coordinates: 49°52′25″N 16°18′52″E

Litomyšl Castle (Czech: Státní zámek v Litomyšli, lit. 'State Castle in Litomyšl') is one of the largest Renaissance castles in the Czech Republic. It is owned by the Czech state. It is located in the centre of the town of Litomyšl and was declared a UNESCO World Heritage Site in 1999. Litomyšl Castle is an outstanding example of the arcade castle, a type of building first developed in Italy and modified in the Czech lands to create an evolved form of special architectural quality. High-Baroque features were added to this castle in the 18th century.

== History ==
The town of Litomyšl developed in the 13th century on the trading route between Bohemia and Moravia. In 1568, work started on the construction of the castle, overseen by Jan Baptista Avostalis and his brother Oldřich. By 1580, most of the building had been constructed. The castle served as the domain of the prestigious Pernštejn family from 1567 until the death of the house's last member, Frebonie, in 1646.

From 1649, the castle belonged to the noble Trauttmansdorff family, who had it redesigned in the classicist Baroque style by František Maxmilián Kaňka in the first half of the 18th century (and are still preserved today). In 1758 the Counts Waldstein acquired it. Georg Josef von Waldstein-Wartenberg had the castle theater built. The last owners were the Princes of Thurn and Taxis, who acquired the castle in 1855.

The famous Czech composer Bedřich Smetana was born in 1824 at the Brewery, an ancillary building next to the castle.

After the Second World War, the castle was confiscated basis the so-called Beneš decrees and declared a national cultural monument in 1962. The Smetanová Litomyšl Opera Festival has been held in the castle since 1949. At the invitation of then President Václav Havel, a meeting of seven Central European presidents took place in the castle in 1994.

The entire castle complex, which has been extensively renovated in recent years, has been a UNESCO World Heritage Site since 1999 and was included in the list. It is open to the general public. Visitors can see the state rooms, and the former private quarters of prince Albert of Thurn and Taxis and his wife.

== Description ==
The castle itself has three floors and has four wings arranged asymmetrically. The largest is the west wing, while the smallest is the south wing, a two-story arcaded gallery, closing off a square courtyard. The arcading and groin vaulting continues around this courtyard. The eastern wing contains the castle chapel, and the western wing contains a theatre, with the stage decorations, machinery, and auditorium preserved intact.

In addition to the castle, there are several ancillary buildings, including the Brewery, which lies to the south of the larger, outside courtyard and was originally designed with sgraffito decorations to complement the castle. After a fire in 1726, it was remodeled by the famous Baroque architect František Maxmilián Kaňka. There is also an English-style park and a Baroque pavilion on the castle grounds.
