= Deborah Kass =

American painter (born 1952)

- Born: 1952 (age 73–74); San Antonio, Texas
- Education: Carnegie Mellon University (BFA)
- Style: Mixed media
- Spouse: Patricia Cronin
- Relatives: Sandy Koufax (cousin)

Deborah Kass (born 1952) is an American artist whose work explores the intersection of pop culture, art history, and the construction of self. Deborah Kass works in mixed media, and is most recognized for her paintings, prints, photography, sculptures and neon lighting installations. Kass's early work mimics and reworks signature styles of iconic male artists of the 20th century including Frank Stella, Andy Warhol, Jackson Pollock, and Ed Ruscha. Kass's technique of appropriation is a critical commentary on the intersection of social power relations, identity politics, and the historically dominant position of male artists in the art world.

== Early life ==
Deborah Kass was born in 1952 in San Antonio, Texas. Her grandparents were from Belarus and Ukraine, first generation Jewish immigrants to New York. Kass's parents were from the Bronx and Queens, New York. Her father did two years in the U.S. Air Force on base in San Antonio until the family returned to the suburbs of Long Island, New York, where Kass grew up. Kass's mother was a substitute teacher at the Rockville Centre public schools and her father was a dentist and amateur jazz musician.

At age 14, Kass began taking drawing classes at The Art Students League in New York City which she funded with money she made babysitting. In the afternoons, she would go to theater on and off Broadway, often sneaking for the second act. During her high school years, she would take her time in the city to visit the Museum of Modern Art, where she would be exposed to the works of post-war artists like Frank Stella and Willem de Kooning. At age 17, Stella's retrospective exhibition inspired Kass to become an artist as she observed and understood the logic in his progression of works and the motivation behind his creative decisions.

Kass' third cousin is Baseball Hall of Fame pitcher Sandy Koufax.

== Education ==
Kass received her BFA in Painting at Carnegie Mellon University (the alma mater of artist Andy Warhol), and studied at the Whitney Museum Independent Study Program Here, she created her first work of appropriation, Ophelia’s Death After Delacroix, a six by eight foot rendition of a small sketch by the French Romantic artist, Eugène Delacroix.

== Influences ==
At the same time Neo-Expressionism was being helmed by white men in the late Reagan years, women were just beginning to create a stake in the game for critical works. “The Photo Girls” consisted of artists like Sherrie Levine, Cindy Sherman, and Barbara Kruger. Kass felt that content of these works connected those of the post-war abstract painters of the mid-70s including Elizabeth Murray, Pat Steir, and Susan Rothenberg. All of these artists critically explored art in terms of new subjectivities from their points-of-view as women. Kass took from these artists the ideas of cultural and media critique, inspiring her Art History Paintings.

Kass is most famous for her “Decade of Warhol,” in which she appropriated various works by the pop artist, Andy Warhol. She used Warhol's visual language to comment on the absence of women in art history at the same time that Women's Studies began to emerge in academia. Reading texts on subjectivity, objectivity, specificity, and gender fluidity by theorists like Judith Butler and Eve Kosofsky Sedgwick, Kass became literate in ideas surrounding identity. She engaged with art history through the lens of feminism, because of this theory which “The Photo Girls” drew upon.

== Works ==
Kass's work is in the collections of the Museum of Modern Art; Whitney Museum of American Art; Solomon R. Guggenheim Museum; Jewish Museum (New York); Museum of Fine Art, Boston; Cincinnati Museum of Art; New Orleans Museum; National Portrait Gallery, Smithsonian Institution; Fogg Museum, Harvard Art Museums; and Weatherspoon Museum, among others.

In 2012 Kass's work was the subject of a mid-career retrospective Deborah Kass, Before and Happily Ever After at The Andy Warhol Museum in Pittsburgh, PA. An accompanying catalogue published by Skira Rizzoli, included essays by noted art historians Griselda Pollock, Irving Sandler, Robert Storr, Eric C. Shiner and writers and filmmakers Lisa Leibmann, Brooks Adams, and John Waters.

Kass's work has been shown at international private and public venues including at the Venice Biennale, the Istanbul Biennale, the Museum Ludwig, Cologne, the Museum of Modern Art, The Jewish Museum, New York, the National Portrait Gallery, and the Museum of Fine Arts, Boston. A survey show, Deborah Kass, The Warhol Project traveled across the country from 1999 to 2001. She is a Senior Critic in the Yale University M.F.A. Painting Program.

Kass's later paintings often borrow their titles from song lyrics. Her series feel good paintings for feel bad times, incorporates lyrics borrowed from The Great American Songbook, which address history, power, and gender relations that resonate with Kass's themes in her own work.

=== Art History Paintings 1989–1992 ===
In Kass's first significant body of work, the Art History Paintings, she combined frames lifted from Disney cartoons and panels of Charles Schulz comics with slices of paintings from Paul Cézanne, Jasper Johns, Robert Motherwell, Pablo Picasso, Jackson Pollock, David Salle, Andy Warhol, and other contemporary sources. Establishing appropriation as her primary mode of working, these early paintings also introduced many of the central concerns of her work to the present. Before and Happily Ever After, for example, coupled Andy Warhol's painting of an advertisement for a nose job with a movie still of Cinderella fitting her foot into her glass slipper, touching on notions of Americanism and identity in popular culture. The Art History Paintings series engages critically with the history of politics and art making, especially exploring the power relationship of men and women in society. Deborah Kass's work reveals a personal relationship she shares with particular artworks, songs and personalities, many of which are referenced directly in her paintings.

=== The Warhol Project 1992–2000 ===
In 1992, Kass began The Warhol Project. Beginning in the 1960s, Andy Warhol’s paintings employed mass production through screen-printing to depict iconic American products and celebrities. Using Warhol’s stylistic language to represent significant women in art, Kass turned Warhol’s relationship to popular culture on its head by replacing them with subjects of her own cultural interests. She painted artists and art historians that were her heroes including Cindy Sherman, Elizabeth Murray, and Linda Nochlin. Drawing upon her childhood nostalgia, the Jewish Jackie series depicts actress Barbra Streisand, a celebrity with whom she closely identifies, replacing Warhol's prints of Jackie Kennedy Onassis and Marilyn Monroe. Her My Elvis series likewise speaks to gender and ethnic identity by replacing Warhol's Elvis with Barbra Streisand from Yentl: a 1983 film in which Streisand plays a Jewish woman who dresses and lives as a man in order to receive an education in the Talmudic Law. Kass's Self Portraits as Warhol further deteriorates the idea of rigid gender norms and increasingly identifies the artist with Warhol. By appropriating Andy Warhol's print Triple Elvis and replacing Elvis Presley with Barbara Streisand’s Yentl, Kass is able to identify herself with history’s icons, creating a history with powerful women as subjects of art. The work embodies her concerns surrounding gender representation, advocates for a feminist revision of art, and directly challenges the tradition of patriarchy.

=== America’s Most Wanted ===
America's Most Wanted is a series of enlarged black-and-white screen prints of fake police mug shots. The collection of prints from 1998–1999 is a late-1990s update of Andy Warhol’s 1964 work 13 Most Wanted Men, which featured the most wanted criminals of 1962. The “criminals” are identified in titles only by first name and surname initial, but in reality the criminals depicted are individuals prominent in today's art world. Some of the individuals depicted include Donna De Salvo, deputy director for international initiatives and senior curator at the Whitney Museum of American Art; Thelma Golden, director and chief curator of the Studio Museum in Harlem, and Robert Storr, dean of the Yale School of Art. Kass's subjects weren't criminals. Through this interpretation, Kass show's how they are wanted by aspirants for their ability to elevate artists’ careers. The series explores the themes of authorship and the gaze, at the same time problematizing certain connotations within the art world.

=== Feel Good Paintings for Feel Bad Times 2002–ongoing ===
In 2002, Kass began a new body of work, feel good paintings for feel bad times, inspired, in part, by her reaction to the Bush administration. These works combine stylistic devices from a wide variety of post-war painting, including Ellsworth Kelly, Frank Stella, Jackson Pollock, Andy Warhol, and Ed Ruscha, along with lyrics by Stephen Sondheim, Laura Nyro, and Sylvester, among others, pulling from popular music, Broadway show tunes, the Great American Songbook, Yiddish, and film. The paintings view American art and culture of the last century through the lens of that time period's outpouring of creativity that was the result of post-war optimism, a burgeoning middle class, and democratic values. Responding to the uncertain political and ecological climate of the new century in which they have been made, Kass's work looks back on the 20th century critically and simultaneously with great nostalgia, throwing the present into high relief. Drawing, as always, from the divergent realms of art history, popular culture, political realities, and her own political and philosophical reflection, the artist continues into the present the explorations that have characterized her paintings since the 1980s in these new hybrid textual and visual works.

=== OY/YO ===
In 2015, Two Tree Management Art in Dumbo commissioned of a monumentally scaled installation of OY/YO for the Brooklyn Bridge Park. The sculpture, measuring 8×17×5 ft., consists of big yellow aluminum letters, was installed on the waterfront and was visible from the Manhattan. It spells “YO” against the backdrop of Brooklyn. The flip side, for those gazing at Manhattan, reads “OY.” An article and photo appeared on the front page of the New York Times 3 days after its installation in the park. An instant icon, OY/YO stayed at that site for 10 months where it became a tourist destination, a favorite spot for wedding, graduation, class photos and countless selfies. After its stay in Dumbo it moved to the ferry stop at North 6th Street in Williamsburg, Brooklyn for a year, where it greeted ferry riders. Since 2011, OY/YO has been a reoccurring motif in Deborah Kass's work in the form of paintings, prints, and tabletop sculptures. Kass first created “OY” as a painting riffing on Edward Ruscha’s 1962 Pop canvas, “OOF.” She later painted “YO” as a diptych that nodded to Picasso's 1901 self-portrait, “Yo Picasso” (“I, Picasso”). OY/YO is now installed in front of the Brooklyn Museum. Another arrived at Stanford University in front of the Cantor Arts Center late 2019.

A large edition of OY/YO was acquired by the Jewish Museum in New York in 2017 and is on view in the exhibition Scenes from the Collection.

=== No Kidding ===
On December 9, 2015, Deborah Kass introduced her new paintings that incorporated neon lights in an exhibition at Paul Kasmin Gallery entitled "No Kidding" in Chelsea, New York. The exhibition was an extension of her Feel Good Paintings for Feel Bad Times, but it sets a darker, tougher tone as she reflects on contemporary issues such as global warming, institutional racism, political brutality, gun violence, and attacks on women's health, through the lens of minimalism and grief. The series is ongoing.

=== Louises ===
Deborah Kass has spoken about creating an “ode to the great Louises,” a space dedicated to her works inspired by famous Louise's which she would call the “Louise Suite.” The earliest of these odes is “Sing Out Louise,” a 2002 oil on linen painting from her Feel Good Paintings Feel Bad Times collection. “Sing out Louise” is driven by her fondness for Rosalind Russel and the fact Kass feels it is her time to “Sing Out”. “After Louise Bourgeois” is a 2010 sculpture made of neon and transformers on powder-coated aluminum monolith; it is a spiraling neon light with a phrase inspired by French-American artist Louise Bourgeois. The neon installation reads “A woman has no place in the art world unless she proves over and over again that she won’t be eliminated.” Kass changed the quote slightly to better represent her beliefs but it was derived from Bourgeois. “After Louise Nevelson” is a 2020 spiraling neon work of art that reads "Anger? I'd be dead without my anger" a quote from American sculptor, Louise Nevelson.

== Collections (selection) ==
Deborah Kass's work is featured in the permanent holdings of several collecting institutions worldwide including the Jewish Museum, New York, the Pérez Art Museum Miami, Florida, the Whitney Museum of American Art, New York, the Museum of Fine Arts, Boston, Massachusetts, and the National Gallery of Art, Washington DC, among many others.

== Personal life ==
Deborah Kass married artist Patricia Anne Cronin in July 2011. Cronin is a professor of art at Brooklyn College. She graduated from Rhode Island College, got and MFA in painting from Brooklyn College, and studied at both the Yale Summer School of Art and Music and the Skowhegan School of Art.

== Award and Grants ==
- Honorary Doctor of Fine Arts, Carnegie Mellon University, School of Art (2025)
- Spirit of Achievement Trailblazer Award, Montefiore Albert Einstein College of Medicine (2024)
- Honoree, The Jewish Museum (2017)
- New York Foundation for the Arts, inducted into NYFA Hall of Fame (2014)
- Art Matters Inc. Grant (1996)
- Art Matters Inc. Grant (1992)
- New York Foundation for the Arts, Fellowship in Painting 1987 National Endowment for the Arts, Painting (1991)
- National Endowment For The Arts (1987)

== Selected books ==
2012: Shiner, Eric C., with Lisa Liebman, Brooks Adams, Griselda Pollock, Irving Sandler, Robert Storr and John Waters, 'Deborah Kass: Before and Happily Ever After,' Rizzoli, New York.

2010: Katz, Jonathan D. and David C. Ward, eds., HIDE/ SEEK: Difference and Desire in American Portraiture, exhibition catalog, Smithsonian Books, Washington DC

2006: Wagner, Frank, Kasper Konig, Julia Freidrich, eds., The Eighth Square, Gender, Life, and Desire in the Arts since 1960, exhibition catalog, Museum Ludwig, Hatje Cantz Verlag, Germany

2006: Bloom, Lisa, Jewish Identities in American Feminist Art, Routledge, New York, NY

2004: Higgs, Matthew, Likeness: Portraits of Artists by Other Artists, exhibition catalogue, CAA Wattis Institute for Contemporary Art and Independent Curators International, San Francisco, CA

1999: Plante, Michael, ed. (with essays by Maurice Berger, Linda Nochlin, Robert Rosenblum, and Mary Anne Staniszewski), Deborah Kass: The Warhol Project, exhibition catalog, Newcombe Art Gallery, Tulane University, New Orleans, LA

1998: Bright, Deborah, ed., The Passionate Camera, Photography and Bodies of Desire, Routledge, New York, NY

1997: Schor, Mira, Wet, On Painting, Feminism, and Art Culture, Duke University Press, Durham, NC

1996: Kleeblatt, Norman L and Linda Nochlin, Too Jewish?: Challenging Traditional Identities, exhibition catalog, Rutgers University Press, New Brunswick, NJ

1996: James, Jamie, Pop Art Colour Library, Phaidon Press Ltd., London, England

1995: Blake, Nayland, Lawrence Rinder, Amy Scholder, eds., In A Different Light; Visual Culture, Sexual Identity, Queer Practice, exhibition catalogue, City Lights Books, San Francisco, CA

1993: Chernow, Barbara A. and George A. Vallasi, eds., "American Art," The Columbia Encyclopedia, Fifth Edition, Columbia University Press, Houghton Mifflin Company, Boston, MA
