= Sedliště (Plzeň-South District) =

Municipality in Plzeň Region, Czech Republic

- Municipality
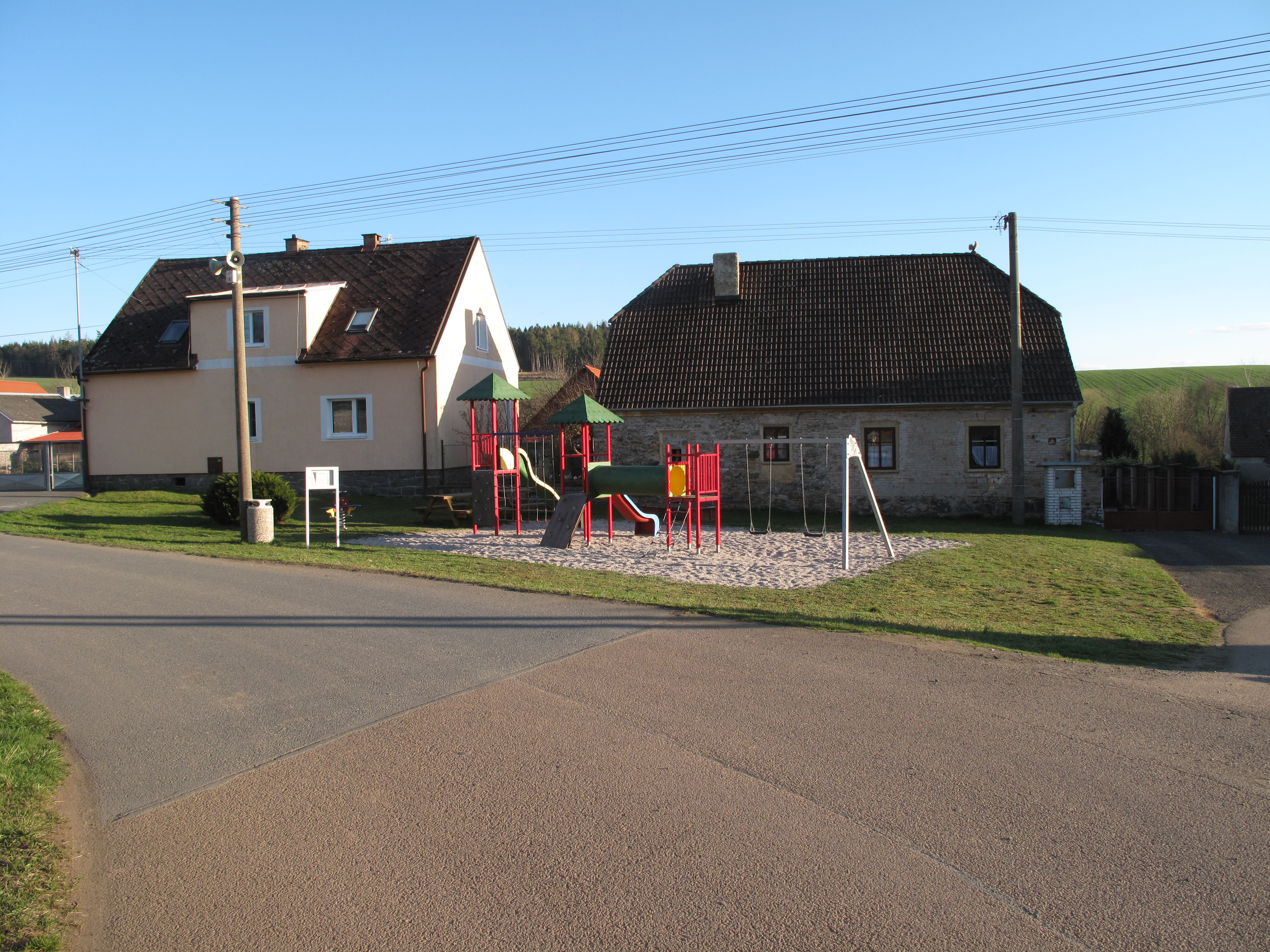
- Playground in the centre of Sedliště

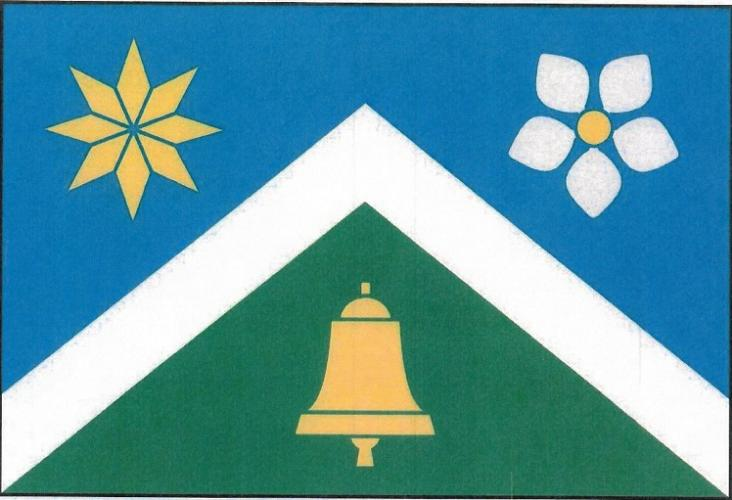
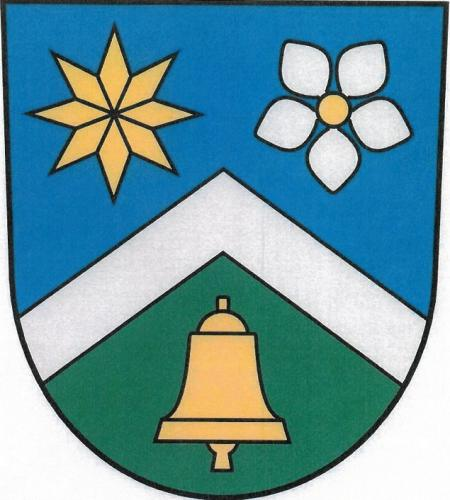
- Flag Coat of arms

- Location in the Czech Republic
- Coordinates: 49°31′39″N 13°37′56″E
- Country: Czech Republic
- Region: Plzeň
- District: Plzeň-South
- First mentioned: 1552

Area
  - Total: 7.33 km^{2} (2.83 sq mi)
- Elevation: 446 m (1,463 ft)

Population (2026-01-01)
  - Total: 132
  - Density: 18.0/km^{2} (46.6/sq mi)
- Time zone: UTC+1 (CET)
  - Summer (DST): UTC+2 (CEST)
- Postal code: 335 01
- Website: www.ousedliste.cz

Sedliště is a municipality and village in Plzeň-South District in the Plzeň Region of the Czech Republic. It has about 100 inhabitants.

== Etymology ==
The Old Czech word sedliště (related to the modern Czech words usadit se = 'to settle down' and osada = 'hamlet', 'settlement') denoted a place where someone settled.

== Geography ==
Sedliště is located about 28 km (17 mi) southeast of Plzeň. It lies in the Švihov Highlands. The highest point is at 586 m (1,923 ft) above sea level. The brook Čížkovský potok flows through the municipality.

== History ==
The first written mention of Sedliště is from 1552. The village belonged to the Zelená Hora estate.

== Demographics ==
Historical population

Year	Pop.	±%
1869	328	—
1880	358	+9.1%
1890	329	−8.1%
1900	341	+3.6%
1910	377	+10.6%

Year	Pop.	±%
1921	387	+2.7%
1930	366	−5.4%
1950	263	−28.1%
1961	253	−3.8%
1970	224	−11.5%

Year	Pop.	±%
1980	188	−16.1%
1991	158	−16.0%
2001	129	−18.4%
2011	103	−20.2%
2021	115	+11.7%

Source: Censuses

== Transport ==
There are no railways or major roads passing through the municipality.

== Sights ==
There are no protected cultural monuments in the municipality. In the centre of Sedlište is a chapel from the second half of the 19th century.
