= Karel Píč =

- Born: 6 December 1920; Litomyšl
- Died: 15 August 1995 (aged 74); Litomyšl
- Resting place: The Litomyšl Cemetery
- Occupation: writer
- Writing career
- Pen name: Karolo Piĉ
- Language: Czech, Esperanto
- Genre: Esperanto novels
- Notable work: La Litomiŝla tombejo

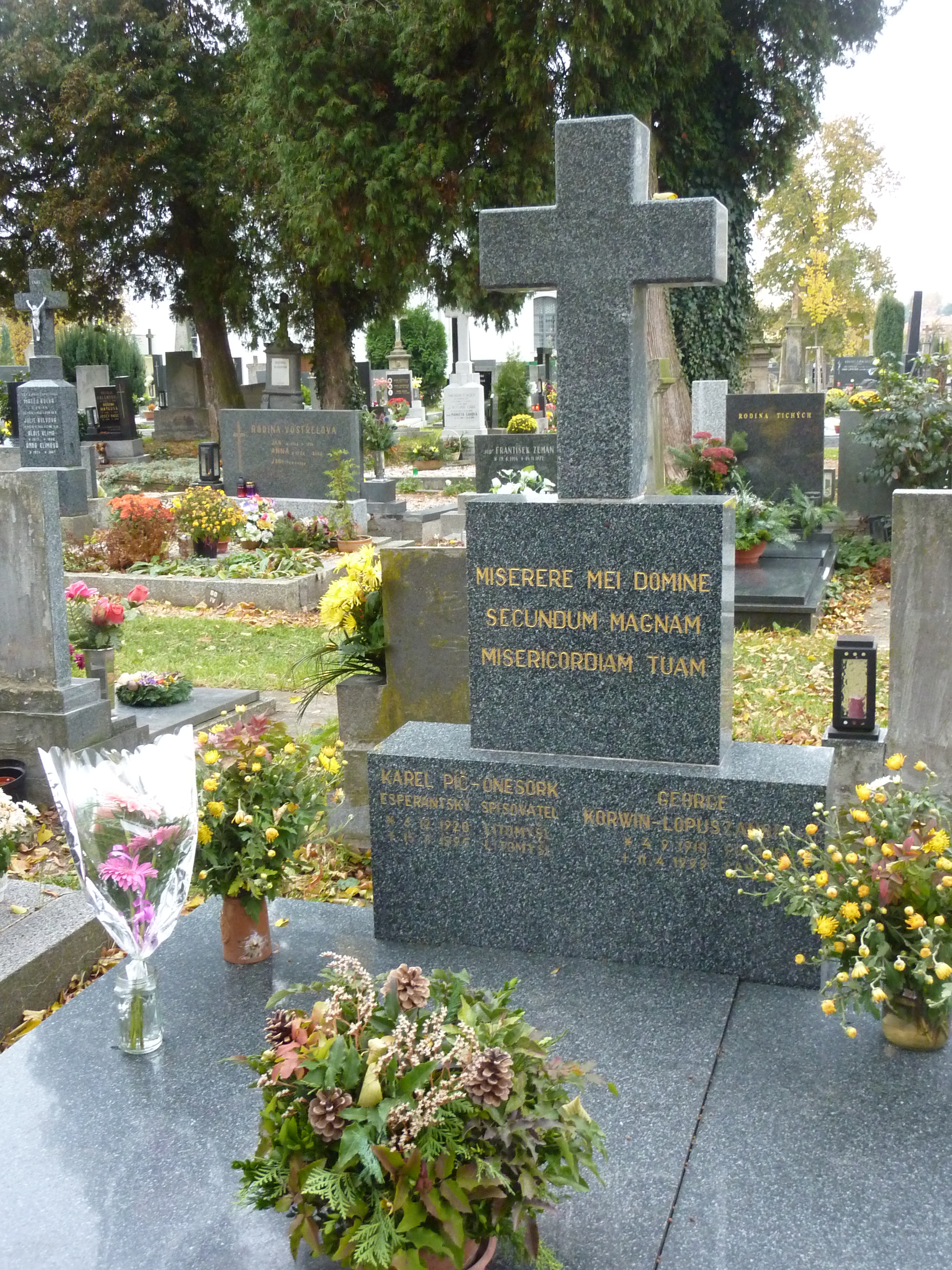
Karel Píč's grave at the Litomyšl cemetery

Karel Píč (Esperanto: Karolo Piĉ; 6 December 1920 – 15 August 1995) was a leading Czech Esperantist, a member of the Academy of Esperanto, a poet and writer of short stories, essays, and novels in Esperanto.

== Role in Esperanto literature ==
Karel Píč was a famous and influential Esperanto author. He introduced and used many neologisms, which was controversial. Aside from neologisms, he was noted for his experimental usage of Esperanto; some commentators go so far as to call his usage "piĉido" and imply it is almost another language.

His best known work, epitomizing his linguistic experimentation, is the semi-autobiographical novel La Litomiŝla tombejo (The Litomyšl Cemetery) (1981) set in his hometown of Litomyšl. Upon his death, Píč was buried in that cemetery, and his tombstone bears the Czech words “Esperantský spisovatel” (“Esperanto writer”).

The "Concise Encyclopedia of the Original Literature of Esperanto" quotes several influential Esperantists about the importance of La Litomiŝla tombejo. Osmo Buller wrote "it is something truly important in Esperanto literature", and Jorge Camacho claimed it as "probably the highest achievement of [Esperanto's] original literature". Esperanto poet William Auld included the novel on his list of Esperanto classics.

== Publications ==
- Short stories
  - Ekkrioj de Georgino (Georgia's Cries)
  - Fabeloj el transe (Fables from the Other Side)
  - La Davida harpo (David's Harp)
  - Aboco (ABC)
  - Angoro (Anguish)
- Novels
  - La Litomiŝla tombejo (The Litomyšl Cemetery)
  - Ordeno de verkistoj (The Order of Writers - published posthumously in 1997)
  - Mistero de tri unuoj (The Mystery of Three Ones)
  - La Bermuda triangulo (The Bermuda Triangle)
  - Klaĉejo (Nest of Gossip)
- Articles
  - La granda superstiĉo (The Grand Superstition)
- Essays
  - Kritiko kaj recenzistiko en Esperanto (Criticism and the Art of Reviewing in Esperanto)
  - La interna vivo de Esperanto (The Inner Life of Esperanto)
  - Esperantaj neologismoj (Esperanto Neologisms, Esperantista 1949, pp. 57, 65)
