= Patricia Cronin =

American painter

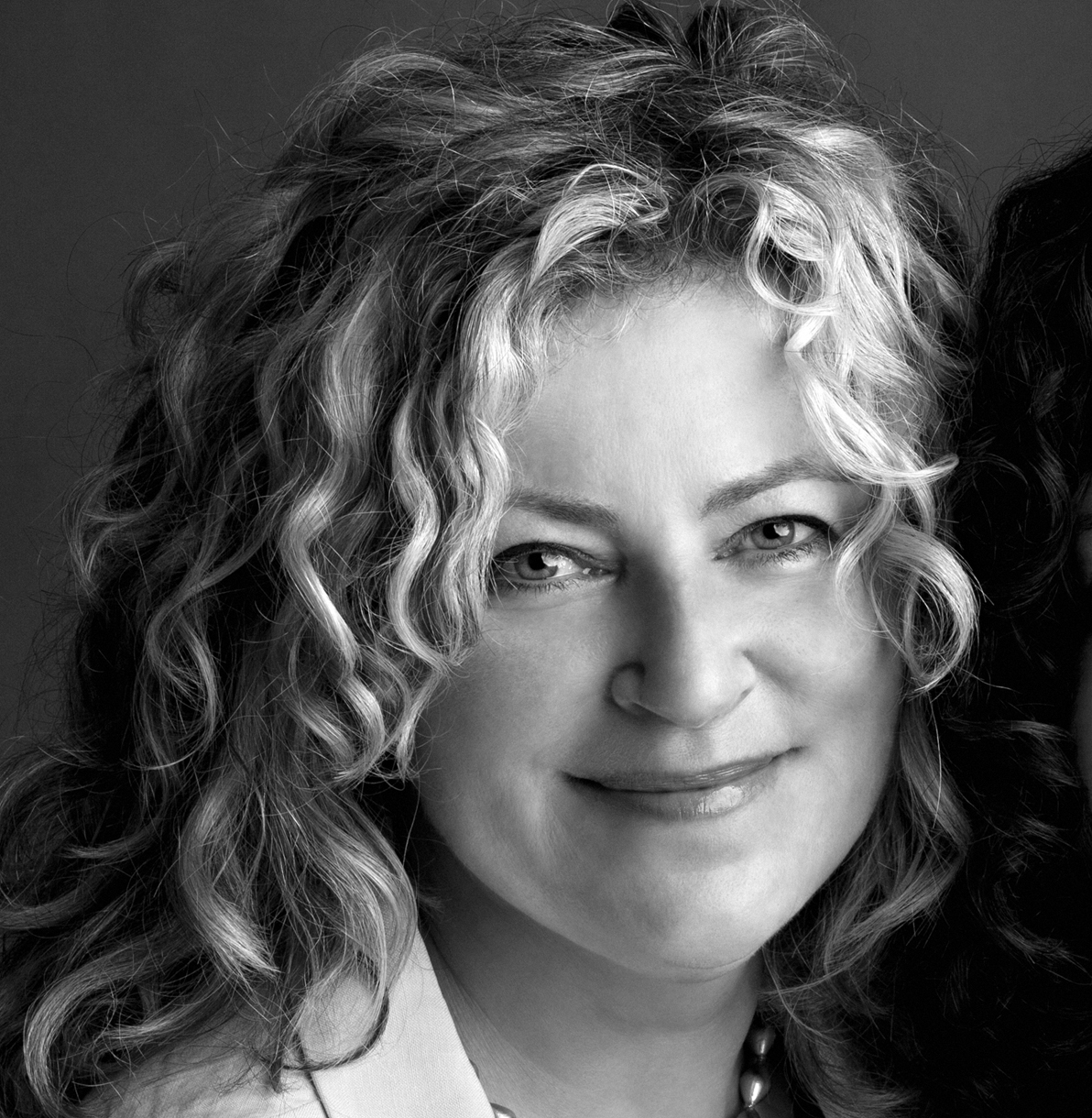
- Born: 1963 (age 62–63); Beverly, Massachusetts
- Education: Rhode Island College; Brooklyn College; Skowhegan School of Painting and Sculpture; Yale University Summer School of Art and Music, Norfolk
- Known for: Painting, Sculpture
- Notable work: Memorial To A Marriage, Shrine For Girls, Aphrodite Reimagined, Harriet Hosmer Catalogue Raisonné
- Awards: Rome Prize from the American Academy in Rome; Civitella Ranieri Foundation Fellowship; Louis Comfort Tiffany Foundation Grant; Anonymous Was a Woman Foundation Award; New York Foundation for the Arts, Artist Fellowship; Pollock-Krasner Foundation Grant

Patricia Cronin (born in 1963 in Beverly, Massachusetts) is a New York-based feminist cross-disciplinary artist. Since the early-1990s, Cronin has garnered international attention for her photographs, paintings and sculptures that address contemporary human rights issues. Cronin's conceptual artistic practice transits across many aesthetic platforms addressing social justice issues of gender, sexuality and class, including: lesbian visibility, feminist art history, marriage equality and international rights of women and LGBTQ+ people. She subverts traditional art images and forms in a wide range of two and three-dimensional time-honored artists' materials and breathes new life into these images and forms by injecting her specific political content. Her critically acclaimed statue, "Memorial To A Marriage", is the first and only marriage equality monument in the world. A 3-ton Carrara marble mortuary sculpture of her life partner and herself was made before gay marriage was legal in the U.S., and has been exhibited widely across the country and abroad. Cronin began her career working for the Anne Frank Stichting (Foundation) in Amsterdam installing the traveling exhibition "Anne Frank in the World" in Europe and the U.S. Giving presence to female absence is a consistent thread that runs through and connects each body of work.

== Life and work ==
Cronin received her BFA from the Rhode Island College in 1986 and received an MFA from Brooklyn College in 1988 where she studied with Lee Bontecou, Allan D'Arcangelo, Lois Dodd, Philip Pearlstein, and William T. Williams. Cronin also studied at the Yale University Summer School of Music and Art, Norfolk Fellowship Program in 1985 and the Skowhegan School of Painting and Sculpture in 1991.

Cronin has had solo exhibitions at the American Academy in Rome, Musei Capitolini, Centrale Montemartini Museo, Rome, Italy, the Brooklyn Museum, Deitch Projects, and Brent Sikkema (now Sikkema Jenkins & Co.). Two survey exhibitions of her work have been organized; Patricia Cronin, The Domain of Perfect Affection, 1993 to 2003, UB Art Gallery, University at Buffalo, Buffalo, NY and Patricia Cronin, All Is Not Lost, 2000–2009, Tulane University, New Orleans, LA which was supported by The Andy Warhol Foundation for the Visual Arts.

Cronin's work is in the permanent collections of the National Gallery of Art and Smithsonian National Portrait Gallery, both in Washington, DC, Deutsche Bank, New York, NY, Perez Art Museum Miami, Miami, FL, The Gallery of Modern Art (GoMA), Kelvingrove Art Gallery and Museum, both in Glasgow, Scotland Tampa Museum of Art.

Cronin is the recipient of numerous awards and grants, including the Rome Prize Fellowship in Visual Art from the American Academy in Rome, Louis Comfort Tiffany Foundation Grant, two Pollock-Krasner Foundation grants, Anonymous Was A Woman Foundation Award and the Civitella Ranieri Foundation] Fellowship. Cronin has served as a Trustee on the Boards of the American Academy in Rome and the Civitella Ranieri Foundation. A frequent juror of numerous arts organizations, she has also chaired and served on the College Art Association's Artist's Lifetime Achievement Award.

Cronin has lectured extensively at many U.S. and international museums, including: the Victoria and Albert Museum in London, United Kingdom; Kelvingrove Art Gallery and Museum, Glasgow, Scotland, the Museum of Modern Art, New York, the Brooklyn Museum, Christie's, New York, Smithsonian National Portrait Gallery, Washington, DC, Museum of Fine Arts, Boston and the Venice Biennale, Venice, Italy. In 1994 she organized the panel "Lesbian Subjectivities" at The Drawing Center, New York, NY and guest edited the corresponding issue of Art Papers.

She has taught at many art schools and in the Graduate Art Programs at both Columbia University and Yale University. Since 2003 she has been a professor of art at Brooklyn College of The City University of New York, including Claire and Leonard Tow Professorships (2013-14) (2018-2020). In July 2023 The City University of New York Board of Trustees appointed Cronin to Distinguished Professor of Art.

=== Erotic Polaroids and watercolors (1992–1999) ===
In these early works that blend performance and documentation, Cronin depicts the subject of explicit female sexuality in a way that both extends and critiques the role of sexuality throughout art's history. Curator Sandra Firmin observed, "in contrast to her contemporary, photographer Catherine Opie, who received critical acclaim for her dignified studio portraiture of queer leather communities in California, Cronin's snapshots are taken in the frenzy of participation. Emerging concurrently in the early 1990s, both Cronin and Opie offer a lesbian counterpart to Robert Mapplethorpe's controversial X Portfolio from the late 1970s and early 1980s, which filtered multiracial sex acts and sadomasochism through a highly disciplined language of formal photography, merging homoerotic pornography and high art in the process." These works give voice to a particular experience (that of Cronin herself, whose vantage point as a participant is purposefully utilized throughout the work) while simultaneously speaking to larger questions regarding queer, lesbian or feminist subjectivities and the extent to which they are truly or accurately articulated and represented in artistic practice at large.

Boys and Girls from the Erotic Polaroid series were part of the exhibition Coming To Power: 25 Years of Sexually X-plicit Art by Women, which pays homage to the first generation of women artists who pioneered a new artistic genre in the mid-1960s and early 1970s using explicit sexual imagery and also presents the work of a younger generation of female artists that elicit sexual excitement as well as express autonomous pleasure, passion and pain. The exhibition was conceived by Cronin and fellow artist, Ellen Cantor, during their time at Skowhegan School of Art in the summer of 1991 and their curatorial collaboration including studio visits, venue meetings and fundraising efforts on the project continued through 1993. Due to a disagreement with Cantor over a #metoo incident Cronin had with a museum director, she walked away from the project and their exhibition was presented a few months later at the David Zwirner Gallery listing Cantor as the sole curator.

=== Pony Tales and Tack Room (1996–1998) ===
Cronin uses the "equestrian lifestyle" as a lens through which to see sexuality and class. In Pony Tales, Cronin interrogated the boundaries and possibilities of portraiture by focusing on a non-human subject, horses. Drawing inspiration from her own fascination with the species, as well as the popular literature and cult surrounding them, Cronin painted individual equestrian portraits that speak to how cultural fascination and fetishization create social values. Framed in walnut and installed on Schumacher's "Summer Country Archive" wallpaper, this body of work debuted at Sikkema Gallery, and was also shown at Real Art Ways, University of North Carolina at Chapel Hill, and UB Art Gallery at SUNY Buffalo.

Along with these portraits, an upper class equestrian socio-economic meilleure blending real estate and subversive female empowerment also inspired Tack Room (1997–98), an architectural environment where Cronin built a life-size stable complete with all the equestrian accouterments including: saddles, bridles, equestrian clothing, blankets, training books, first aid and art. After closer viewing, the smell of leather and hay permeates the installation and suede chaps, leather bridles and metal bits, whips and paddles accumulated suggest a more sexual reading and open up Cronin's fantasy of what an architectural space where female sexuality isn't ridiculed, but rather celebrated could look like. The work was exhibited at White Columns (1998) and was one of the top ten shows of 1998 by art critic Lisa Liebmann in Artforum. It was also presented at The Armory Show (2017) in the curated section of large installations, Platform, curated by Eric Shiner and was shown again in "Horses?" exhibition at Chart gallery in Tribeca (July 9 - September, 2021).

=== Luxury real estate paintings (2000–2001) ===
Continuing her interest in how cultural meaning is enshrined and propagated, Cronin turned her attention to the real estate market. This series depicts lavish, expansive and expensive homes and estates titled with the price and location of each estate (i.e., "$10,000,000 (Southampton)"). These small-scaled works, no larger than nine by fifteen inches, recall intimate real estate listings that ironically belie the actual expansion of the houses they advertise. Cronin used listings in Sotheby's International Realty as her source material, a conscious choice that raises questions about class and its relationship to fine art markets, controlled and regulated by auction houses like Sotheby's. The works were shown at Cronin's solo survey exhibition The Domain of Perfect Affection: 1993–2003 at the University at Buffalo Art Gallery in 2004 and in Looking At America exhibition at the Yale University Art Gallery, New Haven, CT, in 2002.

=== Memorial To A Marriage (2002) ===
To address the lack of women represented in public monuments and same sex marriage being illegal Cronin created Memorial To A Marriage, the first Marriage Equality monument in the world. In 2001, the Kansas City-based arts organization Grand Arts awarded Cronin an Artist's Project Grant to create Memorial To A Marriage, a three-ton Carrara marble mortuary statue of Cronin and her partner, the artist, Deborah Kass. The two women, a lesbian couple, depicted recumbent in an entwined embrace on a bed. As Institute of Contemporary Art, Boston former chief curator Helen Molesworth writes, the work "traffics in love and death, and in the intimate relations between these two structuring poles of human existence." Utilizing a patriotic form, American Neo-classical sculpture, to address a federal failure (the prohibition of gay marriage), Memorial to a Marriage balances visual poetry with political protest. Although now legal, marriage equality remains an extremely contentious political and social issue in the United States.

Completed in 2002 when gay marriage was illegal in the U.S., the only legal protections available to gay and lesbian couples were about death: wills and health care proxies. Cronin created the marble mortuary statue of the two lovers, a decade before the Supreme Court struck down the Defense of Marriage Act in 2012. The art historian Robert Rosenblum described the work as "so imaginative a leap into an artist's personal life and so revolutionary a monument in terms of social history that it demands a full scale monograph." He named the installation as one of the ten best shows of 2003 in Art Forum.

With the help of Deitch Projects, Cronin purchased and installed the marble sculpture in 2002 on the couple's actual personal burial plot at Woodlawn Cemetery in the Bronx, NY, a National Historic Landmark. Woodlawn was designed in 1863 as America's Père Lachaise Cemetery and is one of the best examples of the nineteenth-century garden cemetery movement. It is the resting place for many historic figures including artists, writers, civic leaders, entrepreneurs, great entertainers and jazz musicians everyone from Elizabeth Cady Stanton, Madame C. J. Walker, J.P. Morgan, Joseph Pulitzer, to Herman Melville and numerous mausoleums designed by architects McKim, Mead & White and John Russell Pope with Louis Comfort Tiffany and John LaFarge stained glass windows.

Memorial to a Marriage has been included in over 40 exhibitions in the U.S. and abroad, including the Brooklyn Museum, Palmer Museum of Art, Neuberger Museum of Art, Contemporary Arts Center in Cincinnati, The FLAG Art Foundation, New York, Gallery of Modern Art, Glasgow, Scotland and the American Academy in Rome, Rome, Italy. It is in several museum permanent collections, including Smithsonian National Portrait Gallery, Washington, DC, Perez Art Museum Miami, Miami, FL and Kelvingrove Art Gallery and Museum, Glasgow, Scotland where it is on permanent view. Memorial to a Marriage has been written about extensively in many publications and also the subject in two Ph.D. dissertations as well as in and on the cover of Routledge's "Museums, Equality and Social Justice" book.

In 2022, Memorial To A Marriage, became the centerpiece in the world's first VR LGBTQ+ Museum debuting at the Tribeca Film Festival and winning the prestigious New Voices Award in the Immersive Competition.

November 3, 2022 marked the 20th anniversary of the statue's unveiling and was commemorated at Woodlawn Cemetery with historic tours, talks at the site and a symposium at the Woolworth Chapel with art historians Maura Reilly, Ph.D., Director of the Zimmerli Art Museum, Rutgers University and Harriet F. Senie, Ph.D., professor emerita City College and Graduate Center, CUNY.

=== Harriet Hosmer: Lost and Found (2009) ===
Cronin won the Rome Prize for her series on Harriet Hosmer, an American expatriate who moved to Rome in 1852 and subsequently became known as the first professional woman sculptor The result of her research that year was the production of a catalogue raisonné for which Cronin took on the roles of historian, artist and curator as she herself compiled art historical research on Hosmer, illustrated the book with her own watercolors and wrote descriptions of each work.

As Maura Reilly, founding curator of the Elizabeth A. Sackler Center for Feminist Art at the Brooklyn Museum, writes, Cronin's complex role as an artist raises questions such as "in choosing a female artist, one who was famous in her day yet relatively unknown today, Cronin's deconstructivist project diverges from her previous interventionist project, Memorial To A Marriage. With the Hosmer project she is highlighting instead the canon of art history's exclusions and inclusions, thereby figuring forth its discriminatory practices and sexist foundations that make it acceptable for certain artists – male – to be raised to the canon's heights and others not."

The catalogue combines hand painted images with art historical research to create a document that reveals the complexities of Hosmer's career, reputation, and legacy. Hosmer moved to Rome in 1852 and lived among a community of British and American artists and writers and a circle of learned and well-to-do "independent women." Hosmer had an important career, was praised by critics, won competitive commissions, and earned enormous sums for her sculptures. In this unique catalogue, Cronin pieces together a conceptual framework to examine the histories of art and women at the intersection of the ivory tower and the marketplace.

This is particularly evident in Cronin's handling of the works for which visual images do not exist. In these cases, in place of a physical likeness, Cronin depicts what art historian Alexander Nemerov describes as ghosts and Cronin herself calls "phantoms." In these moments of absence the viewer is made aware of the built in impossibility of the project which, with these watercolors, become part of its subject and thus speaks directly to the legacy of feminist art and its implication in contemporary artistic practice.

The work was exhibited at the Elizabeth A. Sackler Center for Feminist Art, Brooklyn Museum in 2009–10. Reviewing the show in The New York Times, Pulitzer Prize winning art critic Holland Cotter wrote, "In short, Ms. Cronin's Hosmer show – organized by Lauren Ross, interim curator of the Sackler Center – is a complex package: a total work of art that is also a historical document of the careers of two artists, past and present, and a salvage operation to secure the visibility of both artists over time."

=== Dante: The Way of All Flesh (2012) ===
Cronin's ongoing relationship to Italian art history and literature has continued past her Rome Prize year at the American Academy in Rome. After the 2008 financial crisis, Cronin felt a need for a new humanism, which she has integrated into her artistic practice. Cronin turned to Dante's Inferno as a point of departure for a series of expressive figurative oil paintings, watercolors and bleach portraits of corrupt politicians and religious leaders. The series shows her expanding on recurring themes – whose life has value and who decides, church or state – while simultaneously drawing on the classic work to elaborate on Dante's allegorical timeless story of a cautionary tale largely gone unheeded. Elizabeth Kley writes in ARTnews, "Untitled (2012) is a 16-part grid of watercolors created by bleaching red and orange paper. Inspired by Dante's lineup of named Renaissance malefactors, they are portraits of contemporary power mongers who've committed the sins that Cronin (and Dante) consider most heinous; fraud, treachery, and betrayal."

=== Le Macchine, Gli Dei e I Fantasmi (2013) ===
For her 2013 exhibition (Machines, Gods and Ghosts), Cronin was the first contemporary artist invited to use the historic venue at the Musei Capitolini's converted powerplant Centrale Montemartini Museo in Rome and re-conceptualize many of the concerns of her earlier work. Curated by Ludovico Pratesi, conceived specifically for the museum's Engine Room, this industrial archaeology commingled with the Capitoline Museums' Classical sculpture collection and the "phantoms" or "ghosts" from Cronin's Hosmer project. Using a 21st-century printing technique, dye sublimation enlarged on silk, these panels hung throughout the space slowly undulating, these new pieces further highlight the evocative juxtaposition of anachronic pairings of classical sculptures and their modern surroundings and in their contrasting materiality and formalism, underscore questions of absence and omission as they relate to the history, art and civilization including the anonymous artists that carved the Classical marble sculptures and the anonymous missed workers who are no longer employed at the power plant. If Cronin's work on Harriet Hosmer asked the important question of who and what gets remembered in Art History, then this newest project stresses how contemporary art might also be utilized to ask this same question. The show was accompanied by a catalogue, published by Silvana Editoriale, with essays in both Italian and English written by Peter Benson Miller and Ludovico Pratesi.

=== Shrine for Girls, Venice (2015) ===
Shrine for Girls, Venice is a solo Collateral Event of the 56th International Art Exhibition – la Biennale di Venezia 2015 (May 5 - November 22, 2015). Inside the sixteenth-century Church of San Gallo, this dramatic site-specific installation focuses on the global plight of women and girls, often facing violence, repression and forced ignorance, and is a shrine in their honor. Shrines, part of every major religion's practice, provide a space for contemplation, petition and rituals of remembrance. Here, Cronin gathered hundreds of girls' humble clothes from around the world to reference specific tragic events in India and Nigeria, as well as, the United Kingdom and the United States, and arranged them on three stone altars to act as relics of these young martyrs. Juxtaposing brightly colored saris like those worn by gang raped and murdered girls in India, muted palettes of hijabs worn by the students kidnapped by Boko Haram in Nigeria and ghost-like values of aprons from the Magdalene Laundries in the UK and US with the richness of the marble and wood paneled church interior opens up a space for refuge and reflection in the face of human tragedy. Shrine for Girls, Venice proposes a new dialogue between gender, memory and justice. Julie Belcove writes in the Financial Times, "The pared-down presentation demands quiet reflection, and the piece's emotional power, Cronin hopes, will derive from viewers' intuitive comprehension of what is absent."

=== Shrine for Girls, New York (2016) ===
After the Venice presentation, Shrine for Girls began an international tour at The FLAG Art Foundation, New York (June 9 – August 12, 2016). "Moving from the marble altars and sacred architecture of Venice's sixteenth-century Chiesa di San Gallo to the secular gallery context of FLAG, Cronin will present the same three fabric sculptures, here piled on top of their shipping crates to now address human trafficking as well as human rights issues. The installation of clothing, of what the missing bodies would have inhabited, provokes an emotional and visceral response to what is absent. Small photographs of each tragedy accompany the sculptures and provide very real context for the work. A new series of watercolor portraits place a human face on tragedy and amplify the 'identifiable victim effect,' drawing our attention away from statistics to the magnitude of the individual loss and unrealized human potential."

=== Shrine for Girls, Dublin (2017) ===
In June 2017 Shrine for Girls then traveled to Ireland, curated by Sheena Barrett at The LAB Gallery in Dublin (June 16 - August 20, 2017). The gallery is notably around the corner from the last Magdalene Laundry to close, the subject of one of the fabric sculptures. Moving from the sacred to secular architecture the work courses within the architecture of the powerful providing a stark contrast with her subjects, the powerless. Three oil portraits of a girl from each tragedy was exhibited in an intimate gallery away from the altars.

=== Shrine for Girls, Utrecht (2021-2022) ===
The Shrine For Girls (United Kingdom) "altar" and portrait painting, Magdalene Laundry Girl, is included in the Mary Magdalene exhibition at Museum Catherijne Convent, Utrecht, The Netherlands (June 24, 2021 - January 9, 2022) curated by Dr. Lieke Wijnia, exploring the many interpretations of Mary Magdalene from the Middle Ages to Today with Cronin, Kiki Smith and Marlene Dumas.

=== Aphrodite: Reimagined, (2018) ===
"Aphrodite Reimagined," is a 10-foot monumental sculpture commissioned for the exhibition Patricia Cronin, Aphrodite, and the Lure of Antiquity: Conversations with the Collection, at the Tampa Museum of Art. It is the inaugural exhibition (August 16, 2018 - January 6, 2019) in a biennial series, Conversations with the Collection exploring synergy between the museum's collection of antiquities and modern and contemporary work. Aphrodite, Reimagined is the artist's vision of the goddess Aphrodite, inspired by a fragment of a marble torso from 1st century AD in the museum's collection. Recreated on an Ancient Cult statue monumental scale in cold-cast marble, the torso now has a head, arms, and legs hand modeled and cast in resin the pale shade of aquamarine blue green, like beach glass. Mimicking the drapery and posture of the original statue, Cronin's version reads as both ancient and modern simultaneously, allowing contemporary viewers to gaze upward at the classical figure, a female authority in public, just as ancient audiences once did in columned-filled temples. "History is never going to be finished, said Cronin. "We have to evaluate the past and help us find our way to the future." Also included in the exhibition are a new series of multi-layered assemblage paintings and glass sculpture. It marks the first time the artist has ever worked in resin and glass.

The Tampa Museum of Art announced their acquisition of Aphrodite Reimagined into their permanent collection on March 24, 2021.

== Notable exhibitions ==
- 2018 Patricia Cronin, Aphrodite and the Lure of Antiquity, Tampa Museum of Art, Tampa, FL
- 2017 Shrine for Girls, Dublin, The LAB Gallery, Dublin, Ireland
- 2016 Shrine for Girls, New York, The FLAG Art Foundation, New York, NY
- 2015 Shrine for Girls, Venice, Collateral Event of the 56th International Art Exhibition – la Biennale di Venezia, Chiesa di San Gallo, Venice, Italy (curated by Ludovico Pratesi) (catalogue)
- 2013 Le Macchine, Gli Dei e I Fantasmi, Musei Capitolini, Centrale Montemartini Museo, Rome, Italy (curated by Ludovico Pratesi) (catalogue)
- 2012 Dante: The Way of All Flesh, Ford Project, New York, NY
- 2012 Patricia Cronin: All Is Not Lost (2000-2009), Newcomb Art Museum, Tulane University, New Orleans, LA (catalogue)
- 2009–10 Patricia Cronin: Harriet Hosmer, Lost and Found, Brooklyn Museum, Brooklyn, NY (catalogue)
- 2007 An American in Rome, American Academy in Rome Art Gallery, Rome, Italy
- 2004 Patricia Cronin, The Domain of Perfect Affection, 1993 to 2003, UB Art Gallery, University at Buffalo, Buffalo, NY (catalogue)
- 2002 Memorial To A Marriage, Deitch Projects, New York, NY
- 1998 Tack Room, White Columns, New York, NY
- 1997 Pony Tales, Brent Sikkema, New York, NY

== Books and films about Cronin ==
- Marilyn Stokstad and Michael Cothren, Art A Brief History, 7th edition, London: Pearson Educational/Prentice Hall, 2018
- Marilyn Stokstad and Michael Cothren, Art History, 6th edition, London: Pearson Educational/Prentice Hall, 2017
- Patricia Cronin: Social Justice and Aesthetic Responsibilities NYU Florence, April 2017
- Pratesi, Ludovico, Phong Bui and Maura Reilly, Patricia Cronin, Shrine For Girls, Venice, exhibition catalogue, Chiesa di San Gallo, 56th International Art Exhibition - la Biennale di Venezia 2015, Silvana Editoriale, Milan, 2015
- A Silent Protest Can Be Quite Powerful Studio International, 2015
- Pratesi, Ludovico and Peter Benson Miller, Patricia Cronin: Le Macchine, Gli Dei e I Fantasmi, exhibition catalogue, Musei Capitolini, Centrale Montemartini Museo, Silvana Editoriale, Milano, 2013
- Cronin, Patricia, The Zenobia Scandal: A Meditation on Male Jealousy, Zing Books, New York, NY, 2013
- Sandell, Richard and Eithne Nightingale, eds., Museums, Equality and Social Justice, Routledge, 2012
- Molesworth, Helen and Alexander Nemerov, Patricia Cronin: All Is Not Lost , exhibition catalogue, Newcomb Art Gallery, Tulane University, New Orleans, 2012
- Cronin, Patricia, preface by Maura Reilly and an essay by William H. Gerdts, Harriet Hosmer: Lost and Found, A Catalogue Raisonné , Charta, Milan, 2009
- Rosenblum, Robert and Sandra Firmin, Patricia Cronin: The Domain of Perfect Affection , exhibition catalogue, UB Art Gallery, University at Buffalo, SUNY, 2004
- Frankel, David, Patricia Cronin: Memorial To A Marriage, Grand Arts, Kansas City, MO, 2002
- A Perfect Affection The Gallery Channel, HD TV, Produced by Lovett Productions, 2004
