= Sedliště (Svitavy District) =

- Municipality
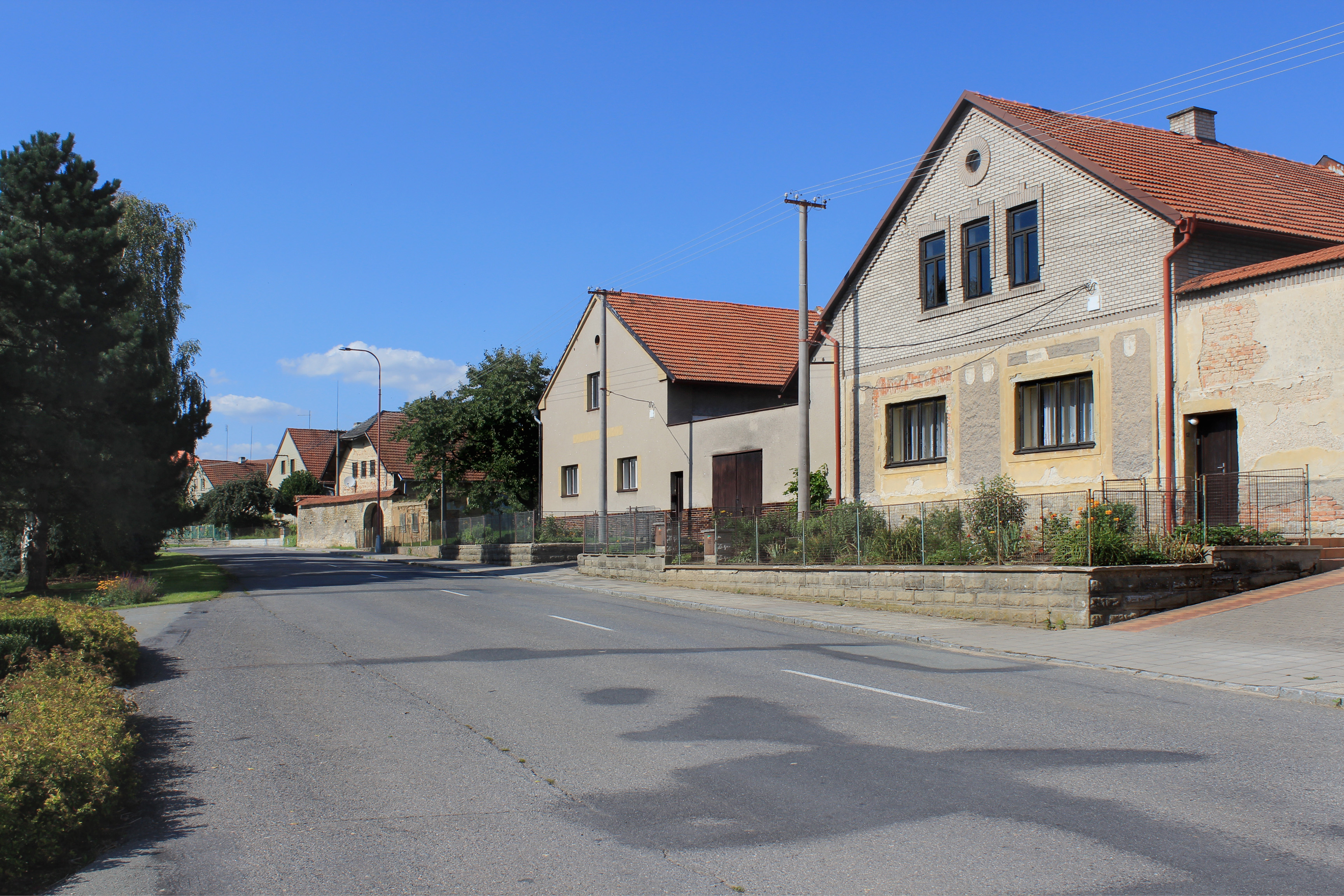
- Main road

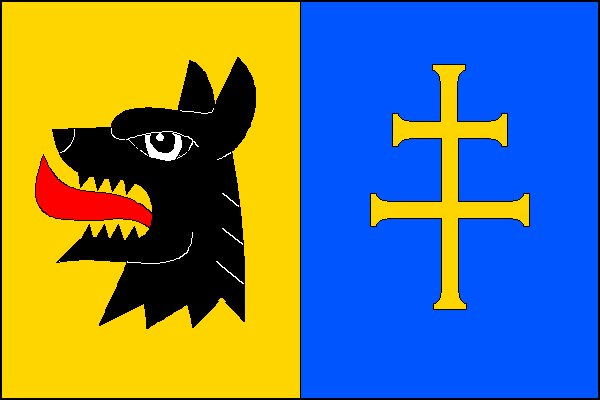
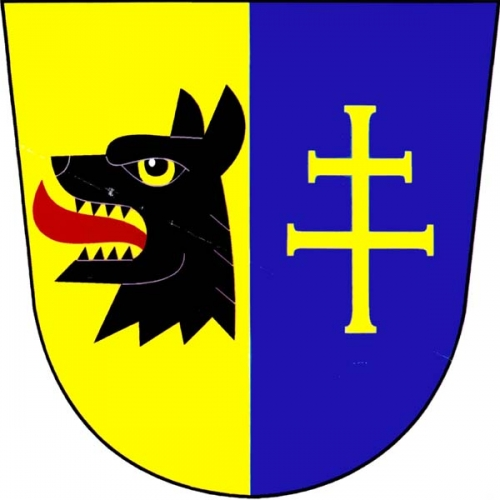
- Flag Coat of arms

- Location in the Czech Republic
- Coordinates: 49°53′38″N 16°16′30″E
- Country: Czech Republic
- Region: Pardubice
- District: Svitavy
- First mentioned: 1305

Area
  - Total: 3.69 km^{2} (1.42 sq mi)
- Elevation: 328 m (1,076 ft)

Population (2026-01-01)
  - Total: 228
  - Density: 61.8/km^{2} (160/sq mi)
- Time zone: UTC+1 (CET)
  - Summer (DST): UTC+2 (CEST)
- Postal code: 570 01
- Website: www.sedliste.net

Sedliště is a municipality and village in Svitavy District in the Pardubice Region of the Czech Republic. It has about 200 inhabitants.

Sedliště is approximately 21 kilometres (13 mi) north-west of Svitavy, 40 km (25 mi) south-east of Pardubice and 135 km (84 mi) east of Prague.

== History ==
The first written mention of Sedliště is from 1305.

== Demographics ==
Historical population
Year	Pop.	±%
1869	269	—
1880	288	+7.1%
1890	301	+4.5%
1900	295	−2.0%
1910	277	−6.1%
1921	280	+1.1%
1930	271	−3.2%
1950	230	−15.1%
1961	223	−3.0%
1970	203	−9.0%
1980	201	−1.0%
1991	215	+7.0%
2001	227	+5.6%
2011	234	+3.1%
2021	223	−4.7%
Source: Censuses
