= Norwegian University of Science and Technology =

Public university in Trondheim, Norway

- Norges teknisk-naturvitenskapelige universitet
- Former name: NTH
- Motto: Kunnskap for en bedre verden
- Motto in English: Knowledge for a better world
- Type: Public university
- Established: 1996; 30 years ago, 1870; 156 years ago
- Academic affiliations: EUA, TIME, CESAER, ATHENS, SEFI, Santander, EAIE, ESN
- Rector: Tor Grande
- Students: 43,500 (2025)
- Location: Trondheim Ålesund Gjøvik, Norway; 63°25′10″N 10°24′9″E
- Language: Norwegian, English
- Colors: NTNU-Blue
- Sporting affiliations: NTNUI
- Website: ntnu.edu (English) ntnu.no (Norwegian)

The Norwegian University of Science and Technology (NTNU; Norwegian: Norges teknisk-naturvitenskapelige universitet) is a public research university in Norway and the largest in terms of enrollment. The university's headquarters is located in Trondheim, with regional campuses in Gjøvik and Ålesund.

NTNU was inaugurated by the King-in-Council in 1996 as a result of the merger of the former University of Trondheim and other university-level institutions, with roots dating back to 1760. Later, some former university colleges were also incorporated. Depending on the ranking publication, the university typically ranks within a range of 101 and 400 globally. As of November 2022, the university boasts an approximate 9,000 employees and 42,000 students.

NTNU has the main national responsibility for education and research in engineering and technology. This is likely attributable to the fact that it is the successor of Norway's pre-eminent engineering university, the Norwegian Institute of Technology (NTH) which was established by Parliament in 1910 as Norway's national engineering university. In addition to engineering and natural sciences, the university offers higher education in other academic disciplines ranging from medicine, psychology, social sciences, the arts, teacher education, architecture and fine art. The university's academics include three Nobel laureates in physiology or medicine: Edvard Moser, May-Britt Moser and John O'Keefe.

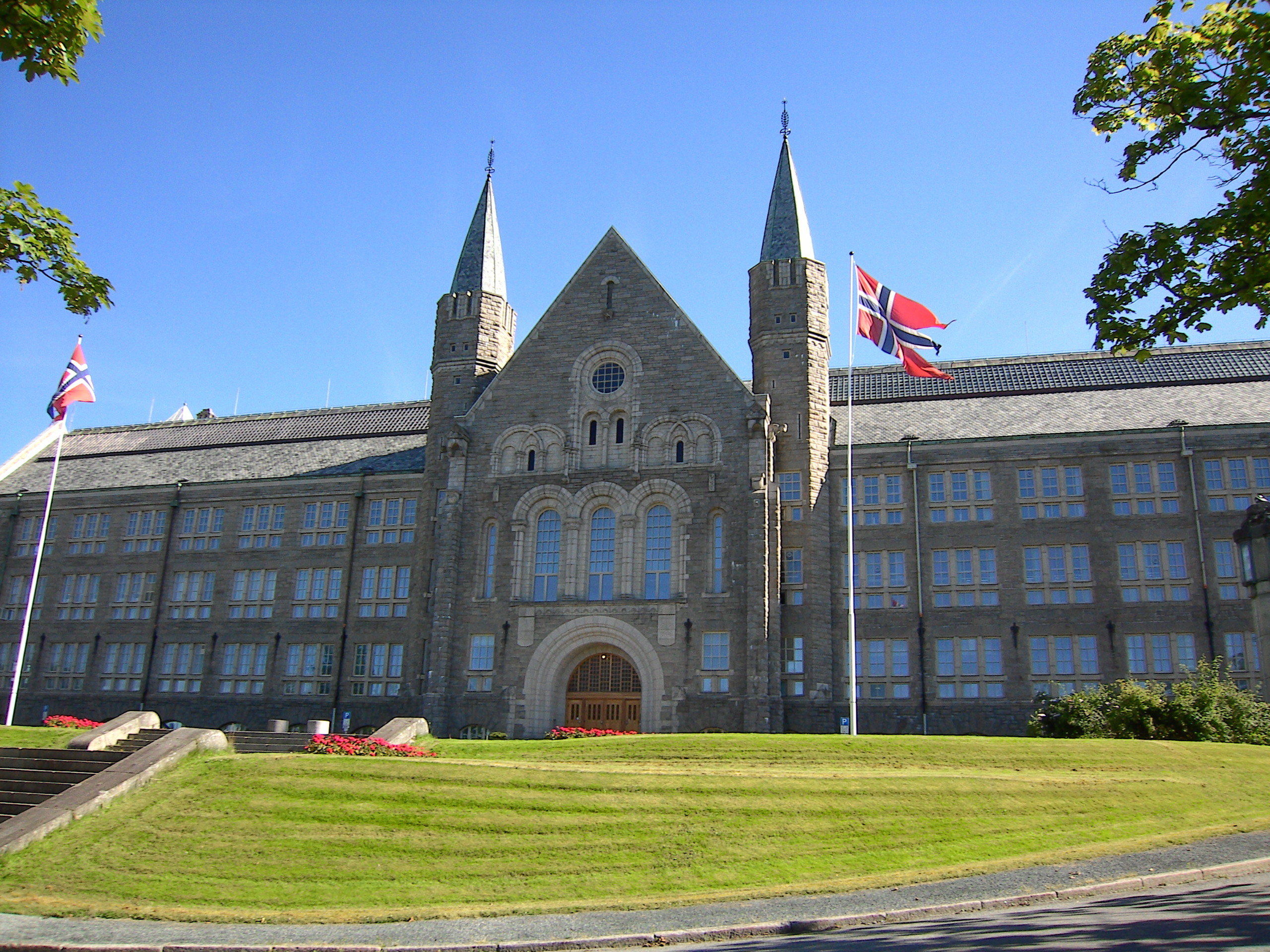
NTNU main building (Hovedbygningen) at Gløshaugen Campus, opened in 1910, which now hosts the NTNU Technology Library

== History ==
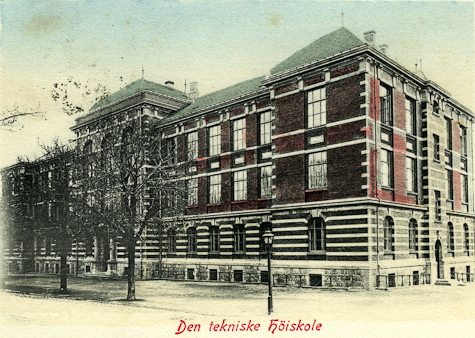
The main building of Trondheim Technical College opened in 1898.

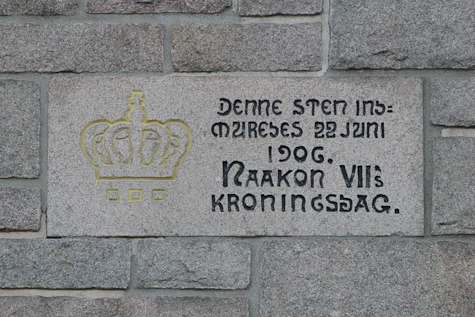
NTH memorial stone (on 22 July 1906) is mortared into NTNU main building (Hovedbygningen).

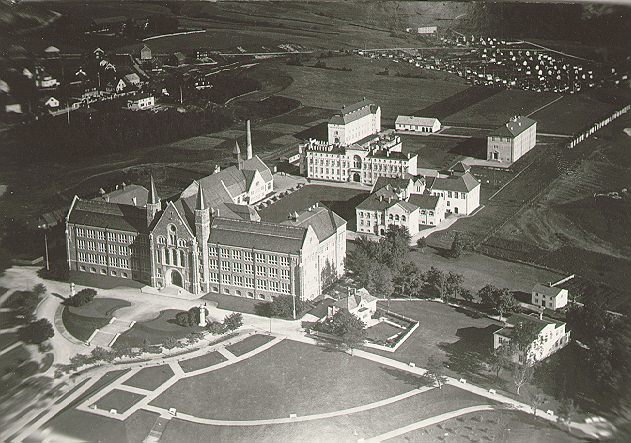
Aerial view of NTH in 1930

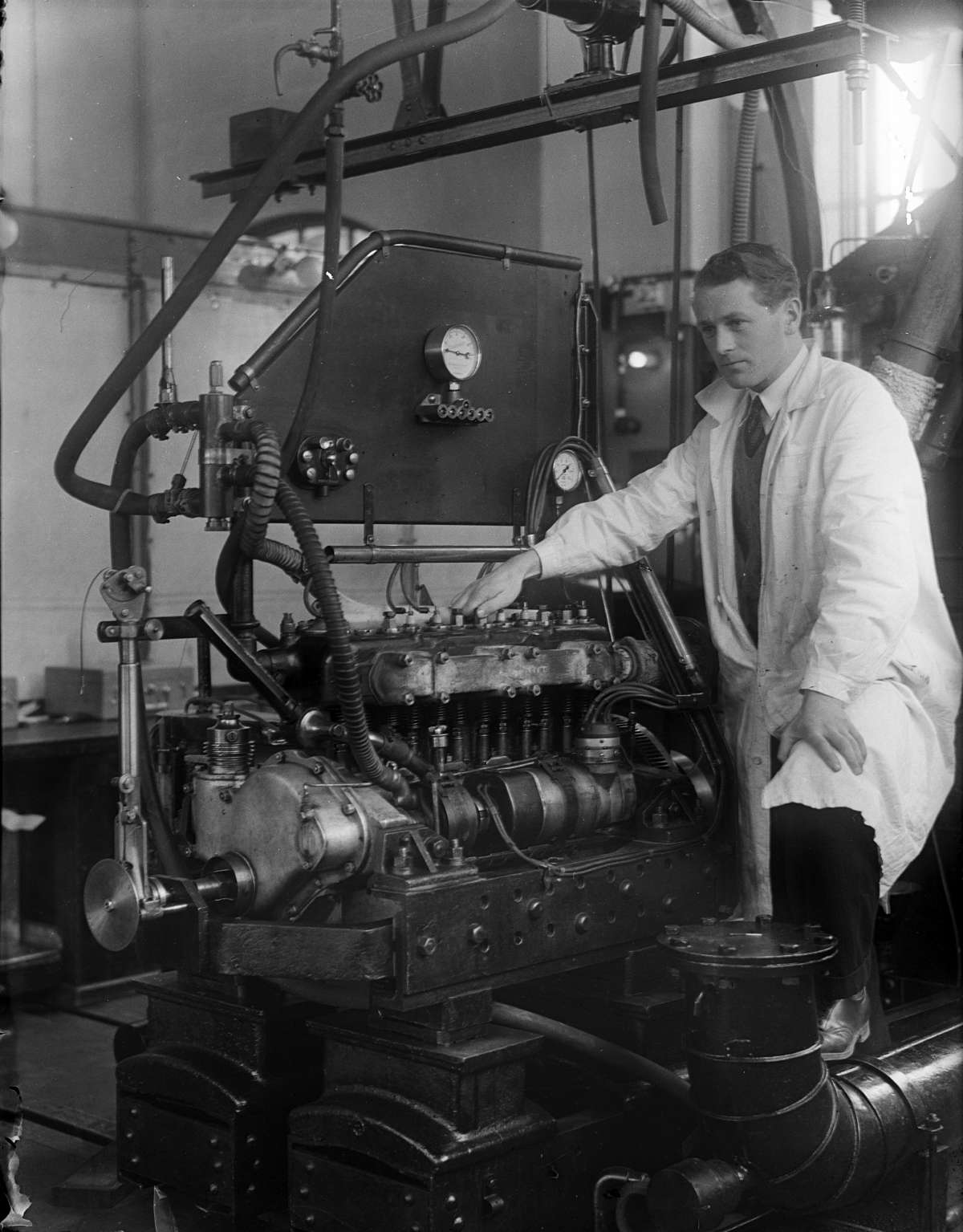
NTH Engineering student in 1933

NTNU is a young institution with a long history. The university, in its current form, was established in 1996 by the merger of six research and higher education institutions in Trondheim, as follows:

- Norwegian Institute of Technology (NTH), established in 1910
- Museum of Natural History and Archaeology (VM), established in 1767
- Norwegian College of General Sciences (AVH), established in 1922
- Faculty of Medicine (DMF), established in 1975
- Trondheim Academy of Fine Art (KiT), established in 1987
- Trondheim Conservatory of Music, established in 1973

Prior to the merger, NTH, NLHT, DMF, and VM together constituted the University of Trondheim, which was a much looser organization. However, the university's root goes back to 1760, with the foundation of Det Trondhiemske Selskab (Trondheim Academy), which in 1767 became the Royal Norwegian Society of Sciences and Letters.

The engineering education in Trondheim began with Trondhjems Tekniske Læreanstalt (Trondheim Technical College) in 1870, and in 1910, Norwegian Institute of Technology (NTH) opened officially. In 2010, NTNU celebrated the 250th anniversary of Trondheim Academy. NTNU also celebrated the 100th anniversary of NTH in the same year. The centennial was also celebrated by the publication of several books, among them a history of the university, entitled "Turbulens og tankekraft. Historien om NTNU" which translates as "Turbulence and mindpower: The history of NTNU".

=== 1700s ===
Det Trondhiemske Selskab (Trondheim Academy), Norway's first academic society, was founded in 1760. In 1767, it changed its name to the Royal Norwegian Society of Science and Letters (DKNVS) upon receiving recognition from the Danish-Norwegian king. DKNVS library – today known as NTNU Gunnerus Library – was founded in 1768, and is Norway's oldest library.

=== 1800s ===
First proposal for a Norwegian Polytechnical Institute was made in 1833. Trondhjems Tekniske Læreanstalt (Trondheim Technical College) or TTL was founded in 1870. The newly formed school educated engineers of various fields. In 1898, TTL moved to a larger building in Munkegata. TTL was disbanded in the 1900s, giving a way to a Norwegian Institute of Technology.

=== 1900–1968 ===
In 1900, the Norwegian Parliament passed a resolution supporting the establishment of Norwegian Institute of Technology (NTH) in Trondheim. NTH was officially opened on 15 September 1910. Five academical departments were originally present in the parliament's resolution of 31 May 1900, such as Architecture and Urban Planning, Civil Engineering, Mechanical Engineering (a. General and b. Naval, i.e. ship and ship engine construction), Electrical engineering, and Chemistry (a. General and b. Electro-chemistry).

In 1922, Norwegian College of Teaching in Trondheim (NLHT) opened at Lade gård.

In 1950, Stiftelsen for industriell og teknisk forskning (Industrial and Technical Research Centre) or SINTEF was founded as part of NTH and as its link to Norwegian industry.

=== 1968–1996 ===
The University of Trondheim (UNiT) was established in 1968, and the Department of Medicine (later the Faculty of Medicine) was established as part of UNiT in 1974. It was designed by the architect Henning Larsen. In 1984, NLHT also absorbed the Norwegian College of General Sciences (AVH) as part of UNiT.

=== 1996–2016 ===
On 1 January 1996, the University of Trondheim became the Norwegian University of Science and Technology (NTNU). As early as 1989, NTH Rector Karsten Jakobsen had broached the idea of a Norwegian University of Science and Technology in Trondheim. On 21 March 1995 the Parliament, with barely a majority after a long debate, decided to establish NTNU in Trondheim. In 2012 the popular trivia game Kahoot was founded in by Johan Brand, Jamie Brooker and Morten Versvik in a joint project with the Norwegian University of Science and Technology. They teamed up with Professor Alf Inge Wang and were later joined by Norwegian entrepreneur Åsmund Furuseth.

=== 2016–present ===
In 2014, the Norwegian Ministry of Education and Research asked the country's universities and university colleges to provide suggestions, observations, and ideas for rebuilding Norway's institutions of higher education. The context of the request was that the Norwegian government wanted to cut back on the number of institutions in the sector.

The NTNU board decided on 28 January 2015 to merge NTNU with the University Colleges of Sør-Trøndelag, Ålesund and Gjøvik to form a new university that would retain the university's current name, the Norwegian University of Science and Technology. The merger, which went into effect in January 2016, made NTNU Norway's largest single university.

== Campus ==
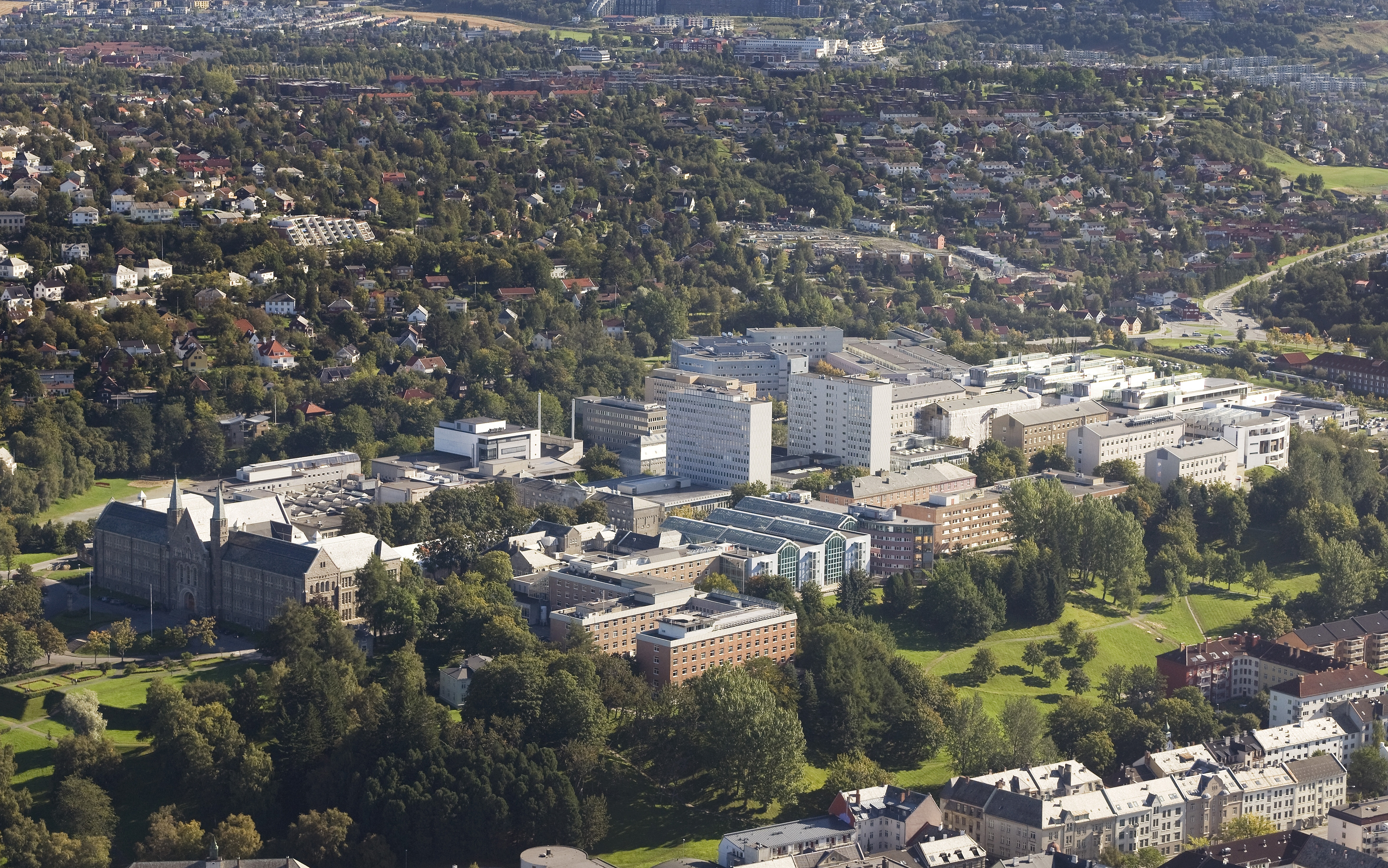
Aerial photograph of Gløshaugen Campus, 2009

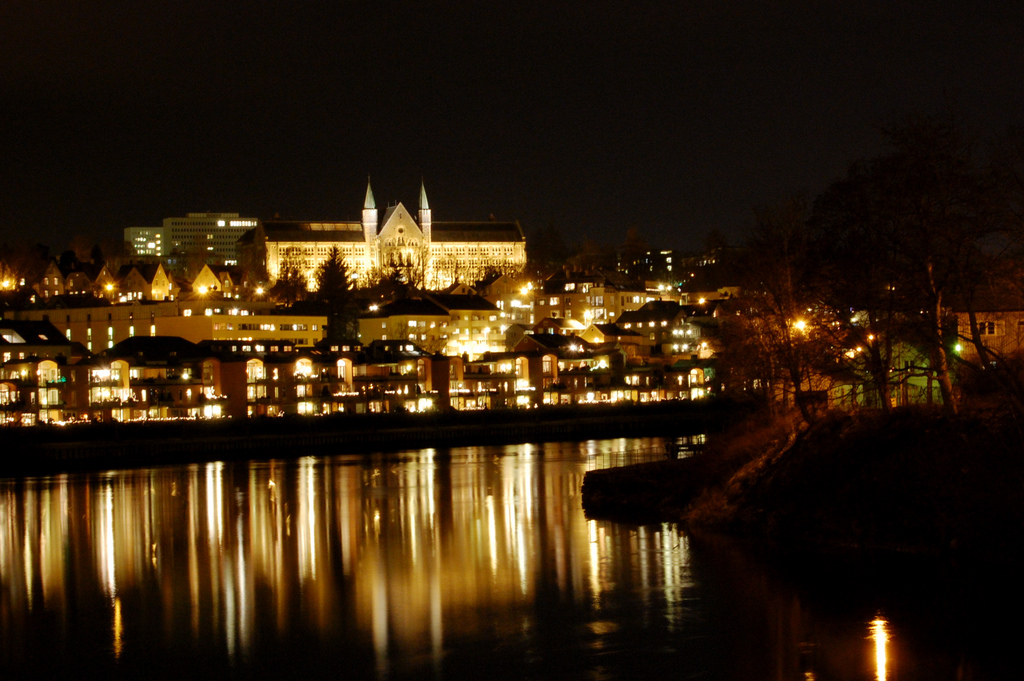
NTNU Main Building (Hovedbygningen), viewed from the Old City Bridge

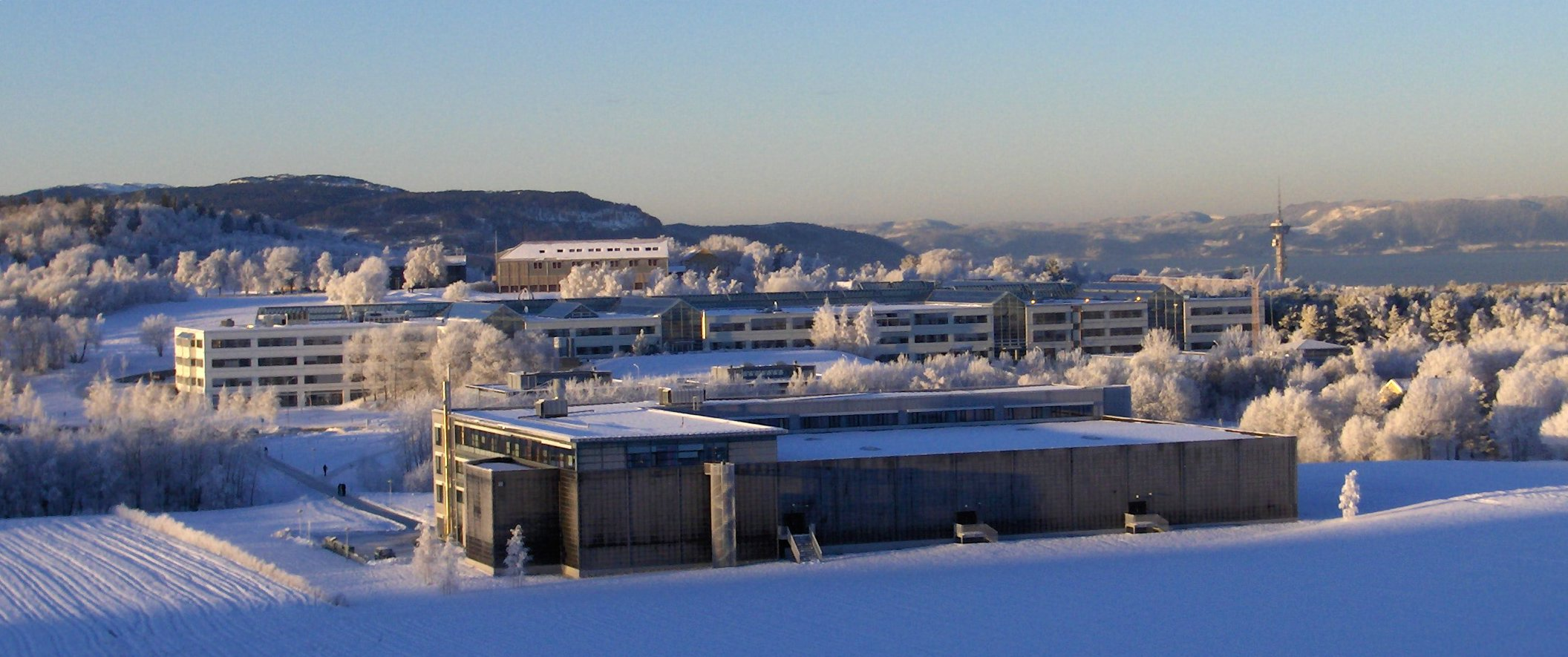
NTNU Dragvoll Campus in winter

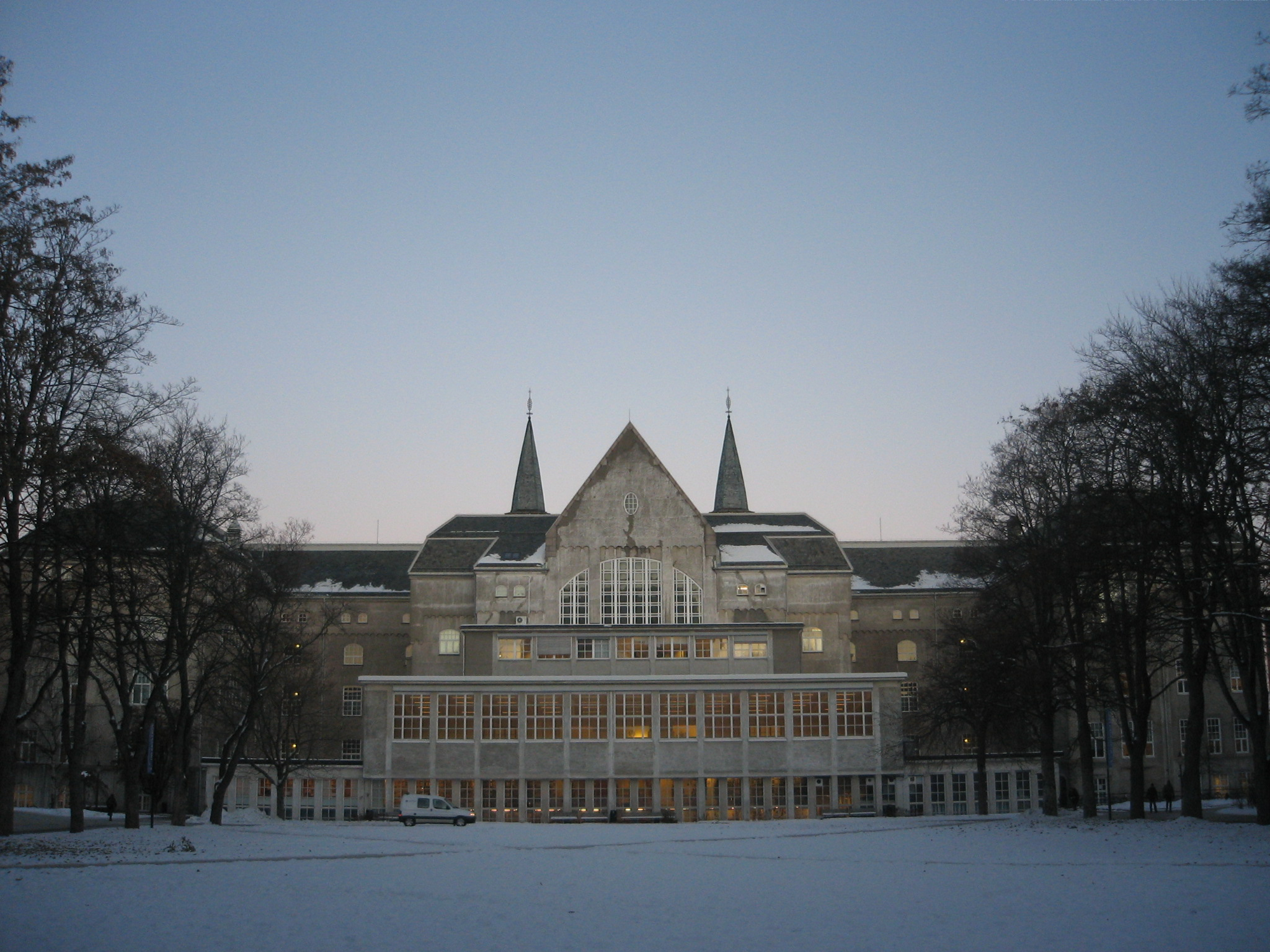
South view of Hovedbygningen at Campus Gløshaugen, Trondheim

NTNU has several campuses in Trondheim; Gløshaugen – for engineering and natural sciences – and Dragvoll – for humanities and social sciences – are the main two campuses. Other campuses include Tyholt for marine technology, Øya for medicine, Kalvskinnet for archaeology, Midtbyen for the music conservatory and Nedre Elvehavn for the art academy. NTNU Gløshaugen is an artistic combination of historical NTH buildings and modern buildings. Combined, the campuses span a total area of 734,000 m^{2}.

In addition to NTNU, the following research institutes are located at Gløshaugen, and cooperate closely with NTNU in several areas of research and development:

SINTEF, since its establishment in 1950, has its main departments at Gløshaugen. SINTEF was originally founded by NTH, but since 1980 has been an independent research institute.

In 1998, the Paper and Fibre Research Institute (PFI), an independent research institute, moved into a new building at Gløshaugen, relocating from Gaustad in Oslo.

In April 2013, the Norwegian Institute for Nature Research (NINA) moved into a new building south of the Natural Science building. NINA often works closely with SINTEF and NTNU.

NTNU has long considered the possibility of bringing the two largest campuses together at or near NTNU's Gløshaugen campus. In 2013, the Rector initiated a vision project and charged it with defining different perspectives on future development in a 50-year perspective. The same year, 2013, the Norwegian Ministry of Education and Research initiated a choice of concept study for the future co-localization of NTNU's two main campuses in Trondheim. The reports were presented in 2014, and both recommended bringing Dragvoll and Gløshaugen together, and better integrating them with the city. A unanimous NTNU board endorsed the recommendations in the vision report.

=== Merger ===
On 1 January 2016, the merger between NTNU and the university colleges in Gjøvik, Ålesund, and Sør-Trøndelag officially entered into force, and NTNU consequently had campuses in Ålesund and Gjøvik, as well as in Trondheim. 2016 was also a transitional year in terms of NTNU's leadership. On 24 November 2015 the new Board met for the first time. It was then extended to include board members from each of the three former university colleges and an external representative appointed by the Ministry of Education.

== Organization ==
NTNU is governed by a board of 11 members, in accordance with the provisions of the Norwegian Act relating to universities and university colleges. Two of the members are elected by and from the students.

NTNU's overall budget in 2023 was 11 billion NOK, most of which came from the Norwegian Ministry of Education.

As a result of the university merger in 2016, the number of NTNU faculties increased from seven to nine – including the University Museum – with approximately 39,000 students and approximately 2,500 PhD students. The eight NTNU faculties are organized in 55 departments:

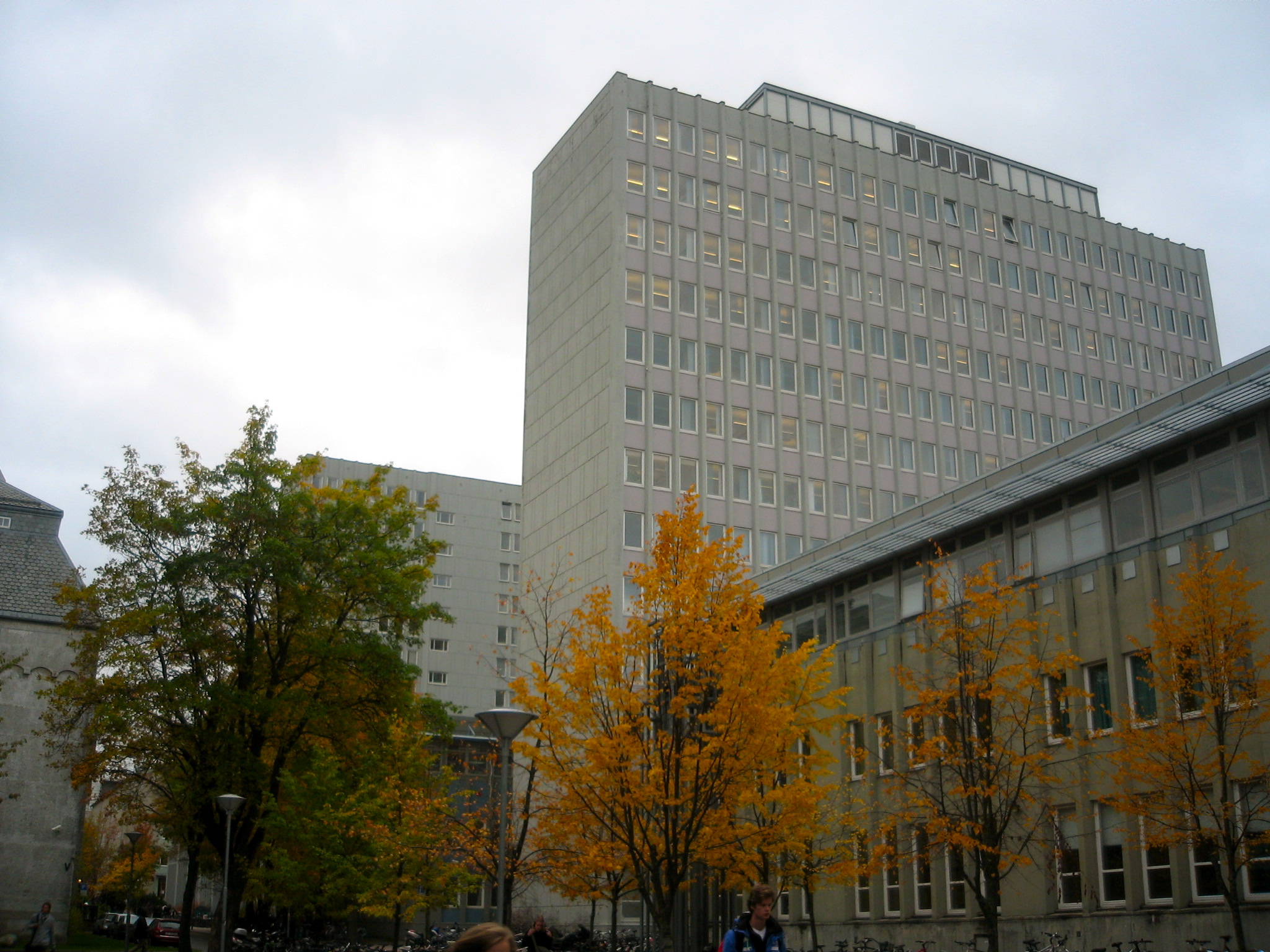
Central building at NTNU Gløshaugen Campus

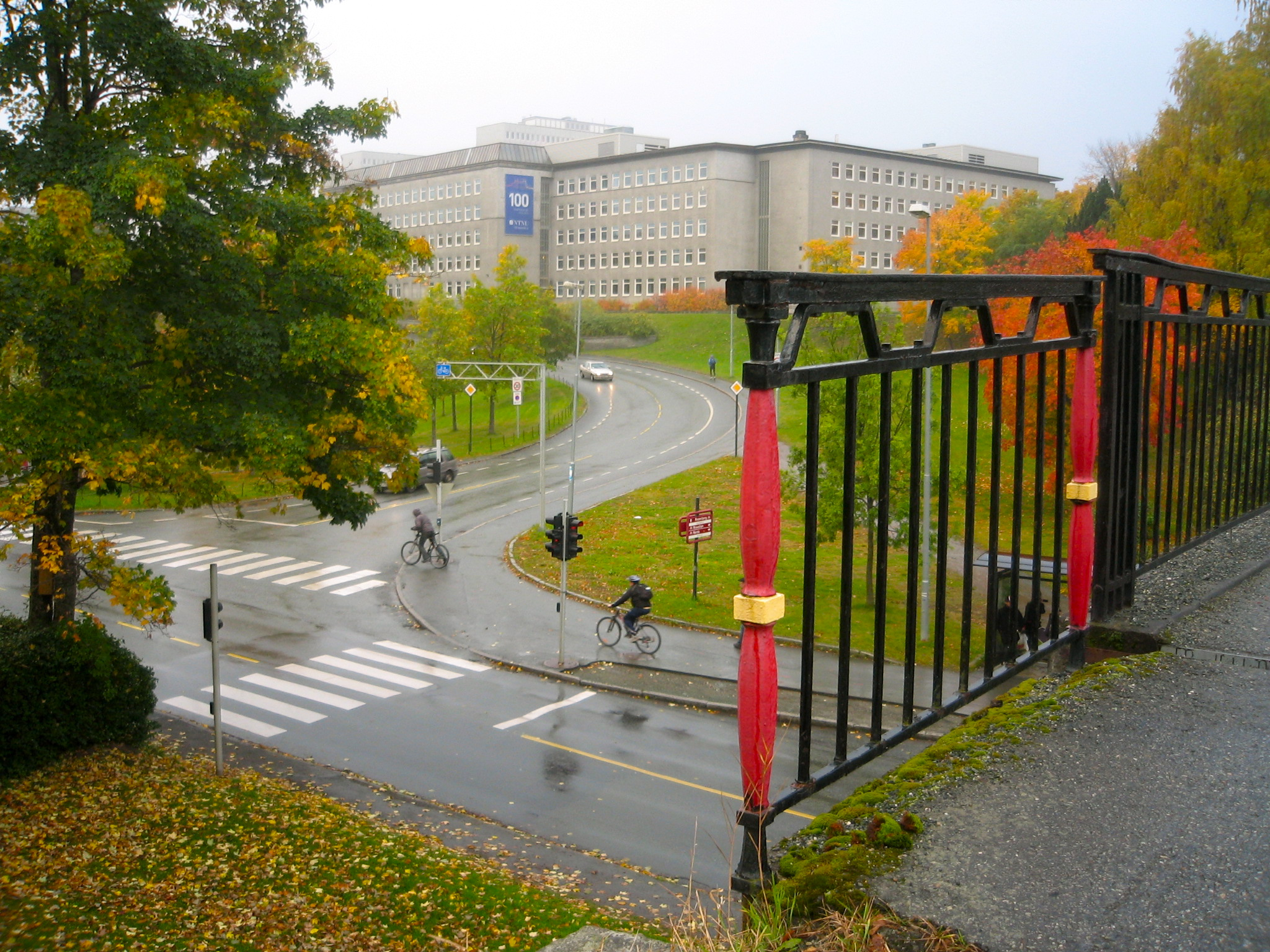
The college bridge (Høyskolebrua) connecting Campus Gløshaugen to Trondheim Bakklandet. The bridge was constructed in 1927, designed by Sverre Pedersen.

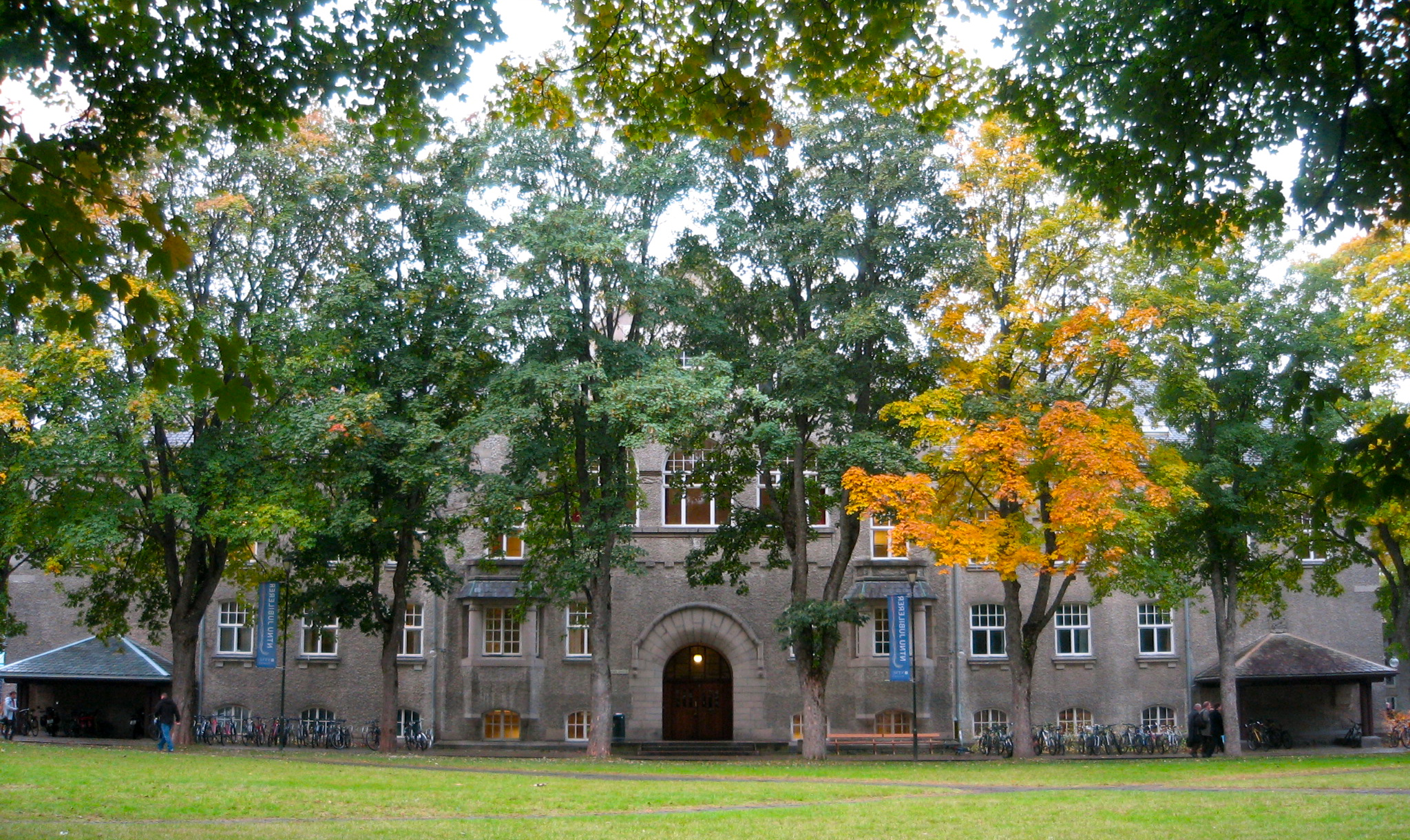
NTNU Old Electrical Engineering Building, one of the first four buildings of NTH, dated to 1910

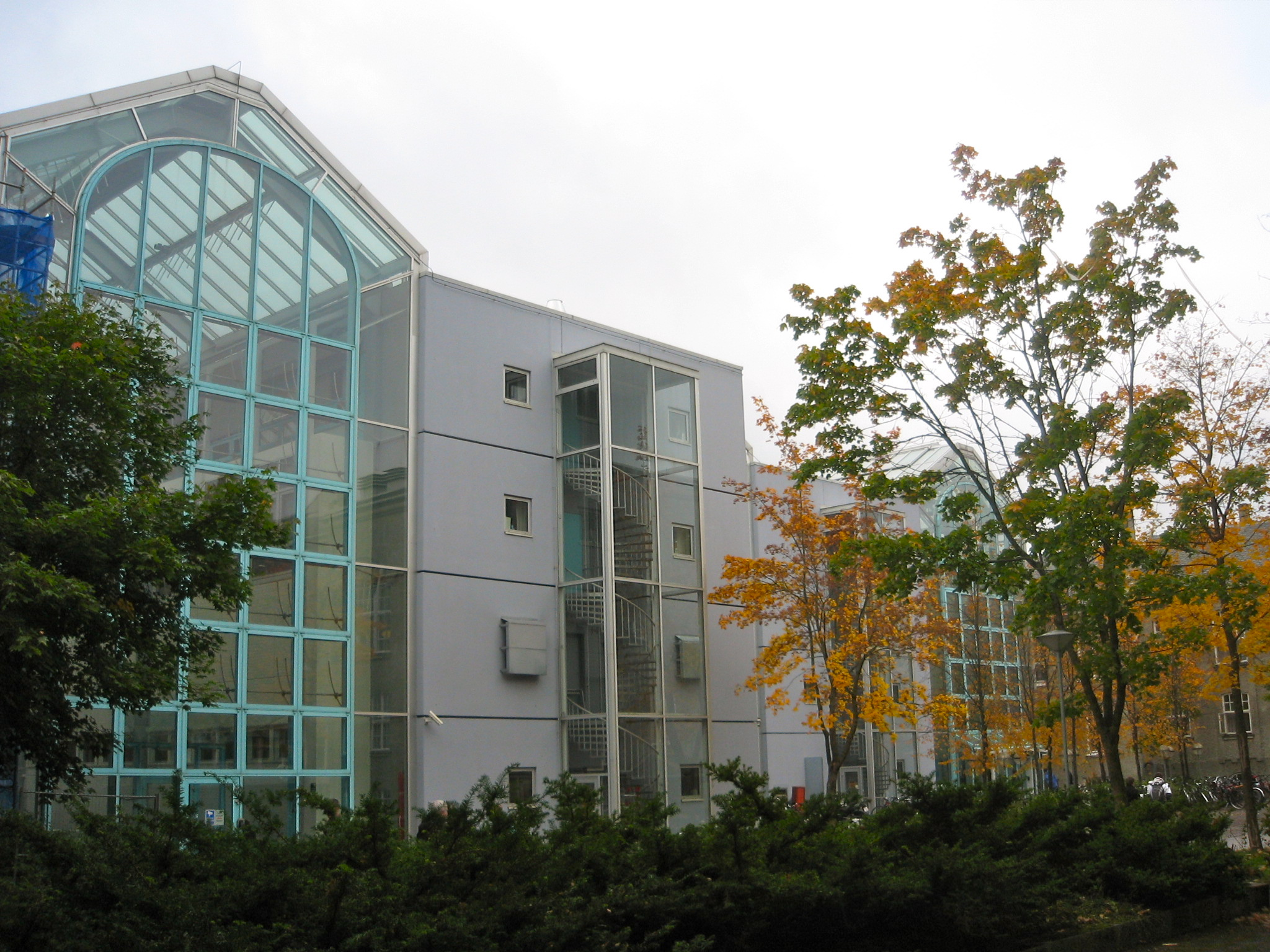
NTNU Electrical Engineering Building, Block F (Laboratories of Electric Power Engineering)

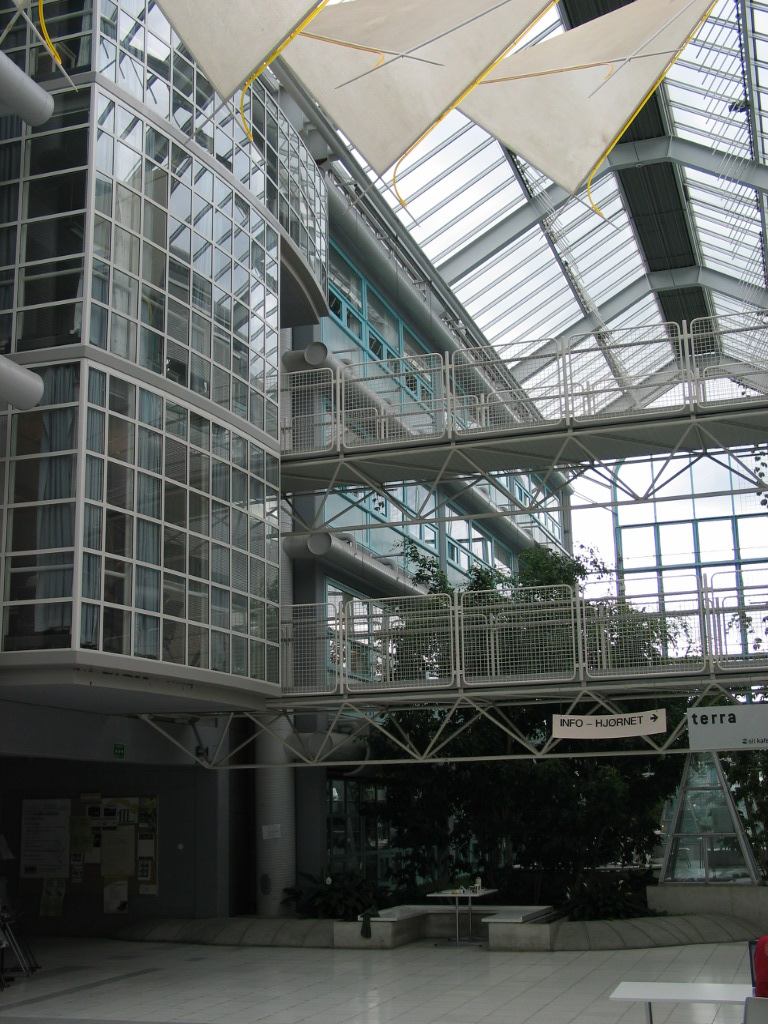
NTNU Electrical Engineering Hall (Block E), known as Glassgården or Royal Electric Garden

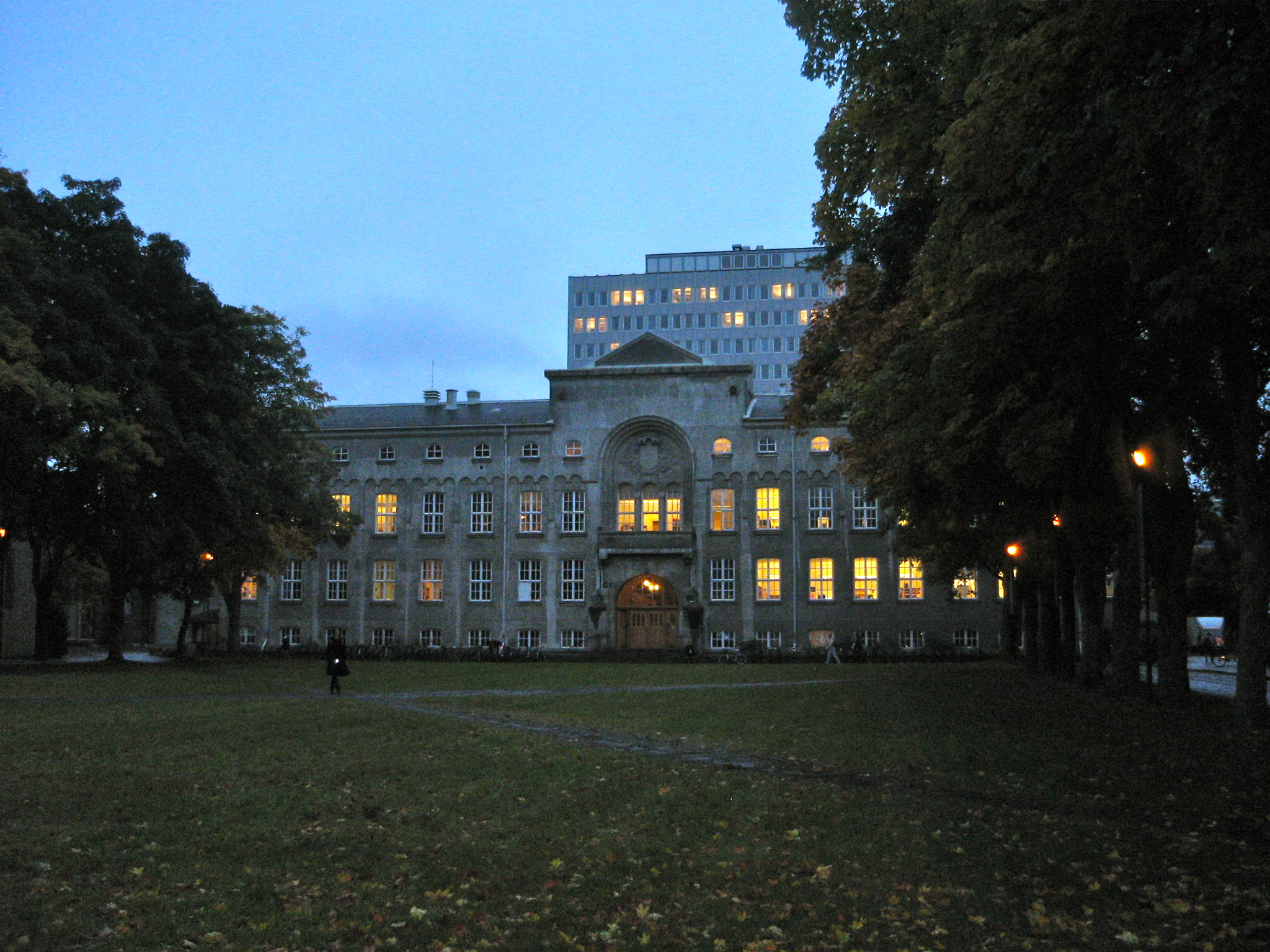
NTNU Old Chemistry Building

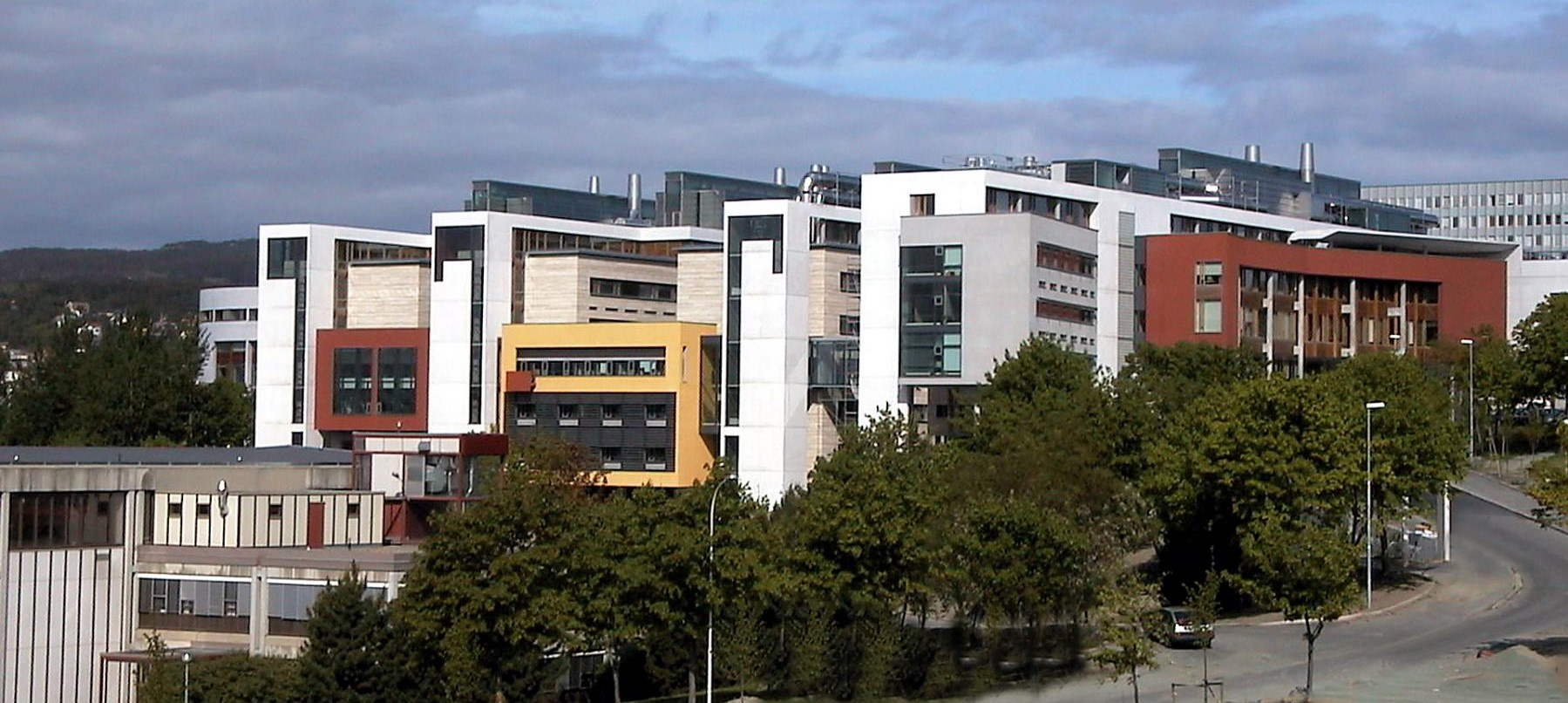
NTNU Natural Science Building (2000), known as Realfagbygget, seen from southern Gløshaugen

=== Faculty of Architecture and Design ===
The Faculty of Architecture and Design has four departments:

- Department of Architecture and Planning
- Department of Architecture and Technology
- Department of Design
- Trondheim Academy of Fine Art

=== Faculty of Humanities ===
The Faculty of Humanities has seven departments:

- Department of Art and Media Studies
- Department of Historical and Classical Studies
- Department of Interdisciplinary Studies of Culture
- Department of Language and Literature
- Department of Modern History and Society
- Department of Music
- Department of Philosophy and Religious Studies

=== Faculty of Information Technology and Electrical Engineering ===
The Faculty of Information Technology and Electrical Engineering has seven departments:

- Department of Computer Science
- Department of Electric Energy
- Department of Electronic Systems
- Department of Engineering Cybernetics
- Department of ICT and Natural Sciences (in Ålesund)
- Department of Information Security and Communication Technology
- Department of Mathematical Sciences

=== Faculty of Engineering ===
The Faculty of Engineering has eight departments:

- Department of Civil and Environmental Engineering
- Department of Energy and Process Engineering
- Department of Geoscience and Petroleum
- Department of Manufacturing and Civil Engineering (in Gjøvik)
- Department of Marine Technology
- Department of Mechanical and Industrial Engineering
- Department of Ocean Operations and Civil Engineering (in Ålesund)
- Department of Structural Engineering

=== Faculty of Medicine and Health Sciences ===
The Faculty is integrated with St. Olavs Hospital, Trondheim University Hospital, and is located in Campus Øya in Trondheim. Its main areas of research are translational research, medical technology and health surveys, biobanks and registers. In 2016 the faculty had about 350 master's degree students, 250 bachelor's degree students, 720 medical students and more than 500 students attending other courses.

The Faculty of Medicine and Health Sciences has eight departments:

- Department of Circulation and Medical Imaging
- Department of Clinical and Molecular Medicine
- Department of Health Sciences in Gjøvik
- Department of Health Sciences in Ålesund
- Department of Mental Health
- Department of Neuromedicine and Movement Science
- Department of Public Health and Nursing
- Kavli Institute for Systems Neuroscience

=== Faculty of Natural Sciences ===
The Faculty of Natural Sciences has eight departments:

- Department of Biological Sciences Ålesund
- Department of Biology
- Department of Biomedical Laboratory Science
- Department of Biotechnology and Food Science
- Department of Chemical Engineering
- Department of Chemistry
- Department of Materials Science and Engineering
- Department of Physics

=== Faculty of Social and Educational Sciences ===
The Faculty of Social and Educational Sciences has seven departments:

- Department of Education and Lifelong Learning
- Department of Geography
- Department of Psychology
- Department of Social Anthropology
- Department of Social Work
- Department of Sociology and Political Science
- Department of Teacher Education

=== Faculty of Economics and Management ===
The Faculty of Economics and Management has four departments:

- Department of Economics
- Department of Industrial Economics and Technology Management
- Department of International Business
- NTNU Business School

=== NTNU University Museum ===
The NTNU University Museum forms part of the university at the same organizational level as the faculties. It has two departments:

- Department of Archaeology and Cultural History
- Department of Natural History

== Research ==
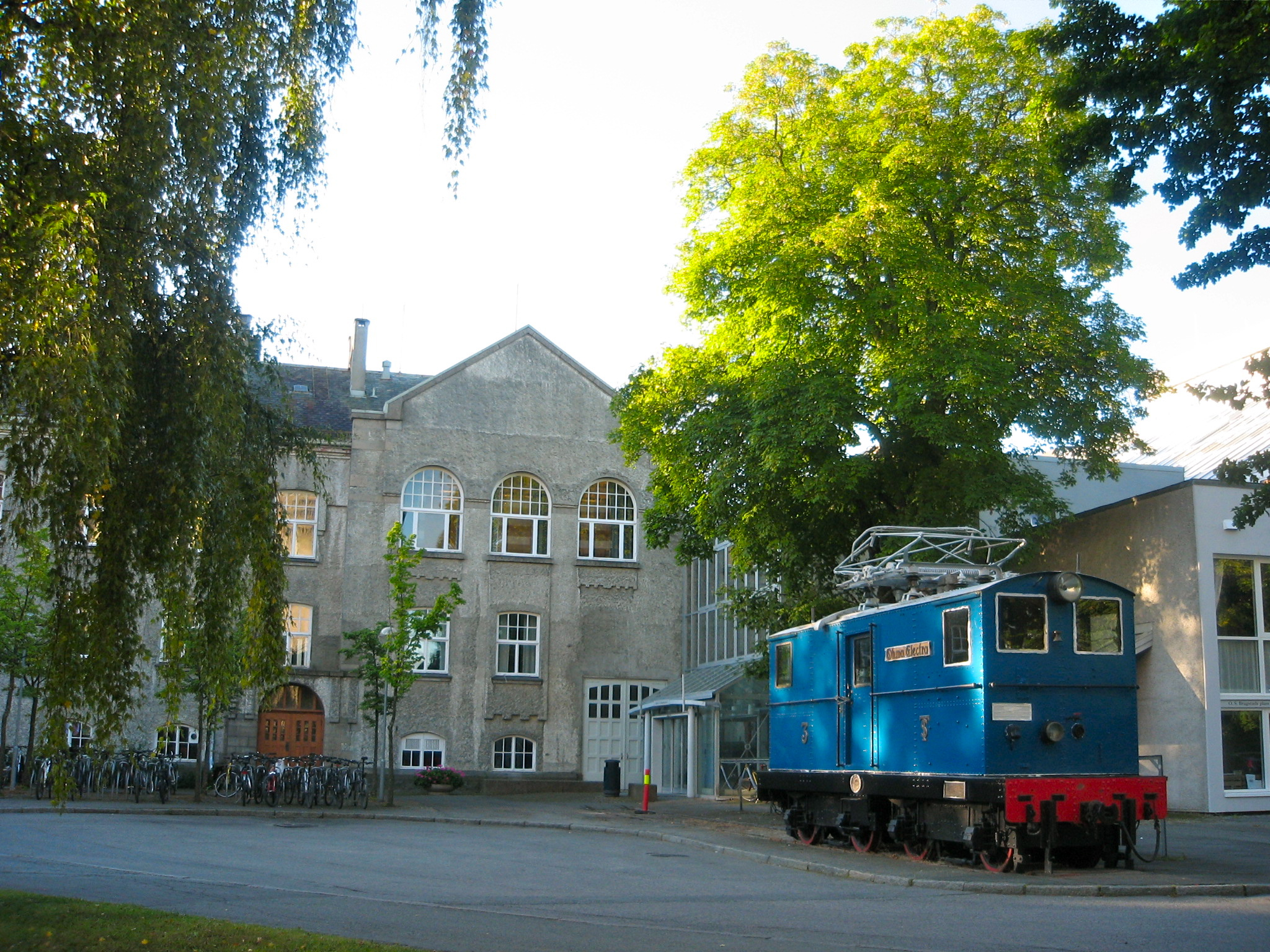
Ohma Electra was one of the first AC powered locomotives in the world (in operation from 1908 to 1950). It is now placed in front of the Old Electrical Engineering building.

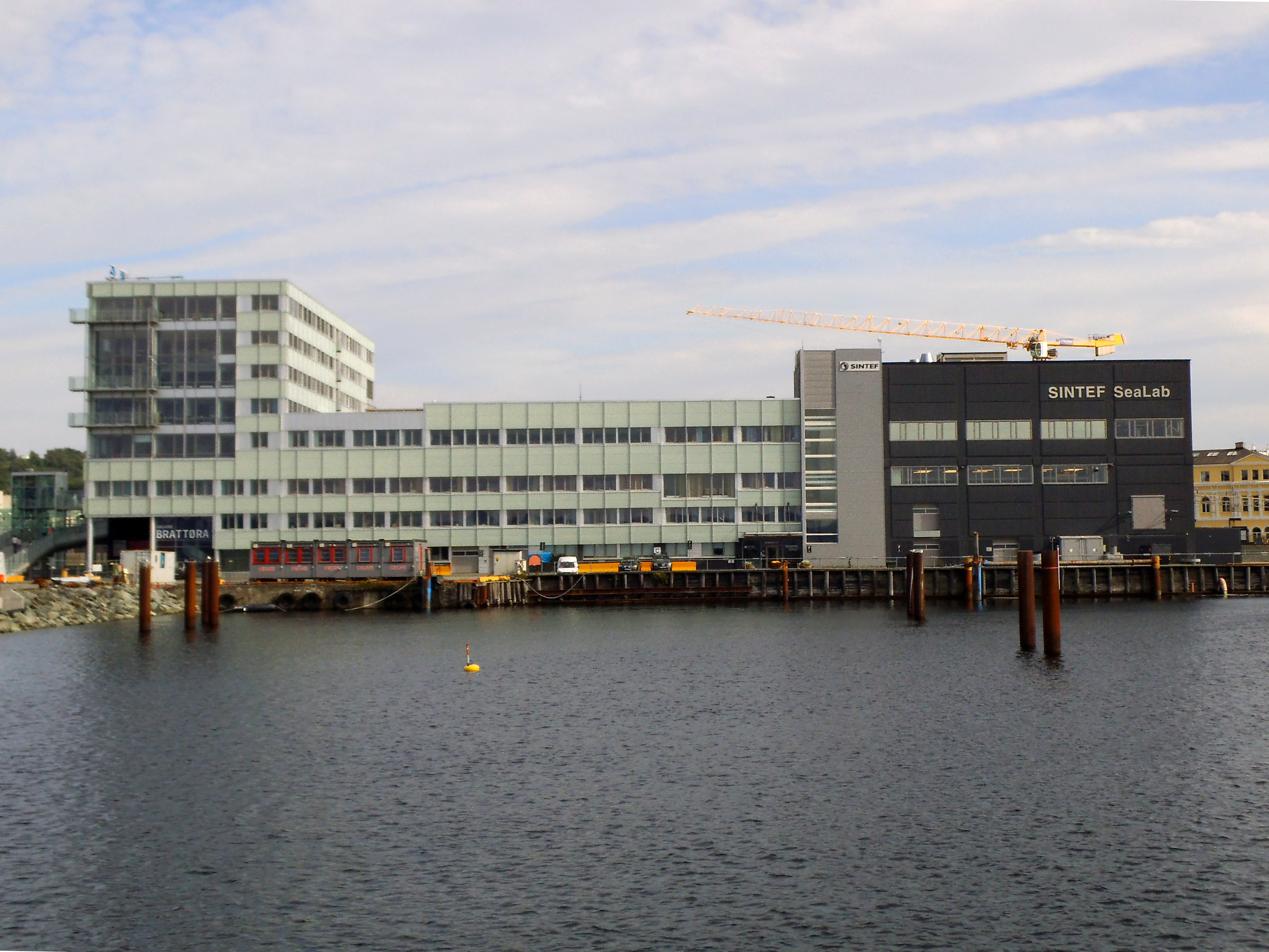
Sintef SeaLab

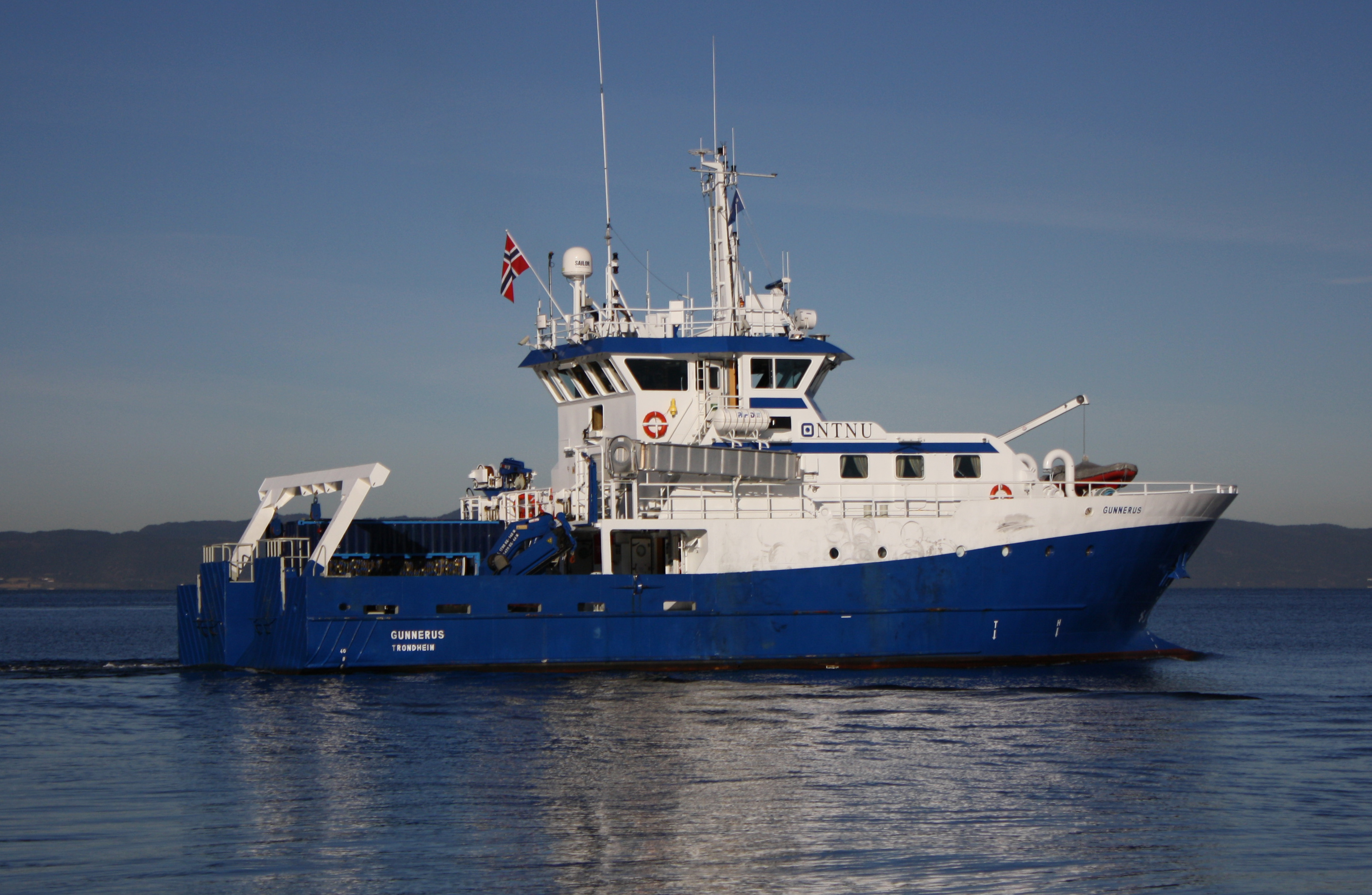
NTNU research vessel Gunnerus

NTNU's history of research in engineering goes back to the early 20th century, when Norway's first electric railway, known as Thamshavn Line, was developed and constructed in Trondheim as an AC-powered tramway, with Trondheim-based technologies. The tramway was launched in 1908 and remained in operation until 1974.

Now, research is part of the ongoing activities at NTNU faculties as well as the University Museum. The university has 4377 scientific staff who conduct research in more than 120 laboratories, and are at any time running more than 2,000 research projects. Students and staff can take advantage of roughly 300 research agreements or exchange programs with 58 institutions worldwide.

NTNU has identified four Strategic Research Areas for 2014–2023: NTNU Energy, NTNU Health, NTNU Oceans and NTNU Sustainability, which were chosen on the basis of social relevance, professional quality and the potential for interdisciplinary cooperation.

=== Research centres ===
The university hosts six National Centres of Excellence (SFF), 12 Centres for Research-based Innovation (SFI), and three Centres for Environment-friendly Energy Research (FME), which are mainly funded by The Research Council of Norway. NTNU is also a partner in several centres with SINTEF.

The Trøndelag Health Study, with the HUNT Research Centre and HUNT Biobank located in Levanger, is organized under the Faculty of Medicine and Health Sciences.

=== Research vessel ===
The NTNU operates a research vessel, 'Gunnerus' named after Johan Ernst Gunnerus. It has been in operation since 2006 and can serve as a platform for ROVs. The vessel is 31.25m length and was retrofitted/upgraded in 2017/2018.

=== Kavli Institute for Systems Neuroscience ===
The fifteenth Kavli Institute was inaugurated at NTNU in 2007, as the Kavli Institute for Systems Neuroscience, which was the fourth Kavli Institute in neuroscience in the world and the first Kavli Institute in Northern Europe. In 2012, Prime Minister Jens Stoltenberg opened the Norwegian Brain Centre as an outgrowth of NTNU's Kavli Institute. It is one of the largest research laboratories of its kind in the world.

=== Enabling technologies ===
NTNU has funded the fundamental long-term research and infrastructure through three Enabling Technologies such as NTNU Biotechnology, NTNU Digital and Nano@NTNU.

=== Research excellence ===
NTNU Research Excellence is an initiative to develop elite researchers and research groups in international class, which was launched in 2013, and includes established and new initiatives. The established initiatives are financed by the Research Council of Norway, the EU, and private-sectors (R&D), while the new initiatives are funded by NTNU's own funds in light of strategic prioritization of NTNU's resources. These cover a number of research funding schemes including Outstanding Academic Fellows Programme, Onsager Fellowship Programme, K.G. Jebsen Centres, EU projects, and ERC grants. NTNU participates in about 218 projects in the EU Horizon 2020 Framework Program.

=== NTNU-SINTEF partnership ===
NTNU works closely with SINTEF, Scandinavia's largest independent research institute and one of the largest contract research organizations in Europe, which is integrated into NTNU Campuses. The cooperation of NTNU and SINTEF has been further developed through the project "Better Together", which was launched in 2014. The research collaboration includes a number of joint research laboratories, for example:

- Gemini Centres: NTNU and SINTEF have established a wide range of Gemini Centres. Scientific groups with parallel interests coordinate their scientific efforts and jointly operate their resources.
- MARINTEK: It has been working in the area of the developing of cost-effective and high-performance ships with the usage of model testing in the laboratories. It provides testing facilities, expertise, and analytical tools for developing ship concepts. MARINTEK is located at the NTNU Department of Marine Technology, and has recently joined SINTEF Ocean.
- Rolls-Royce University Technology Centre: Rolls-Royce Marine, MARINTEK, and NTNU has been working on the development of propellers, propulsion systems, ship designs, and various ship equipment. The Rolls-Royce University Technology Centre is focused on propellers and propulsion in waves and off-design conditions.
- NTNU NanoLab: It works in the area of providing collaborative research environment for scientists within the fields of physics, chemistry, biology, electrical engineering, materials technology and medical research. The research activities are carried out in collaboration with SINTEF.
- SINTEF Energy Lab: Its energy laboratories provide important tools for development of energy solutions and power systems. It has a wide range of experimental facilities in different areas of Electric Power Engineering from High Voltage Technology to Power Electronics. The research activities are application-based and are carried out in close collaboration with NTNU.
- The Gas Technology Centre: It works in the area of multidisciplinary research and the natural gas value chain. The centre is the largest natural gas research- and educational centre in Norway, located at NTNU.
- Norwegian Fuel Cell Hydrogen Centre, a joint initiative taken by SINTEF, NTNU and Institute for Energy Technology (IFE).

== International relations ==
NTNU is an active member of the University of the Arctic. UArctic is an international cooperative network based in the Circumpolar Arctic region, consisting of more than 200 universities, colleges, and other organizations with an interest in promoting education and research in the Arctic region.

The university also participates in UArctic's mobility program north2north. The aim of that program is to enable students of member institutions to study in different parts of the North.

== Publishing ==
To increase Open Access publishing, NTNU has established a publishing fund.

In 2008 NTNU's digital institutional repository was founded. The intention was to establish a full-text archive for the documentation of the scientific output of the institution and to make as much as possible of the material available online, both nationally and internationally.

In addition to the research articles and books, intended for academics and researchers both inside and outside the university, NTNU disseminates news to the public about the institution and its research and results.

Universitetsavisa, which translates to The University Newspaper, is the news and discussion paper of the university, available only in Norwegian. It was established in 1991. For a period it existed in both printed and digital editions, but since 2002 it is only available online.

GEMINI publishes research news from NTNU and the independent research group SINTEF in both English and Norwegian. It is published in both a printed and a digital version.

The Norwegian University of Science and Technology publishes the Nordic Journal of Science and Technology.

== Ranking ==
University rankings

Global – Overall
- ARWU World: 151–200 (2025)
- QS World: 267 (2026)
- THE World: 301–350 (2026)
- USNWR Global: =267 (2025)

According to Times Higher Education World University Rankings published in March 2017, NTNU is ranked first in the world ranking of universities with the biggest corporate links, due to its research collaboration with SINTEF. Statistically, 9.1 percent of NTNU's total research output is generated in collaboration with SINTEF, which is the largest academic-industry partnership in the world.

NTNU was ranked 182nd in the world 2 June 2025 in the CWUR World University Rankings, which is based on education, employability, faculty, and research.

NTNU was ranked 191st in the world 3 July 2024 in the CWTS Leiden Ranking, which is based on bibliometric indicators.

NTNU was ranked 64th in Europe and 202nd in the world 31 July 2023 in the Webometrics Ranking of World Universities for its presence on the web.

Rankings by ARWU Global Ranking of Academic Subjects 2025:

- Engineering – Marine/Ocean Engineering: 3
- Engineering – Civil Engineering: 28
- Life Sciences – Biological Sciences: 30
- Engineering – Automation & Control: 51–75

== Studies ==
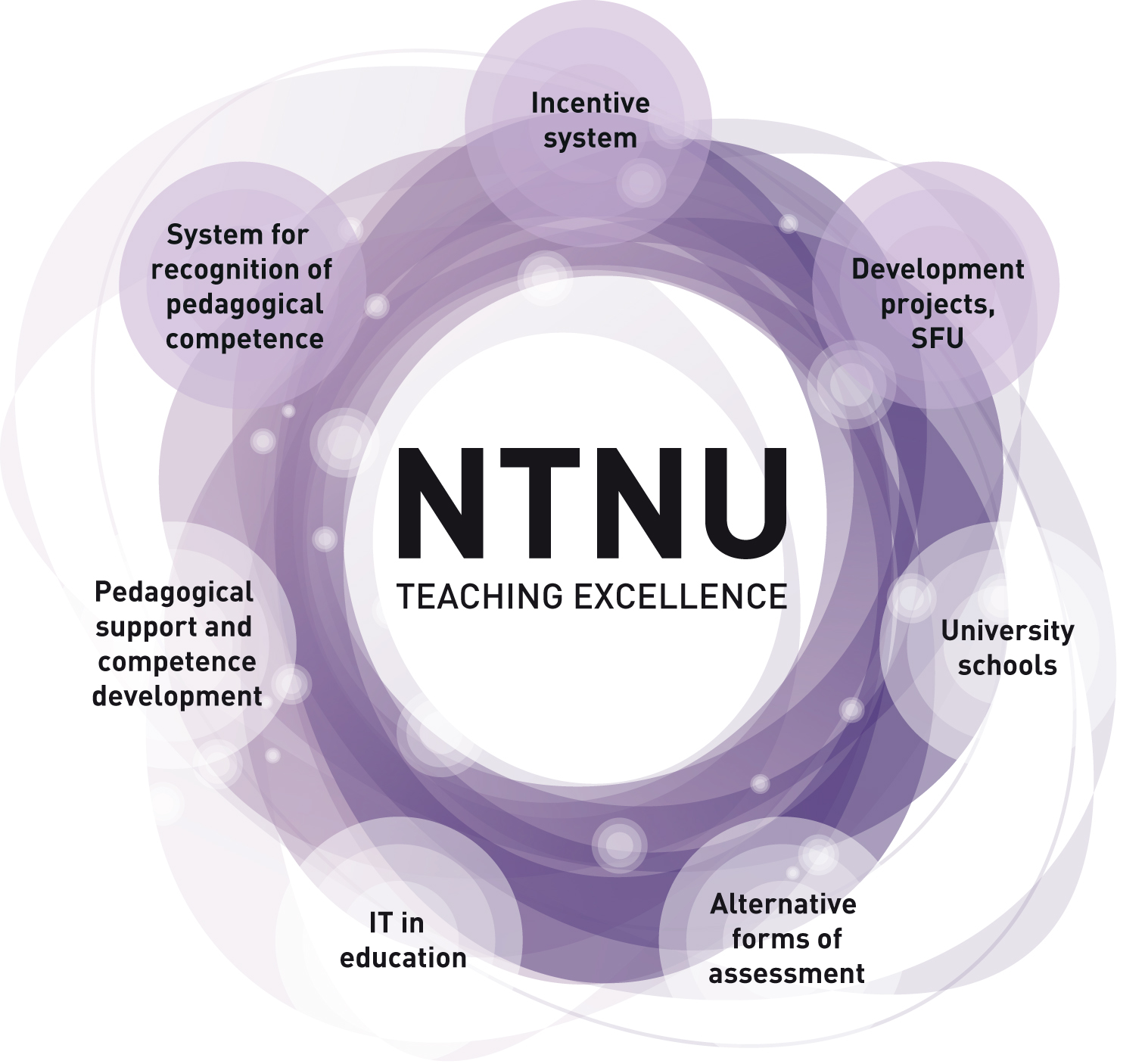
Graph showing the various priority areas included in "NTNU Teaching Excellence"

NTNU specializes in technology and the natural sciences, but also offers a range of bachelor's, master's and doctoral programmes in the humanities, social sciences, economics and public and business administration, and aesthetic disciplines. The university also offers professional degree programmes in medicine, psychology, architecture, the fine arts, music, and teacher education, in addition to technology.

According to the Norwegian Social Science Data Services, NTNU had 84,797 applicants in 2011 and a total student population of 19,054, of whom 9,062 were women. There were 6,193 students enrolled in the Faculty of Social Sciences and Technology Management, 3,518 students enrolled in the Faculty of Engineering Science and Technology, 3,256 students enrolled in the Faculty of Humanities, 3,090 students enrolled in the Faculty of Information Technology, Mathematics and Electrical Engineering, 2,014 students enrolled in the Faculty of Natural Sciences and Technology, 1,071 enrolled in the Faculty of Medicine, and 605 enrolled in the Faculty of Architecture and Fine Art.

About 3500 bachelor's and master's degrees are awarded each year, and more than 5,500 participate in further education programmes.

NTNU has more than 300 cooperative or exchange agreements with 60 universities worldwide, and several international student exchange programmes. There are 3,815 foreign students at the university as of 2025.

=== NTNU Teaching Excellence ===
In 2015, NTNU established an initiative called "NTNU Teaching Excellence".

== Student life ==
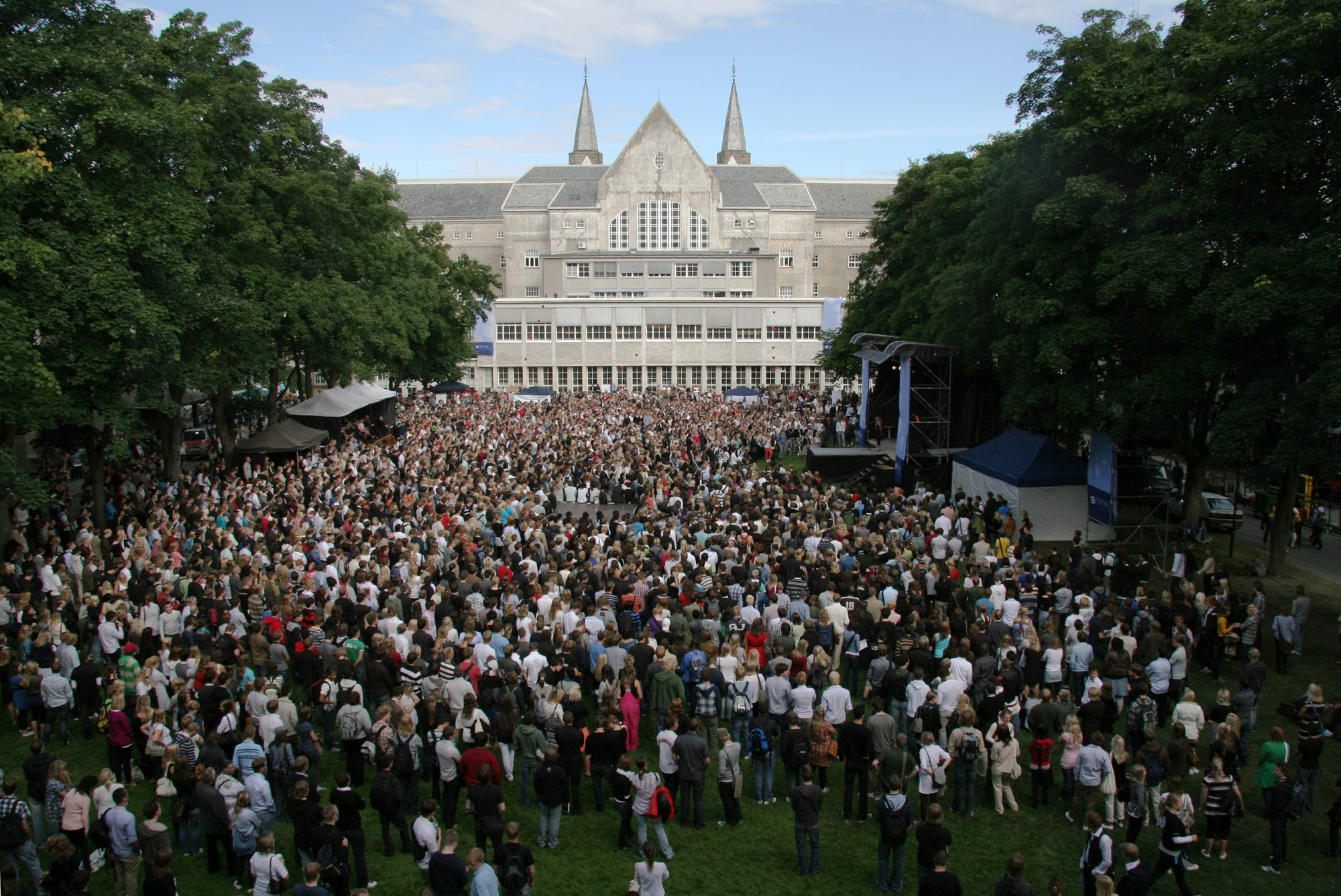
Matriculation day at Campus NTNU Gløshaugen, 2008

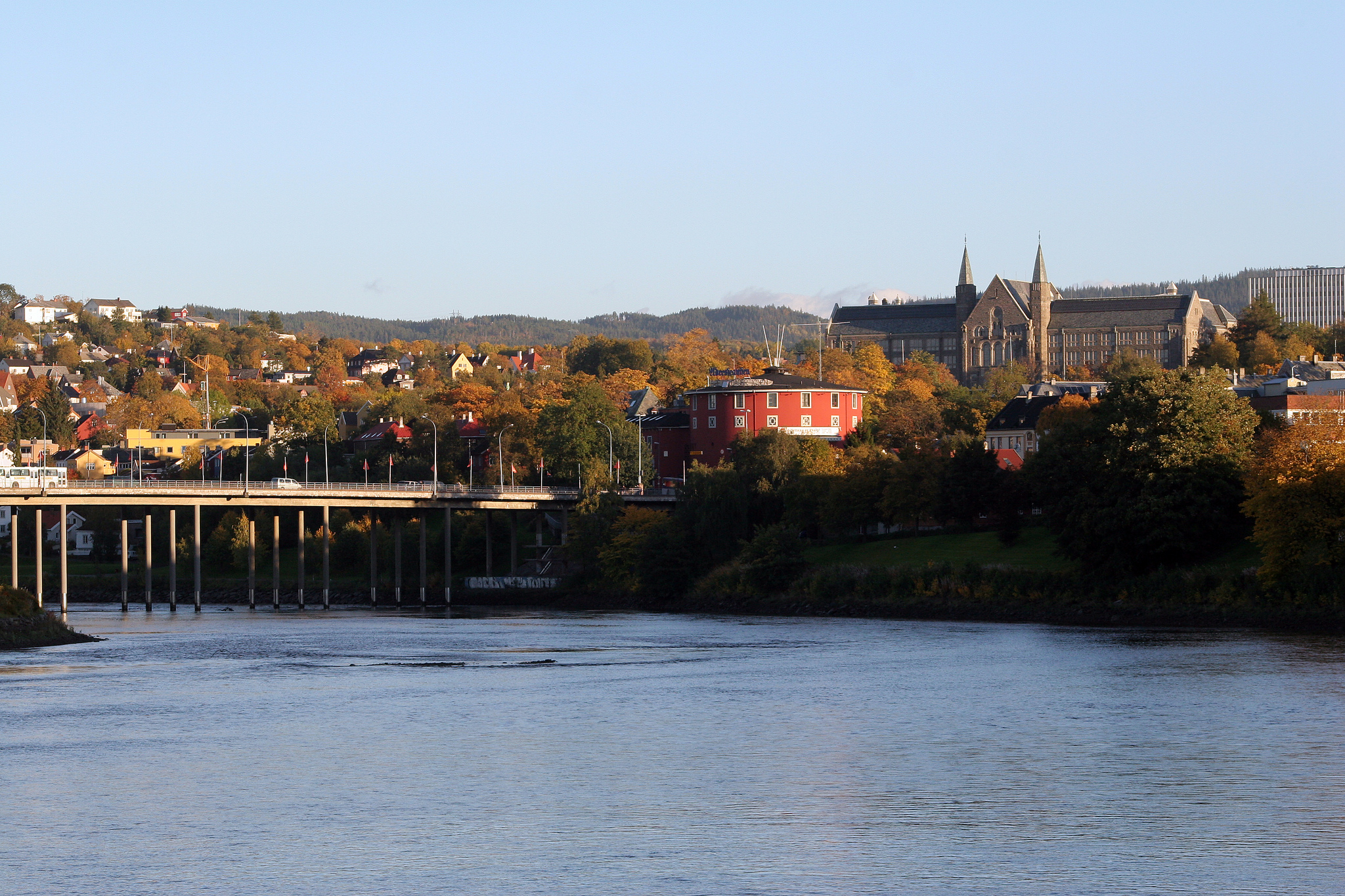
The Students' Society Building, known as Studentersamfundet (the red building) at Campus Gløshaugen

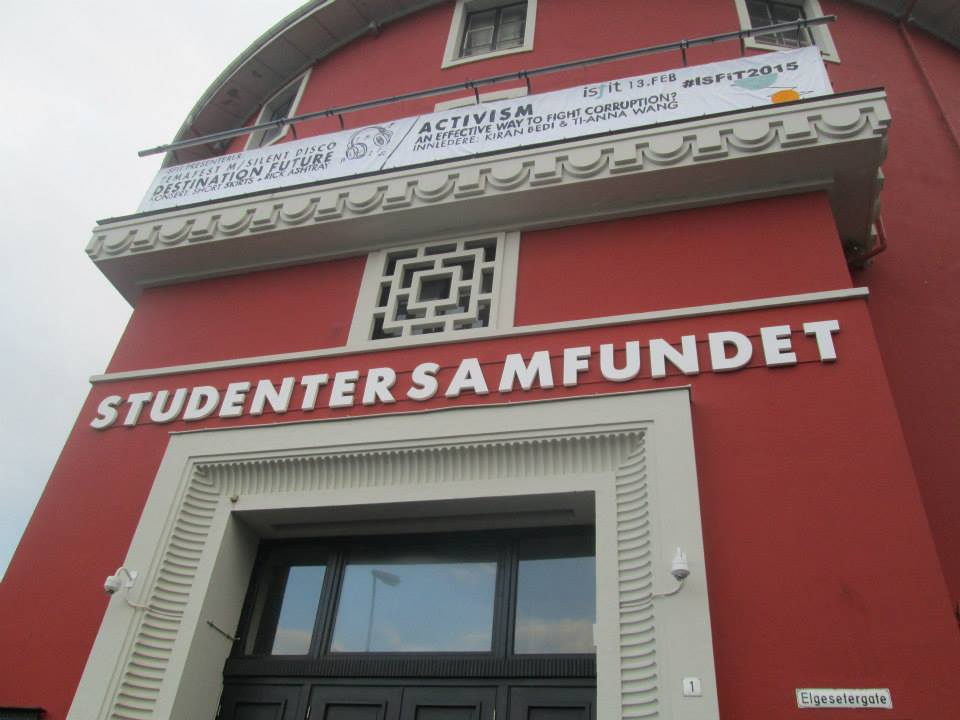
A closeup of the Students' Society, Studentersamfundet

NTNU welcomes students from all over the world, and offers more than 60 international master programmes as well as PhD programmes, which all are taught in English. PhD vacancies are announced on the university website and are paid as academic staff, that offers one of the largest in Europe salaries for its PhD candidates following the Norwegian law regulations. There are no tuition fees at NTNU for Norwegian students and students from European Union, however students do pay "semesteravgift" every semester. In addition to semester fees, the international students have to guarantee their living expenses if they are not offered a scholarship.

NTNU students have a clear presence in the city of Trondheim. The most famous student organization is the Studentersamfundet i Trondhjem, also known as "the red round house" after its architectural form; every other year it organizes a cultural festival UKA. Another festival organized by students is the International Student Festival in Trondheim ISFiT, which awards a student peace prize and draws internationally known speakers. EMECS-thon is a student driven embedded systems marathon competition, organized by students from NTNU and implemented in some of the top universities worldwide, where participants have 48 hours to develop an embedded project from scratch. The student sports organization, NTNUI, has roughly 10,000 members in its many branches, with the largest groups including orienteering, cross-country and telemark skiing, but there are also groups for sports less common in Norway, like American football, lacrosse and aikido. A cabin and cottage organization owns several cabins in the countryside, available for students wishing to spend a few days away. There are also student fraternities, some of which conduct voluntary hazing rituals, which provide contact with potential employers and for social interaction between students. There are also alumni associations; religious and political organizations; clubs devoted to various topics such as innovation, human rights, beer, oatmeal, anime and computers; and The Association for Various Associations, which is a parody of the university's large number of student organizations. University recently started to offer "roof over your head" guarantee to the new coming student to Trondheim until they find proper housing.

NTNU is a pioneer with of the concept of "Student Cabins", the NTNUI offers its students access to cabins on the outskirts of the city of Trondheim in which they can enjoy on vacations and weekends. In 2024 the number of cabins is 23 cabins that can be rented.

== Nobel laureates and notable people ==
=== Nobel laureates ===
- 1968 Lars Onsager, Chemistry (graduated as a chemical engineer from Norwegian Institute of Technology, NTH, in 1925),
- 1973 Ivar Giaever, Physics (graduated as a mechanical engineer from Norwegian Institute of Technology, NTH, in 1952)
- 2014 Edvard Moser, Medicine or Physiology (professor of neuroscience, NTNU), not NTNU alumnus
- 2014 May-Britt Moser, Medicine or Physiology (professor of neuroscience, NTNU), not NTNU alumna
- 2014 John O'Keefe, Medicine or Physiology (visiting researcher, NTNU 2015– ), not NTNU alumnus

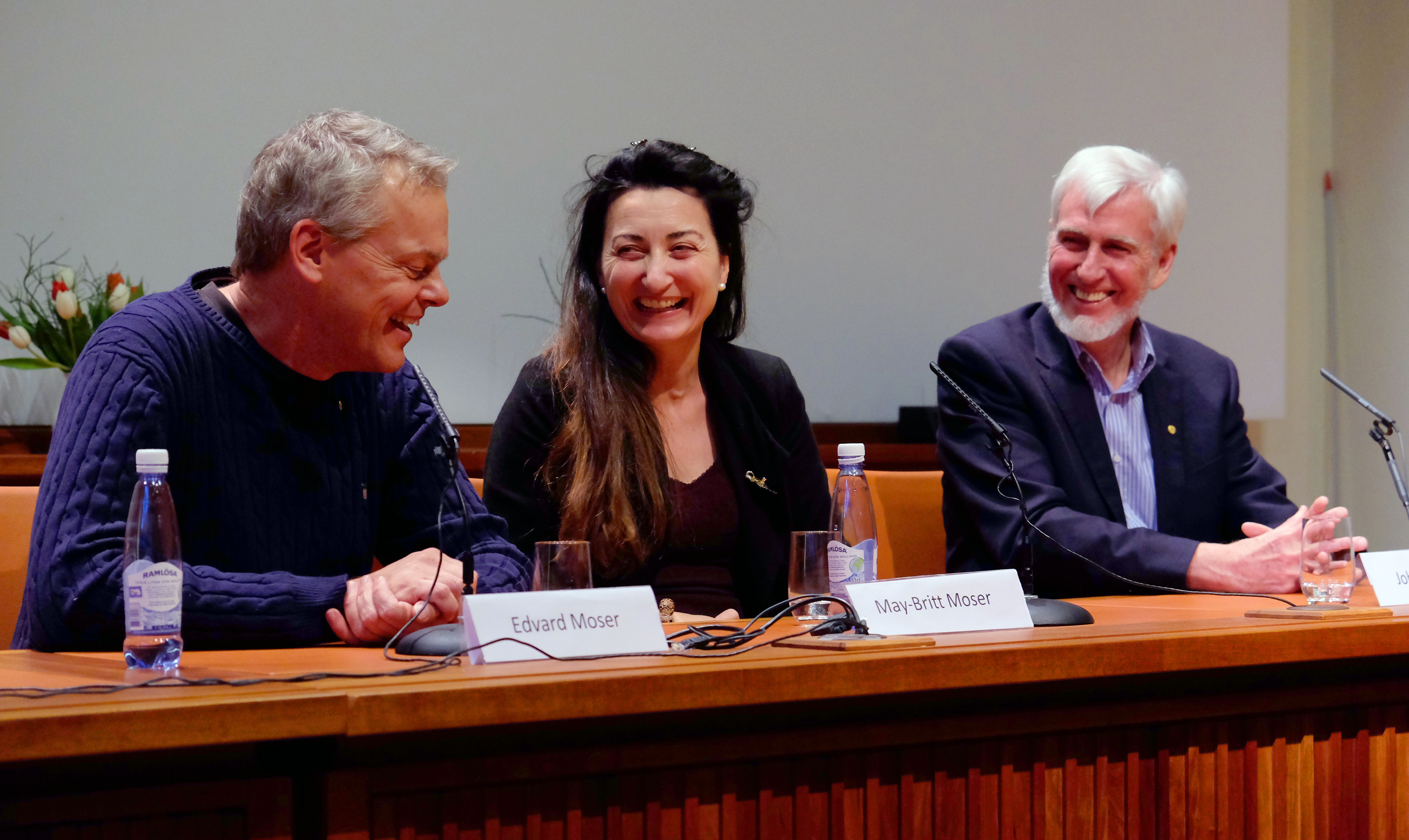
Edvard Moser, May-Britt Moser and John M. O'Keefe in press conference, December 2014

=== Alumni and honorary doctors ===
In 2006, NTNU Alumni was founded, primarily as a meeting place and professional network for former students and staff of NTNU and its precursors. The network is now also open to current employees and students. In 2014 the number of members was around 30,000.

NTNU annually awards honorary doctorates to scientists and others who have made an extraordinary contribution to science or culture.

== See also ==
- Gemini (magazine), research news from NTNU and SINTEF
- Centre for Renewable Energy
- NUTS 1 (satellite)
