= HUNT Biobank =

Biorepository in Levanger, Norway

HUNT Biobank is a biorepository, located in Levanger Municipality, Norway. It was established in conjunction with the cohort study Trøndelag Health Study (HUNT). The biobank is part of HUNT Research Centre, which is responsible for collecting and providing access to the data and samples from the health study, and the research centre is part of the Faculty of Medicine and Health Sciences at the Norwegian University of Science and Technology (NTNU).

The HUNT Study has, so far (2020), been carried out in four main surveys (HUNT1–HUNT4) of the population in the northern part of the county. Until 1 January, 2018, the northern and southern parts of Trøndelag were two separate counties: Nord-Trøndelag and Sør-Trøndelag. The first three HUNT surveys were carried out in Nord-Trøndelag. From 2019 the southern part of the county is included in the survey, in the first phase only by filling in questionnaires.

Comprehensive datasets covering health, disease, lifestyle and environmental factors are gathered by using questionnaires, collecting blood and urine samples and by clinical examination.

In connection with the HUNT3 survey (2006–2008), HUNT Biobank was established as a state-of-the-art biobank, with storage facilities that ensure availability of the biomaterial from the surveys for research decades ahead. Blood sampling follows a strict quality protocol, collecting serum, plasma, buffy coat, immortalized cells for cell line production, specialized tubes for trace metal/elements-analysis, RNA-tubes and urine. Comprehensive datasets covering health, disease, lifestyle and environmental factors are gathered using questionnaires and by clinical examination.

HUNT Biobank is, as part of the HUNT Research Centre, certified for its Management System in conformity with NS-EN ISO 9001:2015.

== Sample types ==
The table gives an overview of the sample types and numbers in The HUNT Study as a whole and how they are stored (2020).

| Participation/ material | HUNT1 | HUNT2 | HUNT3 | Young-HUNT3 | HUNT4 | Young-HUNT4 | Liquid nitrogen | -80 °C | -20 °C | Room temperature |
|---|---|---|---|---|---|---|---|---|---|---|
| Participation (1) | 77,721 | 65,237 | 50,807 | 8,200 (2) | 55,500 | 8,124 | | | | |
| DNA | | 63,000 | 50,000/20,000 (3) | | | | | | | |
| Buffy Coat | | | | | | 52,748 | | x | | |
| ACD | 0 | 0 | 40,754 | 0 | | | x | | | |
| NaHep | 0 | 0 | 25,420 | 0 | | | x | | | |
| Plasma | 0 | 0 | 49,070 | 0 | | | x | | | |
| Serum | 473 | 64,574 | 50,170 | 0 | | | x | x | | |
| Tempus, RNA | 0 | 0 | 14,874 | 0 | | | | x | | |
| Urine (spot urine) | 0 | 0 | 11,983 | 0 | | | | x | | |
| Urine, MA | 0 | 0 | 5,759 | 0 | | | | x | | |
| FTA card | 0 | 0 | 0 | 8,381 | | | | | | x |
