= The Trøndelag Health Study =

Cohort health study conducted in Norway

The Trøndelag Health Study, graphical representation 1984–2019. Of the Young-HUNT studies only 1, 3 and 4 are included. See article text for information on Young-HUNT2

Map of Norway showing the county of Trøndelag in red

The Trøndelag Health Study (The HUNT Study) is a cohort health study performed in the Norwegian county of Trøndelag. HUNT is considered one of the most extensive cohort studies ever conducted in any country. The HUNT Research Centre, which is responsible for collecting and providing access to the data and samples from the study, is part of the Faculty of Medicine and Health Sciences at the Norwegian University of Science and Technology (NTNU).

The study was primarily set up to address arterial hypertension, diabetes, screening of tuberculosis, and quality of life. However, the scope has expanded over time. The population based surveys now contribute to important knowledge regarding health related lifestyle, prevalence and incidence of somatic and mental illness and disease, health determinants, and associations between disease phenotypes and genotypes. Participants may be linked in families and followed up longitudinally between the surveys and in several national health- and other registers covering the total population. The HUNT Study includes data from questionnaires, interviews, clinical measurements and biological samples (blood and urine). The questionnaires include questions on socioeconomic conditions, health related behaviours, symptoms, illnesses and diseases.

From the beginning, in 1984, every citizen of Nord-Trøndelag being 20 years or older, have been invited to all the surveys for adults, and more than 80% of the population (n=130,000) participated. The population of Nord-Trøndelag was both homogeneous and stable, making it especially suited for epidemiological genetic research. HUNT contains a unique database of personal and family medical histories collected during four surveys (HUNT1, 2, 3 and 4) since 1984. On January 1, 2018, the two counties Sør-Trøndelag and Nord-Trøndelag were merged into one county: Trøndelag, and from the fall of 2019, HUNT was expanded to include the entire county.

As of 2017, 170 ph.ds and about 1,700 scientific articles were based on the HUNT material. New articles published in 2017 alone were 110.

In 2017 The HUNT Study was awarded the Karl Evang Prize. This Norwegian prize was established in 1981, as a tribute to the former Director of Health, Karl Evang, for his social-medical pioneering efforts. The aim of the award is to stimulate interest and the work for public health and social conditions that have significance for this.

== Access to the HUNT data ==
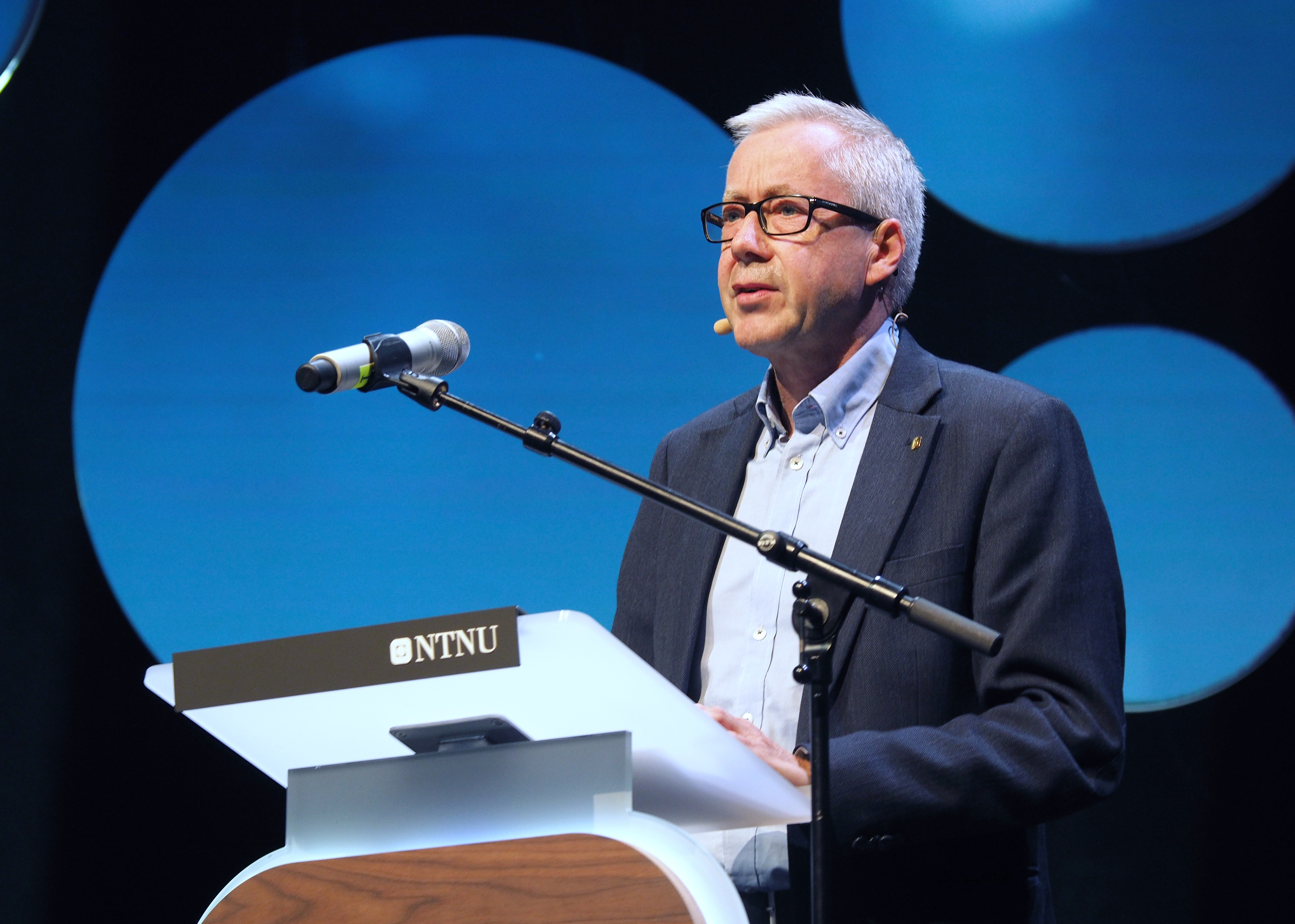
Professor Steinar Krokstad, managing director of Hunt Research Centre

The HUNT Research Centre is divided into a biological repository (HUNT Biobank) and a database made up by more than 5,500 variables (HUNT Databank).

Data from the HUNT Study are available to institutions and researchers who satisfy some basic requirements, whether affiliated in Norway or abroad.

Any institution with research skills can apply for permission to analyze HUNT data. Each project must be approved by the Regional Committee for Medical Research Ethics (REK). If data from sources that are not regulated by the Health Research Act are used, the project must also be reported to the Privacy Ombudsman for Research (NSD).

The project manager should be familiar with the HUNT database and select the relevant variables.

== The HUNT surveys ==
=== HUNT1 (1984–1986) ===
HUNT1, the first of the major health surveys, was conducted from 1984 to 1986, to establish the health history of 75,000 people. All residents in Nord-Trøndelag, 20 years and older, were invited to the study, and 74,599 people, 20 years and older, participated (88.1% of the county's population). The participants filled out two questionnaires. The main objective was to investigate the prevalence of hypertension and diabetes in the population, and to evaluate the quality of treatment for blood pressure patients, people with diabetes, and people with tuberculosis. Blood pressure, height, weight, and X-rays of the chest were collected. HUNT1 was the first health survey in Nord-Trøndelag, and consisted mainly of four sub-studies whose subjects were blood pressure, diabetes, lung disease and quality of life. The purpose of this study was to determine the prevalence of hypertension and diabetes, and to evaluate the quality of life in people with high blood pressure, people with diabetes and people with tuberculosis. Non-fasting blood glucose levels were measured in all participants over 40 years. If the results of this investigation indicated diabetes, the participant was offered a clinical examination as well. Blood samples were not taken in this study. A comprehensive dropout study was also conducted. At present (2020), the database is a valuable resource for epidemiological research, both in cardiovascular diseases, diabetes and quality of life. Studies of cancer and public health have also been performed on this material, and research from HUNT1 data is still ongoing.

=== HUNT2 (1995–1997) ===
HUNT2 was more extensive than HUNT1, because all residents 13 years and older were invited. HUNT2 was divided into Adult- and Young-HUNT. Young-HUNT1 involved the 13- to 19-year-old age group and Adult-HUNT (HUNT2) involved participants 20 years and older. Overall participation in HUNT2 was roughly 75,000 people (70% of the overall population). 61% of the HUNT2 participants also participated in the HUNT1 survey. There were several additional studies in HUNT2, including spirometry and measuring of bone density. HUNT2 was a follow-up of the HUNT1: the questions and comments regarding high blood pressure, diabetes and quality of life were identical or very similar to the questions in HUNT1. HUNT2 was a much larger study, with a larger age range (from 13 years upwards, see section «Young-HUNT1» below), a wider range of subjects, and more data collected for each participant. Overall participation in HUNT2 was roughly 74,000 people (70% of the overall population). 64% of the HUNT2 (Young and adult) participants also participated in the HUNT1 survey. Clinical monitoring, data processing and quality control was performed after data collection was completed, and from autumn 1998 data files have been available to the research community. Besides the questionnaire data and clinical measurements, a venous blood sample was taken from all participants 20 years or older, and after preliminary analysis, both serum samples and whole blood samples were frozen. These are today (2020) stored at minus 70 °C. Blood samples are a source of genetic information, and thus have great potential for research in genetic epidemiology, or the relative importance of genetic and environmental causes of several diseases.

=== HUNT3 (2006–2008) ===
HUNT3 was designed in the same manner as HUNT2, but included more themes. The data was collected through questionnaires and clinical examinations. In addition genetic material, blood, urine (adults) and cell samples from the mouth (youth) were stored in the HUNT biobank. HUNT3 used the slogan "A time for better health". All residents in Nord-Trøndelag, 13 years and older, were again invited to participate. (See section «Young-HUNT3» for persons 13–19 years old) Approximately 105,000 people were invited, and data was collected from roughly 60,000. The overall attendance rate was about 56%, with variations depending on age. The survey used 18 different questionnaires based on the survey in HUNT2. Participants filled out a common form called questionnaire 1 (Q1) and were given questionnaire 2 (Q2) depending on age and gender. In addition, participants could be given one or more of questionnaire 3 (Q3). In addition to this, all adults who had not met in the HUNT study, were sent a short in January 2009 were sent a short questionnaire with some key health and lifestyle variables, to study characteristics of non-responders. Measurements of height, weight, waist circumference, hip width, blood pressure and pulse were collected, as well as bone mass and spirometry measurements. All adults were interviewed about occupation (occupational classification) and health related occupational exposure, and women were interviewed about issues related to pregnancy, childbirth and breastfeeding. Biological material collected in HUNT3 includes blood (5 glasses for different uses) and urine test (fresh or frozen) for adults, and cheek swabs for the youth. As many as 75% of the HUNT3 participants were also screened in the HUNT2 survey. Collection of biological material was the largest investment in HUNT3, resulting in the establishment of a state-of-the-art biobank, HUNT Biobank, with storage facilities that ensure availability of the biomaterial for research decades ahead.

=== HUNT4 (2017–2019) ===
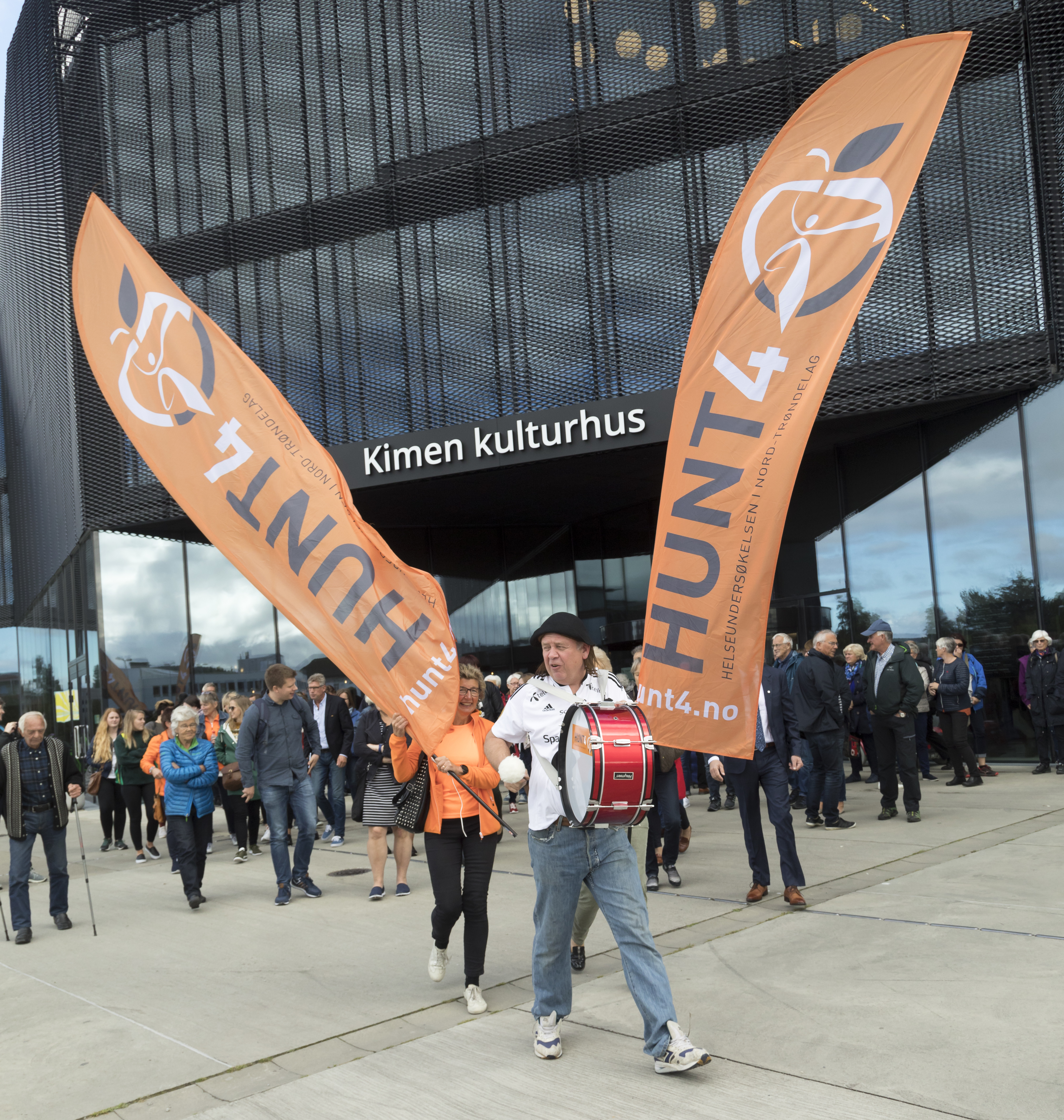
From the «kick off» of HUNT4

HUNT4 was carried out in 2017–2019. 56,044 people from Nord-Trøndelag county participated. Adolescents (13–19) were invited to participate in the survey Young-HUNT4. For the first time the inhabitants of the southern part of the county, Sør-Trøndelag, were invited to answer a questionnaire in 2019.

As the counties of Nord- and Sør-Trøndelag merged in 2018, the study was from then on known as The Trøndelag Health Study, but kept the acronym HUNT.

Several additional projects were implemented in connection with HUNT4:

- Dental health: Dental health for the HUNT4 participants was mapped through a questionnaire and a clinical examination with radiographs. In addition, mucosa, dental and periodontal status were examined, and saliva samples were taken, for biomarker and microbiome analysis.
- The Kondis project: All participants from the Kondis project under HUNT3 were invited to new tests. The project was expanded by inviting all HUNT4 participants with atrial fibrillation to measure cardiac function and cardiac output.
- Brain Trim: The purpose of this study was to investigate the response rate, accuracy and memory of participants of different ages.
- Diet: In this project, the results of the participants' questionnaires were compared with a number of other data, such as anthropometric data, disease-specific data, physical activity, mental health and dental health.
- former inhabitants in Nord-Trøndelag: For this project, HUNT invited everyone who had previously participated in HUNT, and who no longer lived in the county, to answer a questionnaire. Information from participants who later moved out of the county could help elucidate what affects the health and quality of life for different groups in society.
- Hearing: This study should contribute to better knowledge of prevalence, risk factors and consequences of hearing loss. The Public Health Institute was responsible for the project.
- One Health: This was a collaborative project between HUNT, the Norwegian University of Life Sciences and the Veterinary Institute. The main purpose was to investigate how human and animal health and lifestyle affect each other, and to increase our knowledge of specific diseases where human–animal relationships are important.

On March 12, 2020, the HUNT Research Center decided to stop all personal attendance in the follow-up projects under HUNT4 for the time being, due to the risk of infection by the coronavirus. As the COVID-19 situation in Norway is mostly under control and the infection rate is low, some of the projects have later (June 2020–) permitted personal attendance.

=== HUNT 70+ ===
These were also additional projects in connection with HUNT4:

- HUNT 70+: This was an additional study for people over 70 years. The purpose was to gather data that could contribute to research on the health of the elderly for many years to come.
- HUNT 70+ Trondheim: This survey was conducted in the fall of 2018 and spring of 2019. Residents of Østbyen district of Trondheim were invited to participate in this extension of HUNT4. The study consisted of measuring blood pressure, heart rate, height and weight, examination of concentration, memory and attention – and observation of oral and dental health. In addition, participants were interviewed about their own health, and carried an activity monitor for a week.

== Young-HUNT ==
Young-HUNT is the adolescent part of the HUNT Study. Participants are aged 13–19 years. The main topics in Young-HUNT have been asthma and allergies, mental health and quality of life, eating disorders and psychosomatic disorders with special emphasis on headaches. Information about tobacco, alcohol habits, physical activity, health, stages of puberty and literacy problems have also been gathered.

=== Young-HUNT1 (1995–1997) ===
Young-HUNT1 (1995–97) was conducted as part of HUNT2. 9141 adolescents participated (90% response rate).

=== Young-HUNT2 (1999–2000) ===
was a follow-up study of Young-HUNT1, 2400 students participated in both studies (77% of the invited).

=== Young-HUNT3 (2006–2008) ===
Young-HUNT3 (2006–08) was a new cross-sectional study as part of HUNT3. 8677 adolescents participated (87% response rate).

Data collection included self-reported questionnaires, structured interviews, clinical measurements and, in Young-HUNT3, buccal smears. In Young-HUNT3 there was one form similar to the one used in Young-HUNT1. People in the Young-HUNT survey had height, weight, blood pressure, pulse, and spirometry measured.

=== Young-HUNT4 (2017–2019) ===
The Young-HUNT4 Survey (2017-2019) was again a new wave of data gathering concurrent with the HUNT4 Survey. 8066 participants aged 13–19 filled in the questionnaire on tablet computers. In addition, they participated in clinical measurement and an interview, and saliva samples were collected. Most adolescents were recruited through schools, and participated while at school.

== Sources ==
- Krokstad, S.; Langhammer, A.; Hveem, K.; Holmen, T. L.; Midthjell, K.; Stene, T. R.; Bratberg, G.; Heggland, J.; Holmen, J. (1 August 2013). "Cohort Profile: The HUNT Study, Norway". International Journal of Epidemiology. 42 (4): 968–977. doi:10.1093/ije/dys095. ISSN 0300-5771. PMID 22879362.
- J.-A. Zwart, G. Dyb, K. Hagen, K. J. Ødegård, A. A. Dahl, G. Bovim, L. J. Stovner 16 September 2008 "Depression and anxiety disorders associated with headache frequency. The Nord-Trøndelag Health Study" .https://doi.org/10.1046/j.1468-1331.2003.00551.x
