= Loučná (river) =

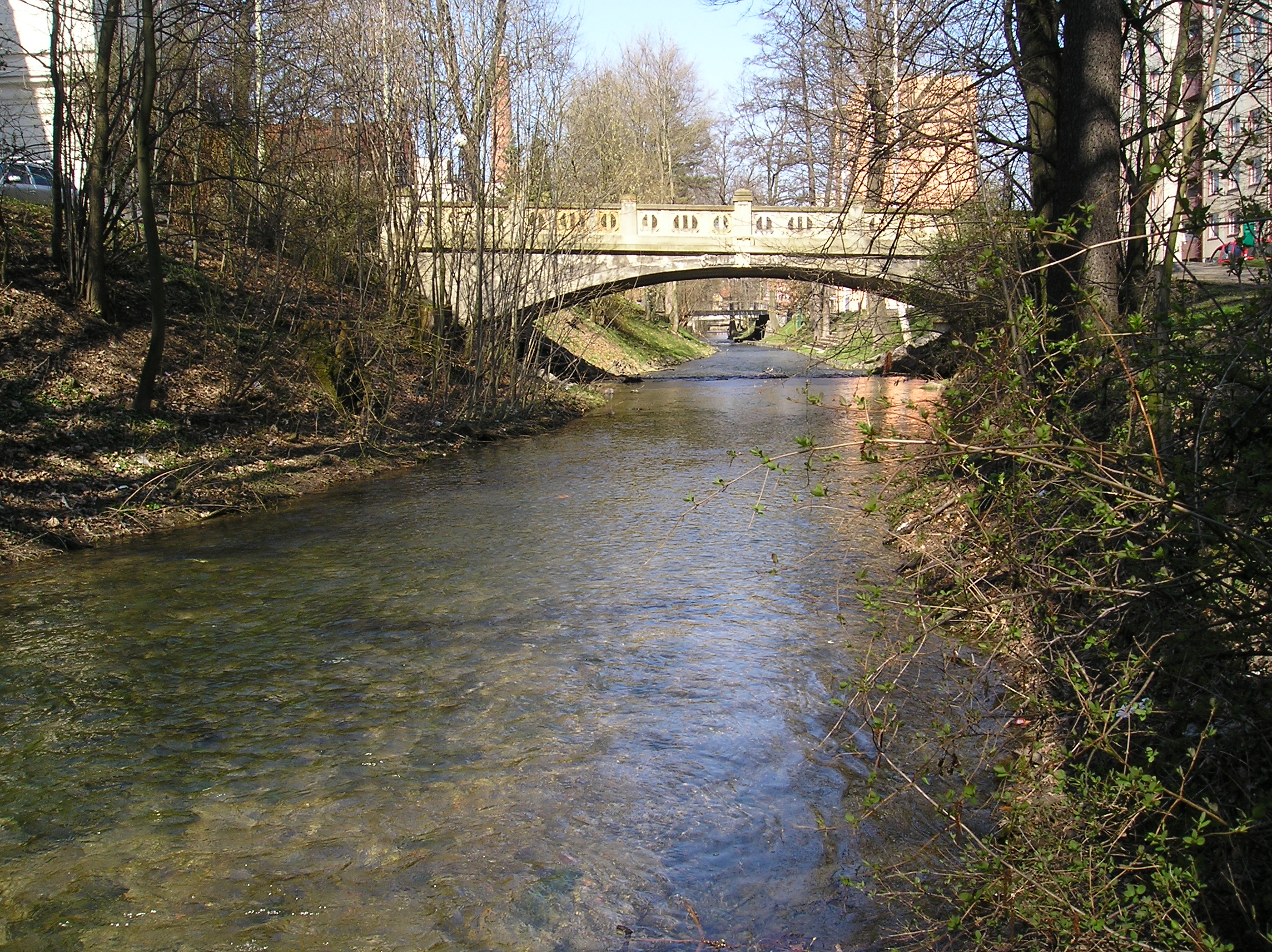
- The Loučná in Litomyšl

Location
- Country: Czech Republic
- Region: Pardubice

Physical characteristics
- Source
  - location: Karle, Svitavy Uplands
  - coordinates: 49°45′55″N 16°22′58″E
  - elevation: 516 m (1,693 ft)
- Mouth
  - location: Elbe
  - coordinates: 50°3′35″N 15°49′23″E
  - elevation: 218 m (715 ft)
- Length: 80.3 km (49.9 mi)
- Basin size: 724.7 km^{2} (279.8 sq mi)
- Discharge
  - average: 4.43 m^{3}/s (156 cu ft/s) near estuary

Basin features
- Progression: Elbe→ North Sea

The Loučná (Czech pronunciation: [ˈloutʃnaː]) is a river in the Czech Republic, a left tributary of the Elbe River. It flows through the Pardubice Region. It is 80.3 km (49.9 mi) long.

== Etymology ==
The name is derived from the Czech word louka, meaning 'meadow'. The name refers to the character of the watershed.

== Characteristic ==
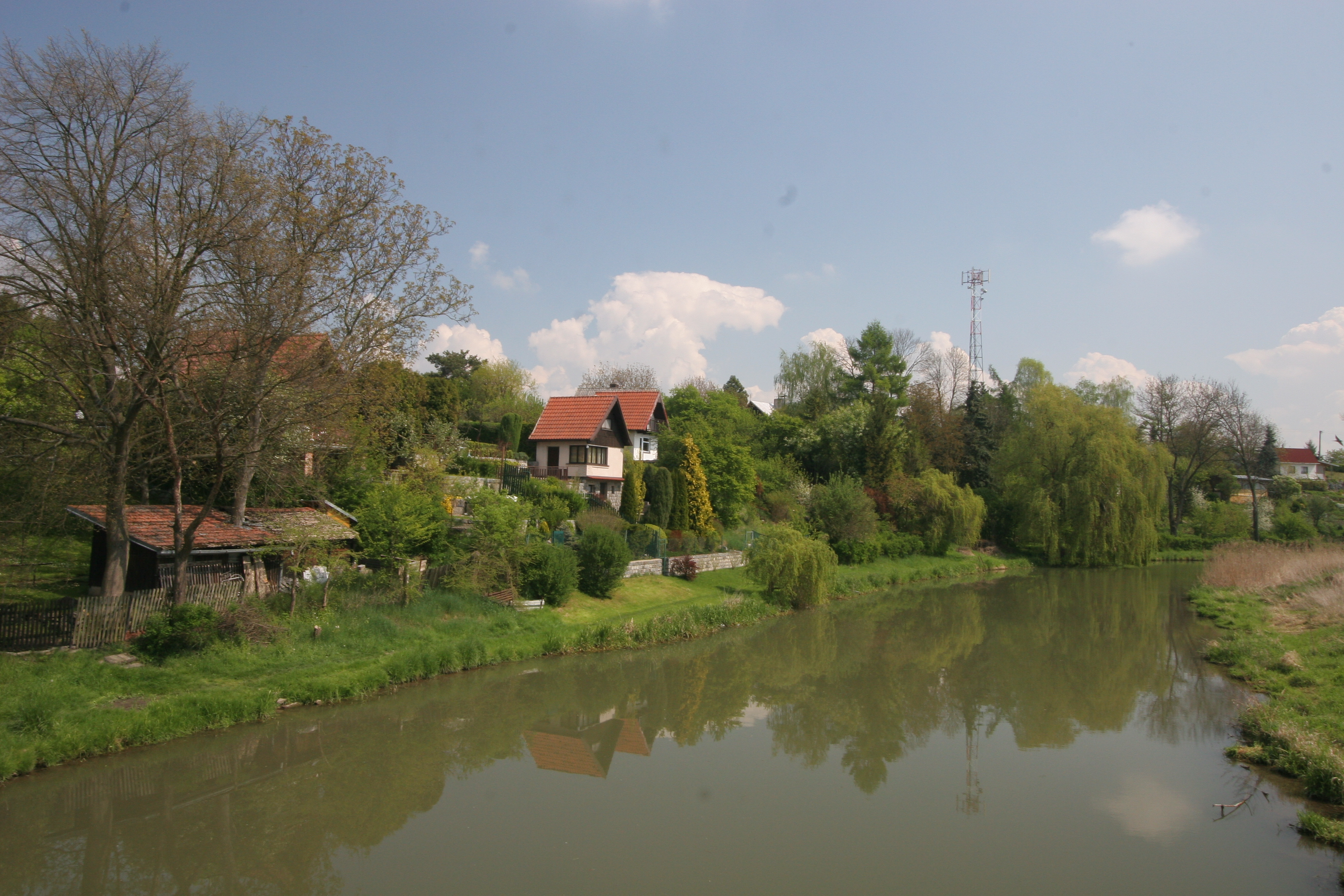
The Loučná near the estuary

The Loučná originates in the territory of Karle in the Svitavy Uplands at an elevation of 516 m (1,693 ft). It flows to Kunětice, where it enters the Elbe River at an elevation of 218 m (715 ft). It is 80.3 km (49.9 mi) long. Its drainage basin has an area of 724.7 km^{2} (279.8 sq mi).

The longest tributaries of the Loučná are:

Tributary	Length (km)	River km	Side
Desná	30.6	55.0	left
Končinský potok	21.5	53.1	right
Jalový potok	17.7	65.9	left
Lodrantka	15.8	6.8	right
Zadní Lodrantka	15.0	2.6	right
Sloupnický potok	13.7	45.8	right
Svařeňka	10.6	22.1	left

== Course ==
The most populous settlements on the river are the towns of Vysoké Mýto and Litomyšl. The river flows through the municipal territories of Karle, Chmelík, Trstěnice, Čistá, Benátky, Litomyšl, Tržek, Cerekvice nad Loučnou, Hrušová, Vysoké Mýto, Tisová, Zámrsk, Slatina, Dobříkov, Týnišťko, Radhošť, Vraclav, Stradouň, Trusnov, Uhersko, Ostrov, Chroustovice, Moravany, Slepotice, Dašice, Lány u Dašic, Sezemice and Kunětice.

== Bodies of water ==
There are 380 bodies of water in the basin area. The largest of them are the fishponds Velký zálešský with an area of 45.8 ha (113 acres) and Chobot with an area of 42.1 ha (104 acres), both built on the tributary Hraniční potok. There are no fishponds or reservoirs built directly on the Loučná.

== Tourism ==
The Loučná is suitable for river tourism. The lower course of the river is navigable almost all year round, but the upper course is navigable only after heavy rains or melting snow. The Loučná is an undemanding river with a slight gradient, suitable for less experienced paddlers.

== See also ==
- List of rivers of the Czech Republic
