= Libecina =

- Municipality
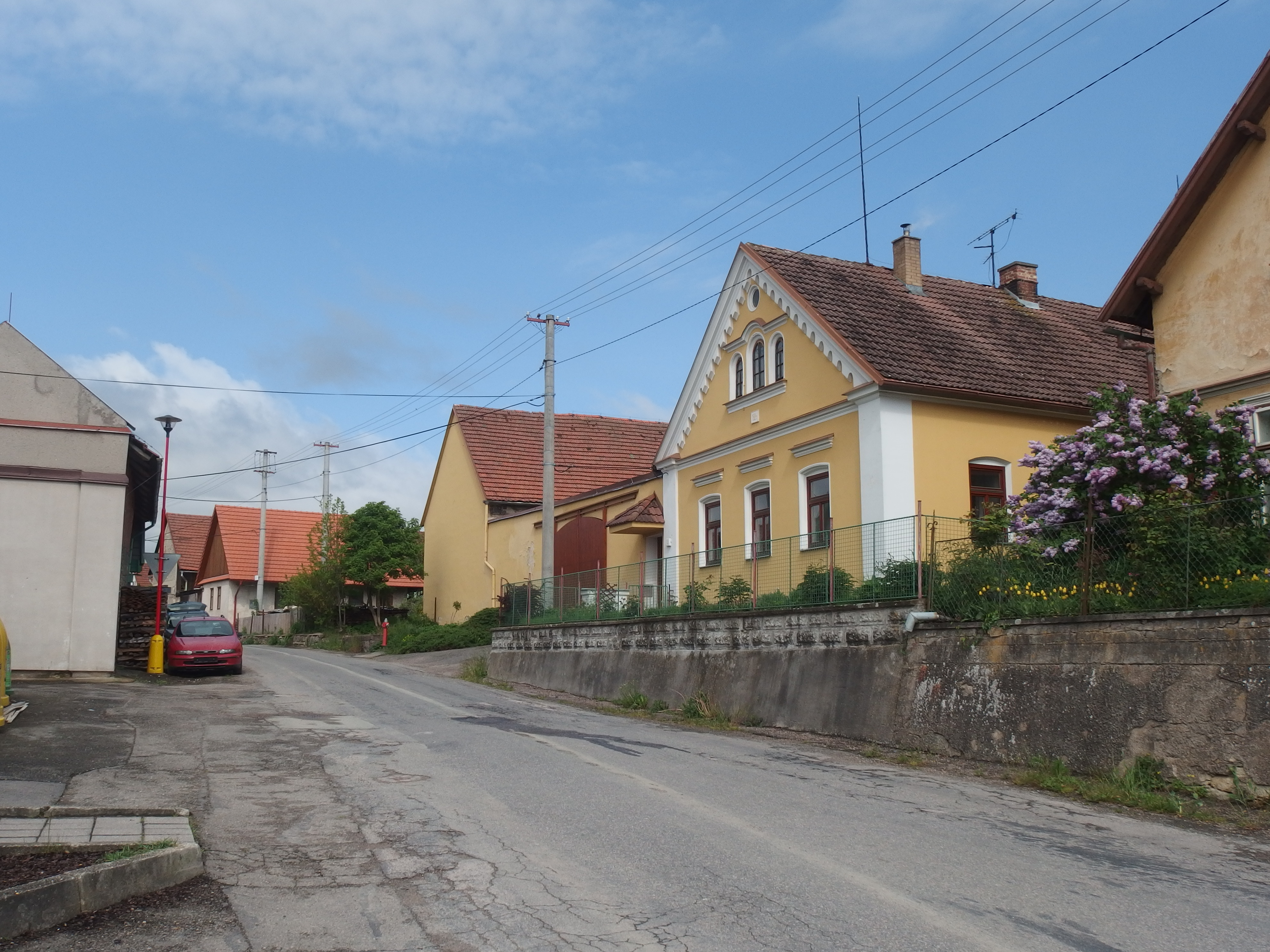
- A street in Libecina

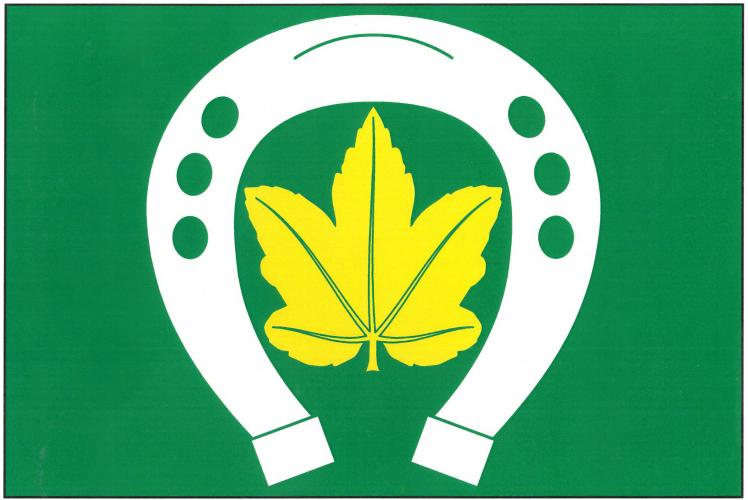
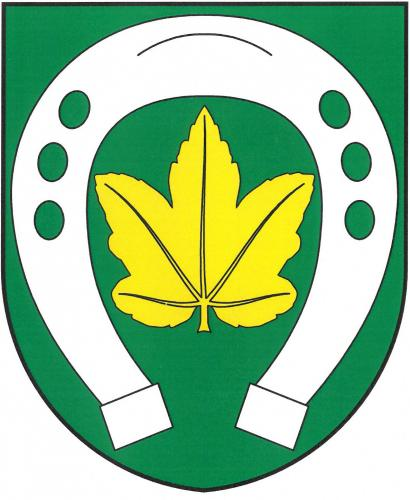
- Flag Coat of arms

- Location in the Czech Republic
- Coordinates: 49°52′59″N 16°7′6″E
- Country: Czech Republic
- Region: Pardubice
- District: Ústí nad Orlicí
- First mentioned: 1461

Area
  - Total: 4.82 km^{2} (1.86 sq mi)
- Elevation: 448 m (1,470 ft)

Population (2026-01-01)
  - Total: 203
  - Density: 42.1/km^{2} (109/sq mi)
- Time zone: UTC+1 (CET)
  - Summer (DST): UTC+2 (CEST)
- Postal code: 566 01
- Website: www.libecina.cz

Libecina (German: Libezina) is a municipality and village in Ústí nad Orlicí District in the Pardubice Region of the Czech Republic. It has about 200 inhabitants.

Libecina lies approximately 23 kilometres (14 mi) southwest of Ústí nad Orlicí, 30 km (19 mi) southeast of Pardubice and 124 km (77 mi) east of Prague.

== Administrative division ==
Libecina consists of two municipal parts (in brackets population according to the 2021 census):

- Libecina (143)
- Javorníček (39)

== Etymology ==
In the oldest documents, the form of the name Libecina often changed, and therefore its origin is unclear. The name may have been derived from the personal name Libata or Libějka.

== Geography ==
Libecina is located about 22 kilometres (14 mi) southwest of Ústí nad Orlicí and 29 km (18 mi) southeast of Pardubice. It lies in the Svitavy Uplands. The highest point is at 489 m (1,604 ft) above sea level.

== History ==
The first written mention of Libecina is from 1461. The village of Javorníček was first mentioned in 1559.

== Demographics ==
Historical population

Year	Pop.	±%
1869	515	—
1880	519	+0.8%
1890	522	+0.6%
1900	512	−1.9%
1910	501	−2.1%

Year	Pop.	±%
1921	498	−0.6%
1930	473	−5.0%
1950	358	−24.3%
1961	353	−1.4%
1970	310	−12.2%

Year	Pop.	±%
1980	241	−22.3%
1991	207	−14.1%
2001	171	−17.4%
2011	171	+0.0%
2021	182	+6.4%

Source: Censuses

== Transport ==
There are no railways or major roads passing through the municipality.

== Sights ==
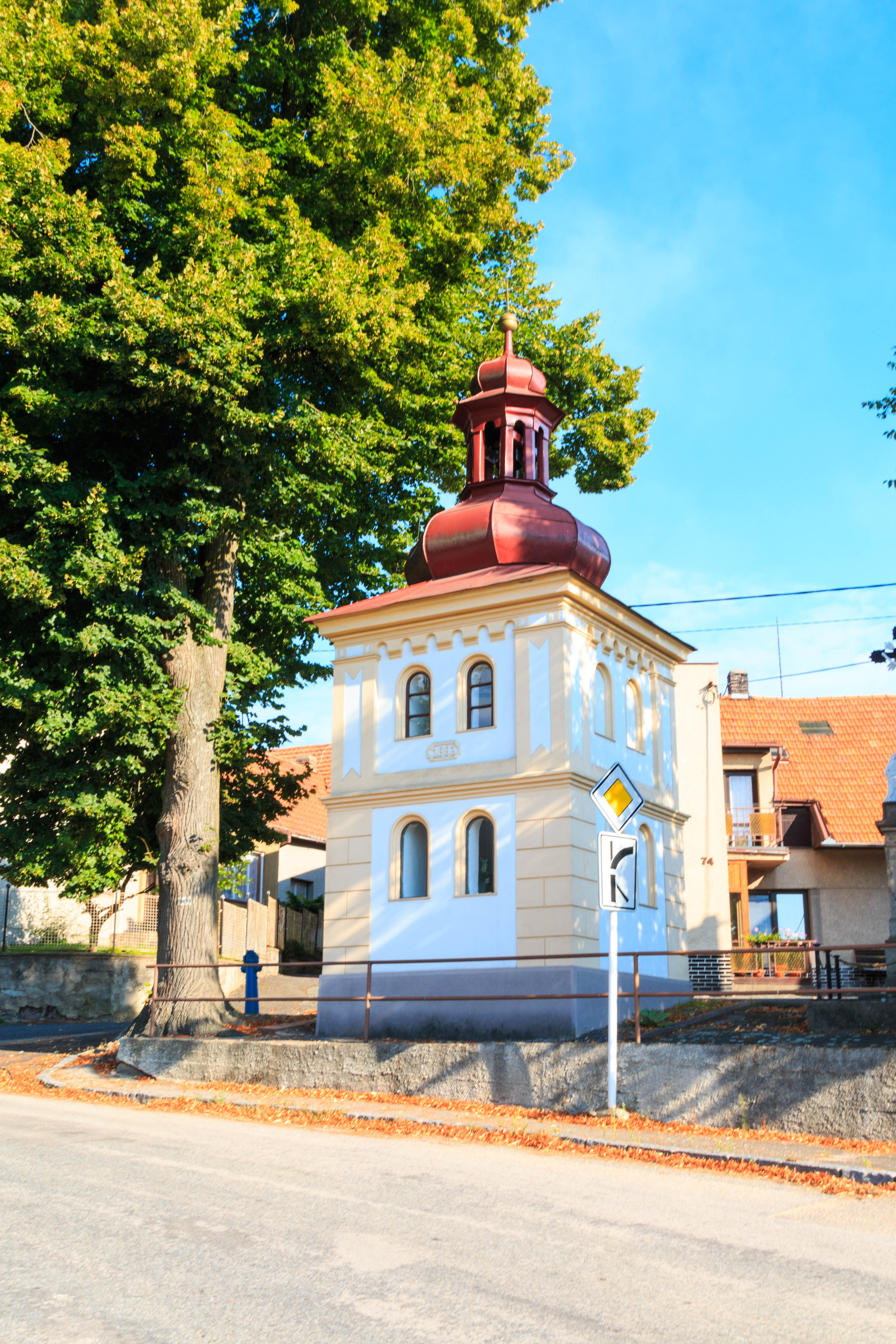
Chapel

There are no protected cultural monuments in the municipality. In the centre of Libecina is a chapel.
