= Karle (Svitavy District) =

- Municipality
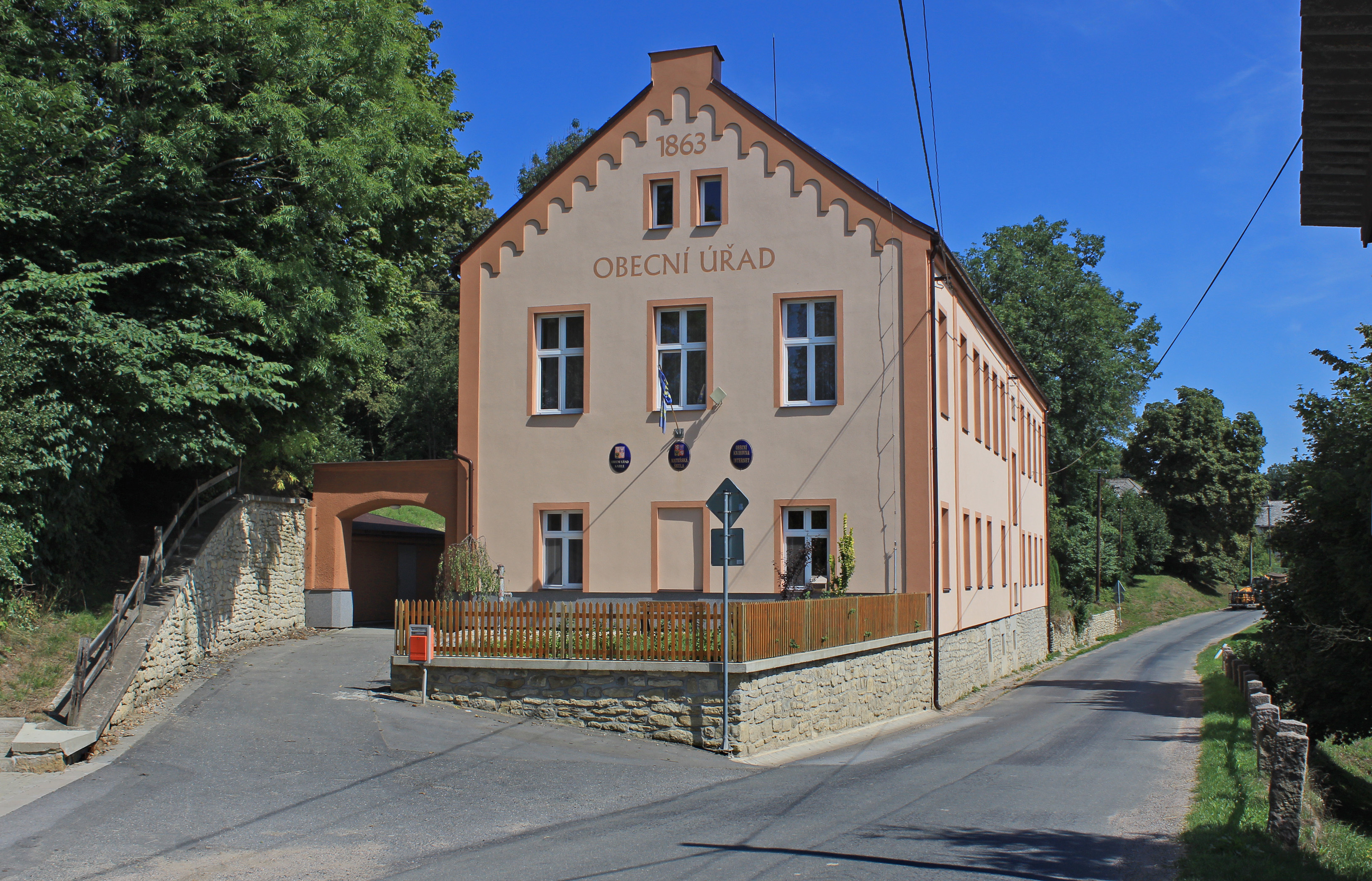
- Municipal office

- Flag Coat of arms

- Location in the Czech Republic
- Coordinates: 49°45′58″N 16°21′53″E
- Country: Czech Republic
- Region: Pardubice
- District: Svitavy
- First mentioned: 1336

Area
  - Total: 19.03 km^{2} (7.35 sq mi)
- Elevation: 492 m (1,614 ft)

Population (2026-01-01)
  - Total: 421
  - Density: 22.1/km^{2} (57.3/sq mi)
- Time zone: UTC+1 (CET)
  - Summer (DST): UTC+2 (CEST)
- Postal code: 568 02
- Website: www.svitavskoweb.cz/karle

Karle (Czech pronunciation: [ˈkarlɛ]; German: Karlsbrunn) is a municipality and village in Svitavy District in the Pardubice Region of the Czech Republic. It has about 400 inhabitants.

== Administrative division ==
Karle consists of two municipal parts (in brackets population according to the 2021 census):

- Karle (304)
- Ostrý Kámen (88)

== Etymology ==
The initial German name of Karle was Karlsbrunn, meaning "Karl's spring". According to legend, the village was previously called Langendorf ('long village') and was renamed after King Charles IV tasted the local spring. The Czech name Karle appeared from the first half of the 19th century and means "Karel's".

== Geography ==
Karle is located about 7 kilometres (4 mi) west of Svitavy and 51 km (32 mi) southeast of Pardubice. It lies in the Svitavy Uplands. The highest point is at 585 m (1,919 ft) above sea level. The Loučná River originates within the municipality and then flows through the village of Karle.

== History ==
The first written mention of Karle is from 1336. From 1347, the village was owned by the Litomyšl bishopric.

== Demographics ==
Historical population

Year	Pop.	±%
1869	988	—
1880	1,010	+2.2%
1890	1,005	−0.5%
1900	1,030	+2.5%
1910	992	−3.7%

Year	Pop.	±%
1921	929	−6.4%
1930	981	+5.6%
1950	575	−41.4%
1961	480	−16.5%
1970	415	−13.5%

Year	Pop.	±%
1980	412	−0.7%
1991	390	−5.3%
2001	378	−3.1%
2011	363	−4.0%
2021	392	+8.0%

Source: Censuses

== Transport ==
The I/34 road (the section from Svitavy to Havlíčkův Brod) runs through the municipality.

== Sights ==
The main landmark of Karle is the Church of Saint Bartholomew. It was founded in 1350 and rebuilt in 1814.

The only protected monument in the municipality is the Chapel of the Saint Cyril and Methodius. It was built in the late Baroque style in the second half of the 18th century.
