= Dolany (Olomouc District) =

Municipality in the Czech Republic

- Municipality
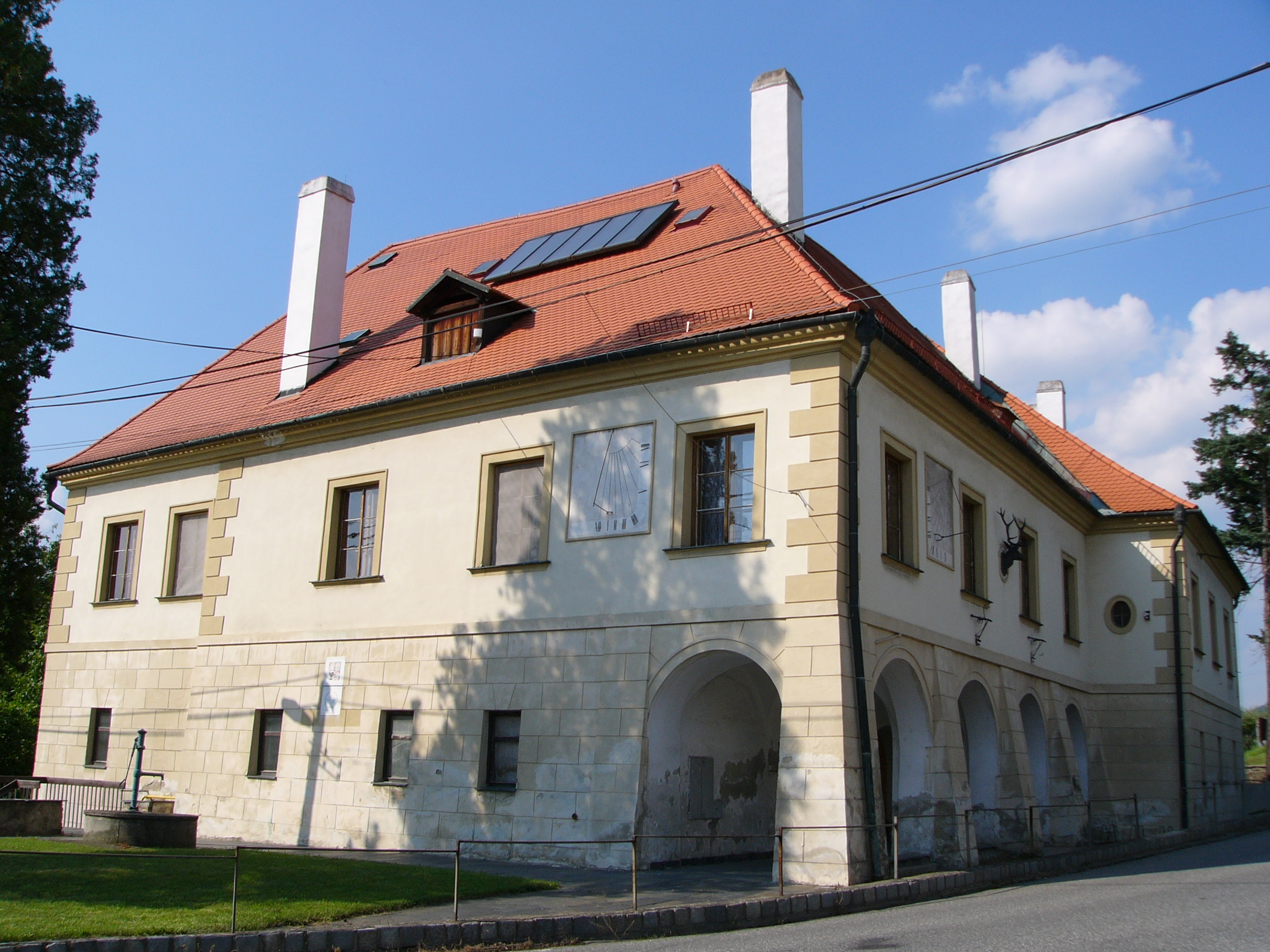
- Dolany Castle, now the municipal office

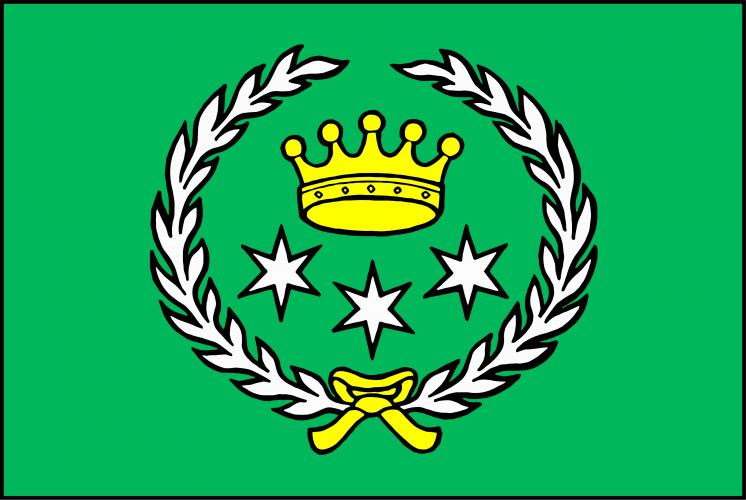
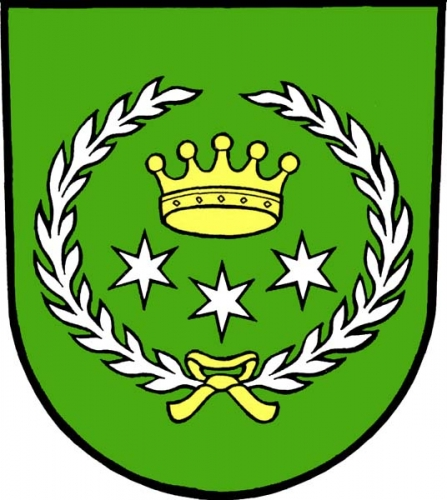
- Flag Coat of arms

- Location in the Czech Republic
- Coordinates: 49°39′0″N 17°19′21″E
- Country: Czech Republic
- Region: Olomouc
- District: Olomouc
- First mentioned: 1235

Area
  - Total: 23.77 km^{2} (9.18 sq mi)
- Elevation: 254 m (833 ft)

Population (2026-01-01)
  - Total: 2,876
  - Density: 121.0/km^{2} (313.4/sq mi)
- Time zone: UTC+1 (CET)
  - Summer (DST): UTC+2 (CEST)
- Postal code: 783 16
- Website: www.dolany-ol.cz

Dolany is a municipality and village in Olomouc District in the Olomouc Region of the Czech Republic. It has about 2,900 inhabitants.

== Administrative division ==
Dolany consists of three municipal parts (in brackets population according to the 2021 census):

- Dolany (2,274)
- Pohořany (255)
- Véska (253)

== Geography ==
Dolany is located about 7 kilometres (4 mi) northeast of Olomouc. It lies on the border between the Nízký Jeseník range and Upper Morava Valley. The highest point is the hill Jedová at 633 m (2,077 ft) above sea level. The stream Dolanský potok flows through the municipality.

== History ==
The first written mention of Dolany is from 1235. In 1355 and 1368, the village, then divided into two parts, was sold to Beneš of Wildenberk and was joined to the Bouzov estate In 1379, Dolany was acquired by the newly established Carthusian monastery in Tržek. In 1386–1388, the Vallis Josaphat monastery was built in Dolany and the Carthusians moved there from Tržek.

In 1425, during the Hussite Wars, the monastery was destroyed and the Carthusians moved to Olomouc. In 1619, properties of the Carthusians were confiscated and Dolany became a property of the Liechtenstein family. They owned it until the establishment of a sovereign municipality in 1850.

== Demographics ==
Historical population

Year	Pop.	±%
1869	2,087	—
1880	2,119	+1.5%
1890	2,158	+1.8%
1900	2,188	+1.4%
1910	2,350	+7.4%

Year	Pop.	±%
1921	2,271	−3.4%
1930	2,450	+7.9%
1950	1,911	−22.0%
1961	2,041	+6.8%
1970	1,952	−4.4%

Year	Pop.	±%
1980	1,942	−0.5%
1991	1,802	−7.2%
2001	1,940	+7.7%
2011	2,520	+29.9%
2021	2,782	+10.4%

Source: Censuses

== Transport ==
The I/46 road (heading from Olomouc to Opava and the Czech–Polish border) runs through the municipality.

== Sights ==
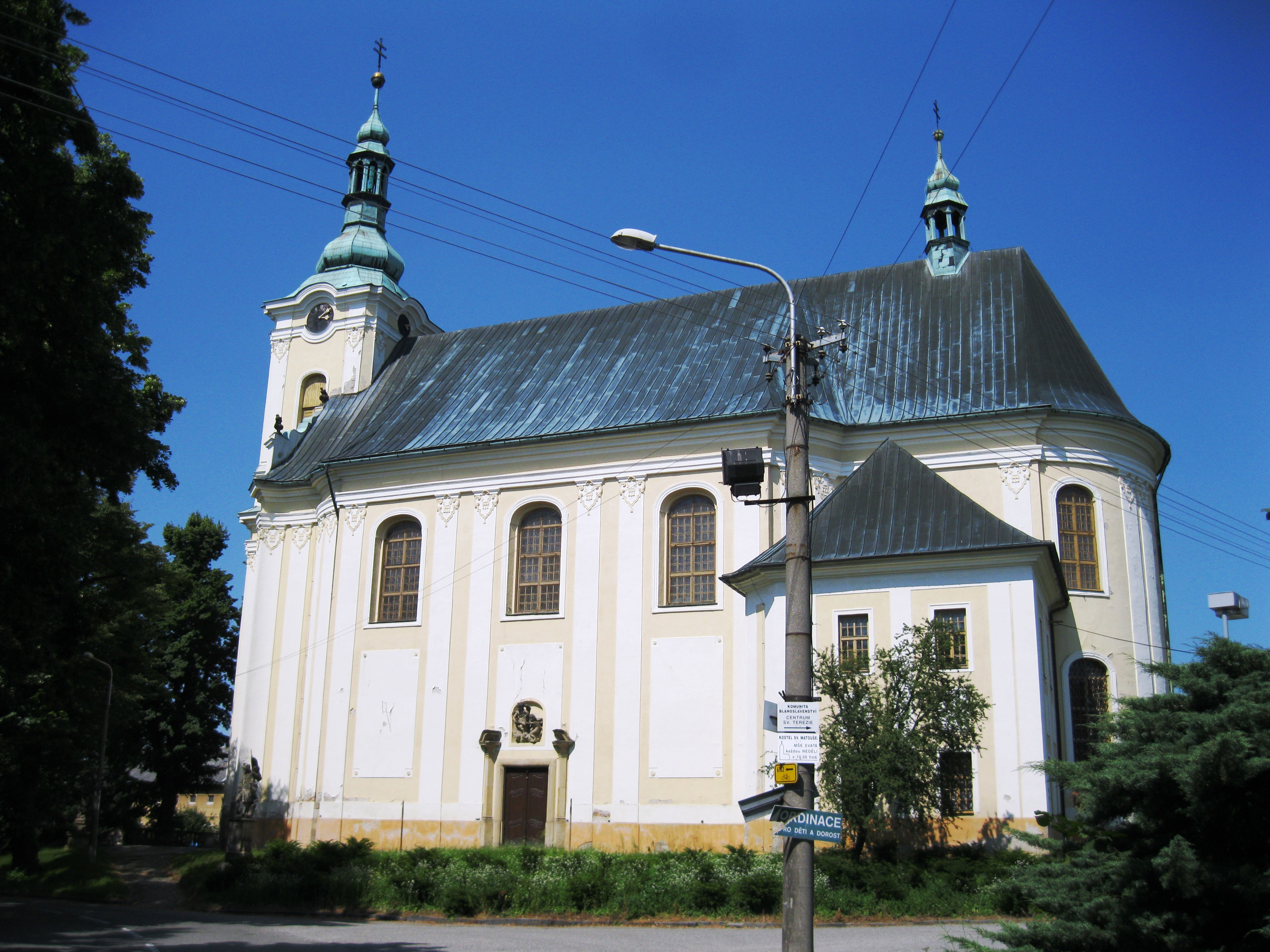
Church of Saint Matthew

The main landmark of Dolany is the Church of Saint Matthew. It was built in the late Baroque style in 1776–1785. The balustrade staircase and the surroundings of the church are decorated with valuable Baroque sculptures from the first half of the 18th century.

The Dolany Castle was originally a late Renaissance feudal residence from 1667, rebuilt in the early Baroque style. Today it houses the municipal office.

The ruins of the Carthusian monastery are still visible today, but only a few remains have survived.
