= Trstěnice (Svitavy District) =

- Municipality
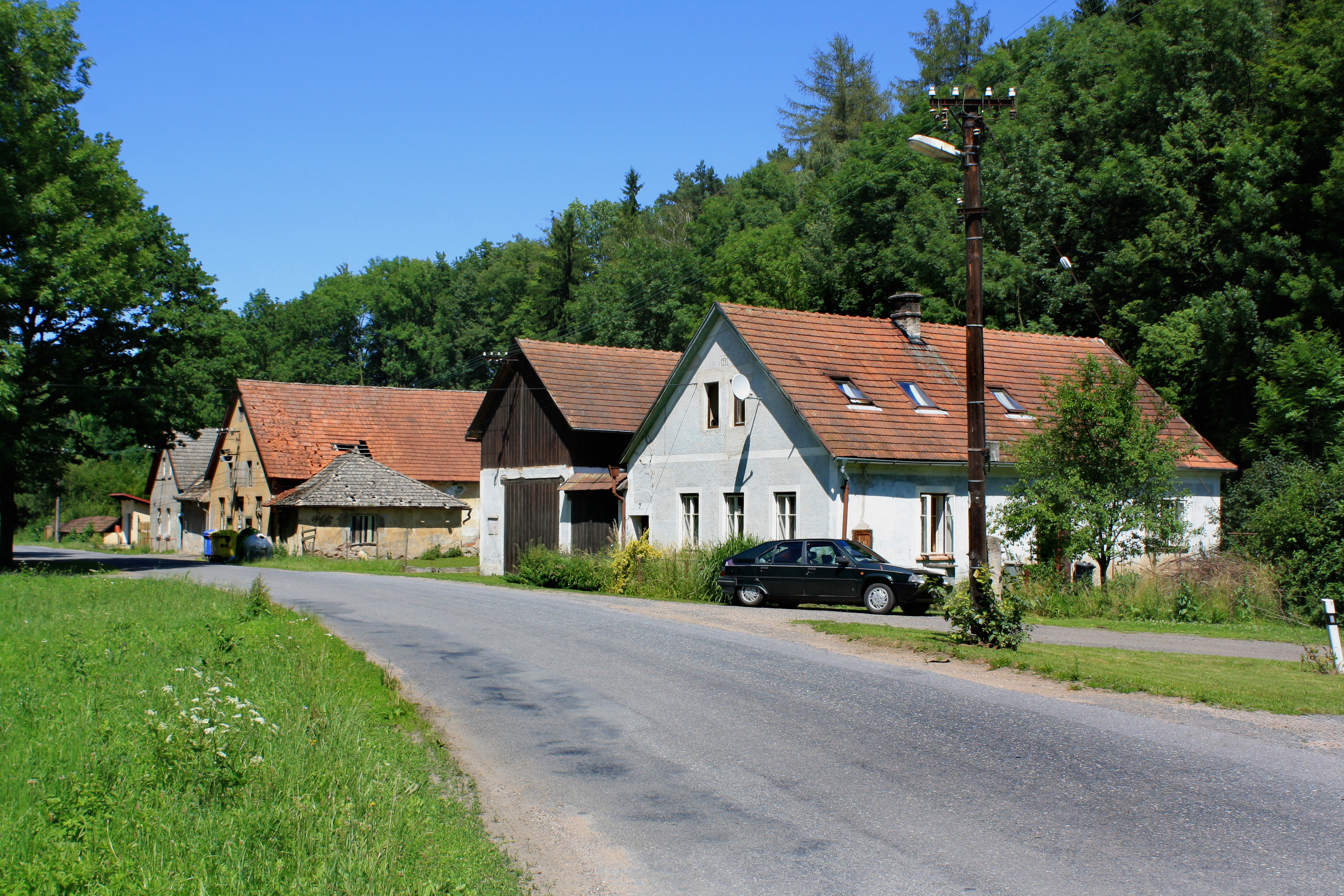
- Northern part of Trstěnice

- Flag Coat of arms

- Location in the Czech Republic
- Coordinates: 49°47′39″N 16°20′56″E
- Country: Czech Republic
- Region: Pardubice
- District: Svitavy
- First mentioned: 993

Area
  - Total: 21.48 km^{2} (8.29 sq mi)
- Elevation: 423 m (1,388 ft)

Population (2026-01-01)
  - Total: 547
  - Density: 25.5/km^{2} (66.0/sq mi)
- Time zone: UTC+1 (CET)
  - Summer (DST): UTC+2 (CEST)
- Postal code: 569 57
- Website: www.trstenice.cz

Trstěnice is a municipality and village in Svitavy District in the Pardubice Region of the Czech Republic. It has about 500 inhabitants.

== Etymology ==
The Czech words třtí or trstí used to be terms for common reed. The adjective trstěná, from which the name of the village is derived, denoted a river flowing through the common reed.

== Geography ==
Trstěnice is located about 9 kilometres (6 mi) northwest of Svitavy and 48 km (30 mi) southeast of Pardubice. It lies in the Svitavy Uplands. The highest point is at 579 m (1,900 ft) above sea level. The village is situated in the valley of the Loučná River.

== History ==
The first written mention of Trstěnice is from 993. The village gave its name to the Trstěnice Route, which was an important medieval trade route that connected Bohemia and Moravia.

== Demographics ==
Historical population

Year	Pop.	±%
1869	1,059	—
1880	1,095	+3.4%
1890	1,074	−1.9%
1900	1,119	+4.2%
1910	1,181	+5.5%

Year	Pop.	±%
1921	1,137	−3.7%
1930	1,056	−7.1%
1950	695	−34.2%
1961	662	−4.7%
1970	626	−5.4%

Year	Pop.	±%
1980	547	−12.6%
1991	490	−10.4%
2001	471	−3.9%
2011	509	+8.1%
2021	510	+0.2%

Source: Censuses

== Transport ==
There are no railways or major roads passing through the municipality.

== Sights ==
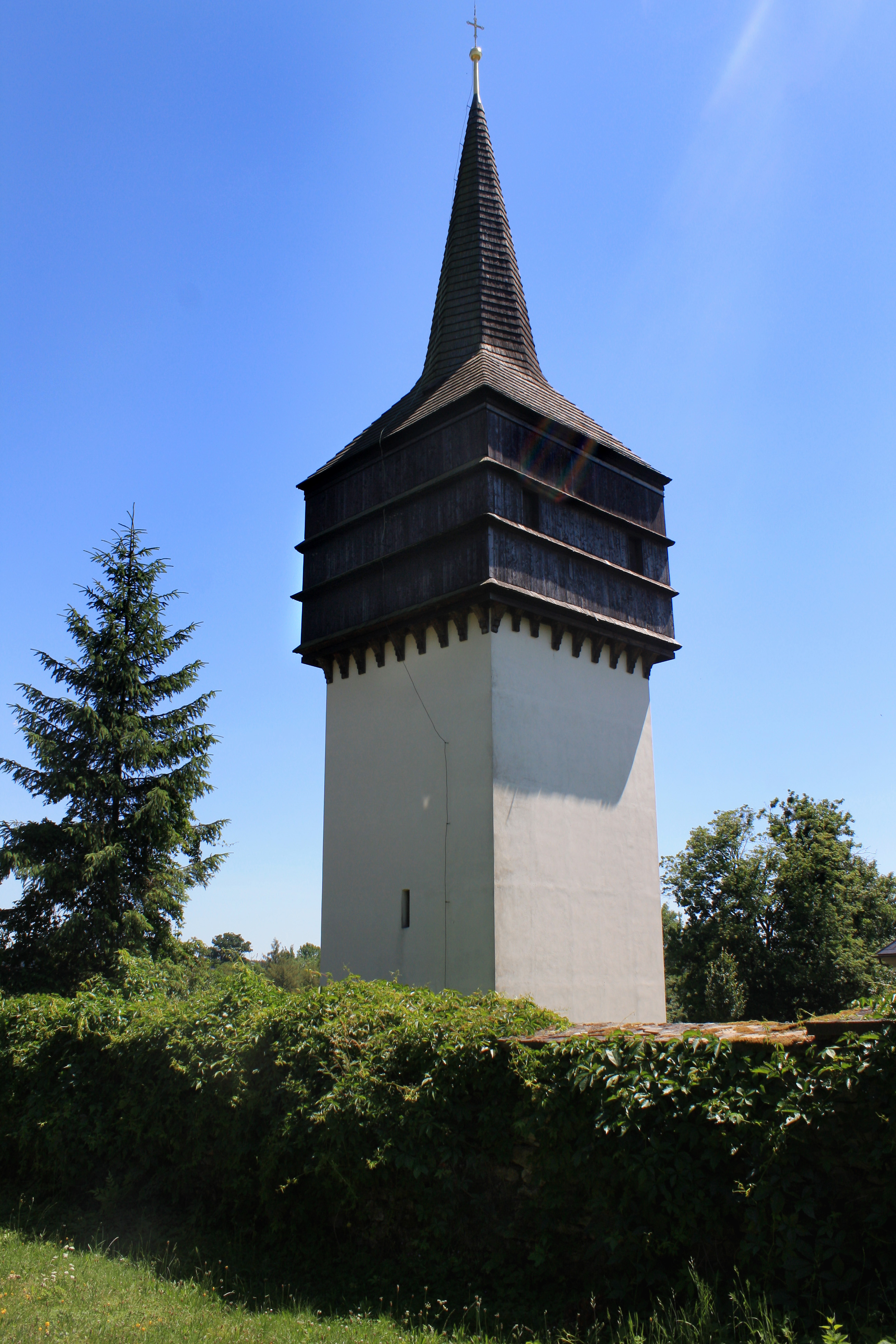
Bell tower

The main landmark of Trstěnice is the Church of the Finding of the Holy Cross. It was first documented in 1350. It is originally a Gothic building, later rebuilt in the Baroque style. Next to the church stands a separate bell tower. It is one of the most valuable fortificated church complexes in Bohemia.
