= Čistá (Svitavy District) =

- Municipality
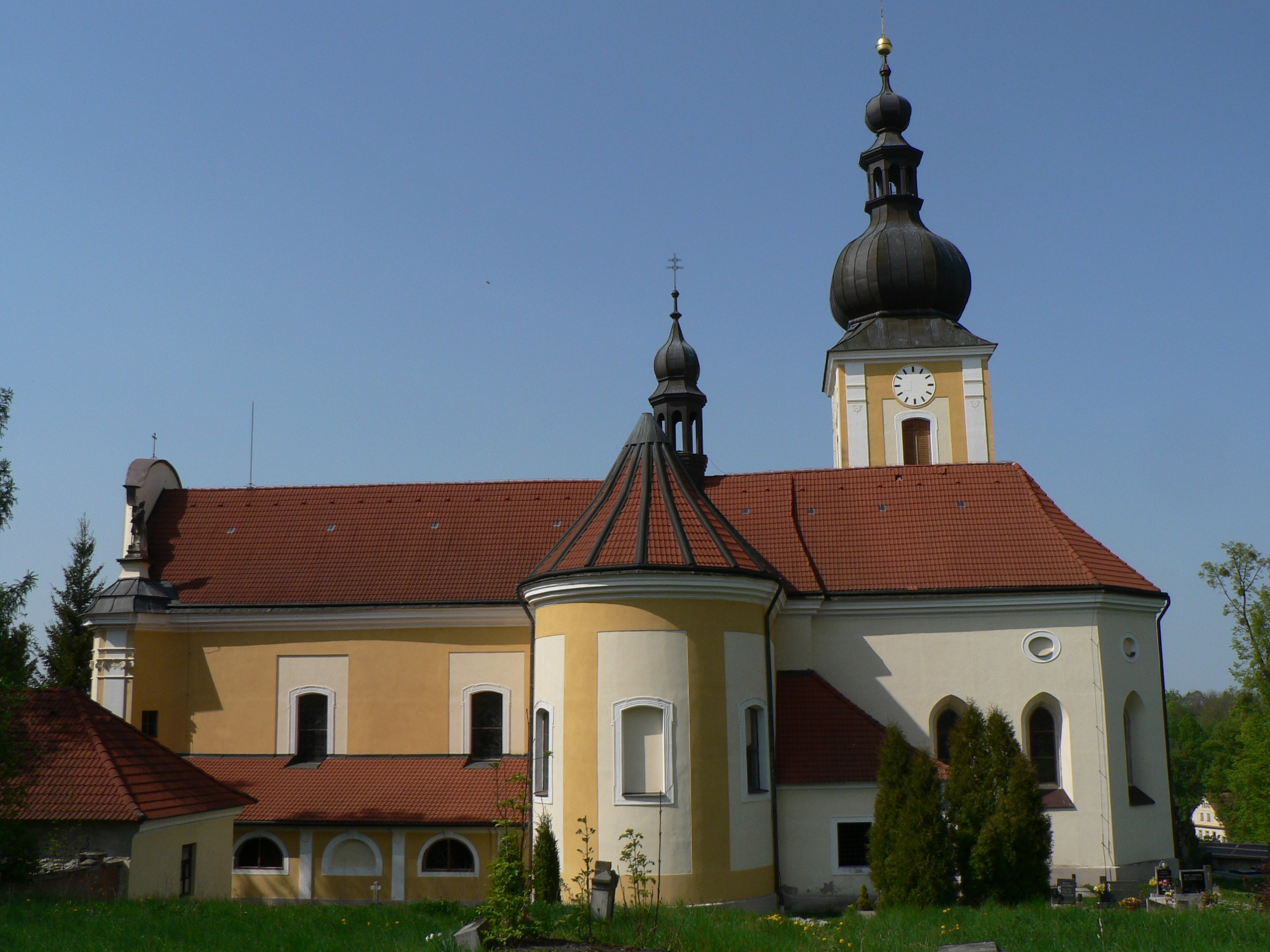
- Church of Saint Nicholas

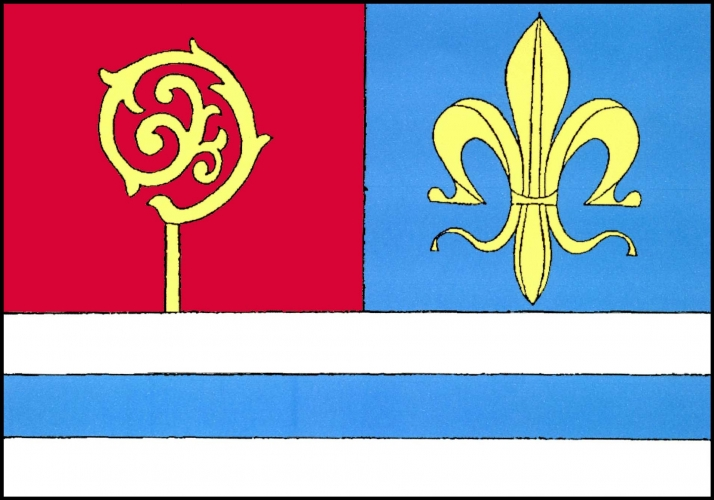
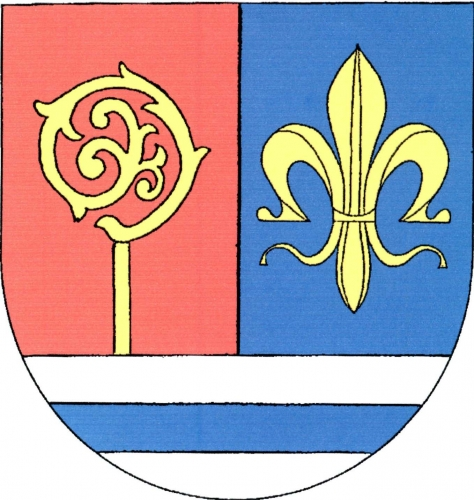
- Flag Coat of arms

- Location in the Czech Republic
- Coordinates: 49°49′38″N 16°19′43″E
- Country: Czech Republic
- Region: Pardubice
- District: Svitavy
- First mentioned: 1347

Area
  - Total: 25.22 km^{2} (9.74 sq mi)
- Elevation: 385 m (1,263 ft)

Population (2026-01-01)
  - Total: 1,067
  - Density: 42.31/km^{2} (109.6/sq mi)
- Time zone: UTC+1 (CET)
  - Summer (DST): UTC+2 (CEST)
- Postal codes: 569 56, 569 57
- Website: www.cista.info

Čistá (until 1947 Litrbachy; German: Lauterbach) is a municipality and village in Svitavy District in the Pardubice Region of the Czech Republic. It has about 1,100 inhabitants. The most important monument is the homestead No. 171, protected as a national cultural monument.

== Etymology ==
According to the most probable theory, the initial German name Lauterbach (i.e. 'clean stream') used to be a local German name of the river Loučná, which was transferred to the settlement. Until 1947, the municipality was called Litrbachy (the Czech name, created by transciption of the German name). From 1947, it has been called Čistá (i.e. 'clean', clear').

== Geography ==
Čistá is located about 11 kilometres (7 mi) northwest of Svitavy and 45 km (28 mi) southeast of Pardubice. It lies in the Svitavy Uplands. The highest point is at 580 m (1,900 ft) above sea level. The village is situated in the valley of the Loučná River.

== History ==
The first written mention of Čistá is from 1347. The village was probably founded in the 13th century, during the colonisation by the monastery in Litomyšl. Until 1421, it was a property of the Litomyšl bishopric. From 1421 until the establishment of an independent municipality in 1850, the village belonged to the Litomyšl estate.

Until World War II, the village has a German majority. After World War II, the German-speaking inhabitants were expelled and the village was resettled by Czechs.

== Demographics ==
Historical population

Year	Pop.	±%
1869	1,667	—
1880	1,714	+2.8%
1890	1,813	+5.8%
1900	1,730	−4.6%
1910	1,986	+14.8%

Year	Pop.	±%
1921	1,657	−16.6%
1930	1,557	−6.0%
1950	1,003	−35.6%
1961	914	−8.9%
1970	798	−12.7%

Year	Pop.	±%
1980	858	+7.5%
1991	837	−2.4%
2001	866	+3.5%
2011	912	+5.3%
2021	944	+3.5%

Source: Censuses

== Transport ==
There are no railways or major roads passing through the municipality.

== Sights ==
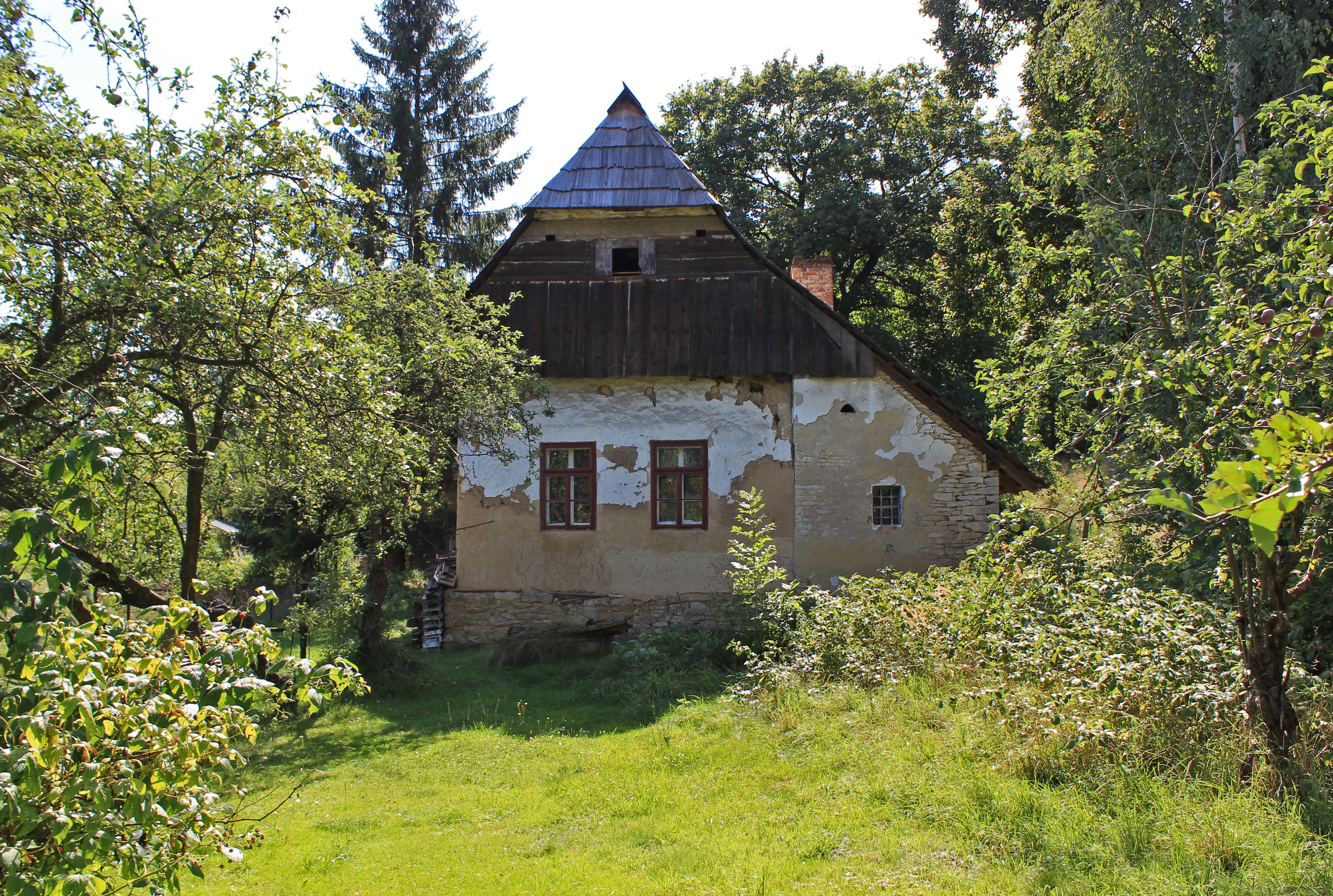
Homestead No. 171

The main landmark of Čistá is the Church of Saint Nicholas. Originally a Gothic church from the second half of the 14th century, it was modified in the Renaissance style in 1583, and then rebuilt in the Baroque style in the 1740s and 1770s.

The most important monument, protected as a national cultural monument, is the homestead No. 171. It is one of the two most valuable and best-preserved timbered homesteads in the region. Its oldest part dates from the 1580s and its extension dates from the second half of the 17th century. Most of the house's current appearance is the result of reconstruction at the beginning of the 18th century and the house was further rebuilt in the first half of the 19th century.
