= Moravany (Pardubice District) =

- Municipality
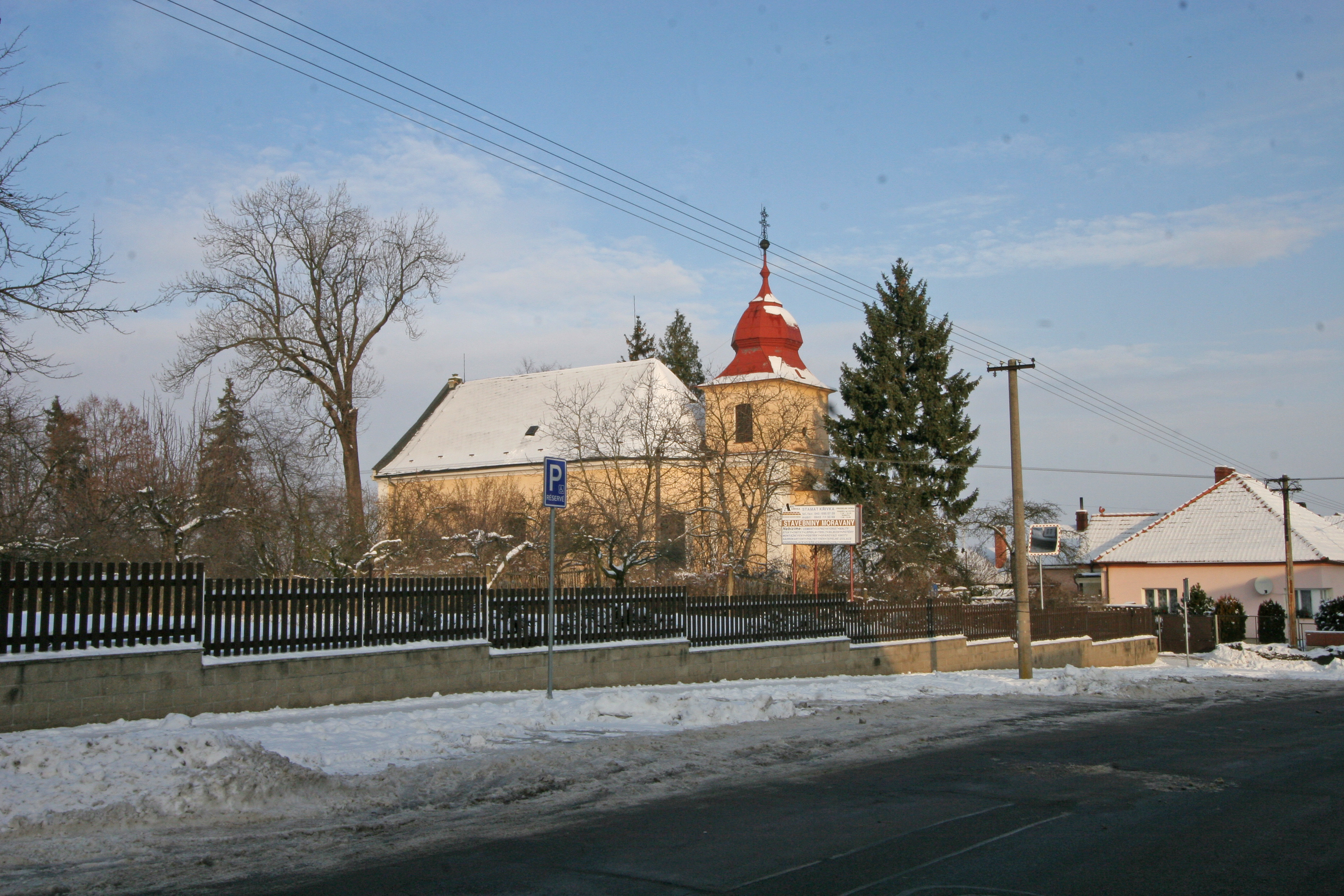
- Church of Saints Peter and Paul

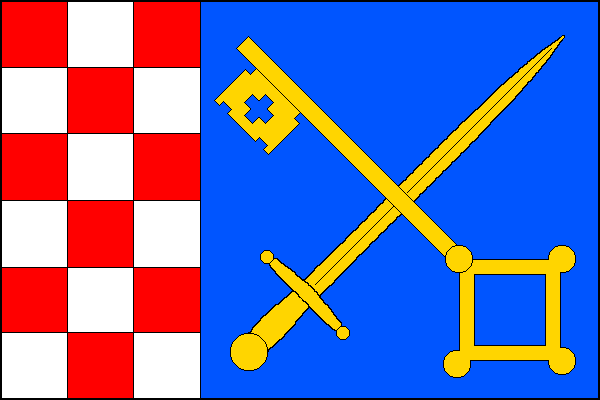
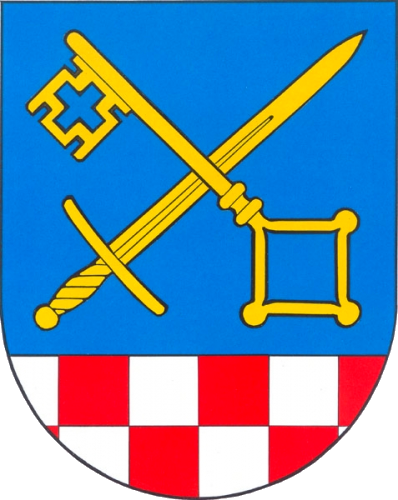
- Flag Coat of arms

- Location in the Czech Republic
- Coordinates: 50°0′4″N 15°56′27″E
- Country: Czech Republic
- Region: Pardubice
- District: Pardubice
- First mentioned: 1244

Area
  - Total: 16.41 km^{2} (6.34 sq mi)
- Elevation: 242 m (794 ft)

Population (2026-01-01)
  - Total: 1,887
  - Density: 115.0/km^{2} (297.8/sq mi)
- Time zone: UTC+1 (CET)
  - Summer (DST): UTC+2 (CEST)
- Postal codes: 530 02, 533 72, 534 01
- Website: www.obec-moravany.cz

Moravany is a municipality and village in Pardubice District in the Pardubice Region of the Czech Republic. It has about 1,900 inhabitants.

== Administrative division ==
Moravany consists of six municipal parts (in brackets population according to the 2021 census):

- Moravany (1,251)
- Čeradice (56)
- Moravanský (95)
- Platěnice (231)
- Platěnsko (21)
- Turov (130)

== Etymology ==
The name indicates a village inhabited by people who came from Moravia (Moravians).

== Geography ==
Moravany is located about 12 kilometres (7 mi) east of Pardubice. It lies in a flat agricultural landscape in the East Elbe Table, on the edge of the Polabí region. The Loučná River flows through the municipality. A flooded quarry called Duhový rybník is located north of the village of Moravany.

== History ==
The first written mention of Moravany is from 1244, when there already was a stronghold with a small settlement around it. In the 16th and 17th century there were many ponds but they were later dried during the German colonisation and during the reign of Joseph II in 1782 they were turned into arable and given to settlers, mainly to the German ones.

In 1806 the Crown Prince passed through Moravany, later known as the Emperor Ferdinand I of Austria. The settlers solicited designation of a priest and the building of a rectory although the foundation of a new church had been laid down in 1782 after the old one had burned to the ground. The rectory was then built in 1808. There were two bells in the steeple until the 1816 when one of them was taken away for military purposes. The church as it stands now was built in the 1920s in the place of the burned church.

The railway was built in 1845.

== Demographics ==
Historical population

Year	Pop.	±%
1869	1,596	—
1880	1,793	+12.3%
1890	1,860	+3.7%
1900	1,929	+3.7%
1910	1,989	+3.1%

Year	Pop.	±%
1921	2,097	+5.4%
1930	2,067	−1.4%
1950	1,783	−13.7%
1961	1,883	+5.6%
1970	1,854	−1.5%

Year	Pop.	±%
1980	1,844	−0.5%
1991	1,698	−7.9%
2001	1,671	−1.6%
2011	1,781	+6.6%
2021	1,784	+0.2%

Source: Censuses

== Transport ==
Moravany is located on the railway lines Kolín–Česká Třebová via Pardubice and Chrudim–Moravany.

== Sights ==
The most significant monument is the Church of Saints Peter and Paul. It is a late Baroque building from 1782. It includes a fresco of the coronation of the Virgin Mary by Josef Kramolín.

The 50th parallel passes through Moravany. It is marked with a plaque on the square Náměstí Hrdinů.
