= Sezemice =

- Town
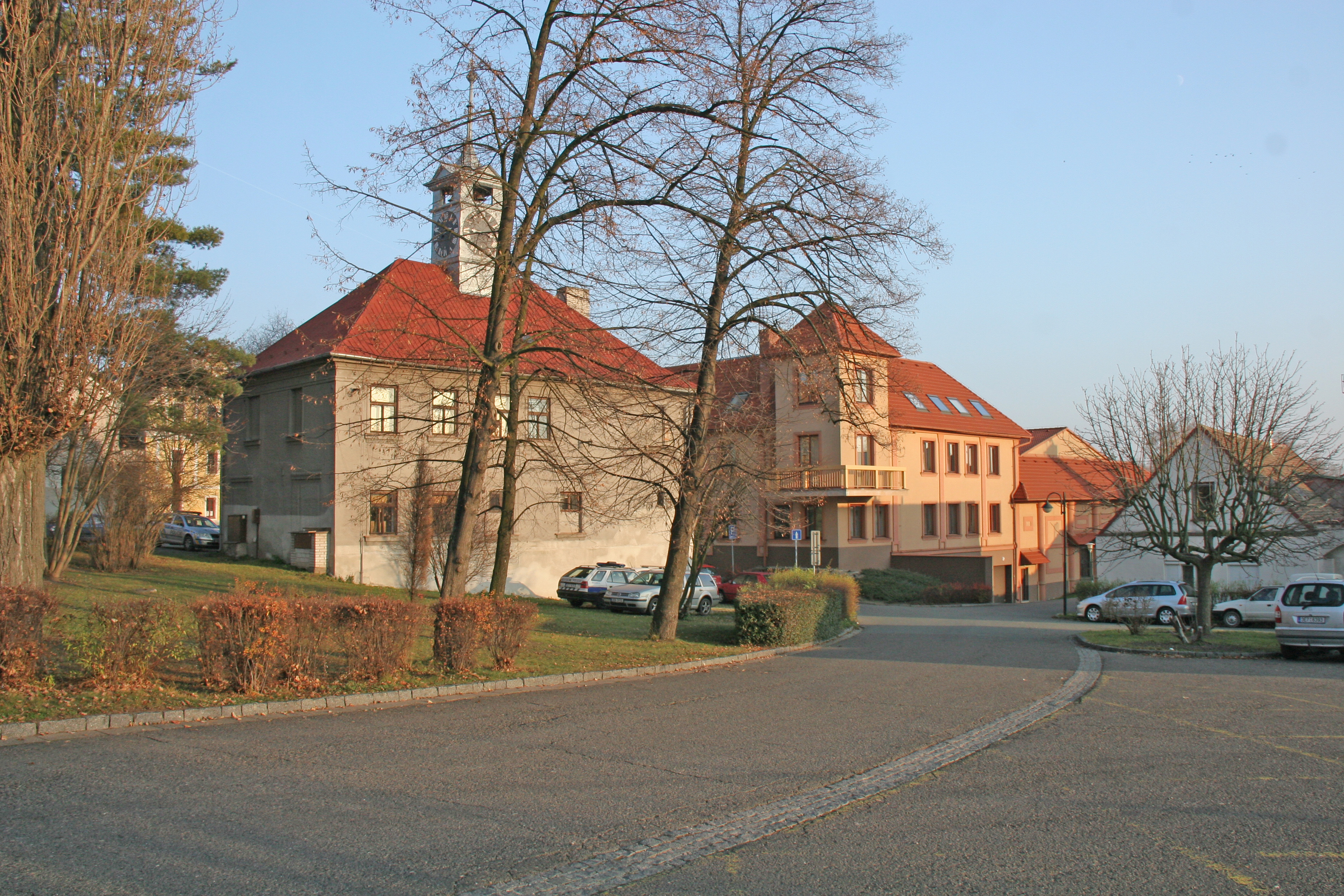
- The square Husovo náměstí

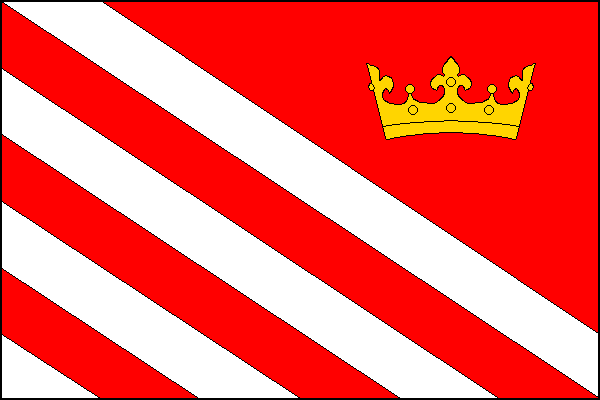
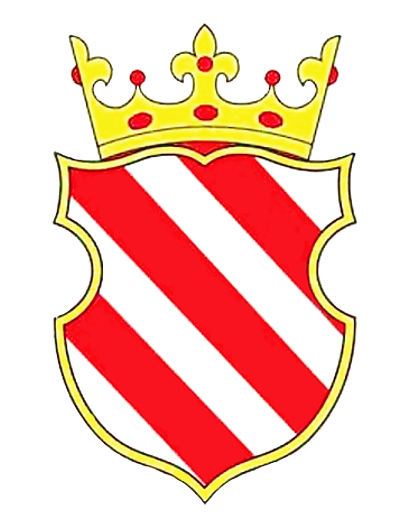
- Flag Coat of arms

- Location in the Czech Republic
- Coordinates: 50°4′0″N 15°51′10″E
- Country: Czech Republic
- Region: Pardubice
- District: Pardubice
- First mentioned: 1227

Government
  - Mayor: Martin Staněk

Area
  - Total: 22.15 km^{2} (8.55 sq mi)
- Elevation: 225 m (738 ft)

Population (2026-01-01)
  - Total: 4,393
  - Density: 198.3/km^{2} (513.7/sq mi)
- Time zone: UTC+1 (CET)
  - Summer (DST): UTC+2 (CEST)
- Postal code: 533 04
- Website: www.sezemice.cz

Sezemice (Czech pronunciation: [ˈsɛzɛmɪtsɛ]; German: Sezemitz, Sesemitz) is a town in Pardubice District in the Pardubice Region of the Czech Republic. It has about 4,400 inhabitants. The town is located on the Loučná River in the East Elbe Table.

Sezemice was founded in the first half of the 13th century at the latest and became a town in 1834. The most important monument in the town is the Church of the Holy Trinity.

== Administrative division ==
Sezemice consists of seven municipal parts (in brackets population according to the 2021 census):

- Sezemice (2,846)
- Dražkov (111)
- Kladina (193)
- Lukovna (64)
- Počaply (299)
- Velké Koloděje (190)
- Veská (384)

== Etymology ==
The name is derived from the personal name Sezema, meaning "the village of Sezema's people".

== Geography ==
Sezemice is located about 5 kilometres (3 mi) northeast of Pardubice. It lies in a flat landscape in the East Elbe Table. The Loučná River flows through the town. The fishpond Labská is situated north of the town.

== History ==
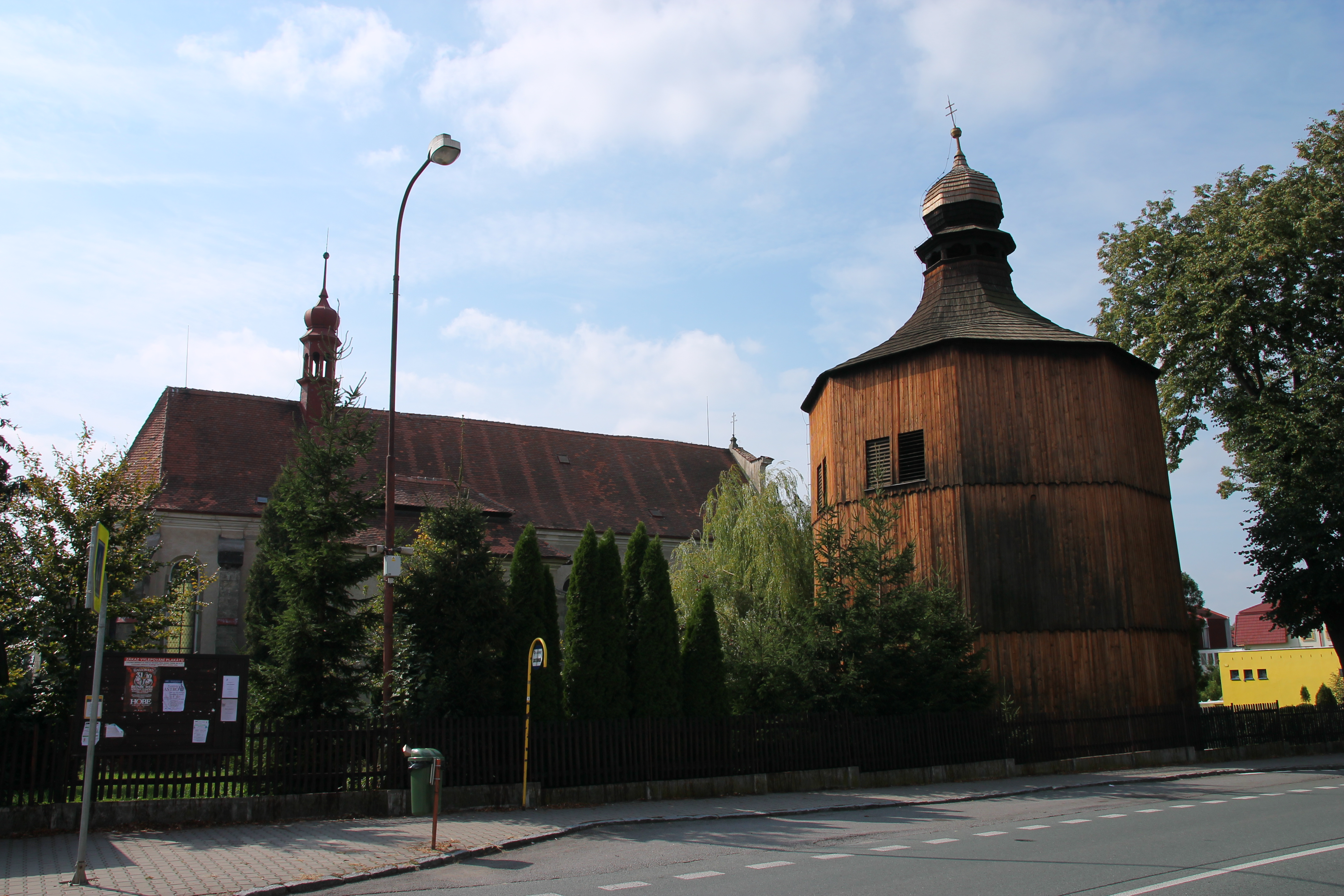
Wooden bell tower

The first written mention of Sezemice is from 1227, when Kojata IV Hrabišic bequeathed the village to the Cistercian Sedlec Abbey. In the 13th century, a Cistercian convent was founded in Sezemice, who managed the village. However, the convent was destroyed during the Hussite Wars in 1421 and Sezemice was acquired by Diviš Bořek of Miletínek. In 1436, the village was looted and burned down.

In 1488, Sezemice was bought by Jan Anděl of Ronov and was first referred to as a market town. Between 1491 and 1559, it was a property of the Pernštejn family. In 1560, it was bought by Emperor Maximilian II. As a part of the Pardubice estate, Sezemice remained a property of Austrian emperors until 1863.

During the Thirty Years' War, Sezemice was burned down by the army of General Lennart Torstensson. The market town recovered, but was again damaged by fires in 1701, 1716 and 1732. Other trials for the market town were the Seven Years' War and epidemics of plague and cholera. Despite all the difficulties, Sezemice slowly grew, and was promoted to a town in 1834.

== Demographics ==
Historical population

Year	Pop.	±%
1869	2,771	—
1880	3,022	+9.1%
1890	3,255	+7.7%
1900	3,419	+5.0%
1910	3,816	+11.6%

Year	Pop.	±%
1921	3,605	−5.5%
1930	3,545	−1.7%
1950	3,088	−12.9%
1961	3,189	+3.3%
1970	2,940	−7.8%

Year	Pop.	±%
1980	2,863	−2.6%
1991	2,742	−4.2%
2001	3,007	+9.7%
2011	3,631	+20.8%
2021	4,087	+12.6%

Source: Censuses

== Transport ==
The D35 motorway briefly passes through the eastern part of the municipal territory.

== Sights ==
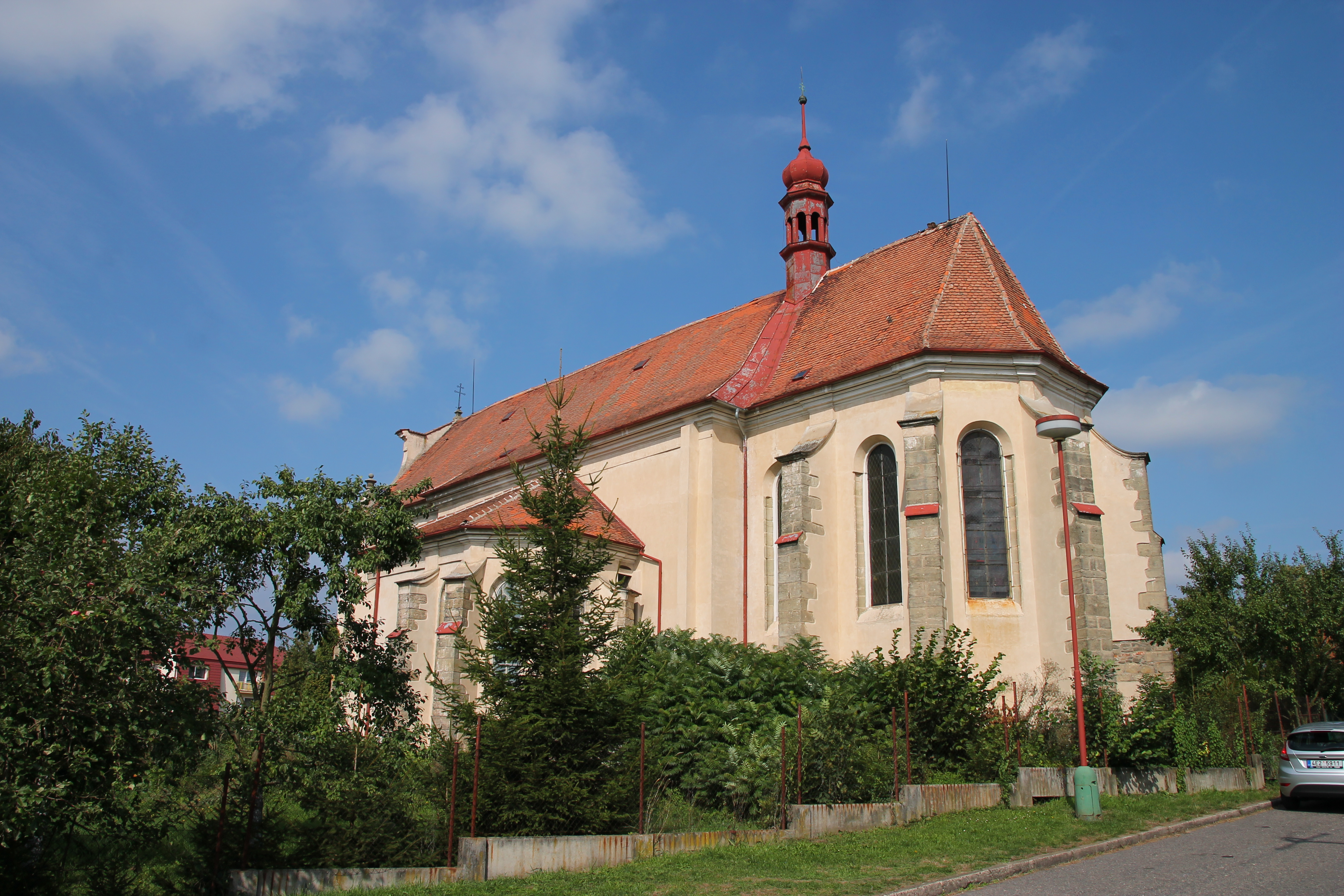
Church of the Holy Trinity

The main landmark of Sezemice is the Church of the Holy Trinity. It is a large early Gothic church, which was built in 1270–1280 as a monastery church for the Cistercian convent. The Chapel of Saint Anne was added to the church in 1380–1390. In the 18th century, Baroque modifications were made. The valuable frescoes painted by Josef Kramolín dates from 1784.

Next to the church is a separate Baroque octagonal wooden bell tower. The bell tower is equipped with a bell from the 16th century.

== Notable people ==
- Rudolf Havelka (1927–2007), speedway rider

== Twin towns – sister cities ==
Sezemice is twinned with:

- Neuville-Saint-Vaast, France
