= Slepotice =

Municipality in the Czech Republic

- Municipality
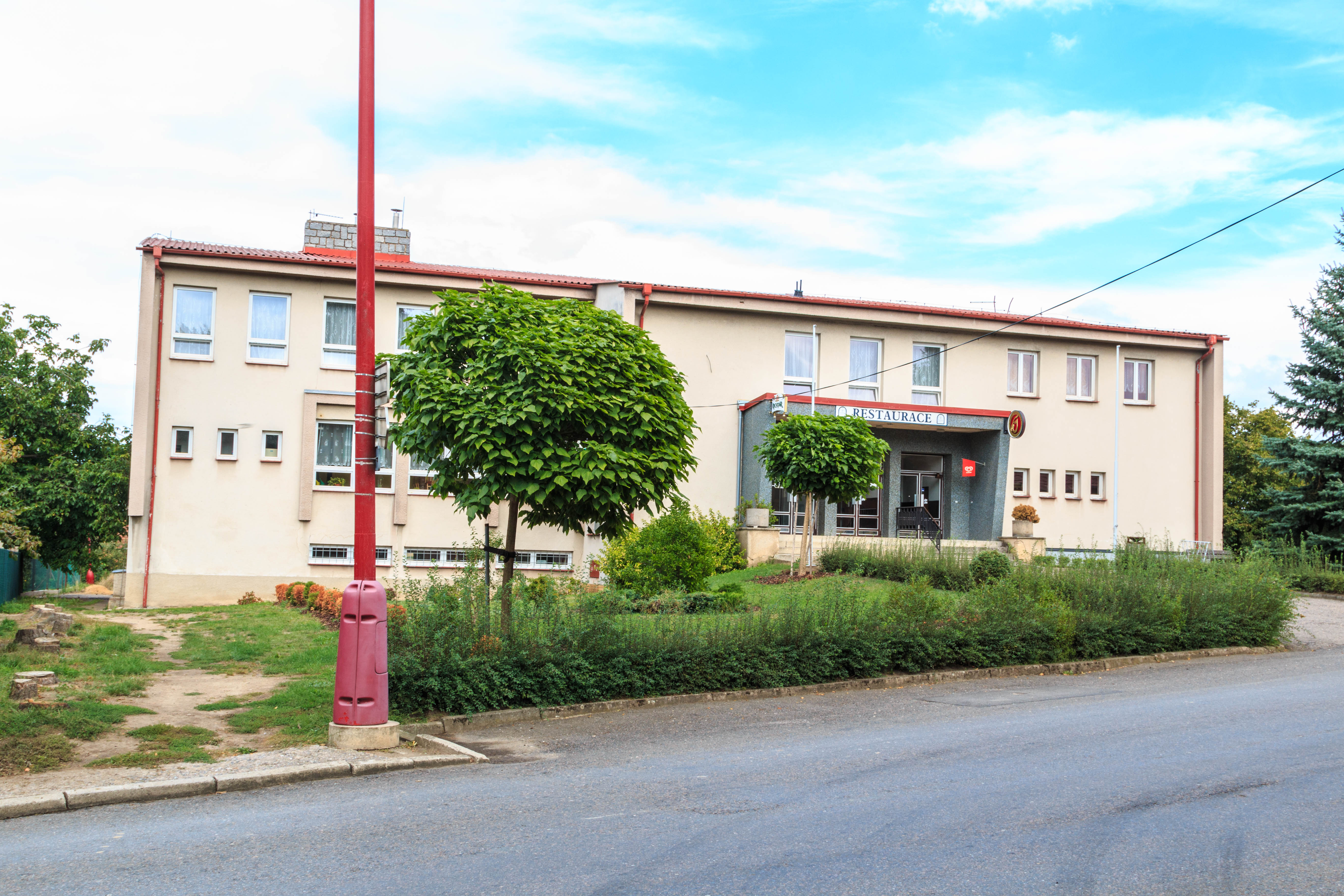
- Municipal office

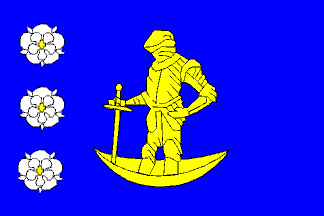
- Flag Coat of arms

- Location in the Czech Republic
- Coordinates: 49°59′32″N 15°57′41″E
- Country: Czech Republic
- Region: Pardubice
- District: Pardubice
- First mentioned: 1318

Area
  - Total: 7.45 km^{2} (2.88 sq mi)
- Elevation: 248 m (814 ft)

Population (2026-01-01)
  - Total: 466
  - Density: 62.6/km^{2} (162/sq mi)
- Time zone: UTC+1 (CET)
  - Summer (DST): UTC+2 (CEST)
- Postal code: 530 02
- Website: www.slepotice.cz

Slepotice is a municipality and village in Pardubice District in the Pardubice Region of the Czech Republic. It has about 500 inhabitants.

== Administrative division ==
Slepotice consists of four municipal parts (in brackets population according to the 2021 census):

- Slepotice (331)
- Bělešovice (27)
- Lipec (40)
- Nové Holešovice (26)

== Demographics ==
Historical population
| Year | Pop. | ±% |
|---|---|---|
| 1869 | 726 | — |
| 1880 | 723 | −0.4% |
| 1890 | 729 | +0.8% |
| 1900 | 707 | −3.0% |
| 1910 | 732 | +3.5% |
| 1921 | 716 | −2.2% |
| 1930 | 672 | −6.1% |
| 1950 | 523 | −22.2% |
| 1961 | 537 | +2.7% |
| 1970 | 481 | −10.4% |
| 1980 | 466 | −3.1% |
| 1991 | 410 | −12.0% |
| 2001 | 427 | +4.1% |
| 2011 | 415 | −2.8% |
| 2021 | 424 | +2.2% |
Source: Censuses
