= Slatina (Ústí nad Orlicí District) =

- Municipality
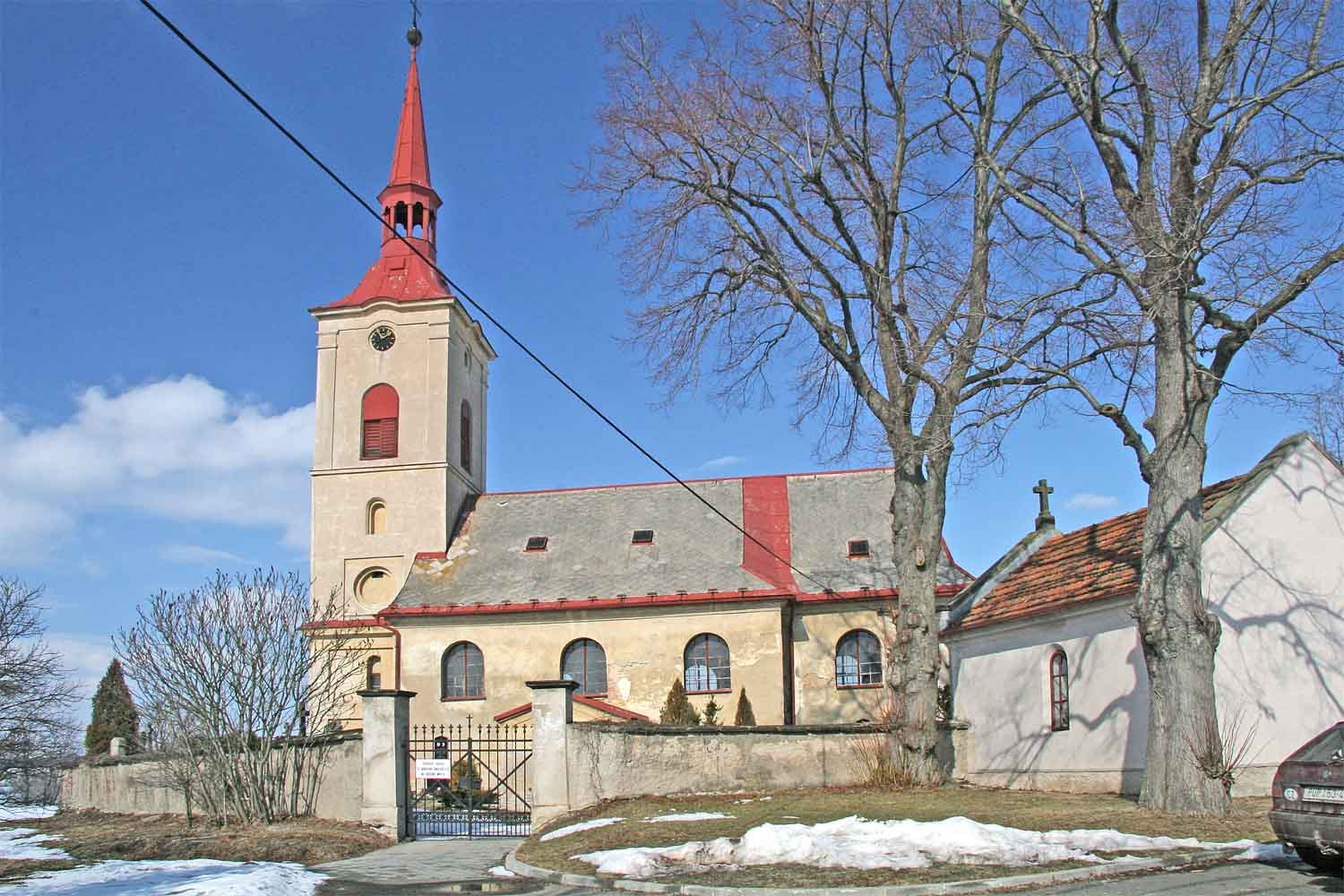
- Church of Saints Peter and Paul

- Flag Coat of arms

- Location in the Czech Republic
- Coordinates: 49°58′43″N 16°9′33″E
- Country: Czech Republic
- Region: Pardubice
- District: Ústí nad Orlicí
- First mentioned: 1363

Area
  - Total: 4.29 km^{2} (1.66 sq mi)
- Elevation: 260 m (850 ft)

Population (2026-01-01)
  - Total: 463
  - Density: 108/km^{2} (280/sq mi)
- Time zone: UTC+1 (CET)
  - Summer (DST): UTC+2 (CEST)
- Postal code: 566 01
- Website: www.ou-slatina.cz

Slatina is a municipality and village in Ústí nad Orlicí District in the Pardubice Region of the Czech Republic. It has about 500 inhabitants.

Slatina lies approximately 17 kilometres (11 mi) west of Ústí nad Orlicí, 29 km (18 mi) east of Pardubice, and 126 km (78 mi) east of Prague.

== Demographics ==
Historical population
Year	Pop.	±%
1869	403	—
1880	407	+1.0%
1890	406	−0.2%
1900	391	−3.7%
1910	385	−1.5%
1921	414	+7.5%
1930	410	−1.0%
1950	348	−15.1%
1961	344	−1.1%
1970	343	−0.3%
1980	323	−5.8%
1991	386	+19.5%
2001	402	+4.1%
2011	387	−3.7%
2021	430	+11.1%
Source: Censuses
