= Kunětice =

- Municipality
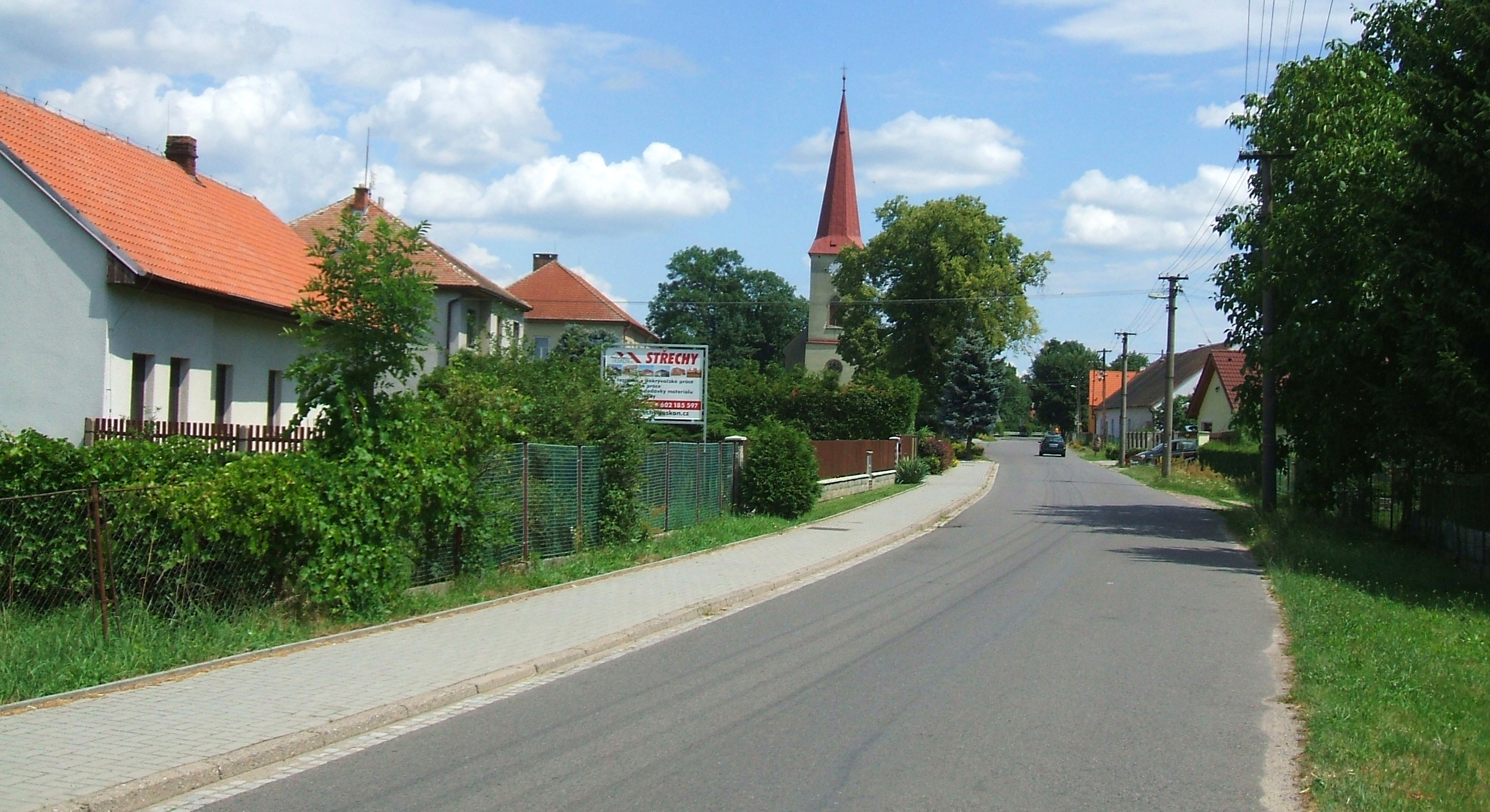
- Main street

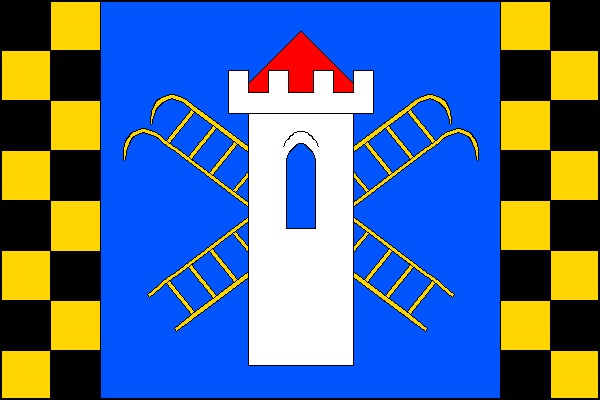
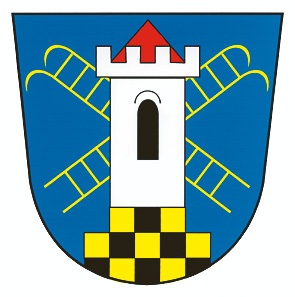
- Flag Coat of arms

- Location in the Czech Republic
- Coordinates: 50°4′14″N 15°49′37″E
- Country: Czech Republic
- Region: Pardubice
- District: Pardubice
- First mentioned: 1353

Area
  - Total: 3.95 km^{2} (1.53 sq mi)
- Elevation: 221 m (725 ft)

Population (2026-01-01)
  - Total: 429
  - Density: 109/km^{2} (281/sq mi)
- Time zone: UTC+1 (CET)
  - Summer (DST): UTC+2 (CEST)
- Postal code: 533 04
- Website: www.obeckunetice.cz

Kunětice is a municipality and village in Pardubice District in the Pardubice Region of the Czech Republic. It has about 400 inhabitants.

== Geography ==
Kunětice is located about 5 kilometres (3 mi) northeast of Pardubice. It lies in a flat landscape in the East Elbe Table below the hill Kunětická hora, which lies outside the municipality. The municipality is situated on the right bank of the Elbe River.

== Demographics ==
Historical population
Year	Pop.	±%
1869	388	—
1880	406	+4.6%
1890	419	+3.2%
1900	361	−13.8%
1910	293	−18.8%
1921	299	+2.0%
1930	325	+8.7%
1950	274	−15.7%
1961	315	+15.0%
1970	266	−15.6%
1980	237	−10.9%
1991	224	−5.5%
2001	254	+13.4%
2011	270	+6.3%
2021	345	+27.8%
Source: Censuses
