= Trusnov =

- Municipality
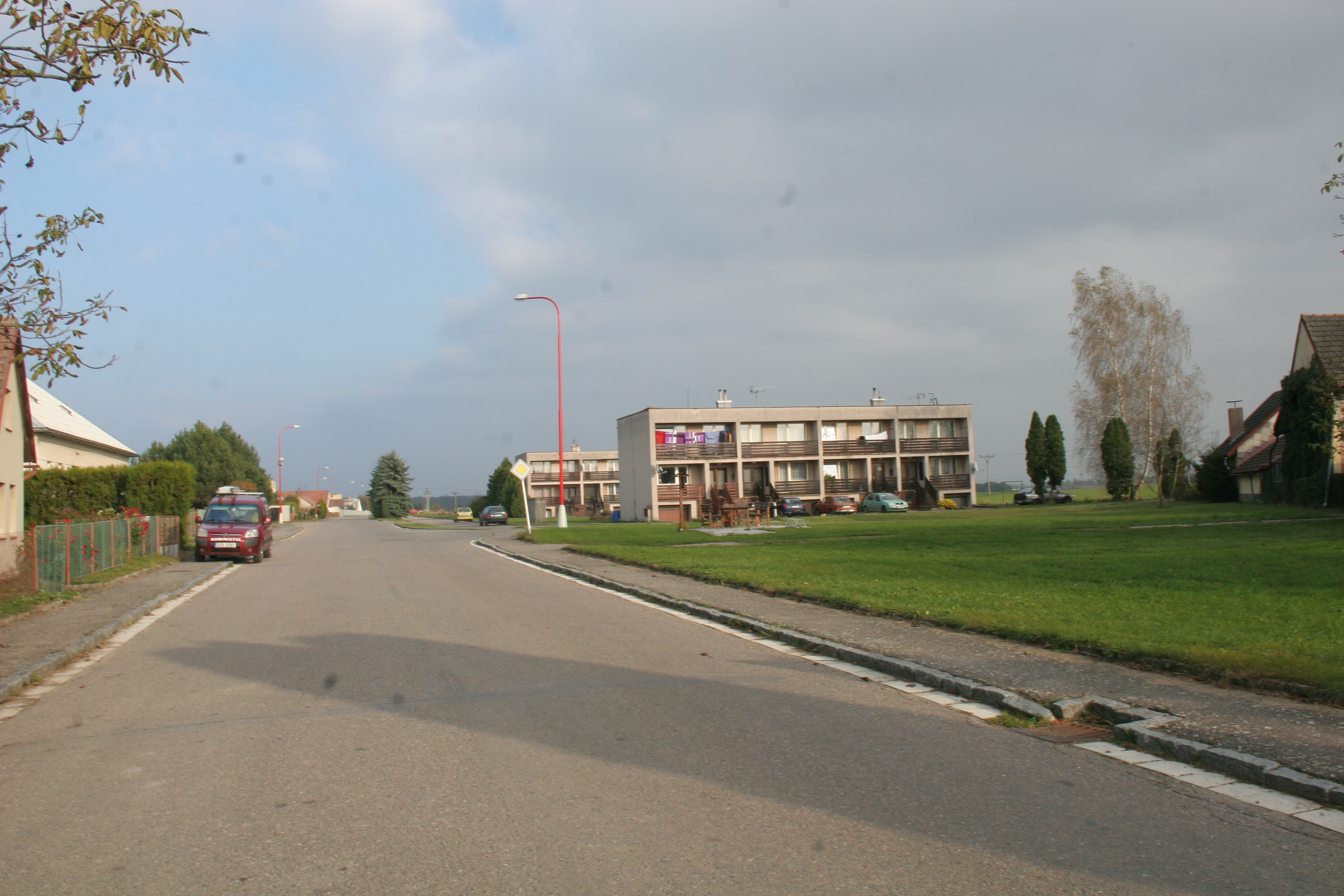
- Main road

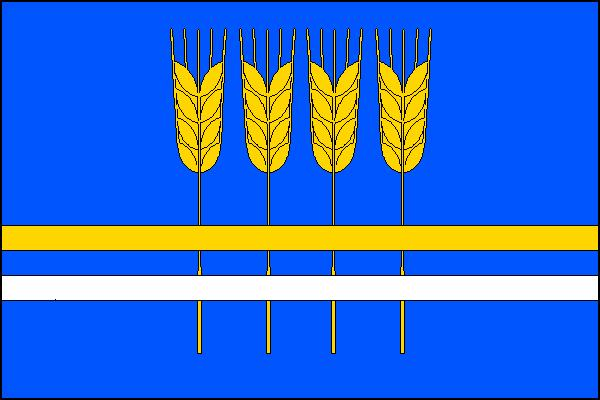
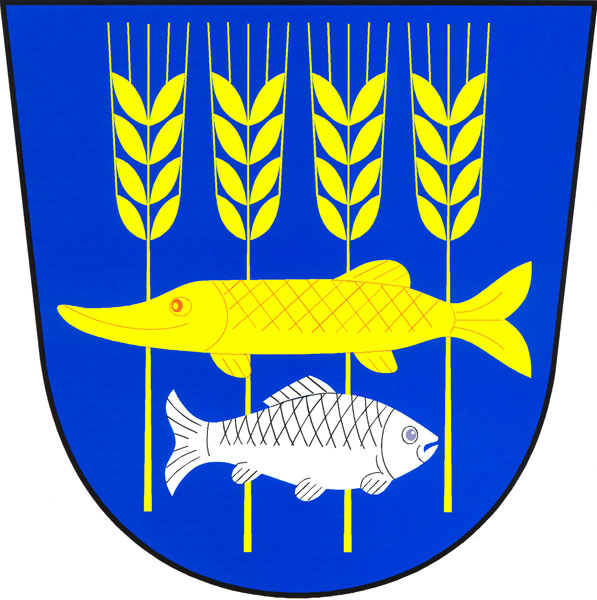
- Flag Coat of arms

- Location in the Czech Republic
- Coordinates: 50°0′0″N 16°2′39″E
- Country: Czech Republic
- Region: Pardubice
- District: Pardubice
- First mentioned: 1407

Area
  - Total: 10.64 km^{2} (4.11 sq mi)
- Elevation: 263 m (863 ft)

Population (2026-01-01)
  - Total: 212
  - Density: 19.9/km^{2} (51.6/sq mi)
- Time zone: UTC+1 (CET)
  - Summer (DST): UTC+2 (CEST)
- Postal code: 534 01
- Website: www.obectrusnov.cz

Trusnov is a municipality and village in Pardubice District in the Pardubice Region of the Czech Republic. It has about 200 inhabitants.

== Administrative division ==
Trusnov consists of four municipal parts (in brackets population according to the 2021 census):

- Trusnov (126)
- Franclina (23)
- Opočno (58)
- Žíka (15)

== Demographics ==
Historical population
Year	Pop.	±%
1869	674	—
1880	671	−0.4%
1890	660	−1.6%
1900	647	−2.0%
1910	629	−2.8%
1921	609	−3.2%
1930	573	−5.9%
1950	445	−22.3%
1961	407	−8.5%
1970	364	−10.6%
1980	310	−14.8%
1991	246	−20.6%
2001	222	−9.8%
2011	232	+4.5%
2021	222	−4.3%
Source: Censuses
