= Tržek =

- Municipality
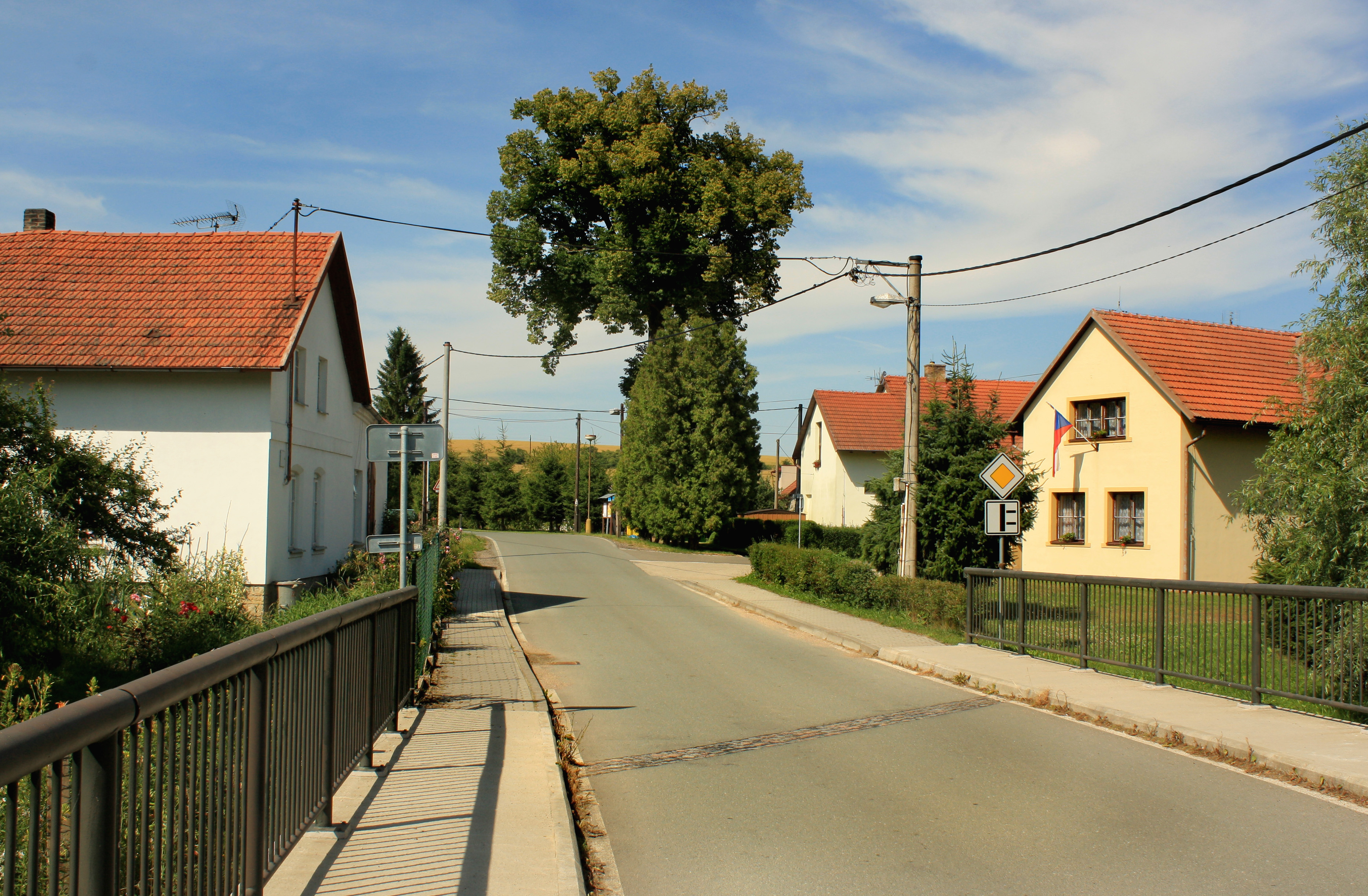
- Bridge over the Loučná River

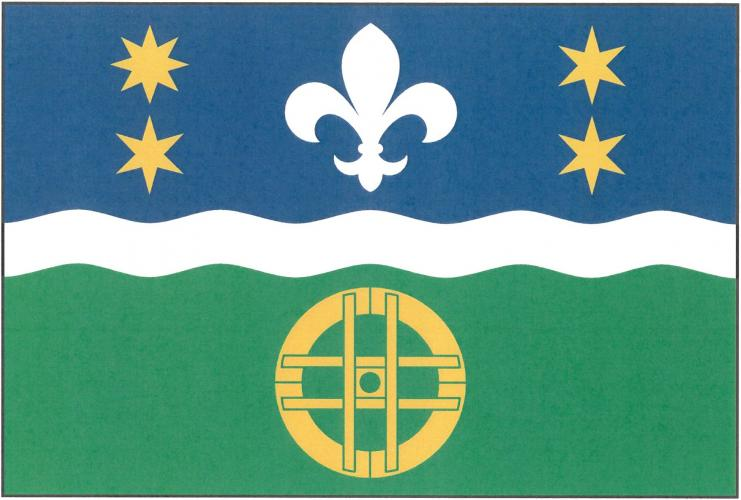
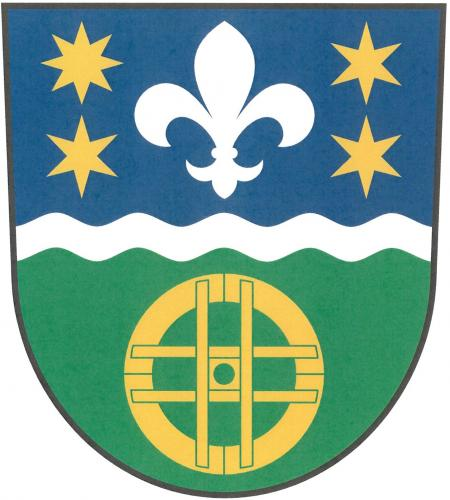
- Flag Coat of arms

- Location in the Czech Republic
- Coordinates: 49°53′11″N 16°15′36″E
- Country: Czech Republic
- Region: Pardubice
- District: Svitavy
- First mentioned: 1145

Area
  - Total: 1.71 km^{2} (0.66 sq mi)
- Elevation: 306 m (1,004 ft)

Population (2026-01-01)
  - Total: 160
  - Density: 94/km^{2} (240/sq mi)
- Time zone: UTC+1 (CET)
  - Summer (DST): UTC+2 (CEST)
- Postal code: 570 01
- Website: www.trzek.cz

Tržek is a municipality and village in Svitavy District in the Pardubice Region of the Czech Republic. It has about 200 inhabitants.

== Demographics ==
Historical population
Year	Pop.	±%
1869	224	—
1880	214	−4.5%
1890	214	+0.0%
1900	184	−14.0%
1910	221	+20.1%
1921	226	+2.3%
1930	229	+1.3%
1950	181	−21.0%
1961	215	+18.8%
1970	196	−8.8%
1980	181	−7.7%
1991	159	−12.2%
2001	166	+4.4%
2011	164	−1.2%
2021	157	−4.3%
Source: Censuses
