= Radhošť (Ústí nad Orlicí District) =

- Municipality
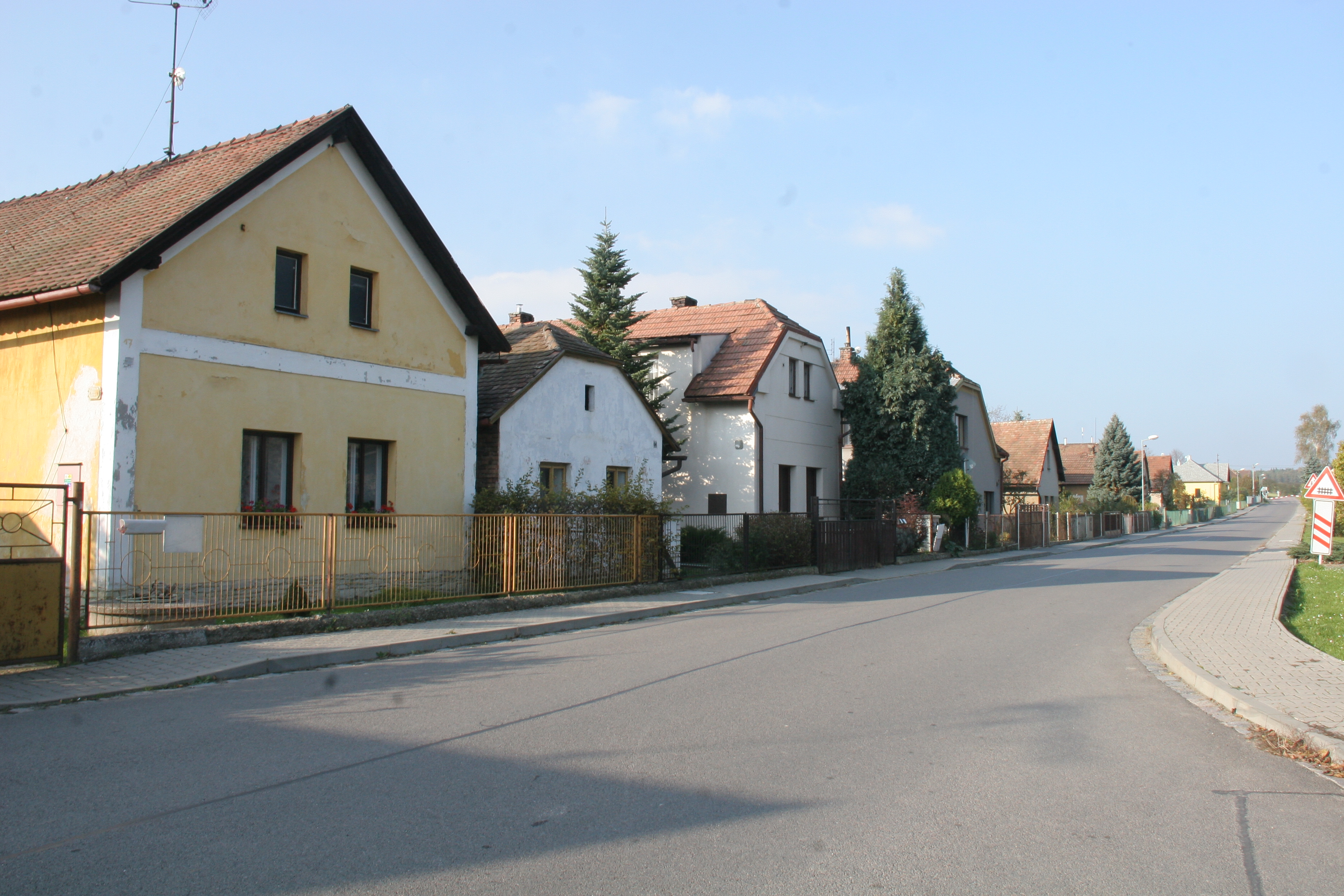
- Main street

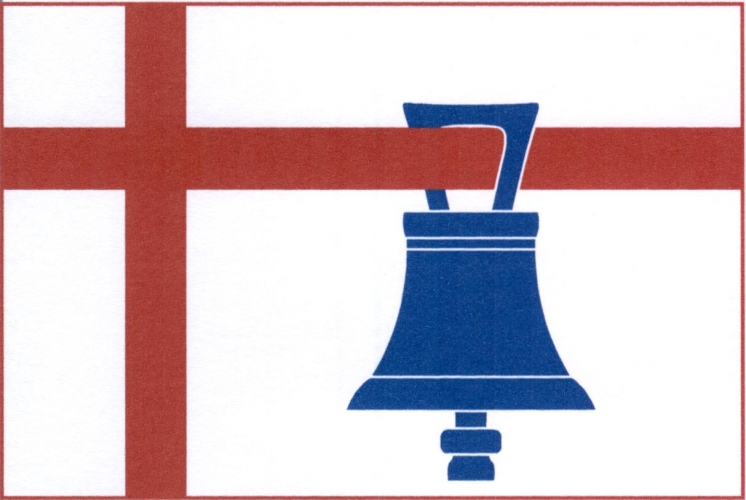
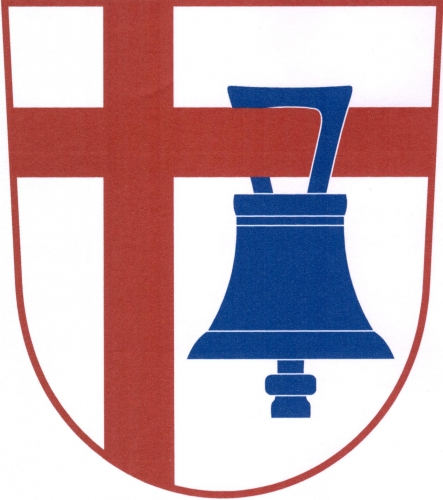
- Flag Coat of arms

- Location in the Czech Republic
- Coordinates: 49°59′15″N 16°4′34″E
- Country: Czech Republic
- Region: Pardubice
- District: Ústí nad Orlicí
- First mentioned: 1226

Area
  - Total: 4.80 km^{2} (1.85 sq mi)
- Elevation: 255 m (837 ft)

Population (2026-01-01)
  - Total: 173
  - Density: 36.0/km^{2} (93.3/sq mi)
- Time zone: UTC+1 (CET)
  - Summer (DST): UTC+2 (CEST)
- Postal code: 534 01
- Website: www.obec-radhost.cz

Radhošť (German: Radhoscht) is a municipality and village in Ústí nad Orlicí District in the Pardubice Region of the Czech Republic. It has about 200 inhabitants.

== Administrative division ==
Radhošť consists of two municipal parts (in brackets population according to the 2021 census):

- Radhošť (96)
- Sedlíštka (61)

== Demographics ==
Historical population
Year	Pop.	±%
1869	330	—
1880	356	+7.9%
1890	313	−12.1%
1900	276	−11.8%
1910	363	+31.5%
1921	391	+7.7%
1930	349	−10.7%
1950	242	−30.7%
1961	289	+19.4%
1970	266	−8.0%
1980	230	−13.5%
1991	176	−23.5%
2001	160	−9.1%
2011	167	+4.4%
2021	157	−6.0%
Source: Censuses
