= Svitavy Uplands =

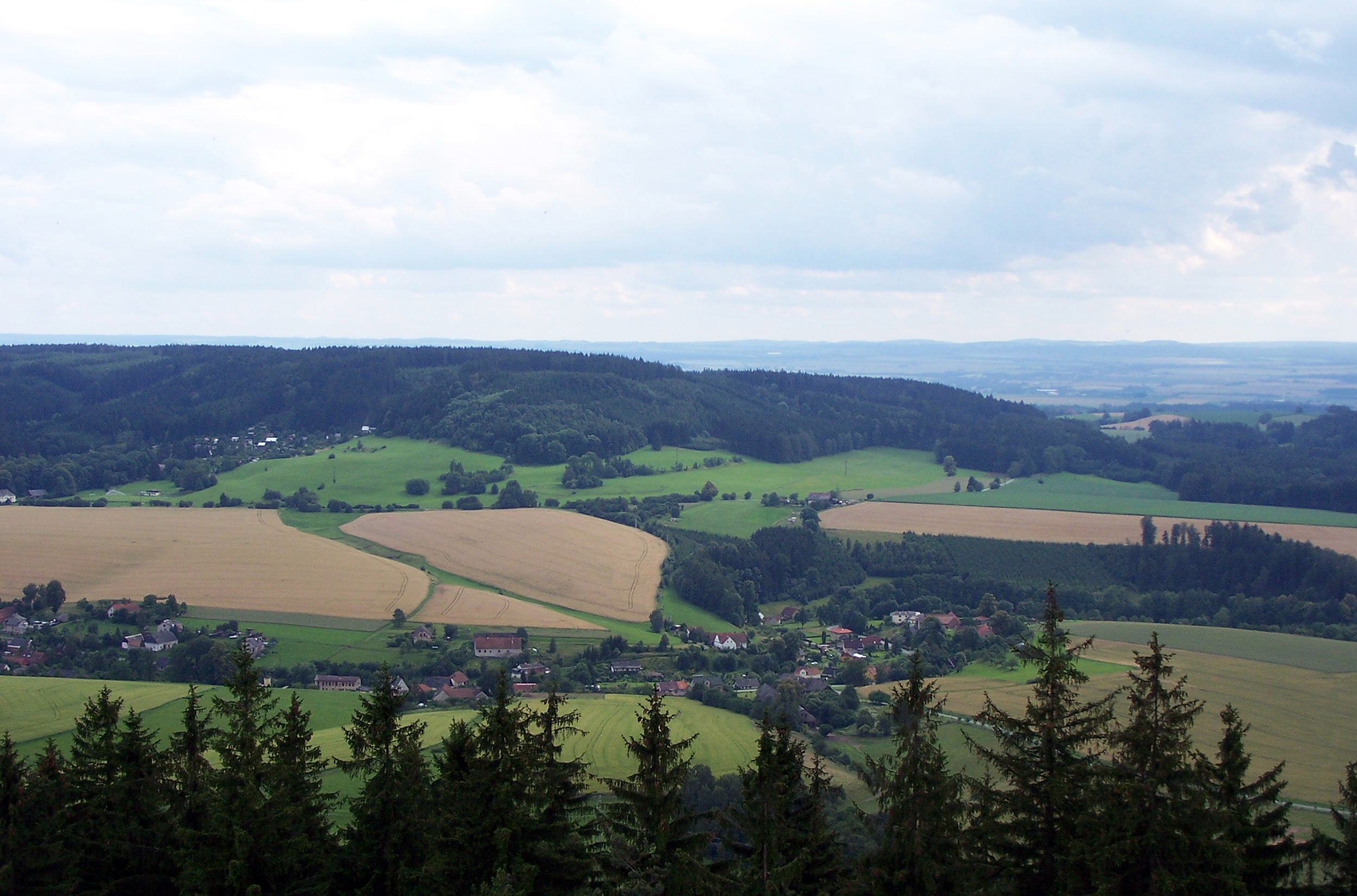
- View of Řetůvka

Highest point
- Peak: Baldský vrch
- Elevation: 692 m (2,270 ft)

Dimensions
- Length: 97 km (60 mi)
- Area: 1,692 km^{2} (653 mi^{2})

Geography
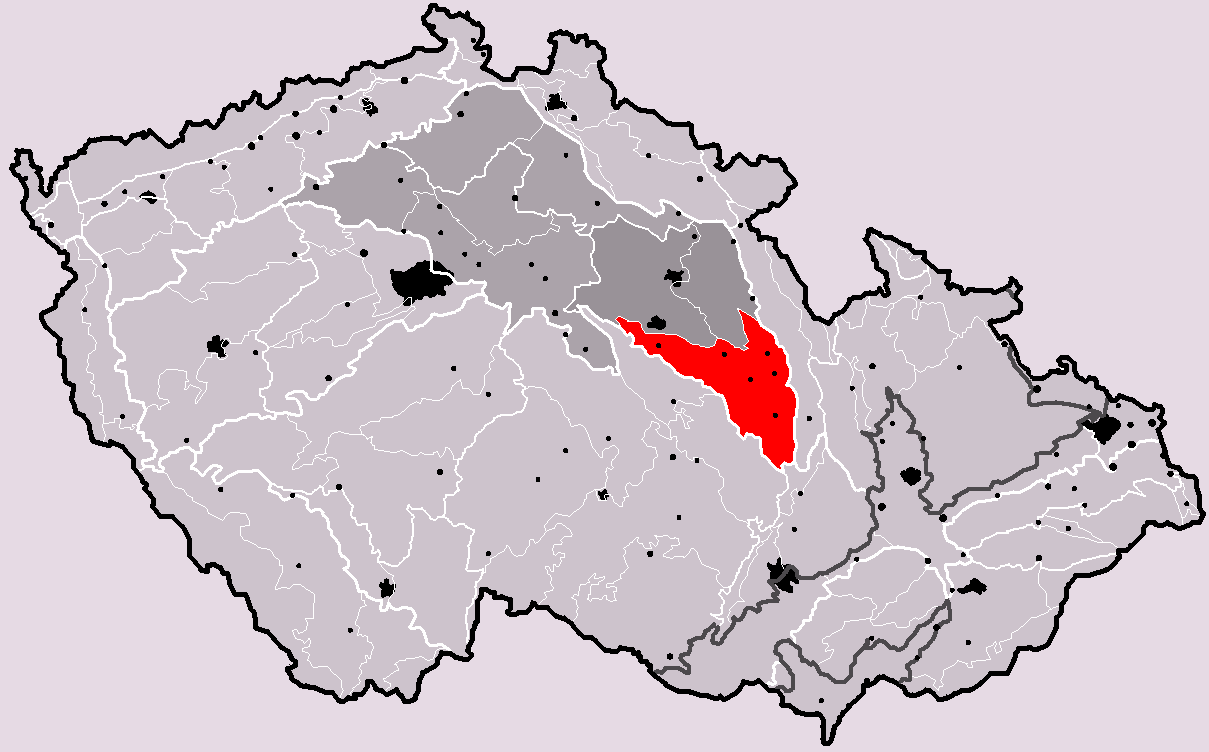
- Svitavy Uplands in the geomorphological system of the Czech Republic
- Country: Czech Republic
- Region: Pardubice
- Range coordinates: 49°53′N 16°19′E
- Parent range: East Bohemian Table

Geology
- Rock type(s): Marlite, spongilite, claystone, sediments

The Svitavy Uplands or Svitavy Hills (Czech: Svitavská pahorkatina) are uplands and a geomorphological mesoregion of the Czech Republic. It is located in the Pardubice Region and it belongs to the largest mesoregions in the country.

== Geomorphology ==
The Svitavy Uplands is a mesoregion of the East Bohemian Table within the Bohemian Massif. It is a rugged hilly area with highlands in the eastern part. It has a relatively uniform relief with synclines, low ridges, cuestas, valleys and furrows. The relief is complemented by Pleistocene river terraces of the Chrudimka River. The uplands are further subdivided into the microregions of Česká Třebová Highlands, Loučná Table and Chrudim Table.

There are a lot of medium-high hills. The highest peaks are located in the southern part of the territory. The highest peaks of the Svitavy Uplands are:

- Baldský vrch, 692 m (2,270 ft)
- Drašarov, 686 m (2,251 ft)
- Rohozná, 685 m (2,247 ft)
- Poličský vrch, 672 m (2,205 ft)
- Roh, 660 m (2,170 ft)
- Modřecký vrch, 657 m (2,156 ft)
- U Mariánského obrazu, 654 m (2,146 ft)
- Na drahách, 649 m (2,129 ft)
- Mladějovský vrch, 647 m (2,123 ft)
- Mirand, 640 m (2,100 ft)

== Geography ==
The Svitavy Uplands roughly stretches from the south to the northwest and north. The uplands have an area of 1,692 square kilometres (653 sq mi) and an average elevation of 412 metres (1,352 ft).

There are several rivers, but in general the area is poor in smaller watercourses. The main European watershed passes through the Svitavy Uplands. The river Svitava and its tributaries in the southern tip of the uplands head to the Black Sea. The northern part with the rivers Chrudimka, Loučná, Novohradka, Třebovka and Tichá Orlice is drained by the Elbe.

Suitable natural conditions contributed to the creation of many settlements in the Svitavy Uplands. The most populated towns in the territory are Chrudim, Svitavy, Česká Třebová, Ústí nad Orlicí, Vysoké Mýto, Litomyšl, Přelouč and Polička.

== Geology and pedology ==
The geologically diverse bedrock is dominated by marlite, claystones, spongilites, sandstones and marly limestones. The most widespread soils are cambisol and brown earth.

== Nature ==
The area is largely agricultural. Forest cover does not exceed 30%. There are basically no protected landscape areas in the territory, only a few small-scale protected areas. The most notable of them is the Rohová National Nature Reserve.

== Gallery ==
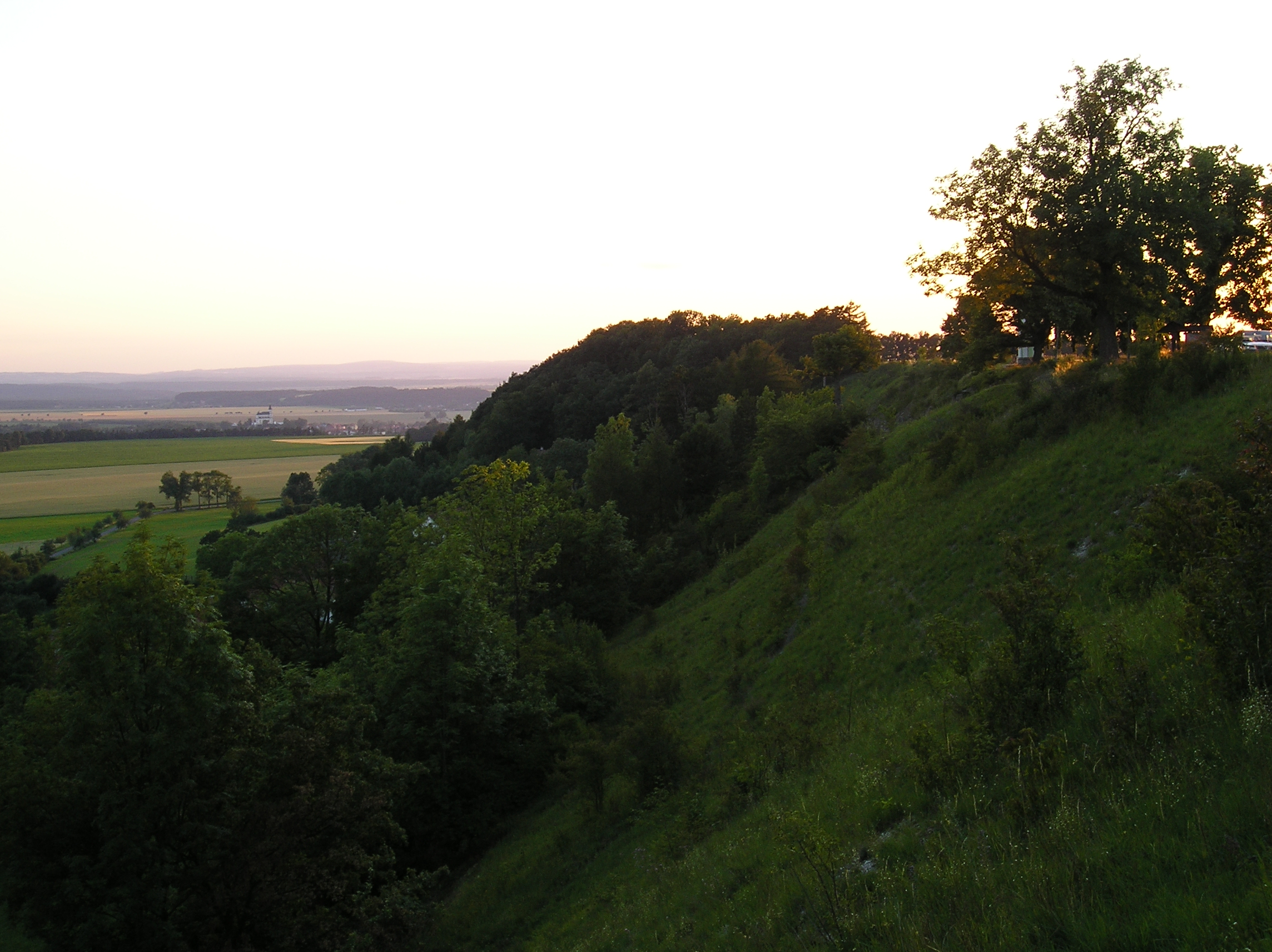
Střemošická stráň Nature Reserve

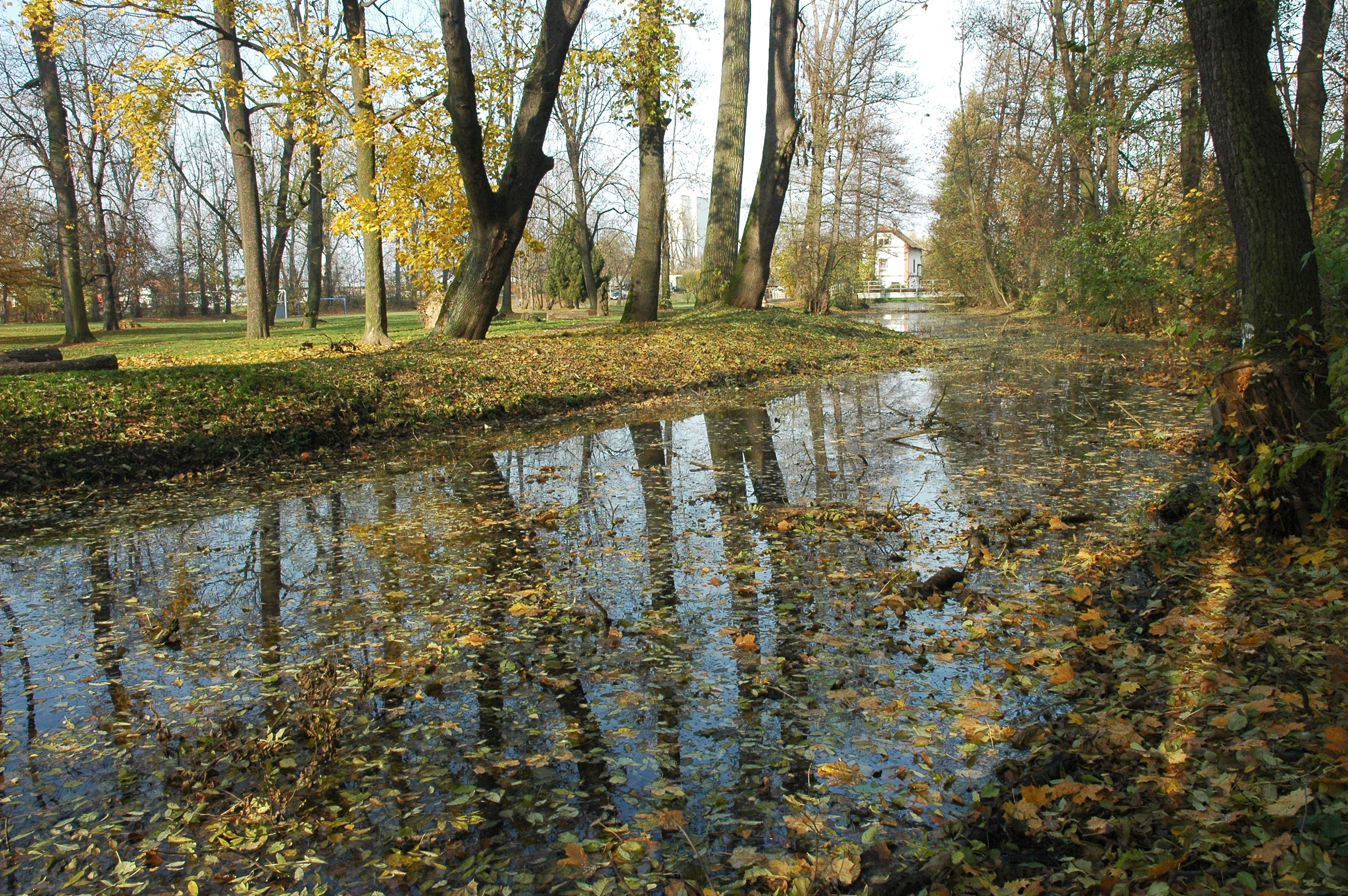
Chrudimka River in Chrudim

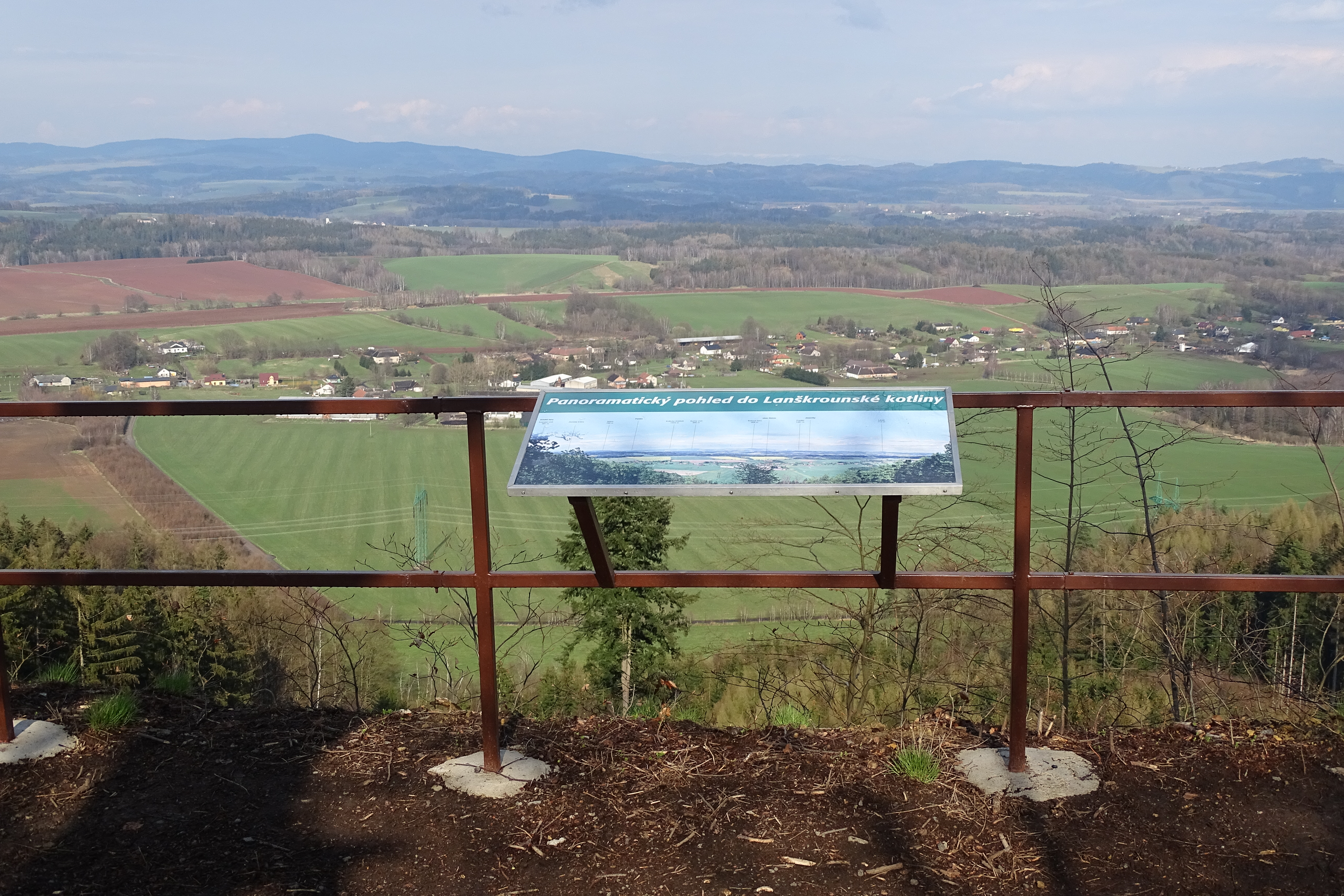
View towards Ostrov

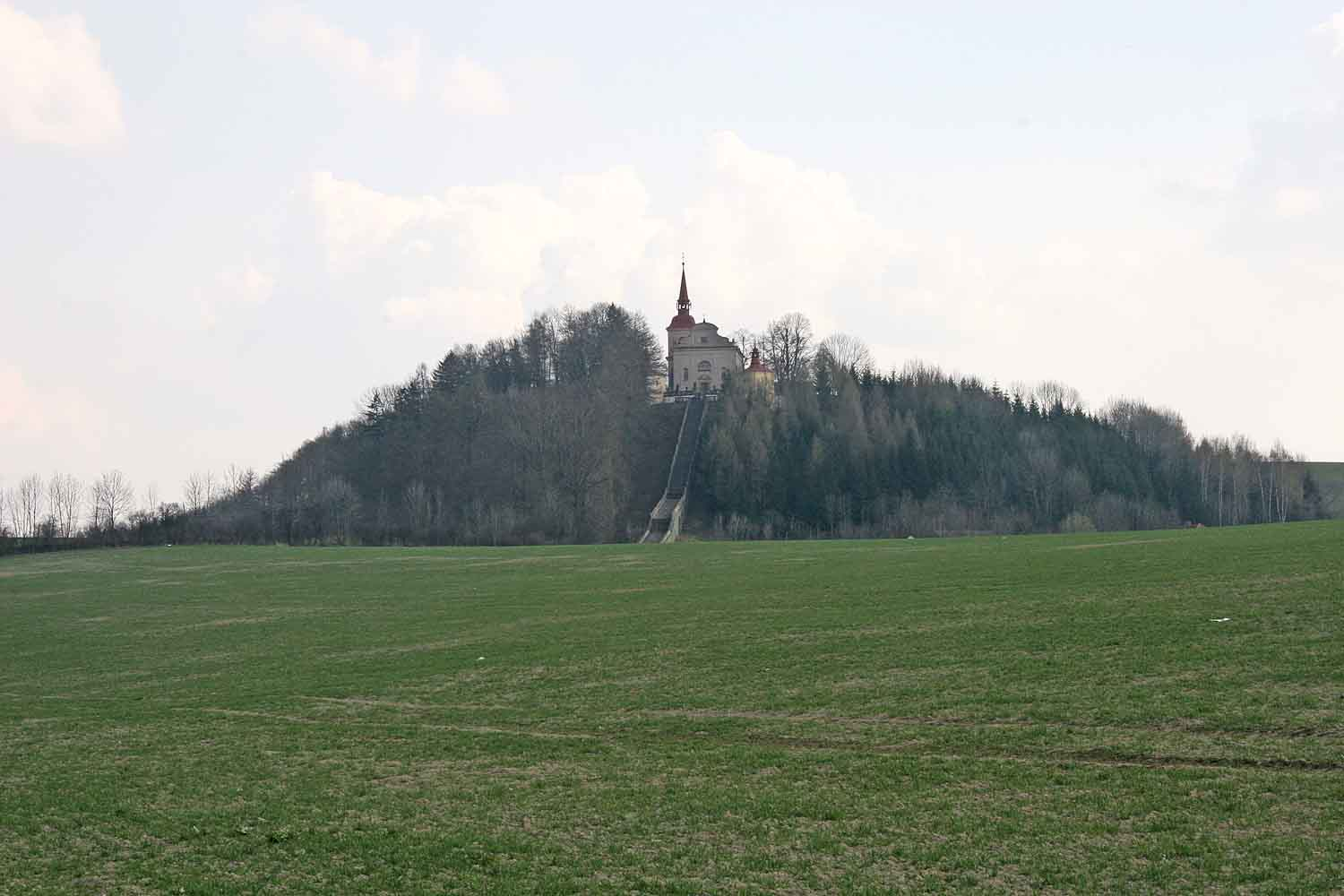
Homole, a pilgrimage site

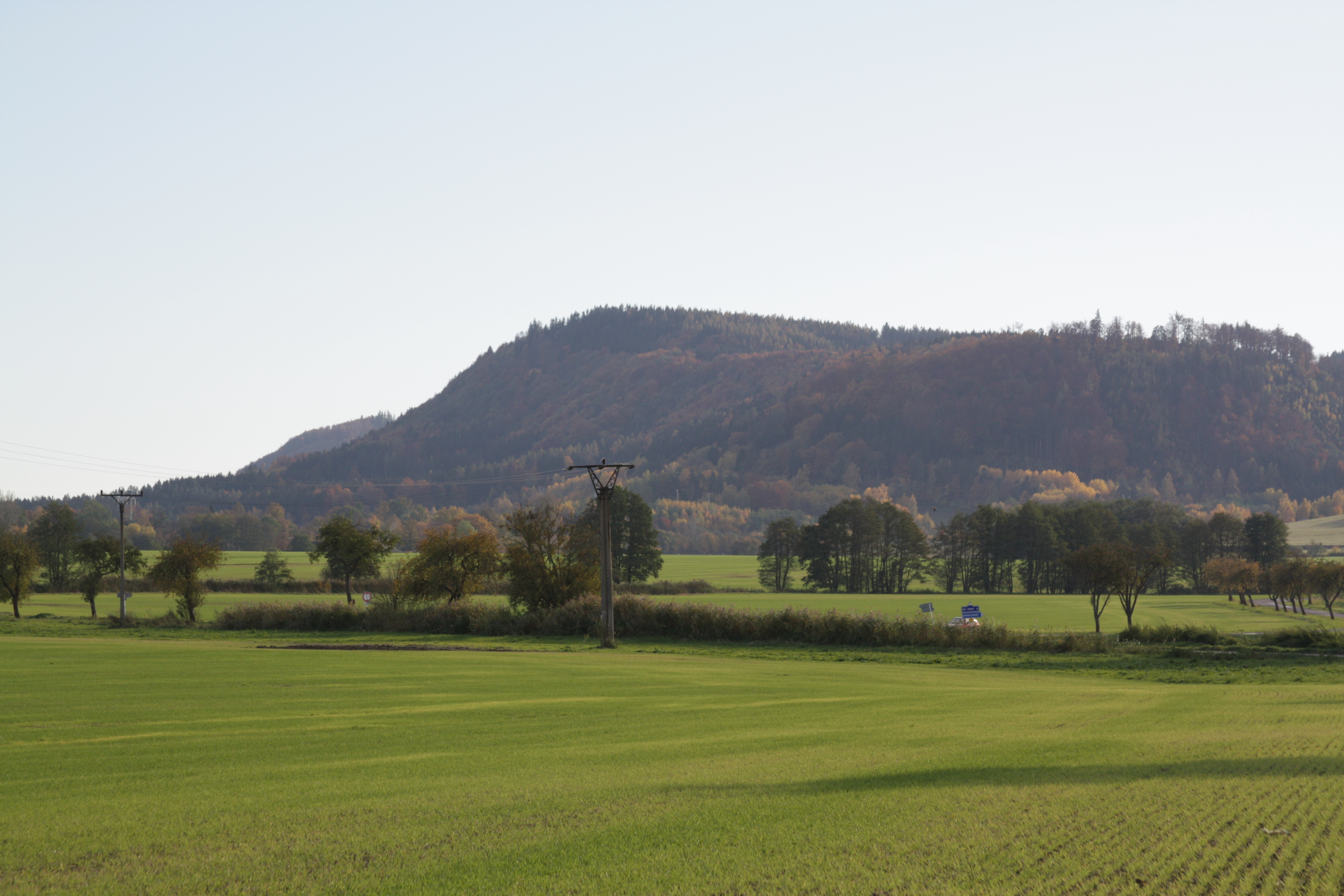
Mirand hill
