= Vinary =

Vinary may refer to places in the Czech Republic:

- Vinary (Hradec Králové District), a municipality and village in the Hradec Králové Region
- Vinary (Ústí nad Orlicí District), a municipality and village in the Pardubice Region
- Přerov XI-Vinary, a village and part of Přerov in the Olomouc Region
