= Horní Třešňovec =

- Municipality
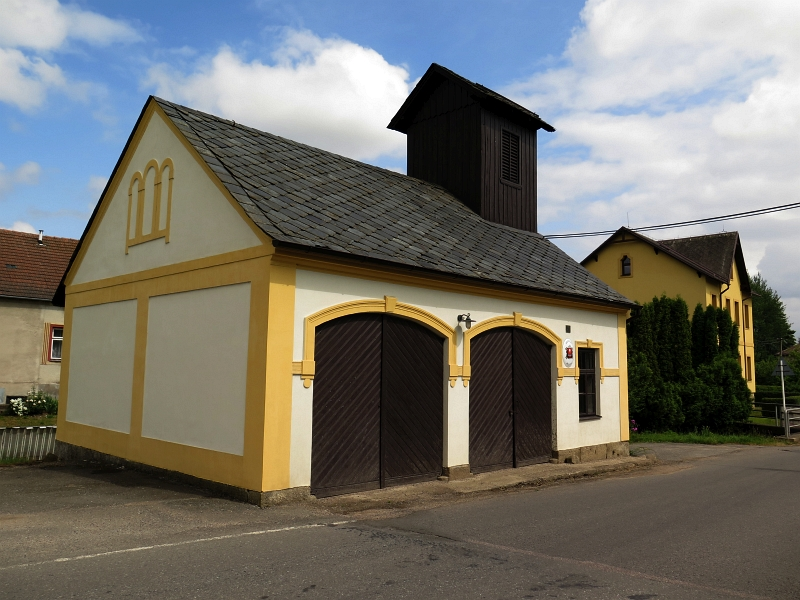
- Fire station

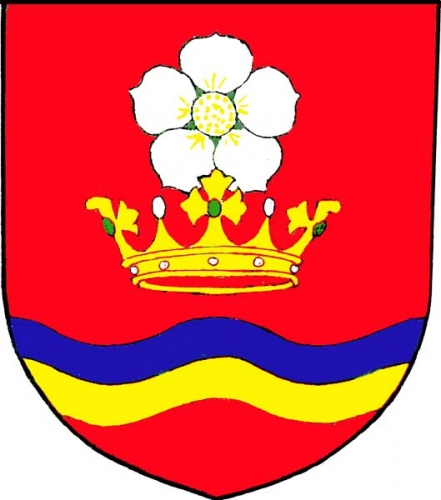
- Flag Coat of arms

- Location in the Czech Republic
- Coordinates: 49°56′21″N 16°36′9″E
- Country: Czech Republic
- Region: Pardubice
- District: Ústí nad Orlicí
- First mentioned: 1304

Area
  - Total: 9.80 km^{2} (3.78 sq mi)
- Elevation: 415 m (1,362 ft)

Population (2026-01-01)
  - Total: 645
  - Density: 65.8/km^{2} (170/sq mi)
- Time zone: UTC+1 (CET)
  - Summer (DST): UTC+2 (CEST)
- Postal code: 563 01
- Website: www.hornitresnovec.cz

Horní Třešňovec (German: Ober-Johnsdorf) is a municipality and village in Ústí nad Orlicí District in the Pardubice Region of the Czech Republic. It has about 600 inhabitants.

== Demographics ==
Historical population
Year	Pop.	±%
1869	1,048	—
1880	1,153	+10.0%
1890	1,125	−2.4%
1900	1,084	−3.6%
1910	1,063	−1.9%
1921	1,057	−0.6%
1930	985	−6.8%
1950	485	−50.8%
1961	523	+7.8%
1970	497	−5.0%
1980	522	+5.0%
1991	567	+8.6%
2001	609	+7.4%
2011	575	−5.6%
2021	611	+6.3%
Source: Censuses
