= Hnátnice =

- Municipality
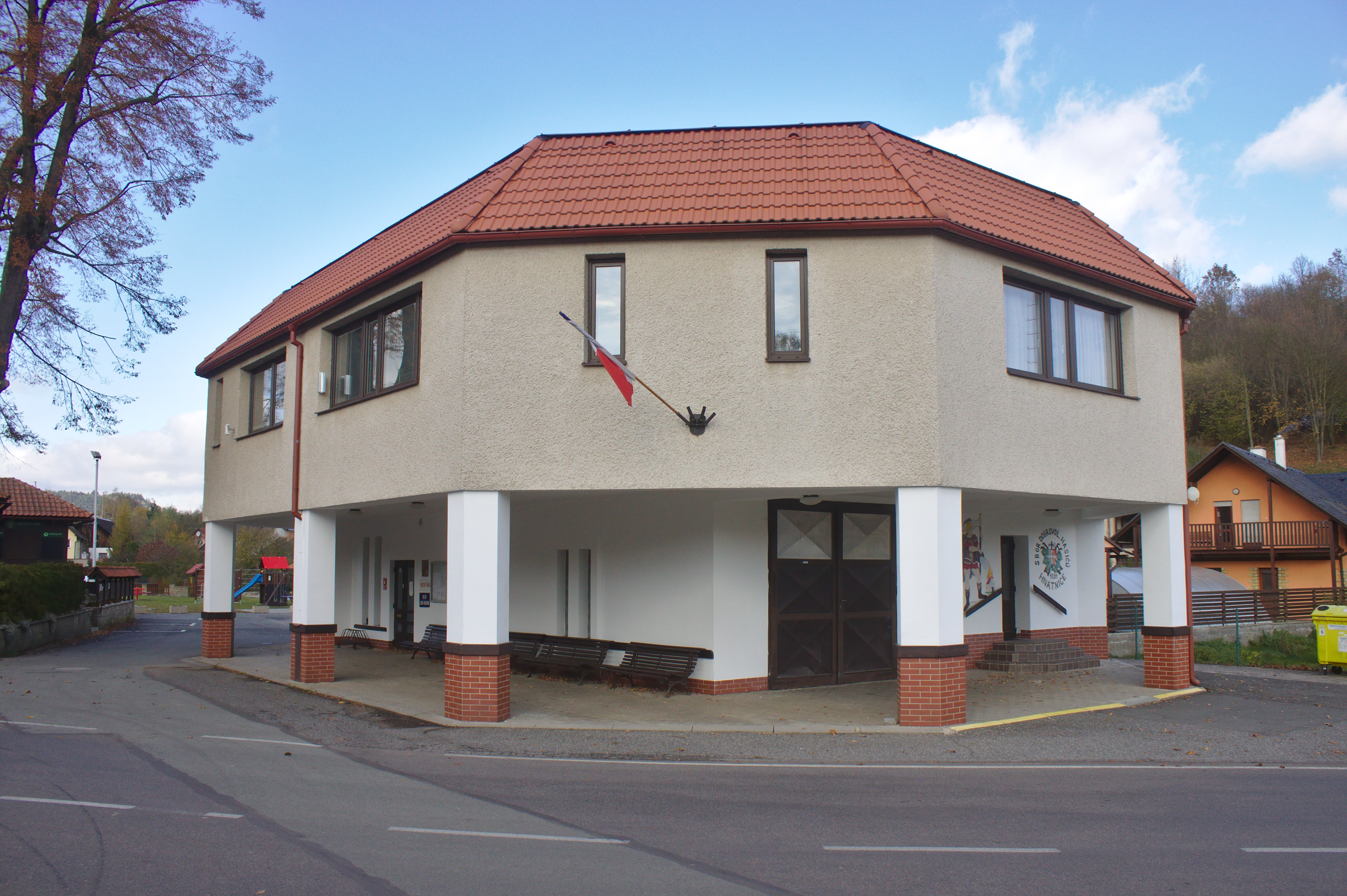
- Municipal office

- Flag Coat of arms

- Location in the Czech Republic
- Coordinates: 50°1′13″N 16°26′19″E
- Country: Czech Republic
- Region: Pardubice
- District: Ústí nad Orlicí
- First mentioned: 1364

Area
  - Total: 11.32 km^{2} (4.37 sq mi)
- Elevation: 368 m (1,207 ft)

Population (2026-01-01)
  - Total: 812
  - Density: 71.7/km^{2} (186/sq mi)
- Time zone: UTC+1 (CET)
  - Summer (DST): UTC+2 (CEST)
- Postal code: 561 01
- Website: www.hnatnice.cz

Hnátnice (German: Friedrichswald) is a municipality and village in Ústí nad Orlicí District in the Pardubice Region of the Czech Republic. It has about 800 inhabitants.

== Demographics ==
Historical population
Year	Pop.	±%
1869	1,501	—
1880	1,561	+4.0%
1890	1,624	+4.0%
1900	1,643	+1.2%
1910	1,647	+0.2%
1921	1,439	−12.6%
1930	1,483	+3.1%
1950	1,054	−28.9%
1961	1,008	−4.4%
1970	925	−8.2%
1980	933	+0.9%
1991	861	−7.7%
2001	843	−2.1%
2011	862	+2.3%
2021	786	−8.8%
Source: Censuses
