= Sudislav nad Orlicí =

- Municipality
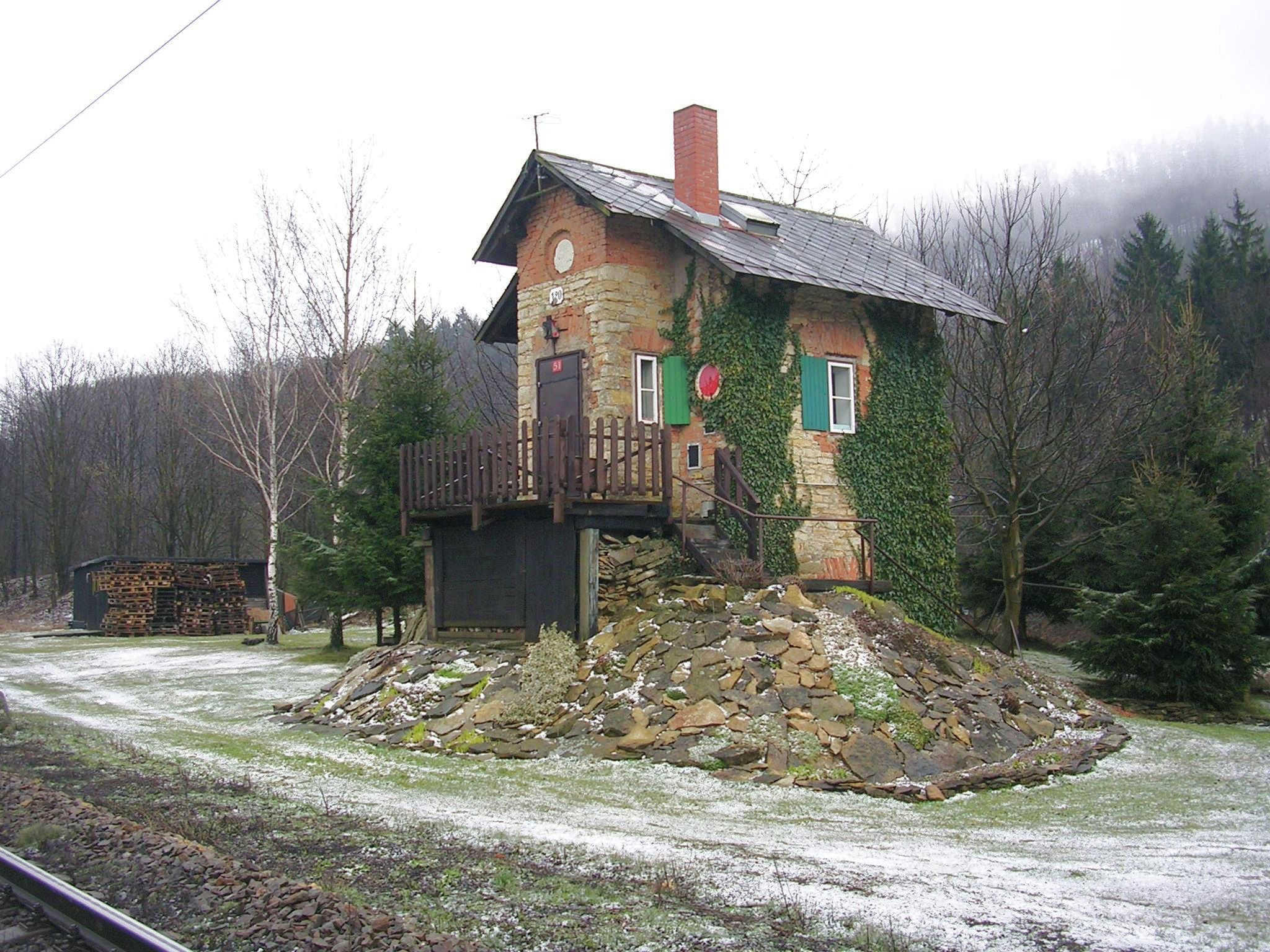
- Railway guardhouse, a cultural monument

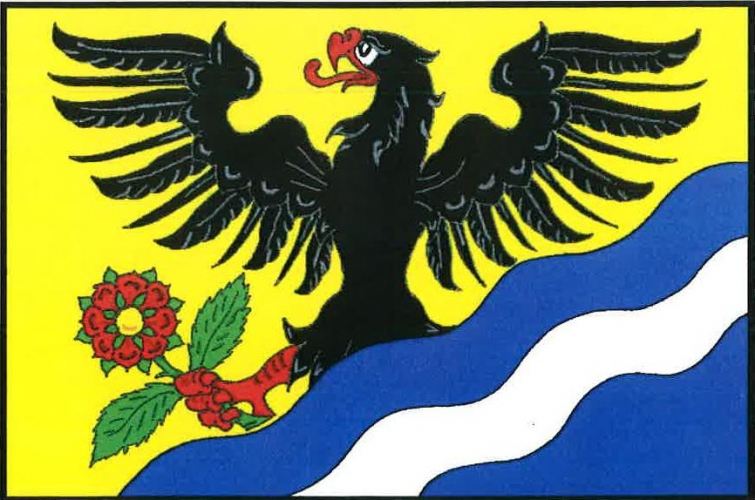
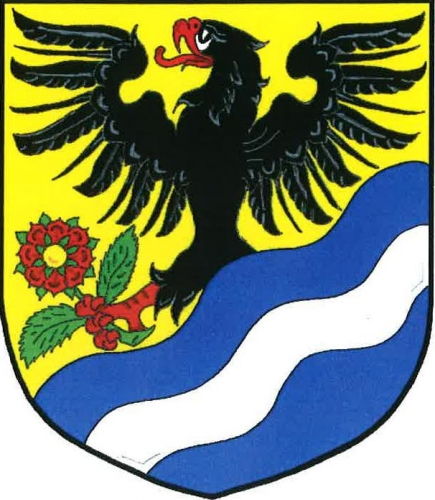
- Flag Coat of arms

- Location in the Czech Republic
- Coordinates: 49°59′22″N 16°18′48″E
- Country: Czech Republic
- Region: Pardubice
- District: Ústí nad Orlicí
- First mentioned: 1292

Area
  - Total: 6.42 km^{2} (2.48 sq mi)
- Elevation: 450 m (1,480 ft)

Population (2026-01-01)
  - Total: 151
  - Density: 23.5/km^{2} (60.9/sq mi)
- Time zone: UTC+1 (CET)
  - Summer (DST): UTC+2 (CEST)
- Postal code: 562 01
- Website: www.sudislav.cz

Sudislav nad Orlicí is a municipality and village in Ústí nad Orlicí District in the Pardubice Region of the Czech Republic. It has about 200 inhabitants.

Sudislav nad Orlicí lies approximately 7 kilometres (4 mi) west of Ústí nad Orlicí, 39 km (24 mi) east of Pardubice, and 136 km (85 mi) east of Prague.

== Administrative division ==
Sudislav nad Orlicí consists of two municipal parts (in brackets population according to the 2021 census):

- Sudislav nad Orlicí (130)
- Orlík (1)

== Demographics ==
Historical population
Year	Pop.	±%
1869	330	—
1880	364	+10.3%
1890	347	−4.7%
1900	352	+1.4%
1910	348	−1.1%
1921	309	−11.2%
1930	288	−6.8%
1950	224	−22.2%
1961	193	−13.8%
1970	154	−20.2%
1980	120	−22.1%
1991	111	−7.5%
2001	109	−1.8%
2011	121	+11.0%
2021	131	+8.3%
Source: Censuses
