= Oucmanice =

- Municipality
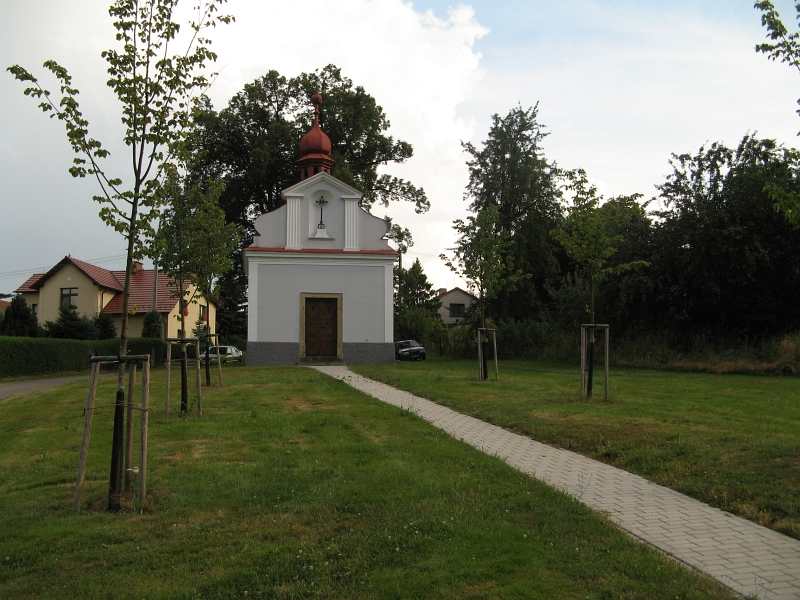
- Church of the Holy Trinity

- Flag Coat of arms

- Location in the Czech Republic
- Coordinates: 49°59′22″N 16°16′55″E
- Country: Czech Republic
- Region: Pardubice
- District: Ústí nad Orlicí
- First mentioned: 1292

Area
  - Total: 3.65 km^{2} (1.41 sq mi)
- Elevation: 380 m (1,250 ft)

Population (2026-01-01)
  - Total: 245
  - Density: 67.1/km^{2} (174/sq mi)
- Time zone: UTC+1 (CET)
  - Summer (DST): UTC+2 (CEST)
- Postal code: 562 01
- Website: www.oucmanice.cz

Oucmanice (German: Rucmanitz) is a municipality and village in Ústí nad Orlicí District in the Pardubice Region of the Czech Republic. It has about 200 inhabitants.

Oucmanice lies approximately 9 kilometres (6 mi) west of Ústí nad Orlicí, 37 km (23 mi) east of Pardubice, and 134 km (83 mi) east of Prague.

== Demographics ==
Historical population
Year	Pop.	±%
1869	266	—
1880	275	+3.4%
1890	250	−9.1%
1900	243	−2.8%
1910	259	+6.6%
1921	290	+12.0%
1930	257	−11.4%
1950	222	−13.6%
1961	226	+1.8%
1970	199	−11.9%
1980	215	+8.0%
1991	210	−2.3%
2001	219	+4.3%
2011	209	−4.6%
2021	230	+10.0%
Source: Censuses
