= Jehnědí =

- Municipality
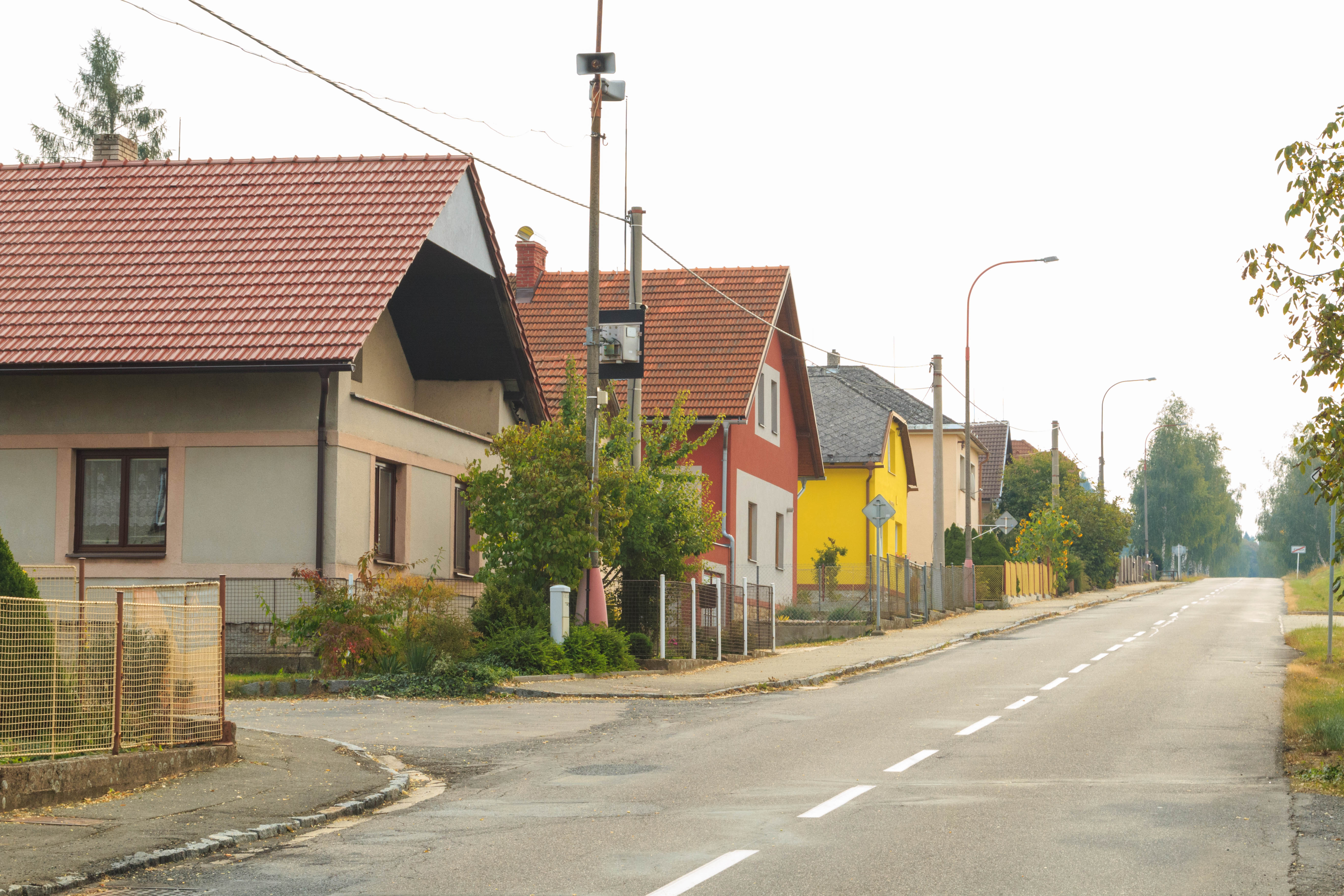
- Main street

- Flag Coat of arms

- Location in the Czech Republic
- Coordinates: 49°58′16″N 16°18′36″E
- Country: Czech Republic
- Region: Pardubice
- District: Ústí nad Orlicí
- First mentioned: 1292

Area
  - Total: 5.74 km^{2} (2.22 sq mi)
- Elevation: 430 m (1,410 ft)

Population (2026-01-01)
  - Total: 330
  - Density: 57/km^{2} (150/sq mi)
- Time zone: UTC+1 (CET)
  - Summer (DST): UTC+2 (CEST)
- Postal code: 562 01
- Website: www.jehnedi.cz

Jehnědí is a municipality and village in Ústí nad Orlicí District in the Pardubice Region of the Czech Republic. It has about 300 inhabitants.

Jehnědí lies approximately 7 kilometres (4 mi) west of Ústí nad Orlicí, 39 km (24 mi) east of Pardubice, and 136 km (85 mi) east of Prague.

== Demographics ==
Historical population
Year	Pop.	±%
1869	531	—
1880	504	−5.1%
1890	509	+1.0%
1900	514	+1.0%
1910	520	+1.2%
1921	513	−1.3%
1930	514	+0.2%
1950	324	−37.0%
1961	330	+1.9%
1970	337	+2.1%
1980	313	−7.1%
1991	291	−7.0%
2001	306	+5.2%
2011	315	+2.9%
2021	303	−3.8%
Source: Censuses
