= Pustina =

- Municipality
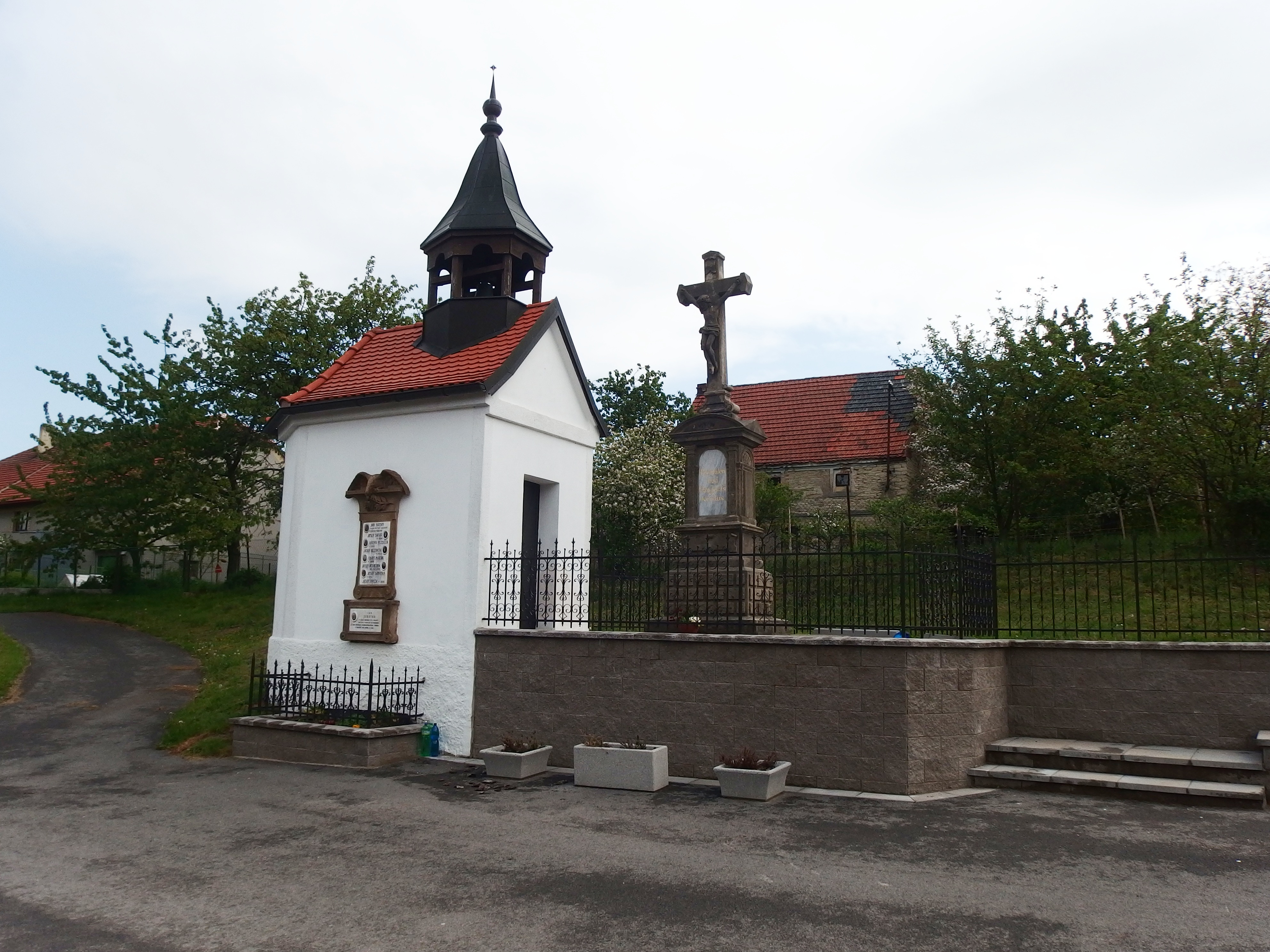
- Chapel with a cross

- Flag Coat of arms

- Location in the Czech Republic
- Coordinates: 49°53′58″N 16°6′18″E
- Country: Czech Republic
- Region: Pardubice
- District: Ústí nad Orlicí
- First mentioned: 1720

Area
  - Total: 2.84 km^{2} (1.10 sq mi)
- Elevation: 448 m (1,470 ft)

Population (2026-01-01)
  - Total: 67
  - Density: 24/km^{2} (61/sq mi)
- Time zone: UTC+1 (CET)
  - Summer (DST): UTC+2 (CEST)
- Postal code: 566 01
- Website: www.pustina.info

Pustina is a municipality and village in Ústí nad Orlicí District in the Pardubice Region of the Czech Republic. It has about 70 inhabitants.

Pustina lies approximately 23 kilometres (14 mi) west of Ústí nad Orlicí, 29 km (18 mi) south-east of Pardubice, and 123 km (76 mi) east of Prague.

== Demographics ==
Historical population
Year	Pop.	±%
1869	226	—
1880	252	+11.5%
1890	248	−1.6%
1900	239	−3.6%
1910	238	−0.4%
1921	248	+4.2%
1930	223	−10.1%
1950	178	−20.2%
1961	183	+2.8%
1970	168	−8.2%
1980	122	−27.4%
1991	95	−22.1%
2001	67	−29.5%
2011	72	+7.5%
2021	71	−1.4%
Source: Censuses
