= Bošín =

- Municipality
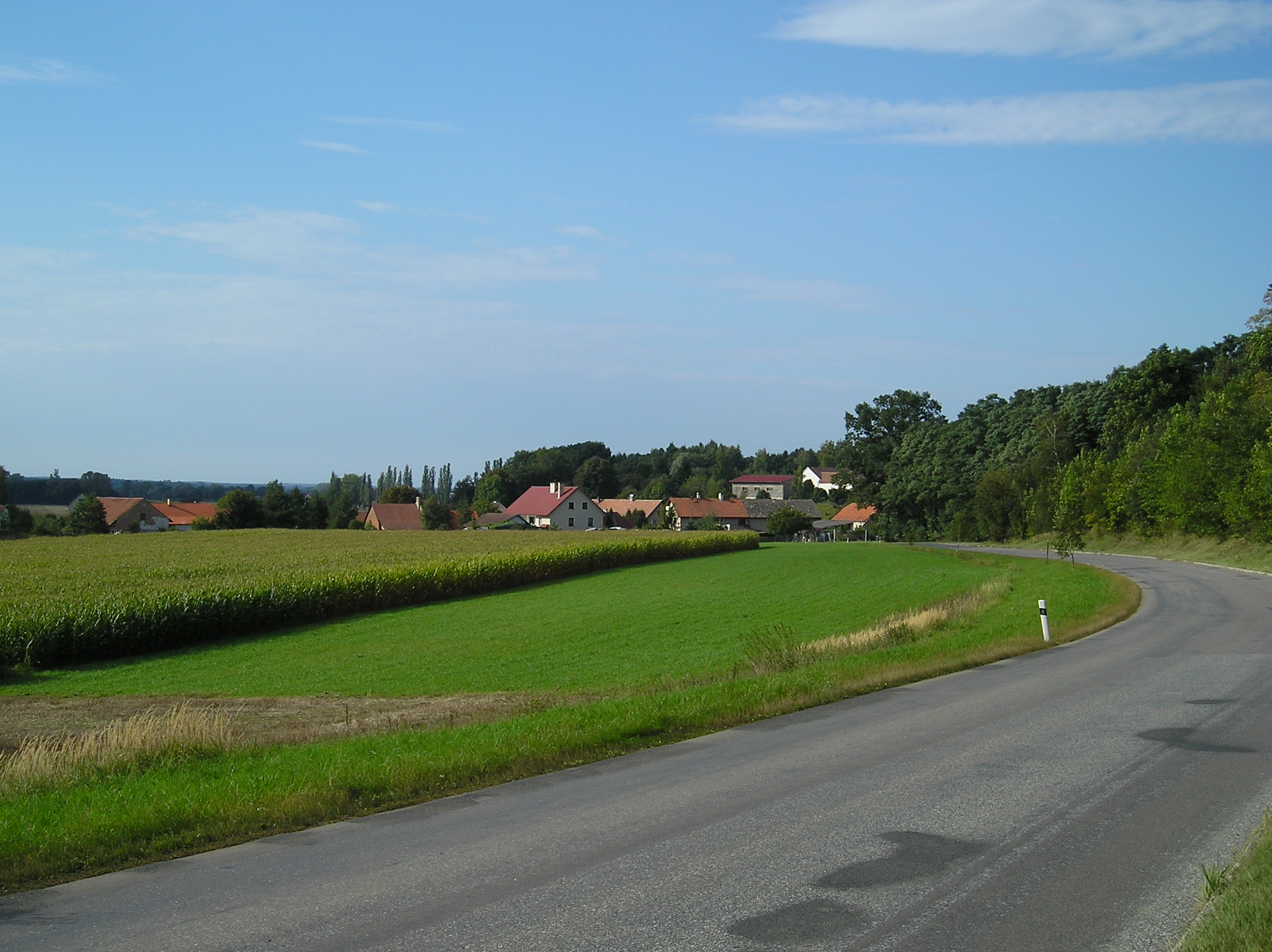
- General view

- Location in the Czech Republic
- Coordinates: 50°2′3″N 16°12′11″E
- Country: Czech Republic
- Region: Pardubice
- District: Ústí nad Orlicí
- First mentioned: 1371

Area
  - Total: 2.52 km^{2} (0.97 sq mi)
- Elevation: 280 m (920 ft)

Population (2026-01-01)
  - Total: 101
  - Density: 40.1/km^{2} (104/sq mi)
- Time zone: UTC+1 (CET)
  - Summer (DST): UTC+2 (CEST)
- Postal code: 565 01
- Website: bosin.cz

Bošín is a municipality and village in Ústí nad Orlicí District in the Pardubice Region of the Czech Republic. It has about 100 inhabitants.

== Demographics ==
Historical population
Year	Pop.	±%
1869	203	—
1880	188	−7.4%
1890	180	−4.3%
1900	193	+7.2%
1910	164	−15.0%
1921	174	+6.1%
1930	164	−5.7%
1950	141	−14.0%
1961	133	−5.7%
1970	106	−20.3%
1980	94	−11.3%
1991	80	−14.9%
2001	81	+1.2%
2011	89	+9.9%
2021	96	+7.9%
Source: Censuses
