= Kameničná (Ústí nad Orlicí District) =

- Municipality
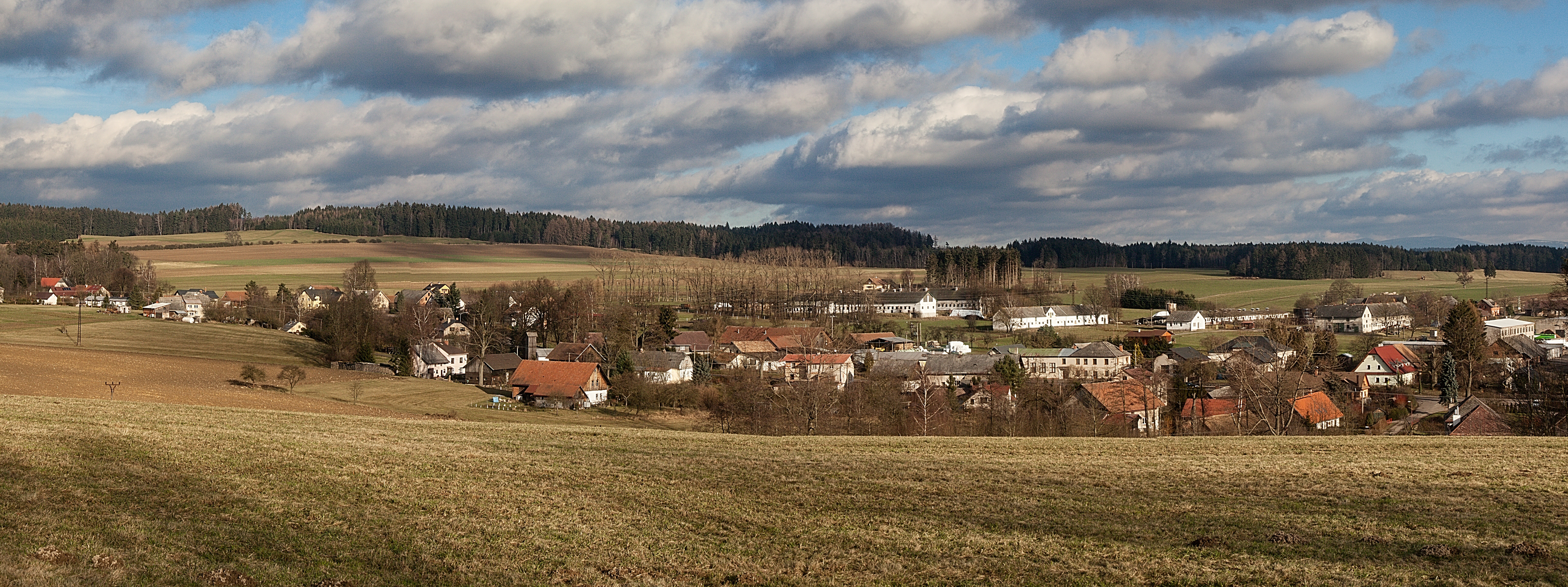
- General view

- Flag Coat of arms

- Location in the Czech Republic
- Coordinates: 50°7′13″N 16°26′6″E
- Country: Czech Republic
- Region: Pardubice
- District: Ústí nad Orlicí
- First mentioned: 1365

Area
  - Total: 5.85 km^{2} (2.26 sq mi)
- Elevation: 463 m (1,519 ft)

Population (2026-01-01)
  - Total: 338
  - Density: 57.8/km^{2} (150/sq mi)
- Time zone: UTC+1 (CET)
  - Summer (DST): UTC+2 (CEST)
- Postal code: 564 01
- Website: www.kamenicna.cz

Kameničná is a municipality and village in Ústí nad Orlicí District in the Pardubice Region of the Czech Republic. It has about 300 inhabitants.

Kameničná lies approximately 17 kilometres (11 mi) north of Ústí nad Orlicí, 48 km (30 mi) east of Pardubice, and 145 km (90 mi) east of Prague.

== Demographics ==
Historical population
Year	Pop.	±%
1869	384	—
1880	399	+3.9%
1890	406	+1.8%
1900	375	−7.6%
1910	340	−9.3%
1921	336	−1.2%
1930	336	+0.0%
1950	291	−13.4%
1961	279	−4.1%
1970	273	−2.2%
1980	328	+20.1%
1991	355	+8.2%
2001	356	+0.3%
2011	304	−14.6%
2021	311	+2.3%
Source: Censuses
