= Strážná =

- Municipality
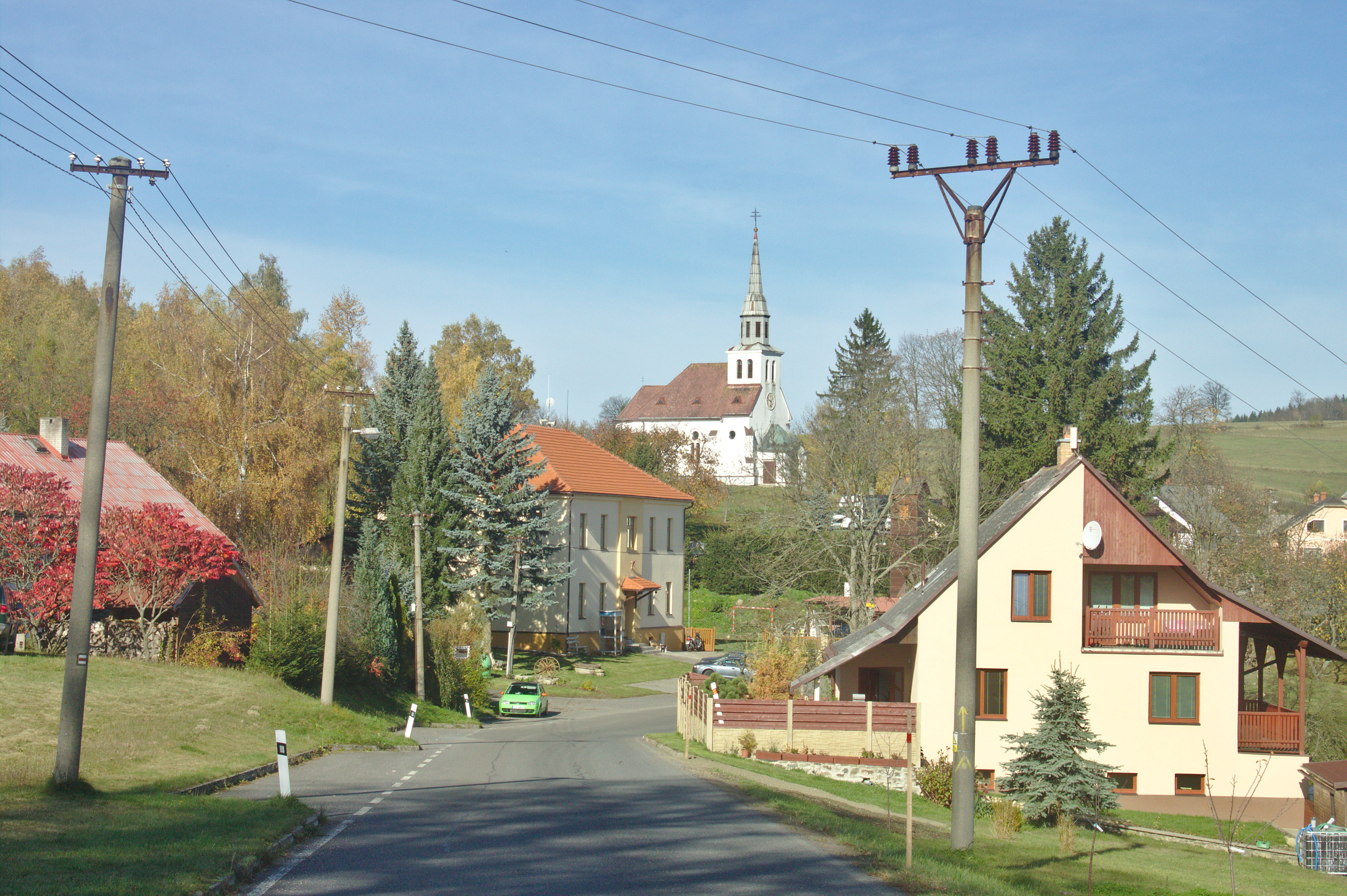
- View towards the Church of Saint Isidore

- Flag Coat of arms

- Location in the Czech Republic
- Coordinates: 49°54′41″N 16°42′39″E
- Country: Czech Republic
- Region: Pardubice
- District: Ústí nad Orlicí
- First mentioned: 1350

Area
  - Total: 10.63 km^{2} (4.10 sq mi)
- Elevation: 605 m (1,985 ft)

Population (2026-01-01)
  - Total: 110
  - Density: 10/km^{2} (27/sq mi)
- Time zone: UTC+1 (CET)
  - Summer (DST): UTC+2 (CEST)
- Postal code: 563 01
- Website: www.strazna.cz

Strážná is a municipality and village in Ústí nad Orlicí District in the Pardubice Region of the Czech Republic. It has about 100 inhabitants.

Strážná lies approximately 24 kilometres (15 mi) east of Ústí nad Orlicí, 69 km (43 mi) east of Pardubice, and 166 km (103 mi) east of Prague.

== Demographics ==
Historical population
Year	Pop.	±%
1869	669	—
1880	624	−6.7%
1890	620	−0.6%
1900	517	−16.6%
1910	518	+0.2%
1921	477	−7.9%
1930	393	−17.6%
1950	174	−55.7%
1961	157	−9.8%
1970	165	+5.1%
1980	151	−8.5%
1991	114	−24.5%
2001	98	−14.0%
2011	108	+10.2%
2021	113	+4.6%
Source: Censuses
