= České Petrovice =

- Municipality
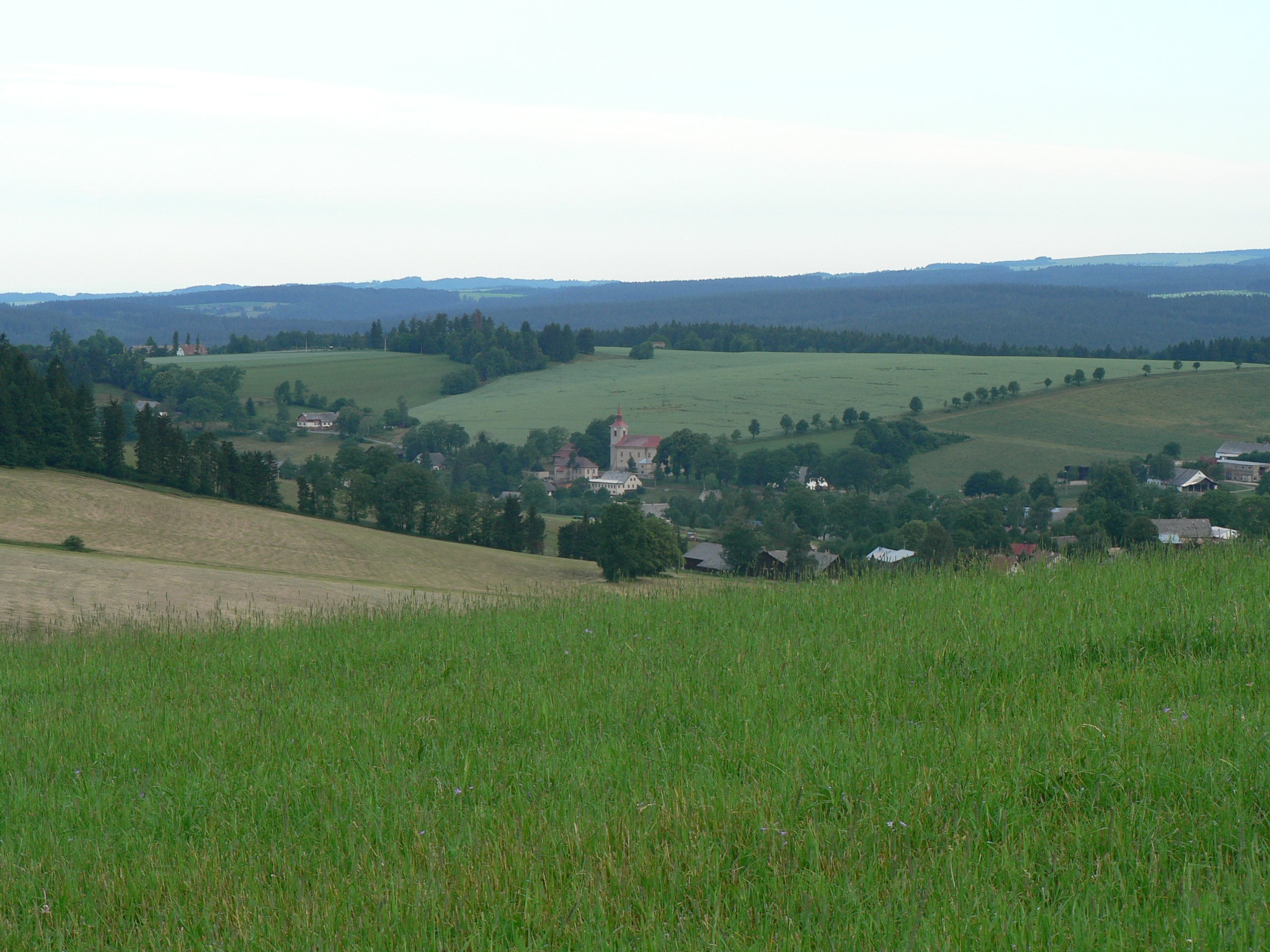
- View from the south

- Flag Coat of arms

- Location in the Czech Republic
- Coordinates: 50°7′9″N 16°36′20″E
- Country: Czech Republic
- Region: Pardubice
- District: Ústí nad Orlicí
- First mentioned: 1601

Area
  - Total: 6.30 km^{2} (2.43 sq mi)
- Elevation: 645 m (2,116 ft)

Population (2026-01-01)
  - Total: 157
  - Density: 24.9/km^{2} (64.5/sq mi)
- Time zone: UTC+1 (CET)
  - Summer (DST): UTC+2 (CEST)
- Postal code: 564 01
- Website: www.obecceskepetrovice.cz

České Petrovice (German: Böhmisch Petersdorf) is a municipality and village in Ústí nad Orlicí District in the Pardubice Region of the Czech Republic. It has about 200 inhabitants.

== Geography ==
České Petrovice is located in the Orlické Mountains, on the border with Poland.

== Demographics ==
Historical population
Year	Pop.	±%
1869	869	—
1880	882	+1.5%
1890	876	−0.7%
1900	657	−25.0%
1910	531	−19.2%
1921	467	−12.1%
1930	443	−5.1%
1950	179	−59.6%
1961	208	+16.2%
1970	174	−16.3%
1980	172	−1.1%
1991	159	−7.6%
2001	148	−6.9%
2011	145	−2.0%
2021	152	+4.8%
Source: Censuses
