= Damníkov =

- Municipality
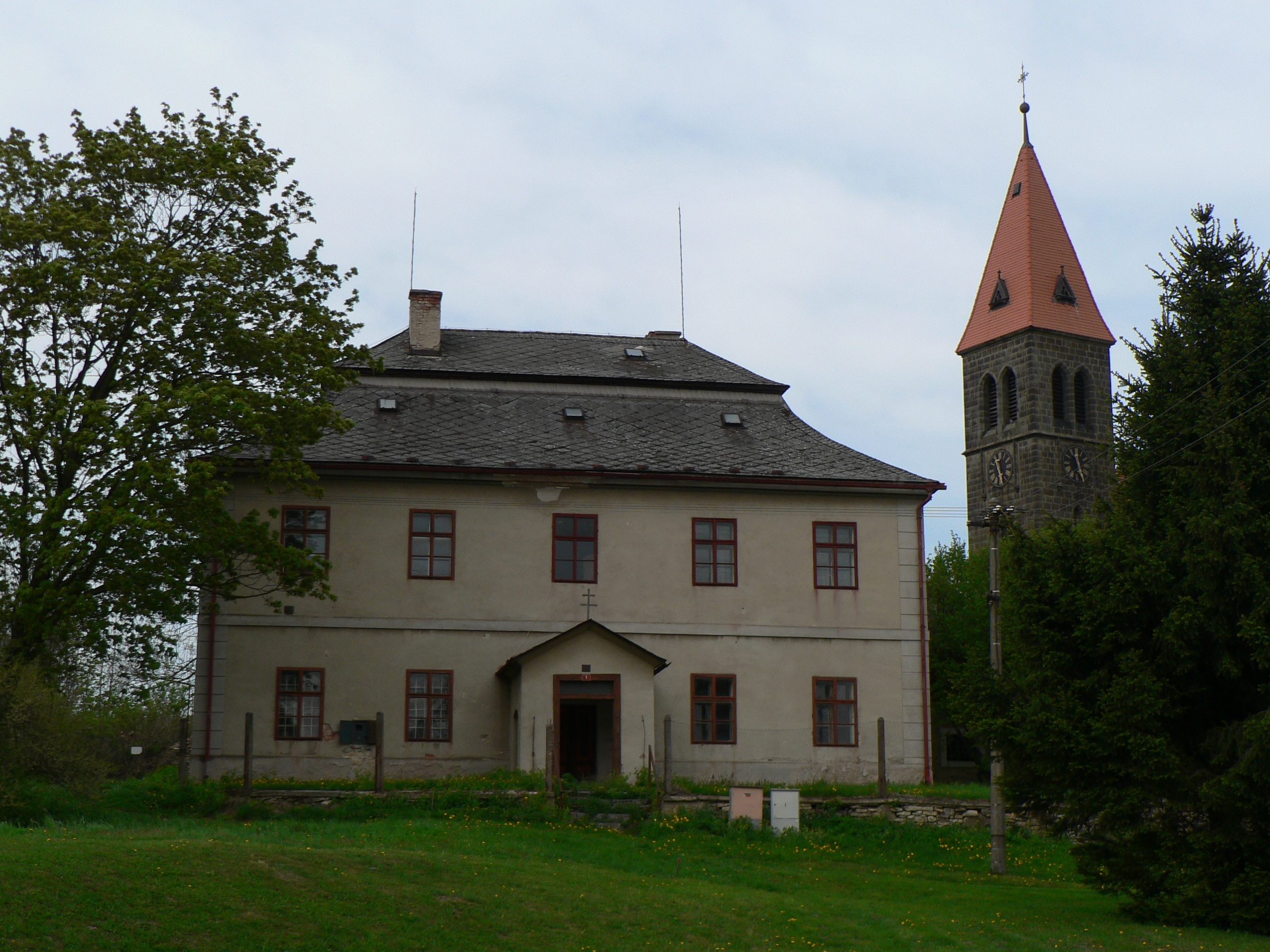
- Rectory

- Flag Coat of arms

- Location in the Czech Republic
- Coordinates: 49°52′17″N 16°33′37″E
- Country: Czech Republic
- Region: Pardubice
- District: Ústí nad Orlicí
- First mentioned: 1304

Area
  - Total: 12.72 km^{2} (4.91 sq mi)
- Elevation: 362 m (1,188 ft)

Population (2026-01-01)
  - Total: 698
  - Density: 54.9/km^{2} (142/sq mi)
- Time zone: UTC+1 (CET)
  - Summer (DST): UTC+2 (CEST)
- Postal code: 561 23
- Website: www.damnikov.cz

Damníkov is a municipality and village in Ústí nad Orlicí District in the Pardubice Region of the Czech Republic. It has about 700 inhabitants.

== Demographics ==
Historical population
Year	Pop.	±%
1869	1,293	—
1880	1,337	+3.4%
1890	1,344	+0.5%
1900	1,231	−8.4%
1910	1,255	+1.9%
1921	1,179	−6.1%
1930	1,043	−11.5%
1950	632	−39.4%
1961	683	+8.1%
1970	616	−9.8%
1980	624	+1.3%
1991	653	+4.6%
2001	667	+2.1%
2011	679	+1.8%
2021	649	−4.4%
Source: Censuses
