= Bystřec =

- Municipality
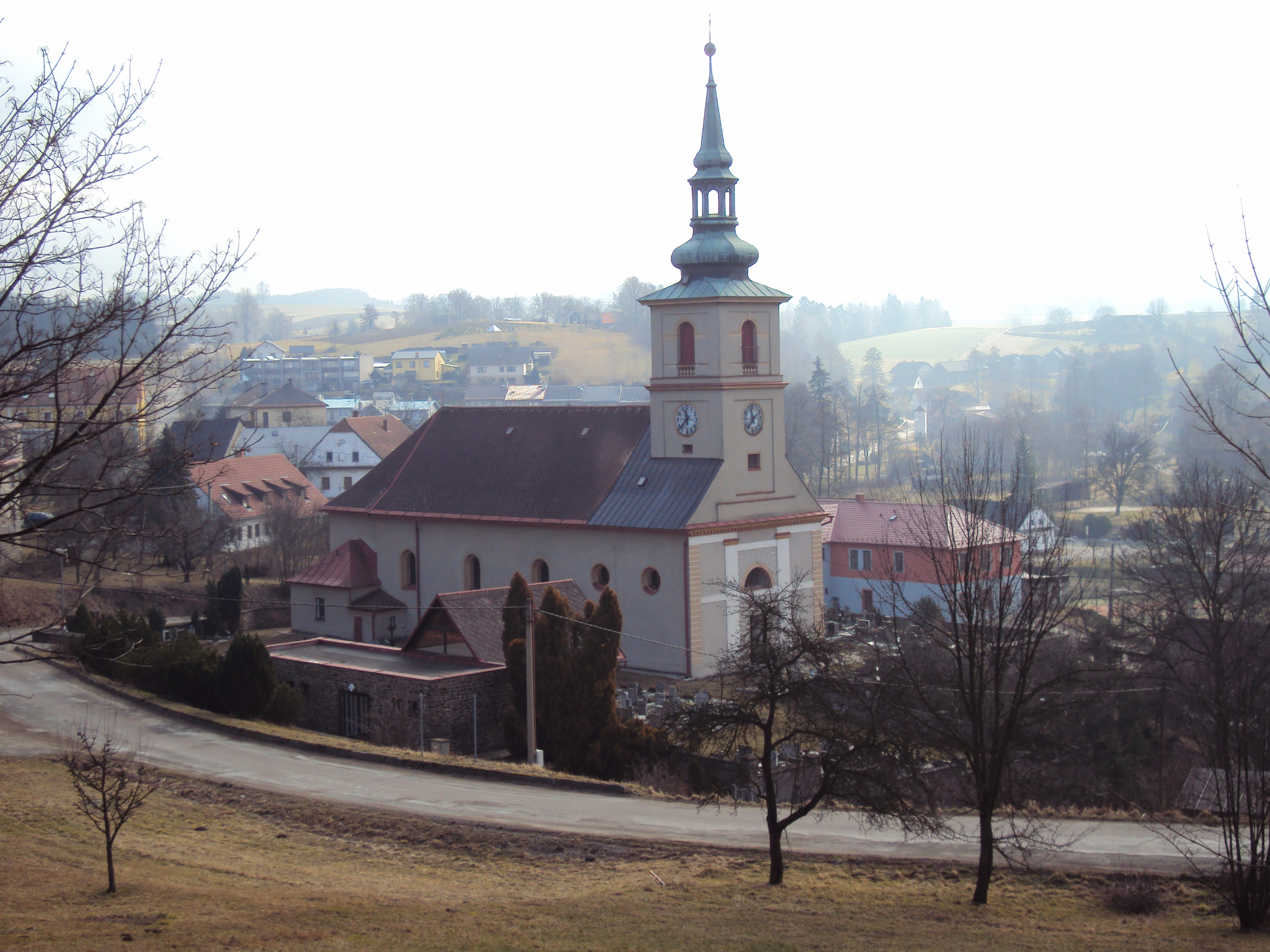
- Church of Saint James the Great

- Flag Coat of arms

- Location in the Czech Republic
- Coordinates: 49°59′34″N 16°29′52″E
- Country: Czech Republic
- Region: Pardubice
- District: Ústí nad Orlicí
- First mentioned: 1304

Area
  - Total: 18.14 km^{2} (7.00 sq mi)
- Elevation: 490 m (1,610 ft)

Population (2026-01-01)
  - Total: 1,148
  - Density: 63.29/km^{2} (163.9/sq mi)
- Time zone: UTC+1 (CET)
  - Summer (DST): UTC+2 (CEST)
- Postal code: 561 54
- Website: www.bystrec.cz

Bystřec (German: Waltersdorf) is a municipality and village in Ústí nad Orlicí District in the Pardubice Region of the Czech Republic. It has about 1,100 inhabitants.

== History ==
The first written mention of Bystřec is from 1304. It was founded on the crossroads of two old trade routes.

== Demographics ==
Historical population
Year	Pop.	±%
1869	1,565	—
1880	1,573	+0.5%
1890	1,530	−2.7%
1900	1,421	−7.1%
1910	1,456	+2.5%
1921	1,400	−3.8%
1930	1,421	+1.5%
1950	1,089	−23.4%
1961	1,032	−5.2%
1970	1,018	−1.4%
1980	1,042	+2.4%
1991	1,064	+2.1%
2001	1,043	−2.0%
2011	1,097	+5.2%
2021	1,121	+2.2%
Source: Censuses
