= Běstovice =

Municipality in the Czech Republic

- Municipality
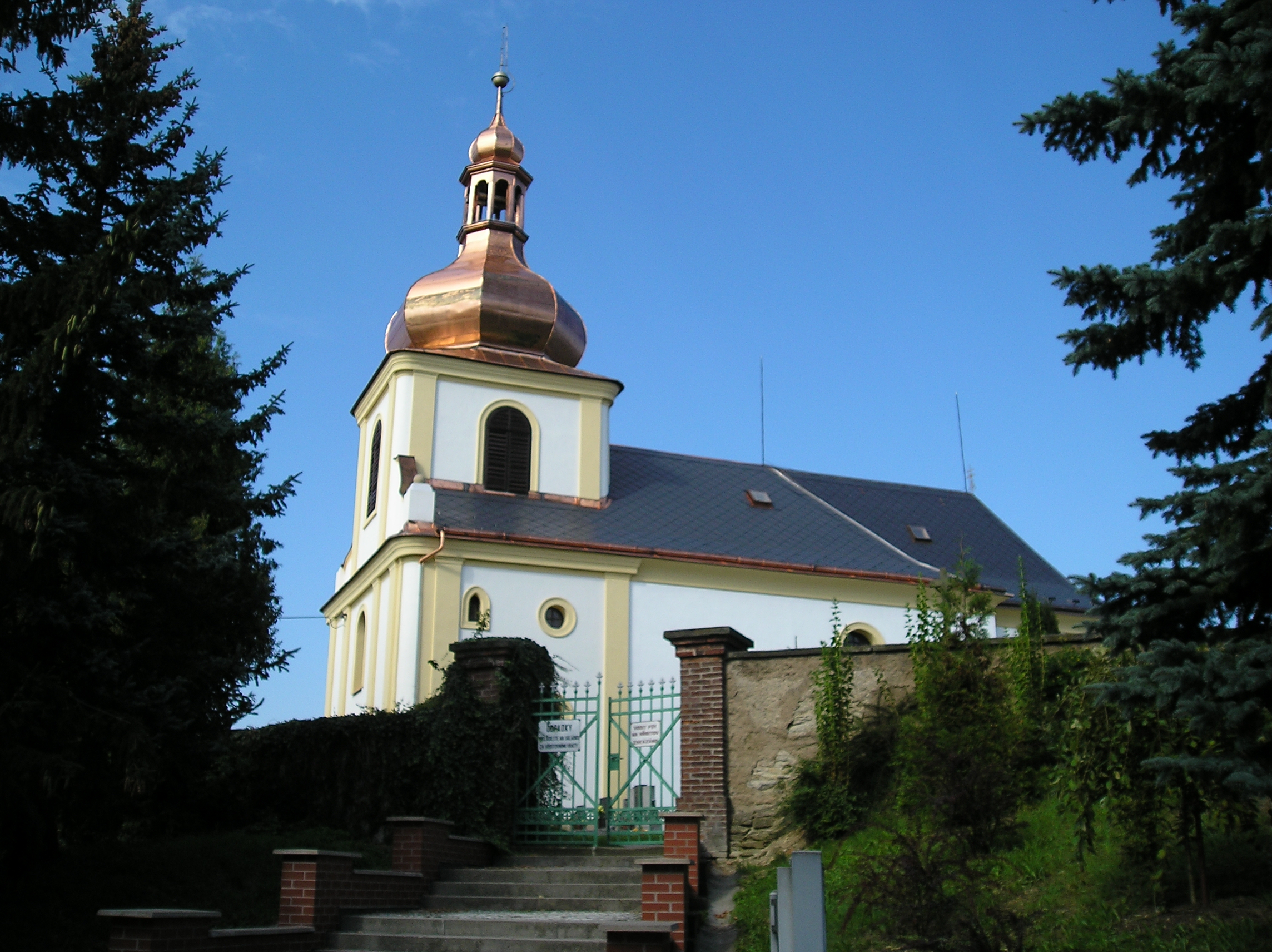
- Church of All Saints

- Flag Coat of arms

- Location in the Czech Republic
- Coordinates: 50°1′13″N 16°12′40″E
- Country: Czech Republic
- Region: Pardubice
- District: Ústí nad Orlicí
- First mentioned: 1292

Area
  - Total: 4.19 km^{2} (1.62 sq mi)
- Elevation: 287 m (942 ft)

Population (2026-01-01)
  - Total: 436
  - Density: 104/km^{2} (270/sq mi)
- Time zone: UTC+1 (CET)
  - Summer (DST): UTC+2 (CEST)
- Postal code: 565 01
- Website: www.bestovice.cz

Běstovice (German: Bestowitz) is a municipality and village in Ústí nad Orlicí District in the Pardubice Region of the Czech Republic. It has about 400 inhabitants.

== Demographics ==
Historical population
Year	Pop.	±%
1869	402	—
1880	406	+1.0%
1890	395	−2.7%
1900	372	−5.8%
1910	382	+2.7%
1921	347	−9.2%
1930	368	+6.1%
1950	298	−19.0%
1961	335	+12.4%
1970	367	+9.6%
1980	323	−12.0%
1991	376	+16.4%
2001	417	+10.9%
2011	449	+7.7%
2021	407	−9.4%
Source: Censuses
