= Sopotnice =

- Municipality
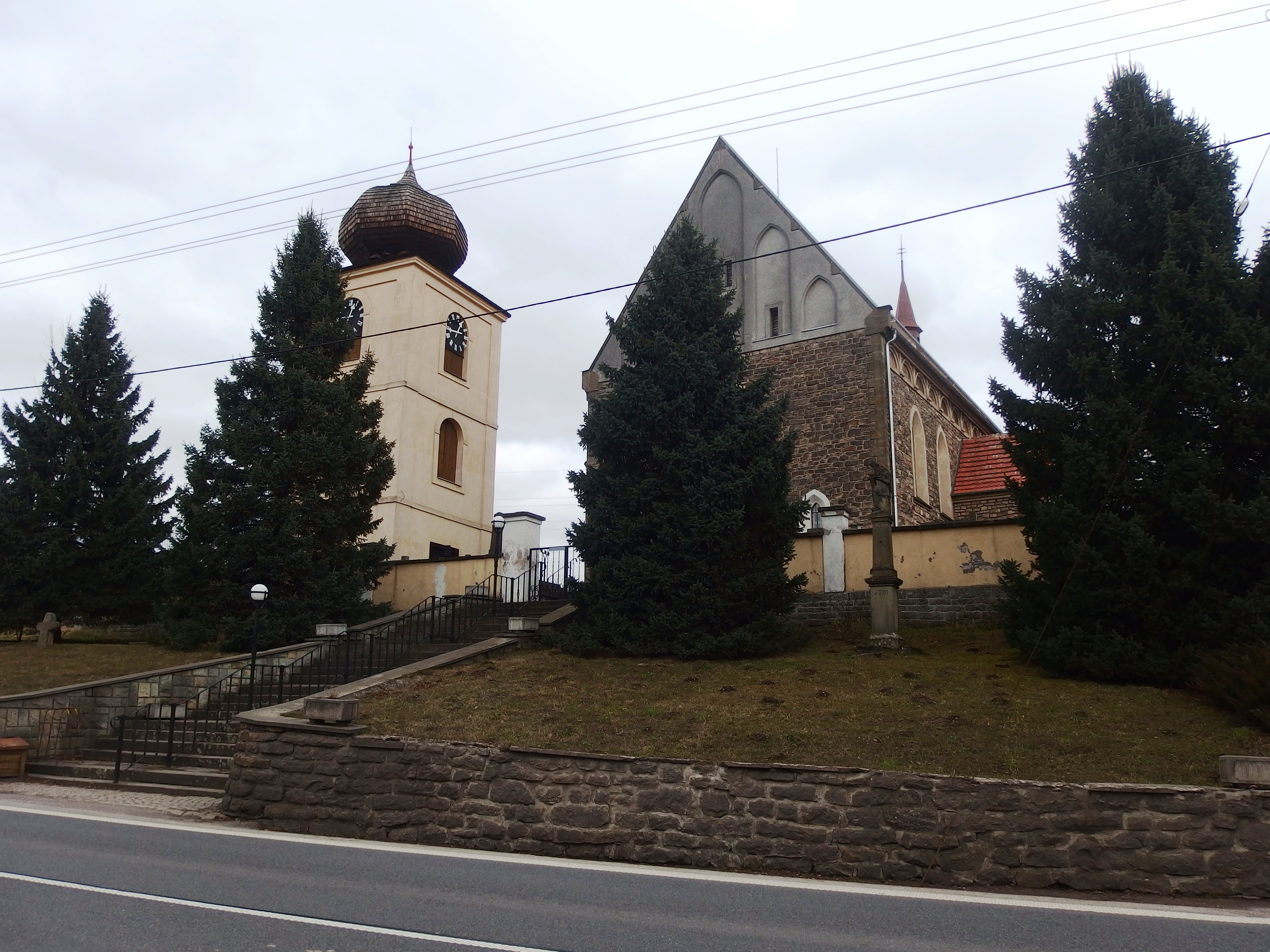
- Church of Saint Sigismund with the belfry

- Flag Coat of arms

- Location in the Czech Republic
- Coordinates: 50°3′33″N 16°20′43″E
- Country: Czech Republic
- Region: Pardubice
- District: Ústí nad Orlicí
- First mentioned: 1356

Area
  - Total: 13.57 km^{2} (5.24 sq mi)
- Elevation: 345 m (1,132 ft)

Population (2026-01-01)
  - Total: 941
  - Density: 69.3/km^{2} (180/sq mi)
- Time zone: UTC+1 (CET)
  - Summer (DST): UTC+2 (CEST)
- Postal code: 561 15
- Website: www.obecsopotnice.cz

Sopotnice (German: Sopotnitz) is a municipality and village in Ústí nad Orlicí District in the Pardubice Region of the Czech Republic. It has about 900 inhabitants.

Sopotnice lies approximately 10 kilometres (6 mi) north-west of Ústí nad Orlicí, 41 km (25 mi) east of Pardubice, and 138 km (86 mi) east of Prague.

== Demographics ==
Historical population
Year	Pop.	±%
1869	1,374	—
1880	1,491	+8.5%
1890	1,505	+0.9%
1900	1,443	−4.1%
1910	1,493	+3.5%
1921	1,462	−2.1%
1930	1,430	−2.2%
1950	1,049	−26.6%
1961	1,087	+3.6%
1970	1,031	−5.2%
1980	1,038	+0.7%
1991	960	−7.5%
2001	932	−2.9%
2011	922	−1.1%
2021	864	−6.3%
Source: Censuses
