= Řepníky =

- Municipality
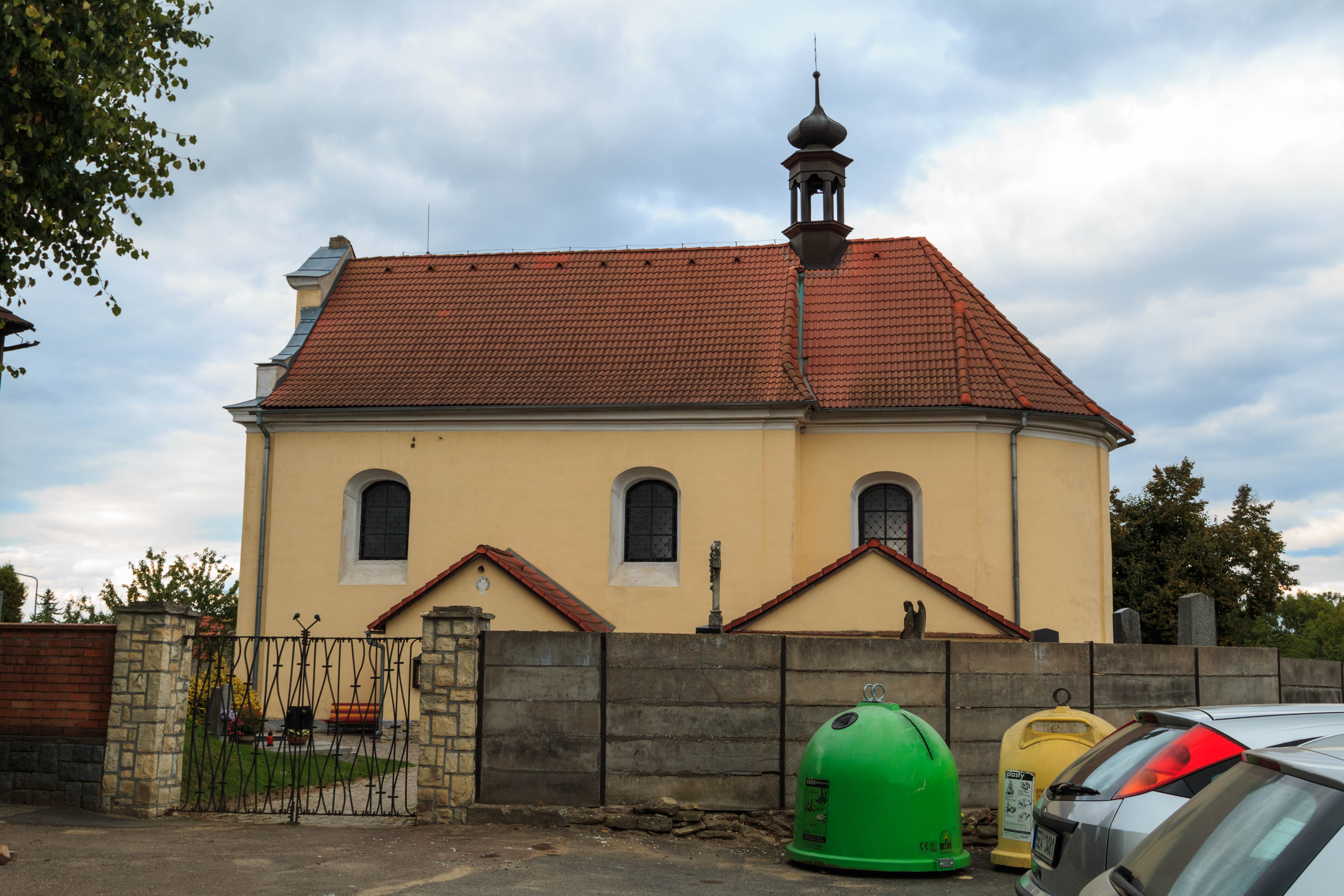
- Church of Saint Lawrence

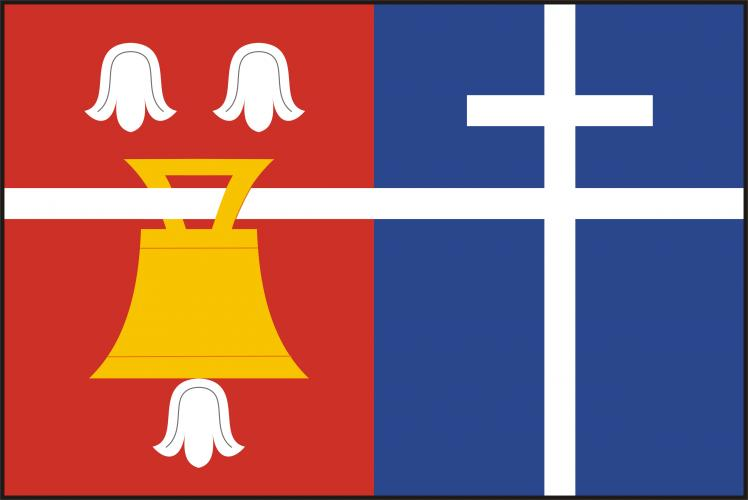
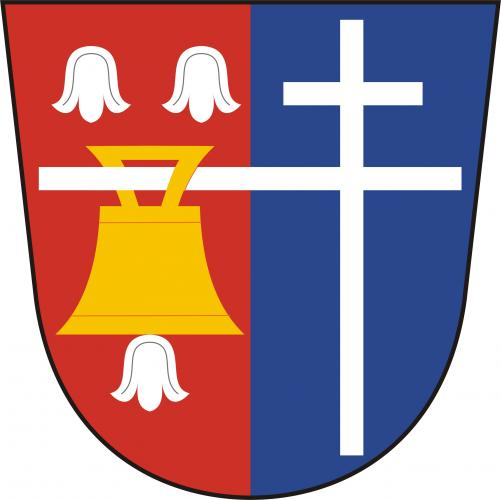
- Flag Coat of arms

- Location in the Czech Republic
- Coordinates: 49°54′5″N 16°4′47″E
- Country: Czech Republic
- Region: Pardubice
- District: Ústí nad Orlicí
- First mentioned: 1167

Area
  - Total: 10.96 km^{2} (4.23 sq mi)
- Elevation: 430 m (1,410 ft)

Population (2026-01-01)
  - Total: 387
  - Density: 35.3/km^{2} (91.5/sq mi)
- Time zone: UTC+1 (CET)
  - Summer (DST): UTC+2 (CEST)
- Postal codes: 538 54, 538 65, 566 01
- Website: www.obecrepniky.cz

Řepníky (German: Repnik) is a municipality and village in Ústí nad Orlicí District in the Pardubice Region of the Czech Republic. It has about 400 inhabitants.

== Administrative division ==
Řepníky consists of three municipal parts (in brackets population according to the 2021 census):

- Řepníky (283)
- Pěšice (47)
- Popovec (47)

== Demographics ==
Historical population
Year	Pop.	±%
1869	880	—
1880	908	+3.2%
1890	918	+1.1%
1900	973	+6.0%
1910	955	−1.8%
1921	930	−2.6%
1930	875	−5.9%
1950	688	−21.4%
1961	686	−0.3%
1970	564	−17.8%
1980	479	−15.1%
1991	379	−20.9%
2001	410	+8.2%
2011	376	−8.3%
2021	377	+0.3%
Source: Censuses
