= Ústí nad Orlicí District =

Ústí nad Orlicí District Okres Ústí nad Orlicí
- District
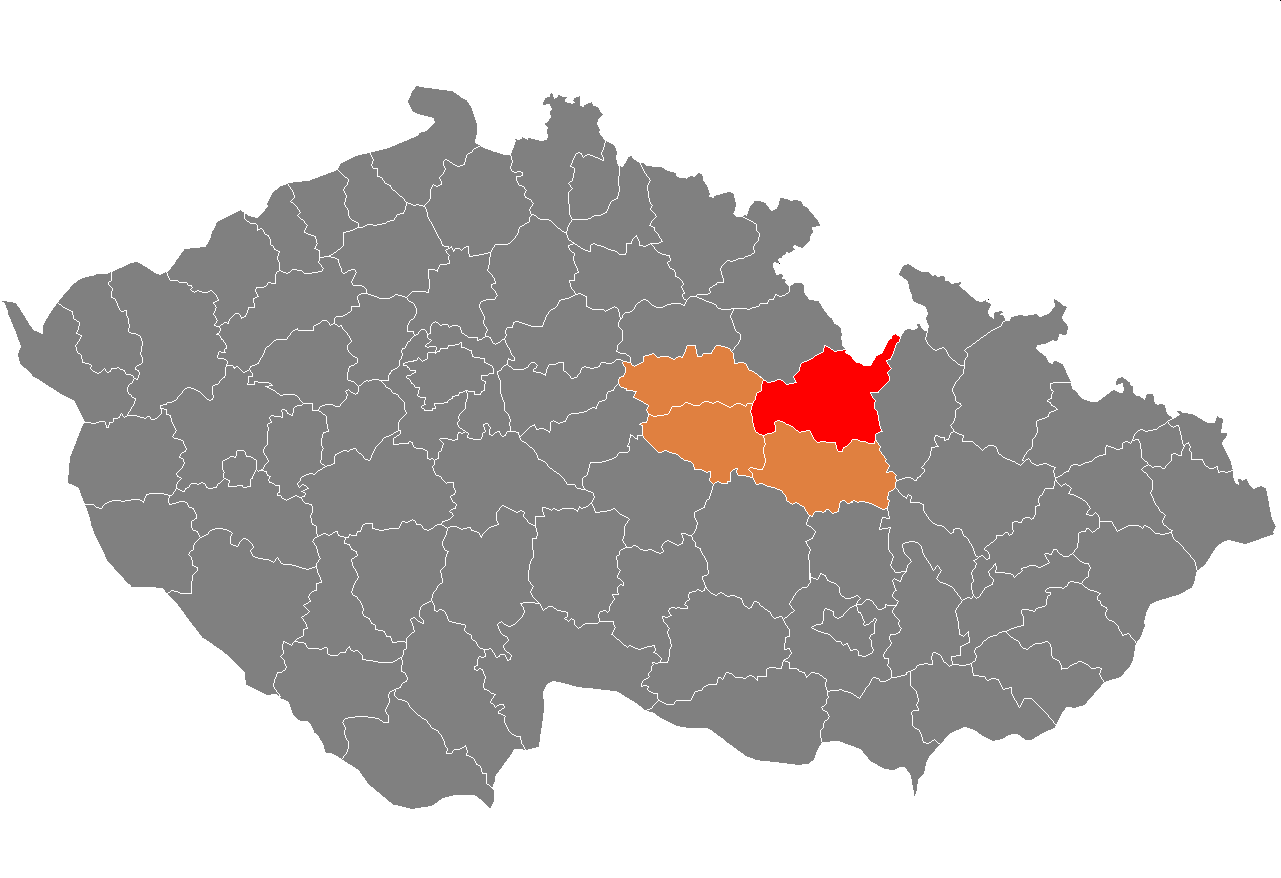
- Location in the Pardubice Region within the Czech Republic
- Coordinates: 50°2′N 16°30′E
- Country: Czech Republic
- Region: Pardubice
- Capital: Ústí nad Orlicí

Area
  - Total: 1,267.46 km^{2} (489.37 sq mi)

Population (2026)
  - Total: 138,301
  - Density: 109.117/km^{2} (282.611/sq mi)
- Time zone: UTC+1 (CET)
  - Summer (DST): UTC+2 (CEST)
- Municipalities: 115
- * Towns: 10
- * Market towns: 4

Ústí nad Orlicí District (Czech: okres Ústí nad Orlicí) is a district in the Pardubice Region of the Czech Republic. Its capital is the town of Ústí nad Orlicí, but the most populous town is Česká Třebová.

== Administrative division ==
Ústí nad Orlicí District is divided into six administrative districts of municipalities with extended competence: Ústí nad Orlicí, Česká Třebová, Králíky, Lanškroun, Vysoké Mýto and Žamberk.

=== List of municipalities ===
Towns are marked in bold and market towns in italics:

Albrechtice – Anenská Studánka – Běstovice – Bošín – Brandýs nad Orlicí – Bučina – Bystřec – Čenkovice – Červená Voda – Česká Rybná – Česká Třebová – České Heřmanice – České Libchavy – České Petrovice – Choceň – Cotkytle – Damníkov – Dlouhá Třebová – Dlouhoňovice – Dobříkov – Dolní Čermná – Dolní Dobrouč – Dolní Morava – Džbánov – Hejnice – Helvíkovice – Hnátnice – Horní Čermná – Horní Heřmanice – Horní Třešňovec – Hrádek – Hrušová – Jablonné nad Orlicí – Jamné nad Orlicí – Javorník – Jehnědí – Kameničná – Klášterec nad Orlicí – Koldín – Kosořín – Králíky – Krasíkov – Kunvald – Lanškroun – Leština – Letohrad – Libecina – Libchavy – Lichkov – Líšnice – Lubník – Lukavice – Luková – Mistrovice – Mladkov – Mostek – Nasavrky – Nekoř – Nové Hrady – Orlické Podhůří – Orličky – Ostrov – Oucmanice – Pastviny – Petrovice – Písečná – Plchovice – Podlesí – Přívrat – Pustina – Radhošť – Řepníky – Řetová – Řetůvka – Rudoltice – Rybník – Sázava – Seč – Šedivec – Semanín – Skořenice – Slatina – Sobkovice – Sopotnice – Sruby – Stradouň – Strážná – Studené – Sudislav nad Orlicí – Sudslava – Svatý Jiří – Tatenice – Těchonín – Tisová – Třebovice – Trpík – Týnišťko – Újezd u Chocně – Ústí nad Orlicí – Velká Skrovnice – Verměřovice – Vinary – Voděrady – Vraclav – Vračovice-Orlov – Výprachtice – Vysoké Mýto – Záchlumí – Zádolí – Zálší – Žamberk – Žampach – Zámrsk – Zářecká Lhota – Žichlínek

== Geography ==
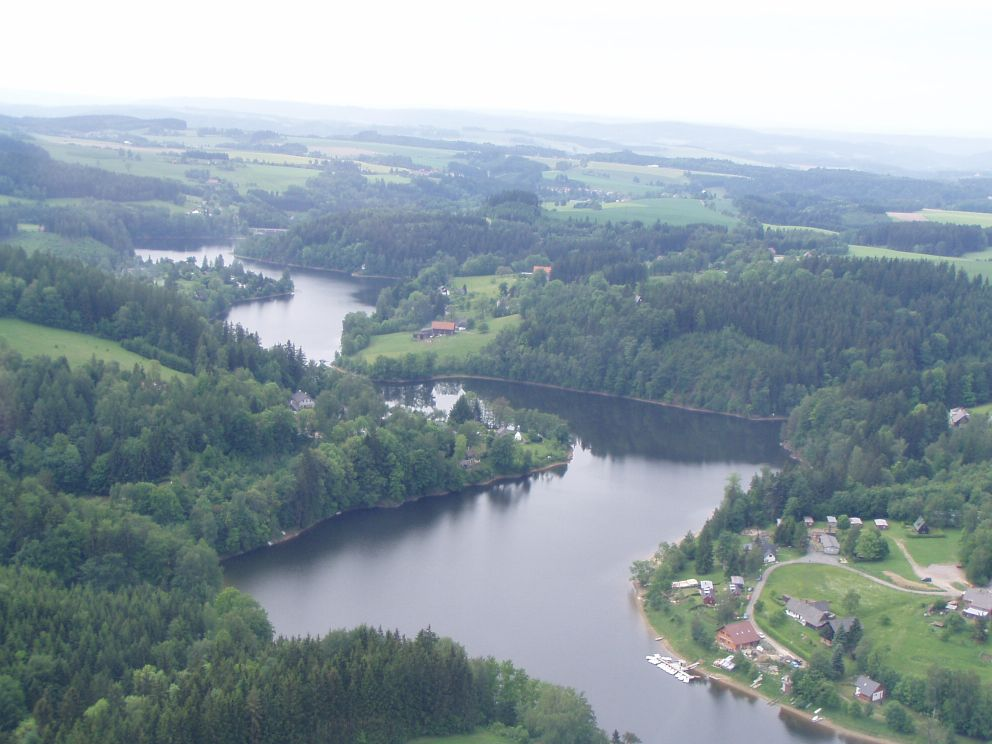
Pastviny Reservoir and surrounding landscape

Ústí nad Orlicí District borders Poland in the north. In lies mostly in the historical land of Bohemia, but the eastern edge lies in Moravia.

The landscape is very rugged and varied. While in the west there are plains, in the east there is mountainous terrain. The territory extends into eight geomorphological mesoregions: Svitavy Uplands (west), Orlice Table (northwest), Orlické Foothills (centre), Orlické Mountains (north), Zábřeh Highlands (southeast), Hanušovice Highlands (east), Králický Sněžník Mountains (northeast), and Kłodzko Valley (a narrow strip in the east). The highest point of the district and of the entire Pardubice Region is the Králický Sněžník mountain in Dolní Morava with an elevation of 1,423 m (4,669 ft). The lowest point is the river bed of the Loučná in Radhošť at 244 m (801 ft).

From the total district area of 1,267.5 km^{2} (489.4 sq mi), agricultural land occupies 744.1 km^{2} (287.3 sq mi), forests occupy 404.4 km^{2} (156.1 sq mi), and water area occupies 14.5 km^{2} (5.6 sq mi). Forests cover 31.9% of the district's area.

The longest river in the district is the Tichá Orlice. The Morava River originates here, but soon leaves the territory. Other notable rivers in the district are the Divoká Orlice, Loučná, Moravská Sázava and Třebovka. Apart from the western part of the district, there are not many bodies of water. The largest body of water is Pastviny Reservoir with an area of about 110 ha (270 acres).

There are no large-scale protected areas.

== Demographics ==
Historical population

Year	Pop.	±%
1869	150,395	—
1880	152,496	+1.4%
1890	154,673	+1.4%
1900	154,328	−0.2%
1910	160,828	+4.2%

Year	Pop.	±%
1921	152,120	−5.4%
1930	155,436	+2.2%
1950	124,103	−20.2%
1961	129,516	+4.4%
1970	129,898	+0.3%

Year	Pop.	±%
1980	136,210	+4.9%
1991	136,150	−0.0%
2001	138,247	+1.5%
2011	136,760	−1.1%
2021	133,348	−2.5%

Source: Censuses

=== Most populous municipalities ===
Name	Population	Area (km^{2})
Česká Třebová	14,982	41
Ústí nad Orlicí	13,988	36
Vysoké Mýto	12,849	42
Lanškroun	9,845	21
Choceň	8,700	22
Letohrad	6,345	24
Žamberk	5,770	17
Králíky	4,042	53
Jablonné nad Orlicí	3,085	4
Červená Voda	2,927	47

== Economy ==
The largest employers with headquarters in Ústí nad Orlicí District and at least 500 employees are:

Economic entity	Location	Number of employees	Main activity
Iveco Czech Republic	Vysoké Mýto	3,000–3,999	Manufacture of motor vehicles
Kyocera AVX Component	Lanškroun	1,500–1,999	Manufacture of electronic components
OEZ	Letohrad	1,500–1,999	Manufacture of electricity distribution and control apparatus
Schaeffler Production CZ	Lanškroun	1,000–1,499	Manufacture of rolling element bearings
COOP Konzum, družstvo	Ústí nad Orlicí	1,000–1,499	Retail trade
CZ LOKO	Česká Třebová	500–999	Manufacture and repair of rolling stock
Autoneum CZ	Choceň	500–999	Manufacture of automotive parts
Sněžník	Dolní Morava	500–999	Sports facility operation
Schott CR	Lanškroun	500–999	Manufacture of electronic components
SOR Libchavy	Libchavy	500–999	Manufacture of motor vehicles
Pekařství a cukrářství Sázava	Sázava	500–999	Food industry
Rieter CZ	Ústí nad Orlicí	500–999	Manufacture of textile machinery

== Transport ==
There are no motorways passing through the district. The most important road is the I/35 road (part of the European route E442), which replaces the unfinished section of the D35 motorway from Olomouc to the Hradec Králové Region.

== Sights ==
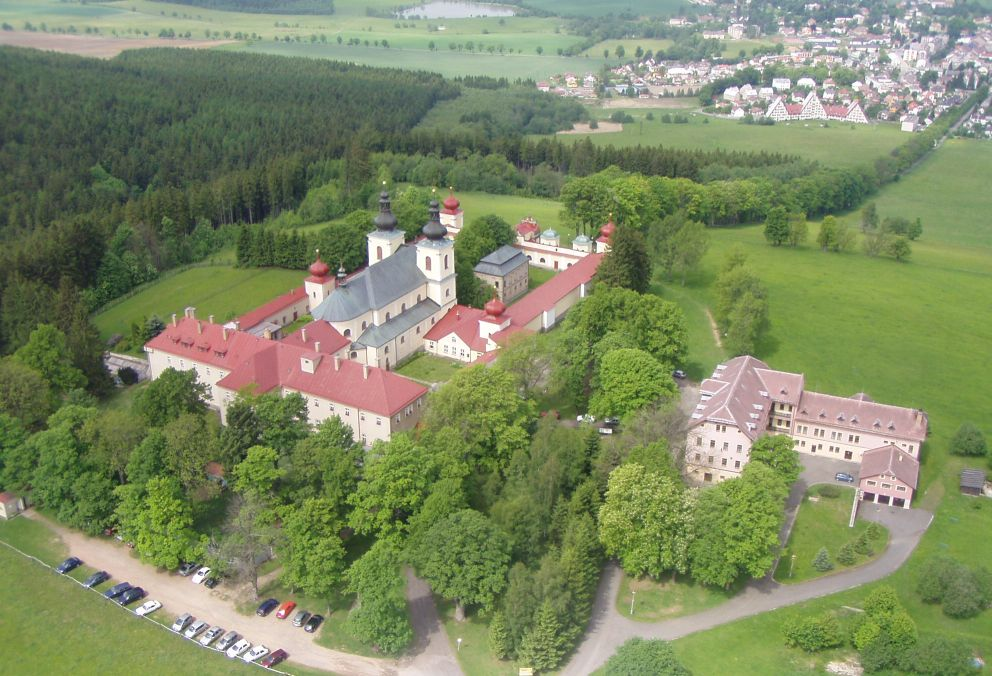
Hora Matky Boží Monastery

The most important monuments in the district, protected as national cultural monuments, are:

- Theatre in Ústí nad Orlicí
- Hora Matky Boží pilgrimage site in Králíky with the Church of the Assumption of the Virgin Mary

The best-preserved settlements, protected as monument zones, are:

- Brandýs nad Orlicí
- Česká Třebová
- Jablonné nad Orlicí
- Králíky
- Lanškroun
- Letohrad
- Ústí nad Orlicí
- Vysoké Mýto
- Žamberk
- Vysoká

The most visited tourist destinations of the entire Pardubice Region are located Dolní Morava within Ústí nad Orlicí District: Sky Bridge 721, Sky Walk Observation Tower, and Mammoth Alpine Coaster bobsleigh track.
