= Stradouň =

- Municipality
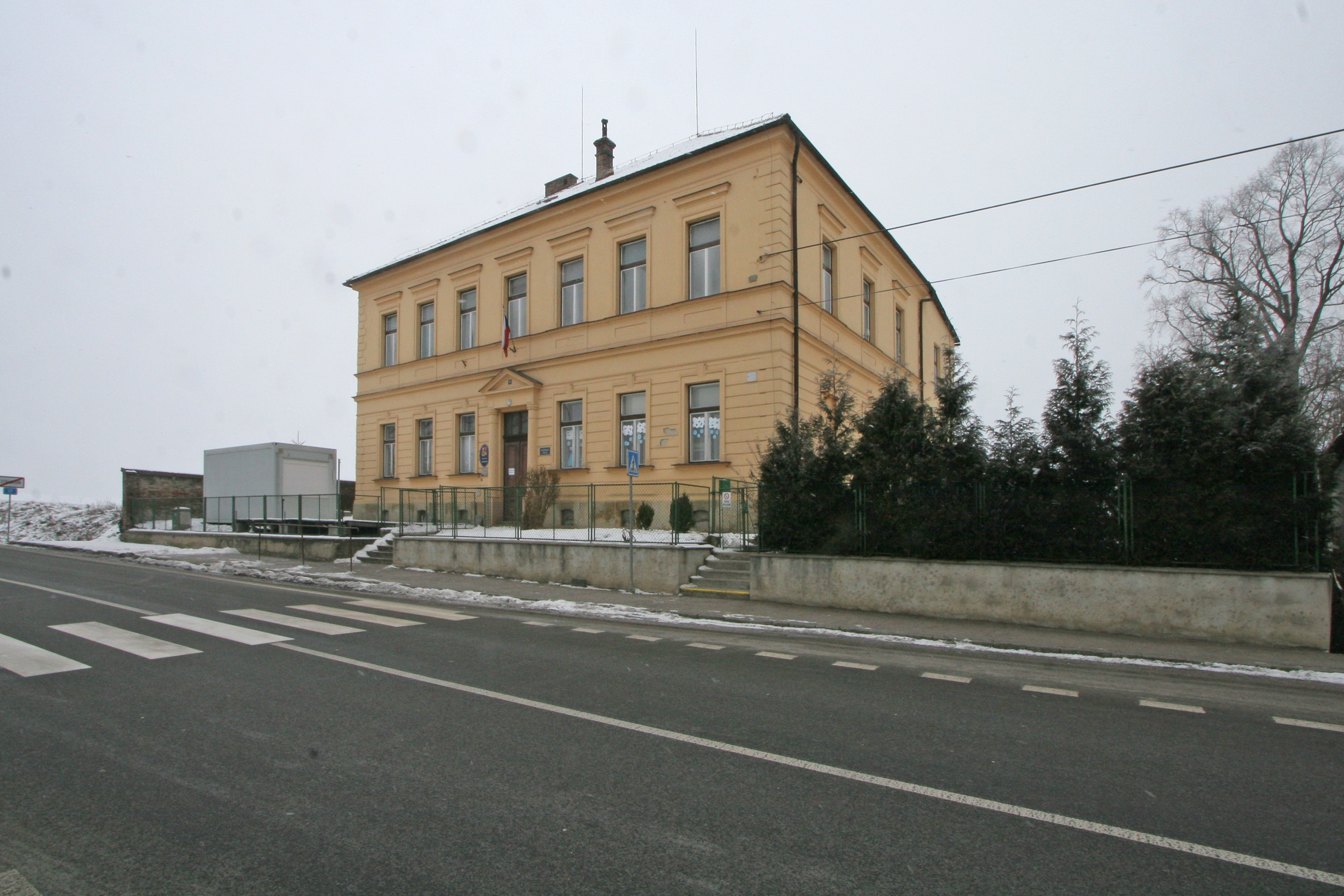
- Municipal office

- Location in the Czech Republic
- Coordinates: 49°58′21″N 16°3′56″E
- Country: Czech Republic
- Region: Pardubice
- District: Ústí nad Orlicí
- First mentioned: 1160

Area
  - Total: 5.14 km^{2} (1.98 sq mi)
- Elevation: 254 m (833 ft)

Population (2026-01-01)
  - Total: 187
  - Density: 36.4/km^{2} (94.2/sq mi)
- Time zone: UTC+1 (CET)
  - Summer (DST): UTC+2 (CEST)
- Postal code: 538 63
- Website: www.stradoun.cz

Stradouň is a municipality and village in Ústí nad Orlicí District in the Pardubice Region of the Czech Republic. It has about 200 inhabitants.

== Demographics ==
Historical population
Year	Pop.	±%
1869	497	—
1880	533	+7.2%
1890	516	−3.2%
1900	513	−0.6%
1910	510	−0.6%
1921	500	−2.0%
1930	468	−6.4%
1950	323	−31.0%
1961	312	−3.4%
1970	274	−12.2%
1980	222	−19.0%
1991	179	−19.4%
2001	163	−8.9%
2011	198	+21.5%
2021	183	−7.6%
Source: Censuses
