= Trpík =

- Municipality
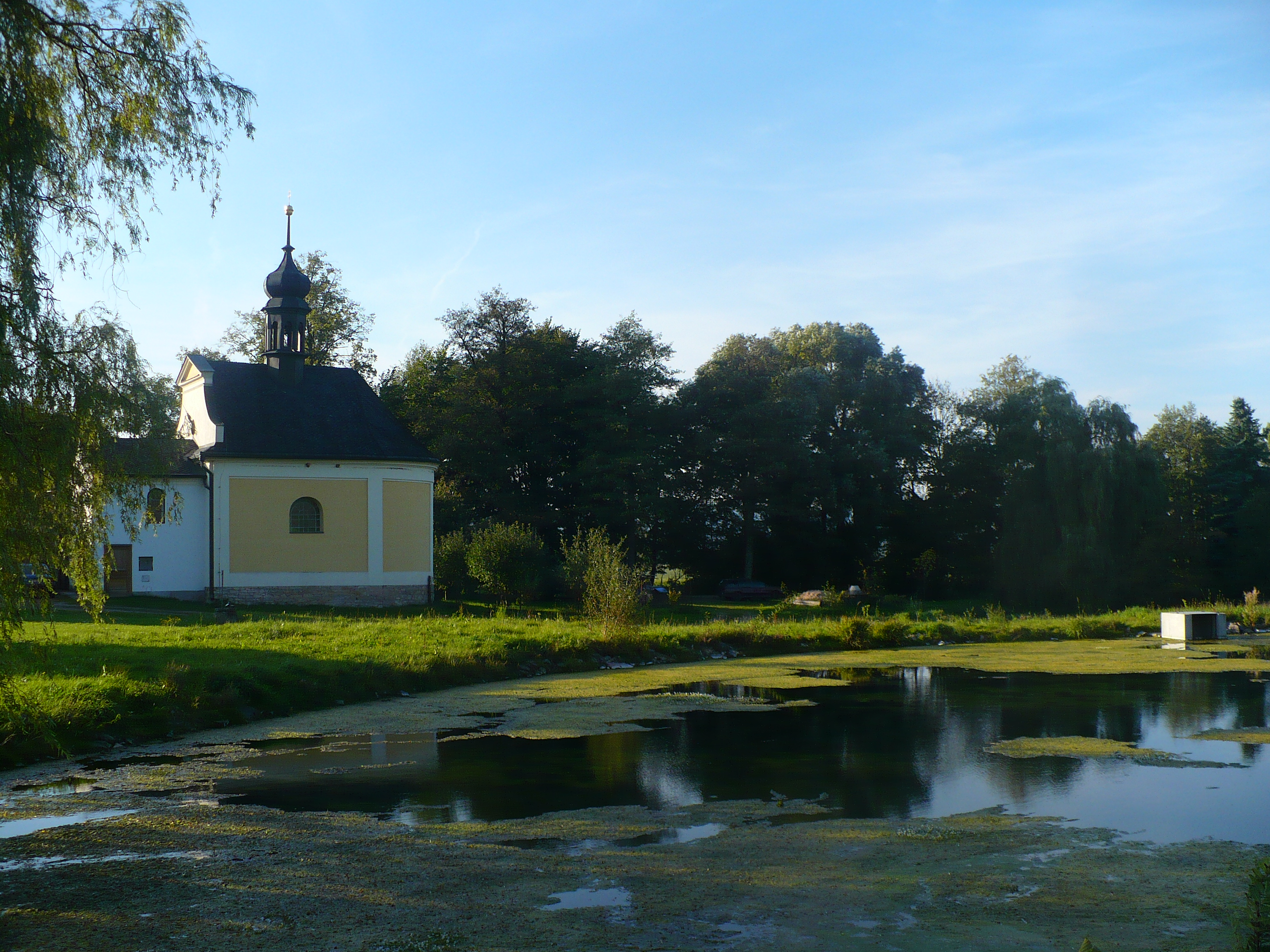
- Centre of Trpík with the Chapel of Saint Anne

- Flag Coat of arms

- Location in the Czech Republic
- Coordinates: 49°50′51″N 16°34′12″E
- Country: Czech Republic
- Region: Pardubice
- District: Ústí nad Orlicí
- First mentioned: 1304

Area
  - Total: 3.59 km^{2} (1.39 sq mi)
- Elevation: 368 m (1,207 ft)

Population (2026-01-01)
  - Total: 85
  - Density: 24/km^{2} (61/sq mi)
- Time zone: UTC+1 (CET)
  - Summer (DST): UTC+2 (CEST)
- Postal code: 563 01
- Website: www.trpik.cz

Trpík (German: Türpes) is a municipality and village in Ústí nad Orlicí District in the Pardubice Region of the Czech Republic. It has about 90 inhabitants.

Trpík lies approximately 20 kilometres (12 mi) south-east of Ústí nad Orlicí, 61 km (38 mi) east of Pardubice, and 157 km (98 mi) east of Prague.

== Demographics ==
Historical population
| Year | Pop. | ±% |
|---|---|---|
| 1869 | 326 | — |
| 1880 | 310 | −4.9% |
| 1890 | 314 | +1.3% |
| 1900 | 286 | −8.9% |
| 1910 | 261 | −8.7% |
| 1921 | 266 | +1.9% |
| 1930 | 239 | −10.2% |
| 1950 | 130 | −45.6% |
| 1961 | 113 | −13.1% |
| 1970 | 104 | −8.0% |
| 1980 | 78 | −25.0% |
| 1991 | 70 | −10.3% |
| 2001 | 66 | −5.7% |
| 2011 | 63 | −4.5% |
| 2021 | 91 | +44.4% |
Source: Censuses
