= Šedivec =

- Municipality
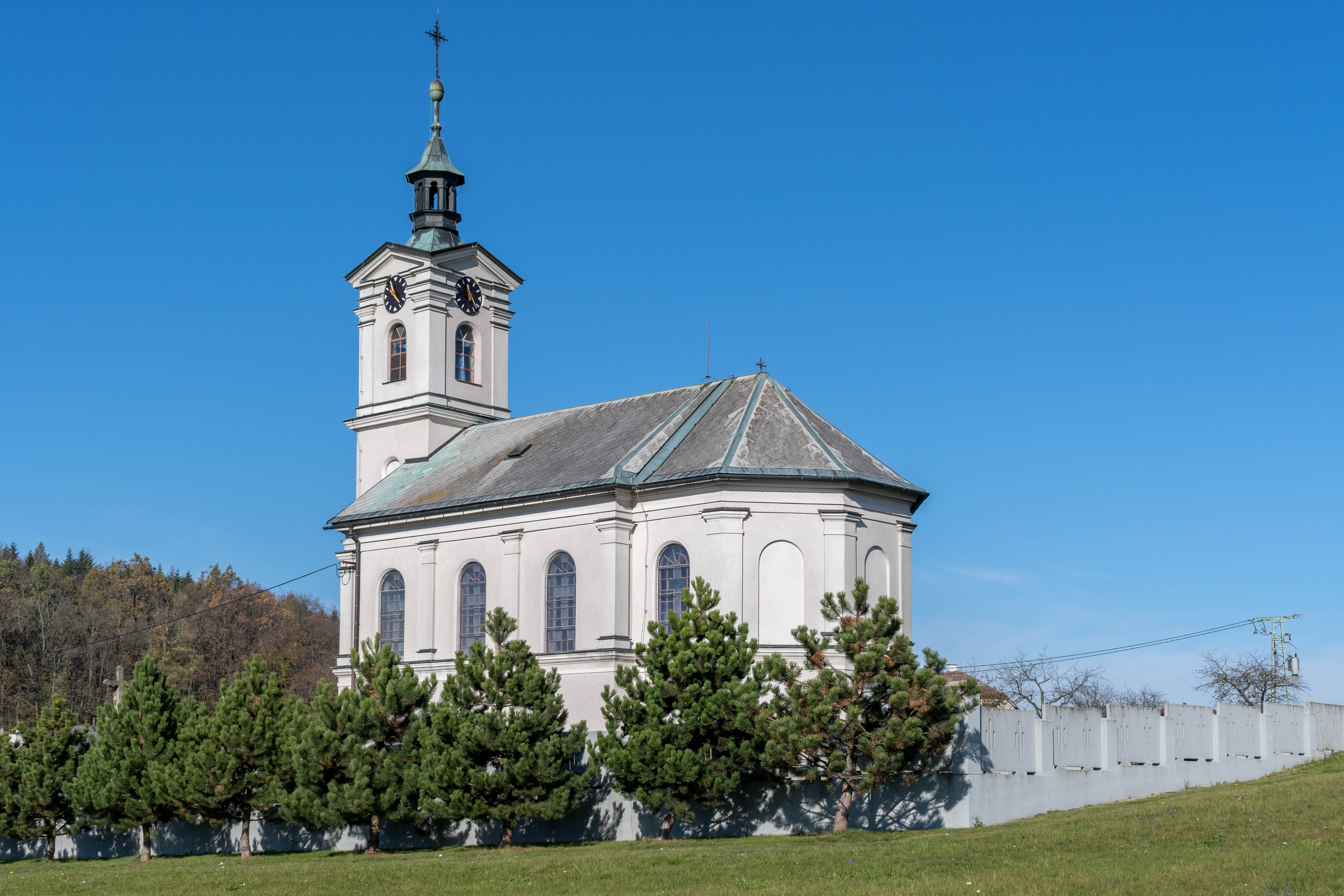
- Church of the Assumption of the Virgin Mary

- Flag Coat of arms

- Location in the Czech Republic
- Coordinates: 50°2′52″N 16°32′9″E
- Country: Czech Republic
- Region: Pardubice
- District: Ústí nad Orlicí
- First mentioned: 1539

Area
  - Total: 3.87 km^{2} (1.49 sq mi)
- Elevation: 470 m (1,540 ft)

Population (2026-01-01)
  - Total: 212
  - Density: 54.8/km^{2} (142/sq mi)
- Time zone: UTC+1 (CET)
  - Summer (DST): UTC+2 (CEST)
- Postal code: 564 01
- Website: www.obecsedivec.cz

Šedivec (German: Schedowilz) is a municipality and village in Ústí nad Orlicí District in the Pardubice Region of the Czech Republic. It has about 200 inhabitants.

Šedivec lies approximately 13 kilometres (8 mi) north-east of Ústí nad Orlicí, 54 km (34 mi) east of Pardubice, and 152 km (94 mi) east of Prague.

== Demographics ==
Historical population
Year	Pop.	±%
1869	293	—
1880	319	+8.9%
1890	326	+2.2%
1900	322	−1.2%
1910	296	−8.1%
1921	268	−9.5%
1930	241	−10.1%
1950	204	−15.4%
1961	211	+3.4%
1970	203	−3.8%
1980	181	−10.8%
1991	205	+13.3%
2001	210	+2.4%
2011	206	−1.9%
2021	195	−5.3%
Source: Censuses
