= Velká Skrovnice =

- Municipality
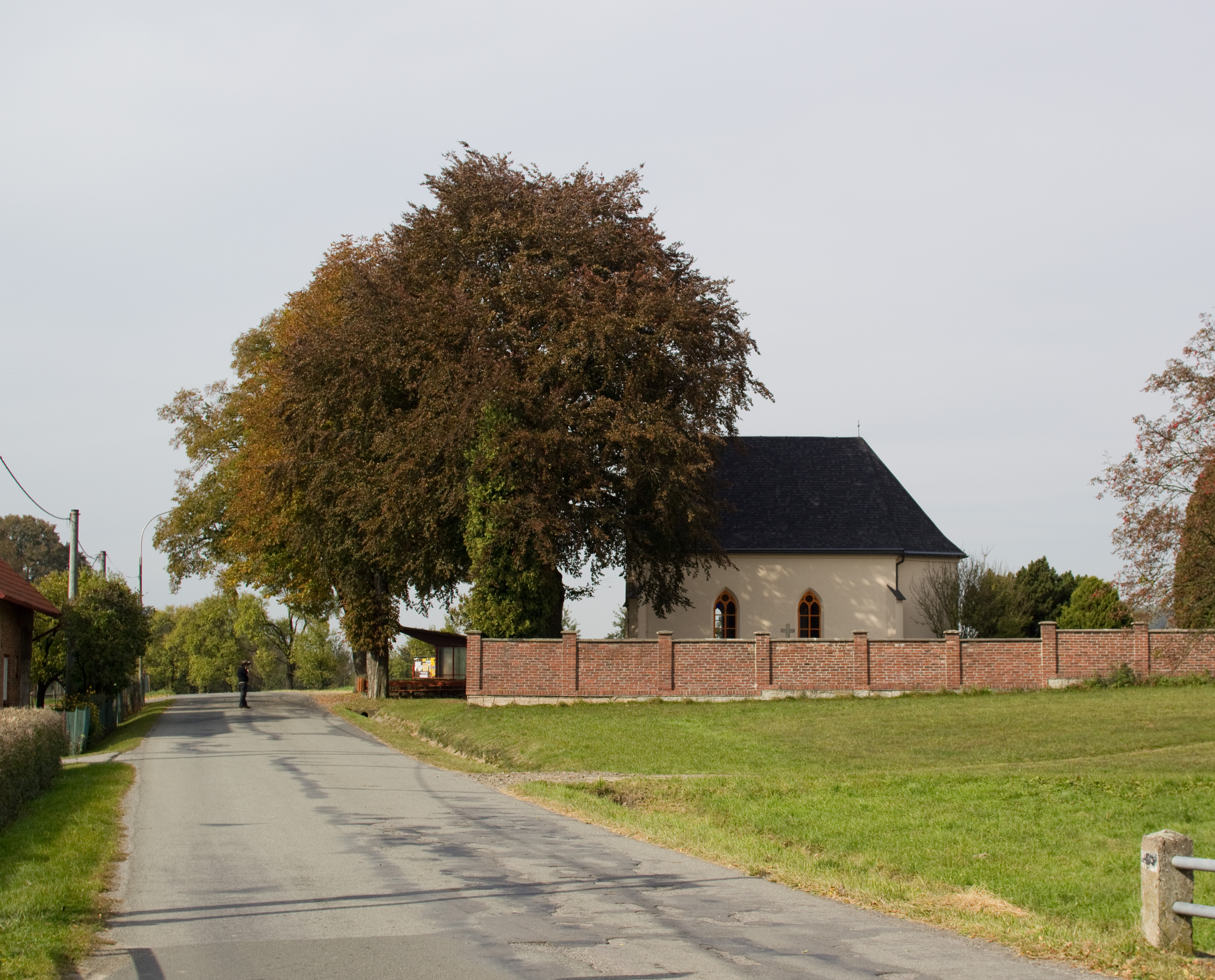
- Church of Saints Cyril and Methodius

- Coat of arms

- Location in the Czech Republic
- Coordinates: 50°1′50″N 16°19′1″E
- Country: Czech Republic
- Region: Pardubice
- District: Ústí nad Orlicí
- First mentioned: 1349

Area
  - Total: 5.75 km^{2} (2.22 sq mi)
- Elevation: 415 m (1,362 ft)

Population (2026-01-01)
  - Total: 295
  - Density: 51.3/km^{2} (133/sq mi)
- Time zone: UTC+1 (CET)
  - Summer (DST): UTC+2 (CEST)
- Postal code: 562 01
- Website: www.velkaskrovnice.cz

Velká Skrovnice is a municipality and village in Ústí nad Orlicí District in the Pardubice Region of the Czech Republic. It has about 300 inhabitants.

Velká Skrovnice lies approximately 9 kilometres (6 mi) north-west of Ústí nad Orlicí, 40 km (25 mi) east of Pardubice, and 137 km (85 mi) east of Prague.

== Administrative division ==
Velká Skrovnice consists of two municipal parts (in brackets population according to the 2021 census):

- Velká Skrovnice (228)
- Malá Skrovnice (28)

== Demographics ==
Historical population
Year	Pop.	±%
1869	598	—
1880	644	+7.7%
1890	612	−5.0%
1900	546	−10.8%
1910	531	−2.7%
1921	524	−1.3%
1930	462	−11.8%
1950	331	−28.4%
1961	300	−9.4%
1970	288	−4.0%
1980	291	+1.0%
1991	299	+2.7%
2001	287	−4.0%
2011	261	−9.1%
2021	256	−1.9%
Source: Censuses
