= Javorník (Ústí nad Orlicí District) =

- Municipality
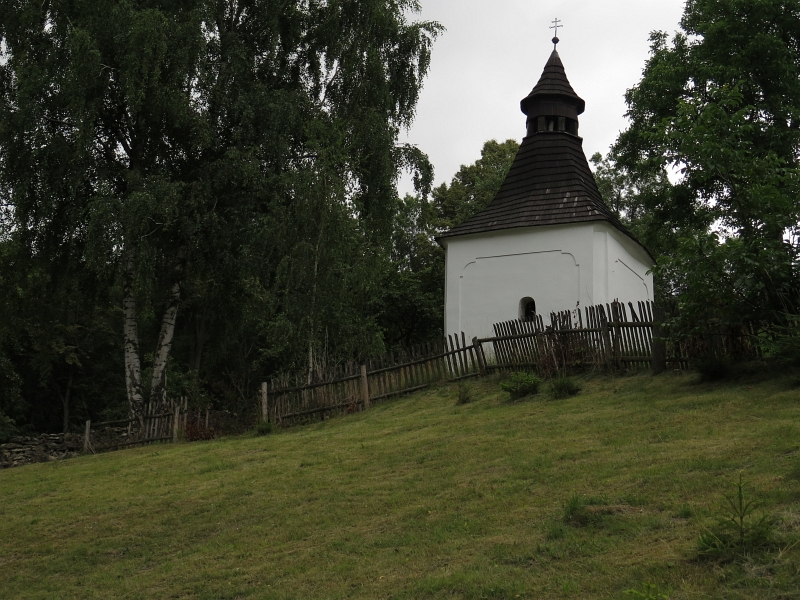
- Belfry

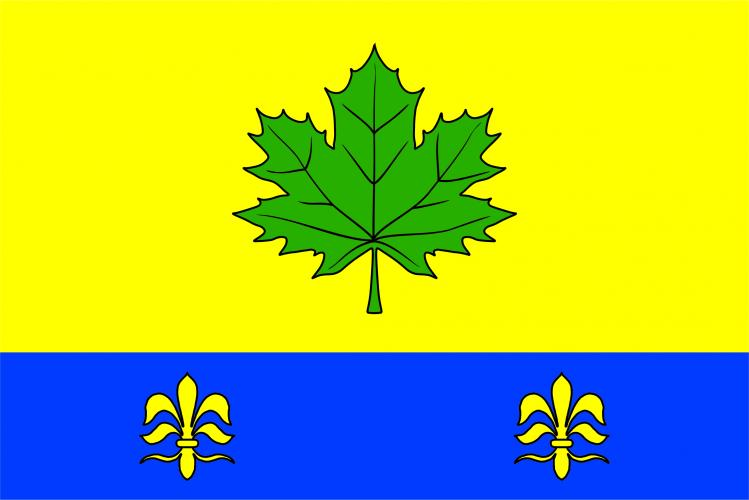
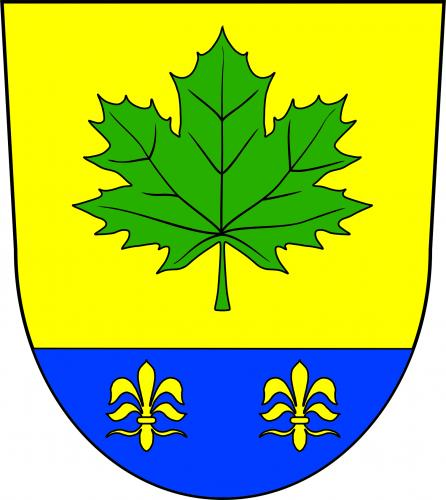
- Flag Coat of arms

- Location in the Czech Republic
- Coordinates: 49°53′22″N 16°9′22″E
- Country: Czech Republic
- Region: Pardubice
- District: Ústí nad Orlicí
- First mentioned: 1347

Area
  - Total: 5.48 km^{2} (2.12 sq mi)
- Elevation: 410 m (1,350 ft)

Population (2026-01-01)
  - Total: 243
  - Density: 44.3/km^{2} (115/sq mi)
- Time zone: UTC+1 (CET)
  - Summer (DST): UTC+2 (CEST)
- Postal code: 566 01
- Website: www.obecjavornik.eu

Javorník (Czech pronunciation: [ˈjavorɲiːk]) is a municipality and village in Ústí nad Orlicí District in the Pardubice Region of the Czech Republic. It has about 200 inhabitants.

== Administrative division ==
Javorník consists of two municipal parts (in brackets population according to the 2021 census):

- Javorník (236)
- Vysoká (10)

== Demographics ==
Historical population
Year	Pop.	±%
1869	676	—
1880	656	−3.0%
1890	670	+2.1%
1900	740	+10.4%
1910	694	−6.2%
1921	701	+1.0%
1930	655	−6.6%
1950	504	−23.1%
1961	488	−3.2%
1970	370	−24.2%
1980	325	−12.2%
1991	264	−18.8%
2001	251	−4.9%
2011	247	−1.6%
2021	246	−0.4%
Source: Censuses
