= Česká Rybná =

- Municipality
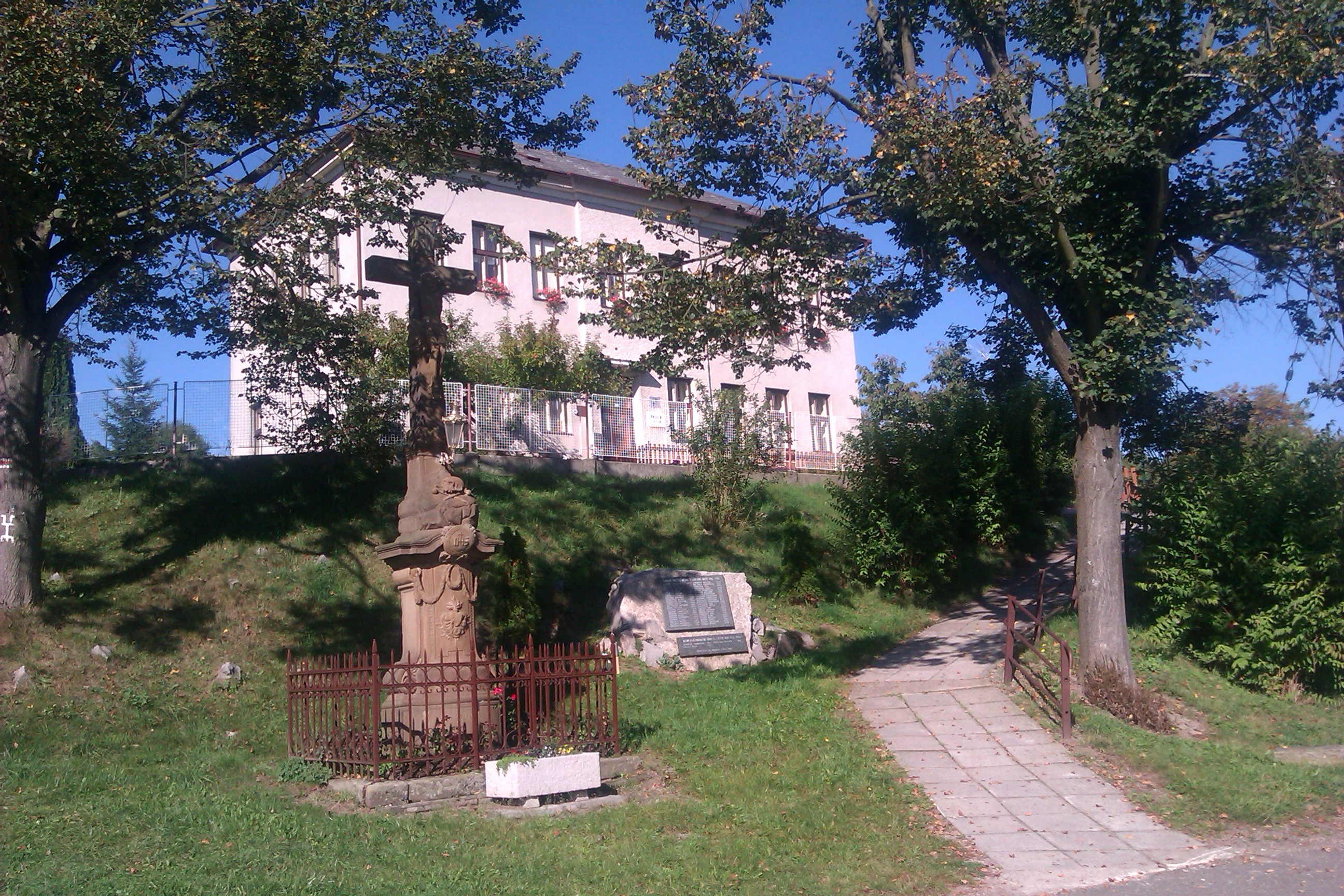
- Primary school

- Flag Coat of arms

- Location in the Czech Republic
- Coordinates: 50°4′19″N 16°23′32″E
- Country: Czech Republic
- Region: Pardubice
- District: Ústí nad Orlicí
- First mentioned: 1495

Area
  - Total: 8.09 km^{2} (3.12 sq mi)
- Elevation: 435 m (1,427 ft)

Population (2026-01-01)
  - Total: 371
  - Density: 45.9/km^{2} (119/sq mi)
- Time zone: UTC+1 (CET)
  - Summer (DST): UTC+2 (CEST)
- Postal code: 561 85
- Website: www.ceska-rybna.cz

Česká Rybná (German: Böhmisch Rybna) is a municipality and village in Ústí nad Orlicí District in the Pardubice Region of the Czech Republic. It has about 400 inhabitants.

== Demographics ==
Historical population
Year	Pop.	±%
1869	814	—
1880	757	−7.0%
1890	883	+16.6%
1900	901	+2.0%
1910	821	−8.9%
1921	798	−2.8%
1930	733	−8.1%
1950	624	−14.9%
1961	562	−9.9%
1970	483	−14.1%
1980	403	−16.6%
1991	342	−15.1%
2001	376	+9.9%
2011	406	+8.0%
2021	373	−8.1%
Source: Censuses
