= Zádolí =

- Municipality
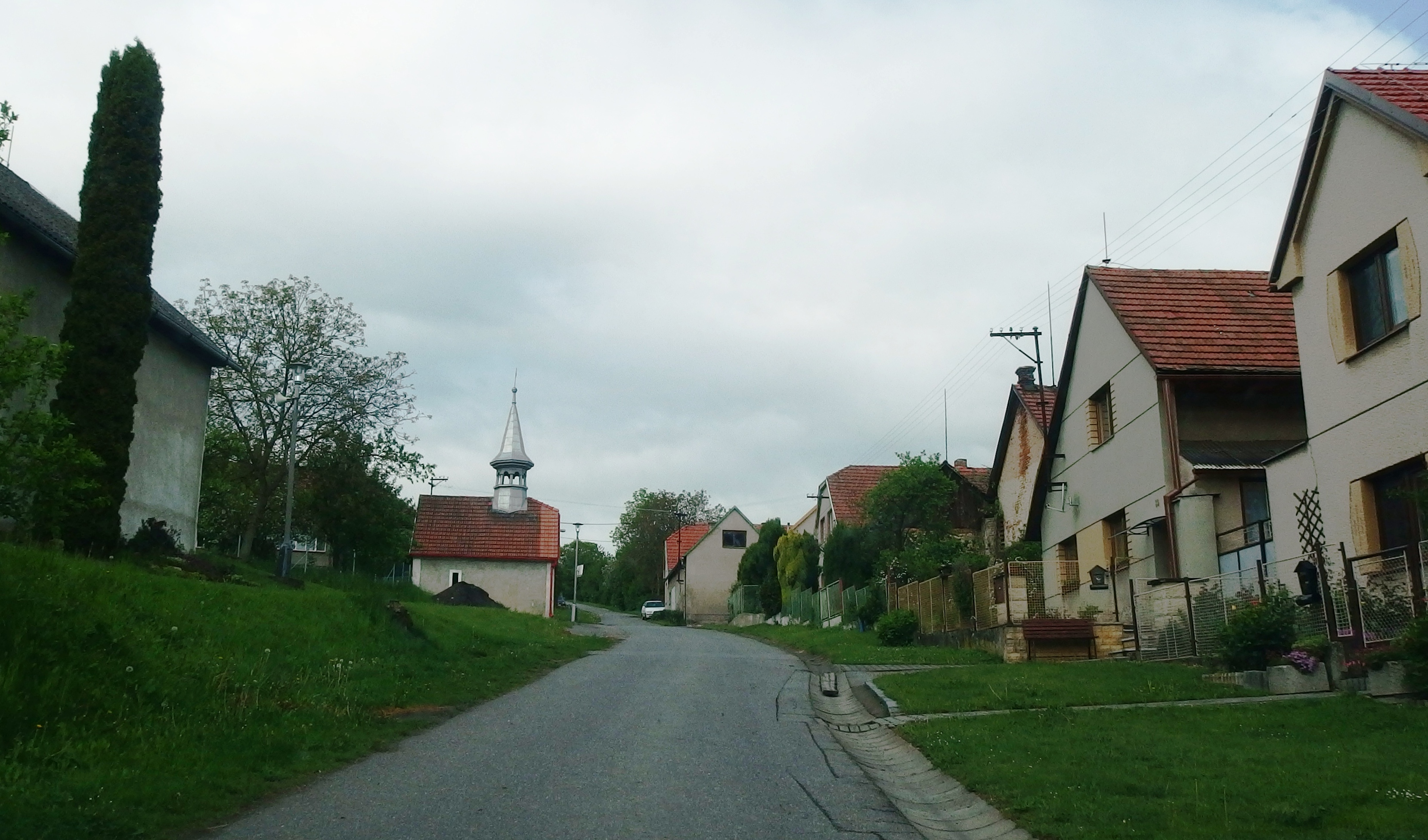
- Main street

- Location in the Czech Republic
- Coordinates: 49°54′11″N 16°7′38″E
- Country: Czech Republic
- Region: Pardubice
- District: Ústí nad Orlicí
- First mentioned: 1461

Area
  - Total: 4.26 km^{2} (1.64 sq mi)
- Elevation: 412 m (1,352 ft)

Population (2026-01-01)
  - Total: 87
  - Density: 20/km^{2} (53/sq mi)
- Time zone: UTC+1 (CET)
  - Summer (DST): UTC+2 (CEST)
- Postal code: 566 01
- Website: www.zadoli-strihanov.cz

Zádolí is a municipality and village in Ústí nad Orlicí District in the Pardubice Region of the Czech Republic. It has about 90 inhabitants.

Zádolí lies approximately 22 km (14 mi) west of Ústí nad Orlicí, 29 km (18 mi) southeast of Pardubice, and 124 km (77 mi) east of Prague.

== Administrative division ==
Zádolí consists of two municipal parts (in brackets population according to the 2021 census):

- Zádolí (52)
- Střihanov (40)

== Demographics ==
Historical population
Year	Pop.	±%
1869	332	—
1880	311	−6.3%
1890	296	−4.8%
1900	259	−12.5%
1910	245	−5.4%
1921	278	+13.5%
1930	254	−8.6%
1950	225	−11.4%
1961	188	−16.4%
1970	158	−16.0%
1980	118	−25.3%
1991	103	−12.7%
2001	91	−11.7%
2011	91	+0.0%
2021	92	+1.1%
Source: Censuses
