= Hrušová =

- Municipality
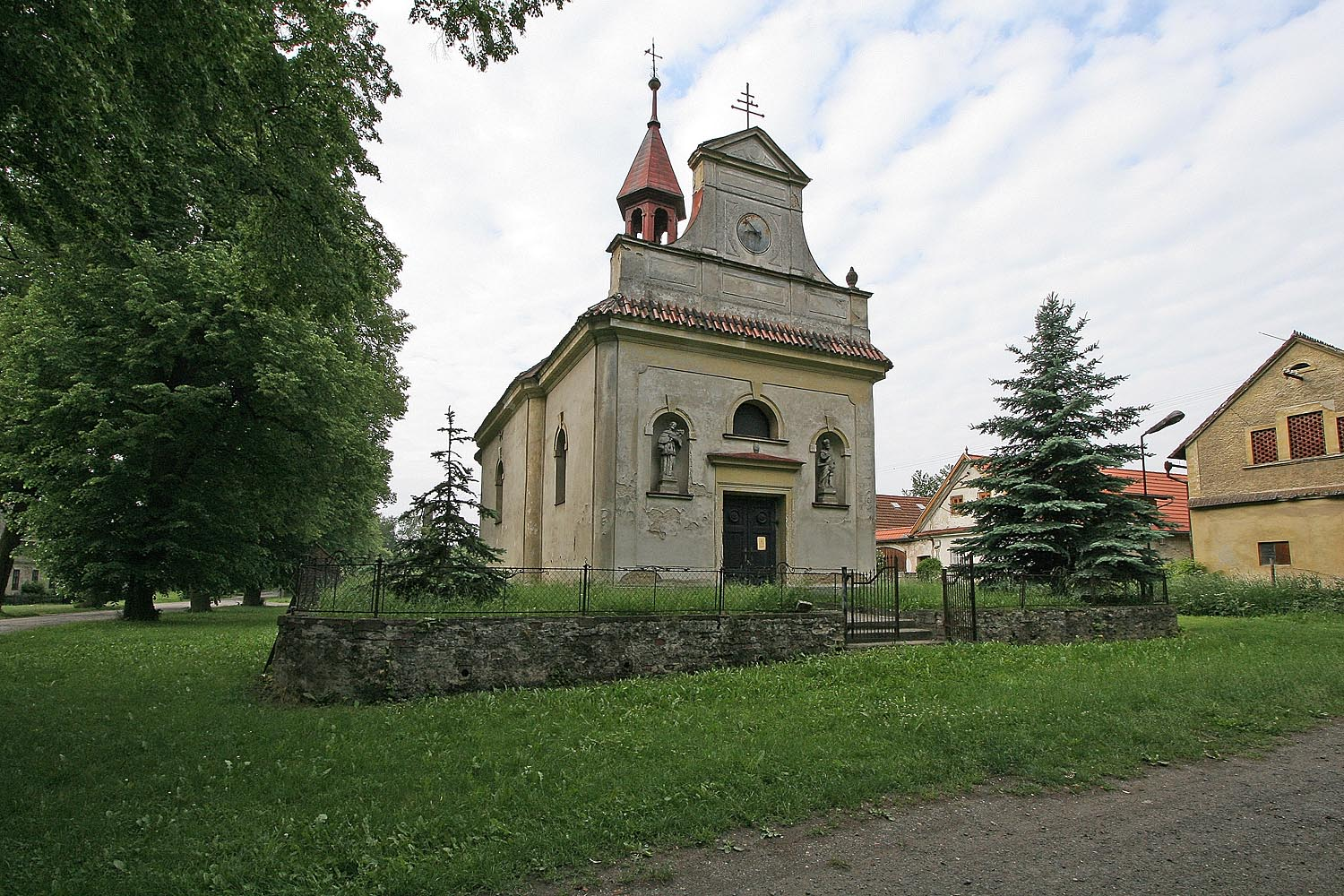
- Church of the Holy Trinity

- Location in the Czech Republic
- Coordinates: 49°54′49″N 16°11′52″E
- Country: Czech Republic
- Region: Pardubice
- District: Ústí nad Orlicí
- First mentioned: 1167

Area
  - Total: 6.08 km^{2} (2.35 sq mi)
- Elevation: 286 m (938 ft)

Population (2026-01-01)
  - Total: 397
  - Density: 65.3/km^{2} (169/sq mi)
- Time zone: UTC+1 (CET)
  - Summer (DST): UTC+2 (CEST)
- Postal code: 565 55
- Website: hrusova.cz

Hrušová (German: Kruschau) is a municipality and village in Ústí nad Orlicí District in the Pardubice Region of the Czech Republic. It has about 400 inhabitants.

== Demographics ==
Historical population
Year	Pop.	±%
1869	486	—
1880	567	+16.7%
1890	551	−2.8%
1900	504	−8.5%
1910	533	+5.8%
1921	548	+2.8%
1930	671	+22.4%
1950	452	−32.6%
1961	434	−4.0%
1970	378	−12.9%
1980	358	−5.3%
1991	321	−10.3%
2001	312	−2.8%
2011	322	+3.2%
2021	368	+14.3%
Source: Censuses
