= Seč (Ústí nad Orlicí District) =

- Municipality
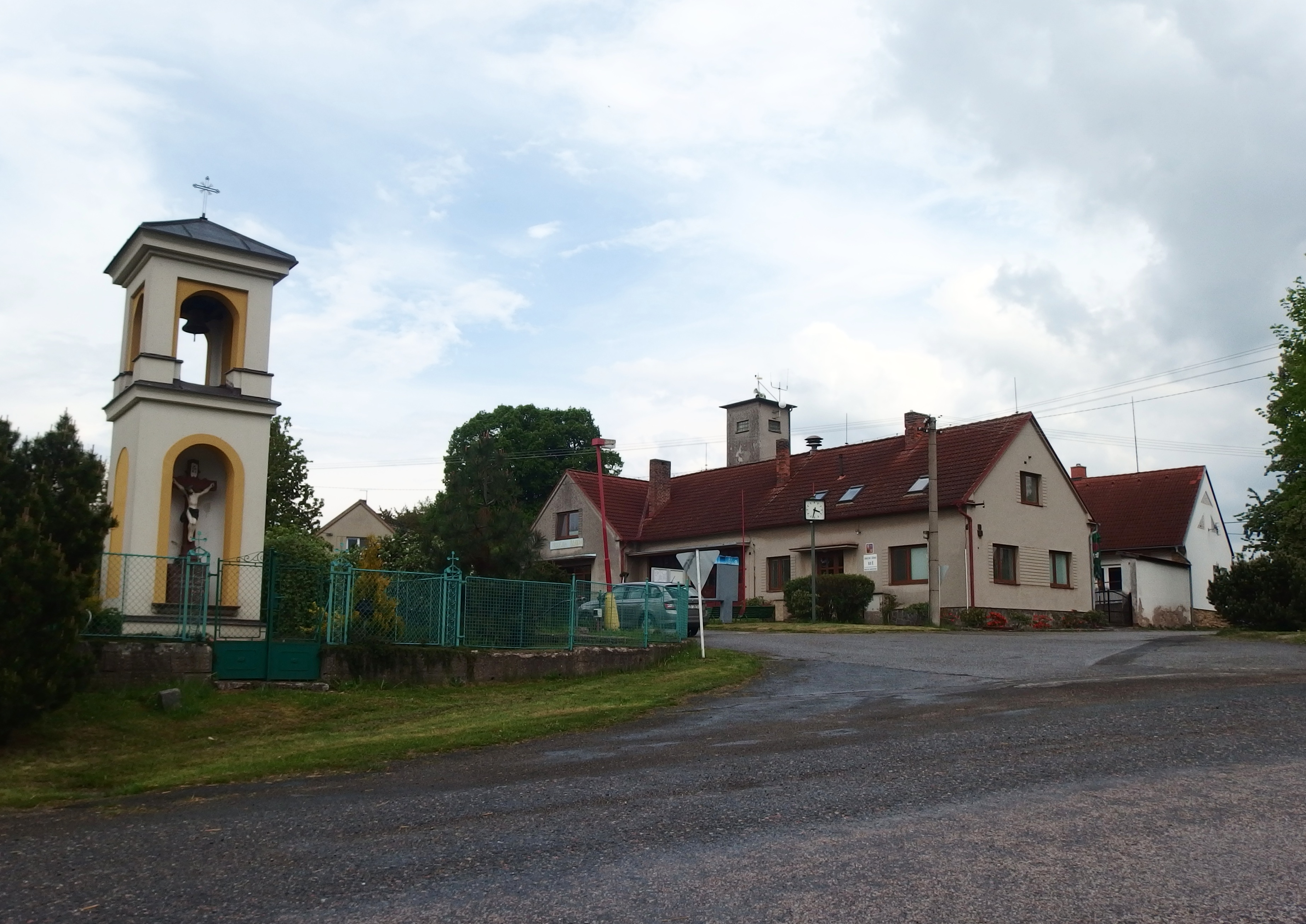
- Centre of Seč with a belfry and municipal office

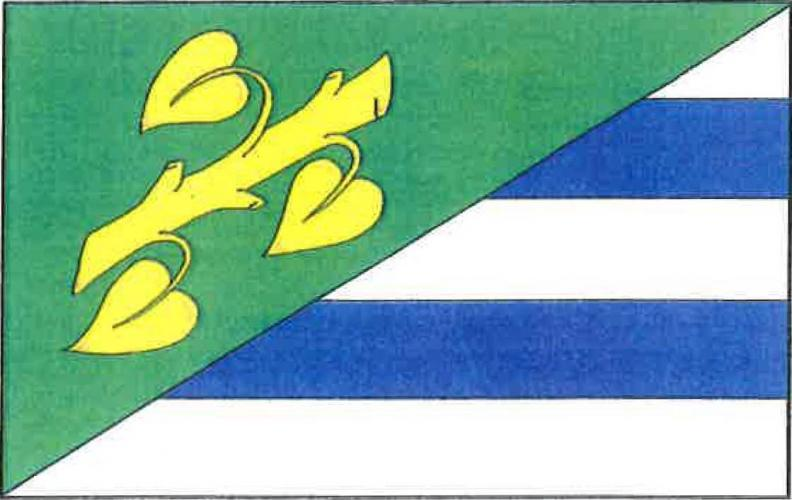
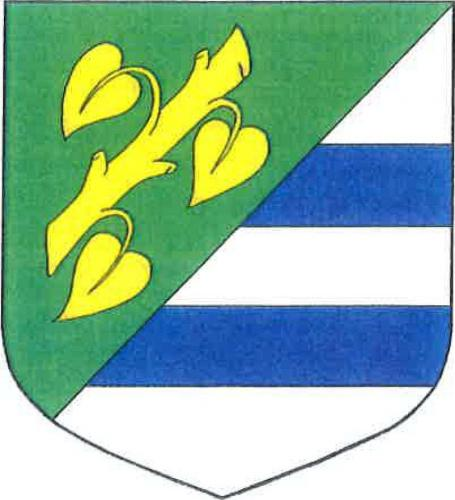
- Flag Coat of arms

- Location in the Czech Republic
- Coordinates: 50°1′32″N 16°17′42″E
- Country: Czech Republic
- Region: Pardubice
- District: Ústí nad Orlicí
- First mentioned: 1397

Area
  - Total: 2.43 km^{2} (0.94 sq mi)
- Elevation: 426 m (1,398 ft)

Population (2026-01-01)
  - Total: 159
  - Density: 65.4/km^{2} (169/sq mi)
- Time zone: UTC+1 (CET)
  - Summer (DST): UTC+2 (CEST)
- Postal code: 562 01
- Website: obecsec.cz

Seč is a municipality and village in Ústí nad Orlicí District in the Pardubice Region of the Czech Republic. It has about 200 inhabitants.

Seč lies approximately 10 kilometres (6 mi) north-west of Ústí nad Orlicí, 38 km (24 mi) east of Pardubice, and 135 km (84 mi) east of Prague.

== Demographics ==
Historical population
Year	Pop.	±%
1869	254	—
1880	227	−10.6%
1890	206	−9.3%
1900	193	−6.3%
1910	207	+7.3%
1921	203	−1.9%
1930	190	−6.4%
1950	156	−17.9%
1961	157	+0.6%
1970	171	+8.9%
1980	163	−4.7%
1991	154	−5.5%
2001	136	−11.7%
2011	149	+9.6%
2021	144	−3.4%
Source: Censuses
