= Týnišťko =

- Municipality
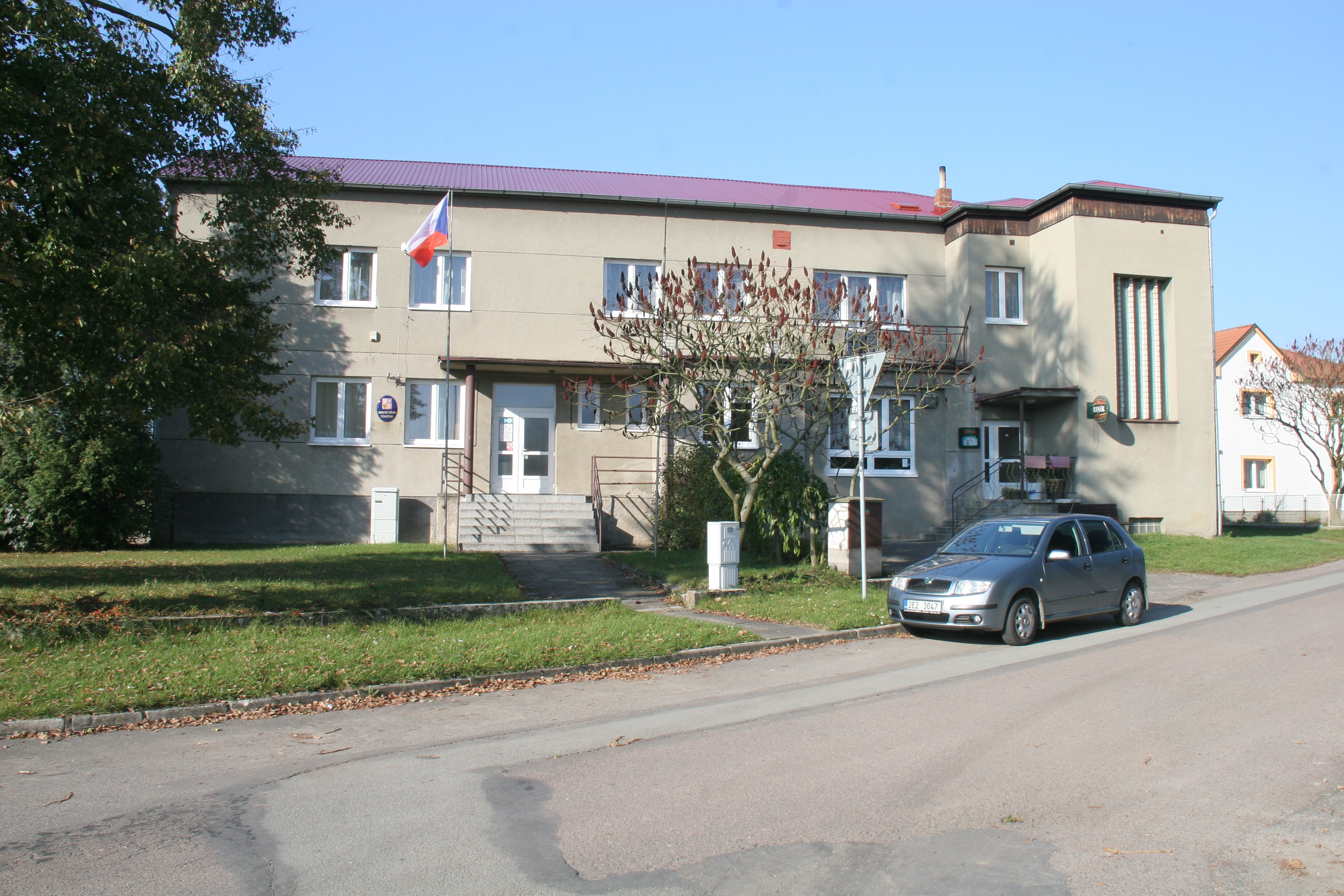
- Municipal office

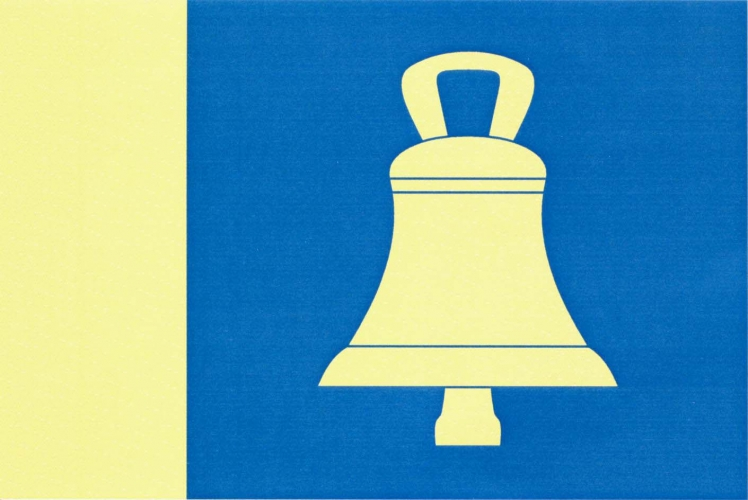
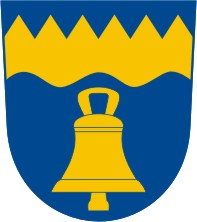
- Flag Coat of arms

- Location in the Czech Republic
- Coordinates: 49°59′56″N 16°5′50″E
- Country: Czech Republic
- Region: Pardubice
- District: Ústí nad Orlicí
- First mentioned: 1334

Area
  - Total: 4.11 km^{2} (1.59 sq mi)
- Elevation: 262 m (860 ft)

Population (2026-01-01)
  - Total: 161
  - Density: 39.2/km^{2} (101/sq mi)
- Time zone: UTC+1 (CET)
  - Summer (DST): UTC+2 (CEST)
- Postal code: 566 01
- Website: www.tynistko.cz

Týnišťko (German: Tinisko) is a municipality and village in Ústí nad Orlicí District in the Pardubice Region of the Czech Republic. It has about 200 inhabitants.

== Demographics ==
Historical population
| Year | Pop. | ±% |
|---|---|---|
| 1869 | 292 | — |
| 1880 | 304 | +4.1% |
| 1890 | 305 | +0.3% |
| 1900 | 319 | +4.6% |
| 1910 | 298 | −6.6% |
| 1921 | 276 | −7.4% |
| 1930 | 291 | +5.4% |
| 1950 | 252 | −13.4% |
| 1961 | 247 | −2.0% |
| 1970 | 242 | −2.0% |
| 1980 | 179 | −26.0% |
| 1991 | 173 | −3.4% |
| 2001 | 169 | −2.3% |
| 2011 | 151 | −10.7% |
| 2021 | 152 | +0.7% |
Source: Censuses
