= Vinary (Ústí nad Orlicí District) =

- Municipality
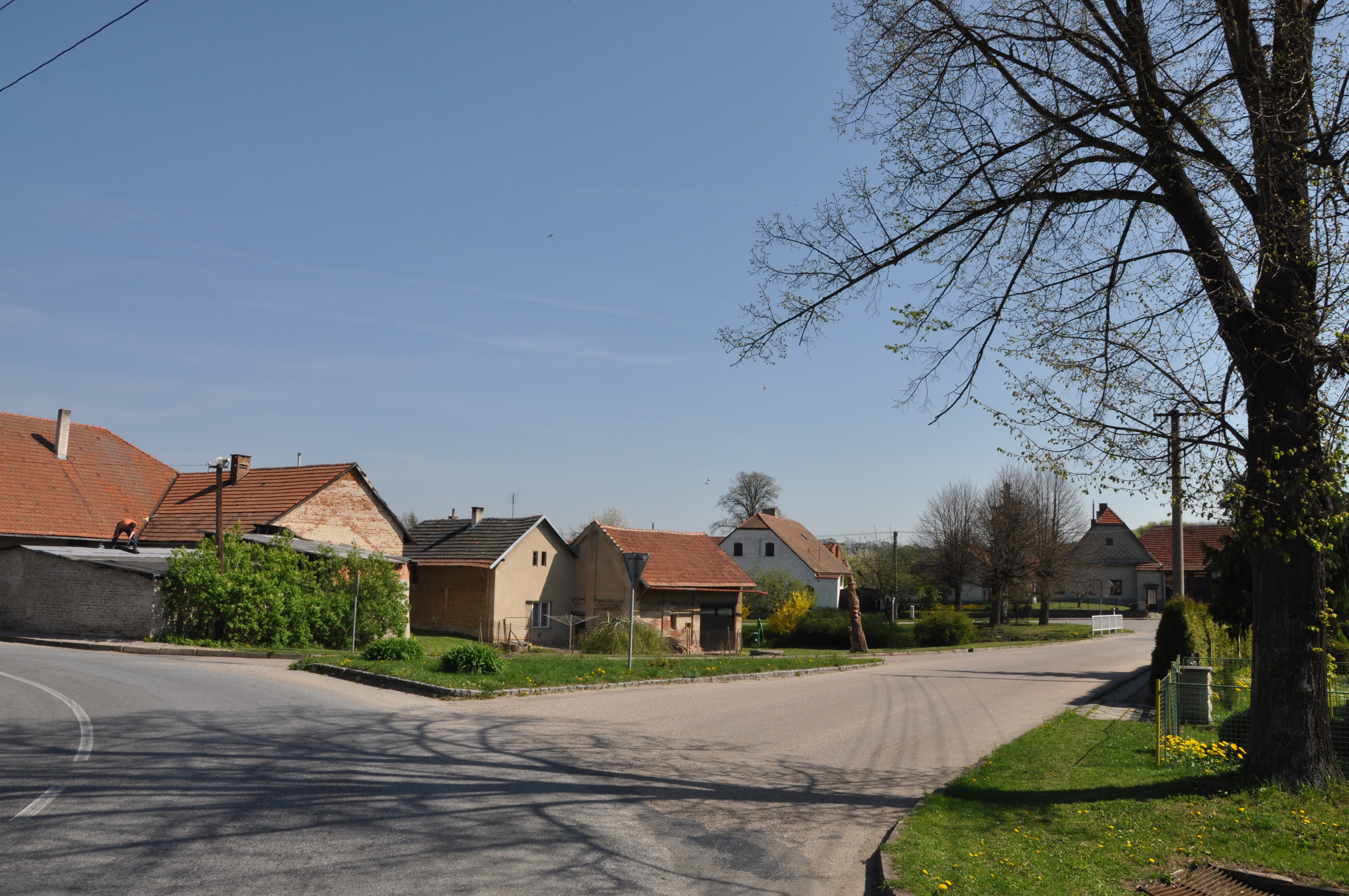
- Centre of Vinary

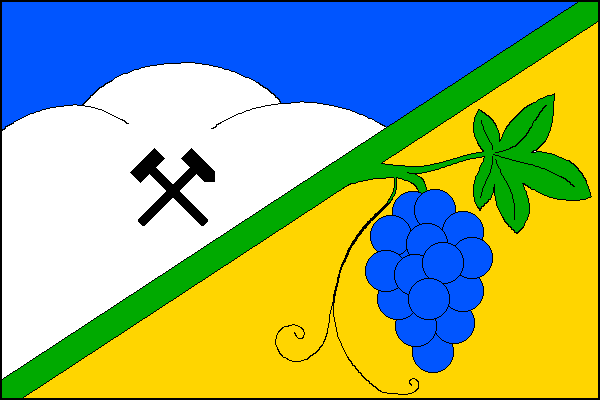
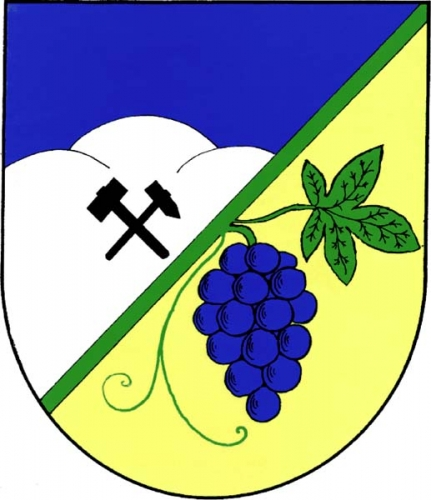
- Flag Coat of arms

- Location in the Czech Republic
- Coordinates: 49°57′33″N 16°3′37″E
- Country: Czech Republic
- Region: Pardubice
- District: Ústí nad Orlicí
- First mentioned: 1433

Area
  - Total: 3.47 km^{2} (1.34 sq mi)
- Elevation: 272 m (892 ft)

Population (2026-01-01)
  - Total: 136
  - Density: 39.2/km^{2} (102/sq mi)
- Time zone: UTC+1 (CET)
  - Summer (DST): UTC+2 (CEST)
- Postal code: 538 63
- Website: www.obecvinary.cz

Vinary is a municipality and village in Ústí nad Orlicí District in the Pardubice Region of the Czech Republic. It has about 100 inhabitants.

== Demographics ==
Historical population
Year	Pop.	±%
1869	380	—
1880	395	+3.9%
1890	402	+1.8%
1900	339	−15.7%
1910	313	−7.7%
1921	305	−2.6%
1930	320	+4.9%
1950	242	−24.4%
1961	242	+0.0%
1970	205	−15.3%
1980	171	−16.6%
1991	144	−15.8%
2001	127	−11.8%
2011	127	+0.0%
2021	132	+3.9%
Source: Censuses
