= Tichá Orlice =

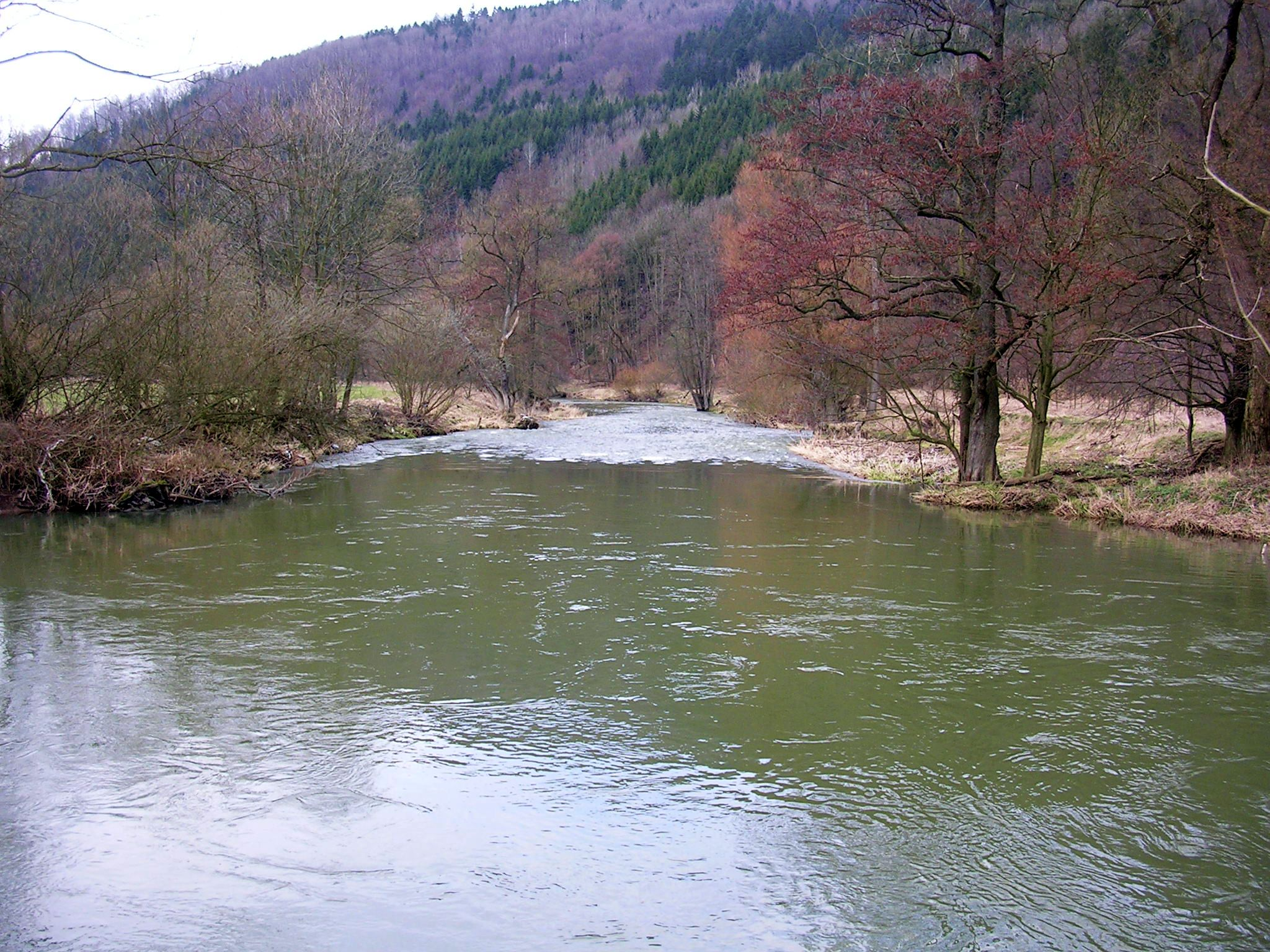
- The Tichá Orlice in Orlické Podhůří

Location
- Country: Czech Republic
- Regions: Hradec Králové; Pardubice

Physical characteristics
- Source
  - location: Červená Voda, Hanušovice Highlands
  - coordinates: 50°3′13″N 16°48′17″E
  - elevation: 809 m (2,654 ft)
- Mouth
  - location: Orlice
  - coordinates: 50°21′30″N 16°26′5″E
  - elevation: 249 m (817 ft)
- Length: 101.7 km (63.2 mi)
- Basin size: 756.4 km^{2} (292.0 sq mi)
- Discharge
  - average: 7.4 m^{3}/s (260 cu ft/s) near estuary

Basin features
- Progression: Orlice→ Elbe→ North Sea

The Tichá Orlice (Czech pronunciation: [ˈcɪxaː ˈorlɪtsɛ]; German: Stille Adler) is a river in the Czech Republic, the secondary source river of the Orlice River. It flows through the Hradec Králové and Pardubice regions. It is 101.7 km (63.2 mi) long, making it the 21st longest river in the Czech Republic.

== Etymology ==
The name Orlice is derived from the Slavic word orel, i.e. 'eagle' (literally "female eagle"). The river probably got its name from the abundance of eagles, but it could also have just been the accidental catch of an eagle. The attribute tichá means 'silent' and refers to its character (compared to Divoká Orlice, i.e. "wild Orlice").

== Characteristic ==
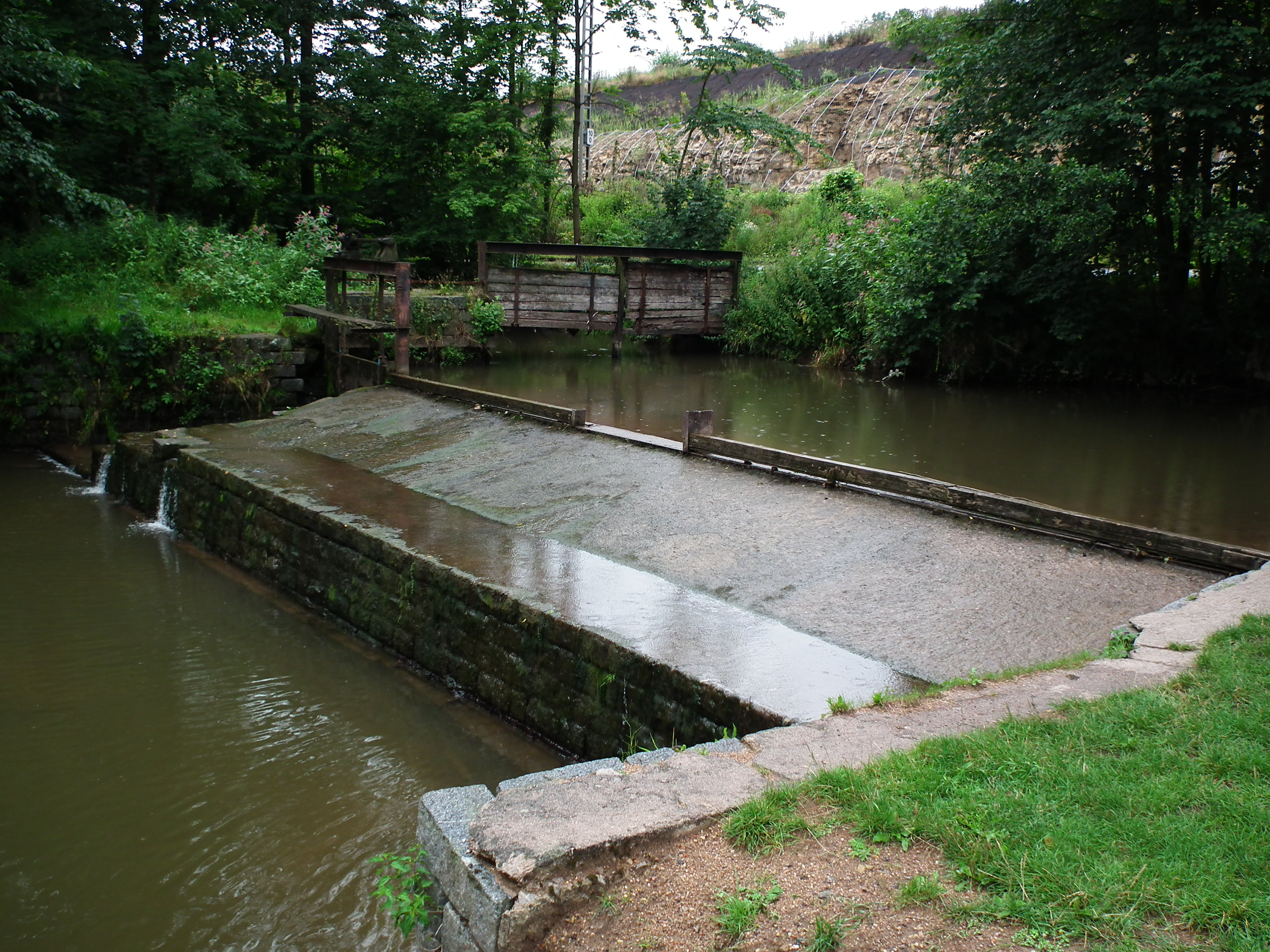
Weir in Ústí nad Orlicí

The Tichá Orlice originates in the territory of Červená Voda in the Hanušovice Highlands at an elevation of 809 m (2,654 ft) and flows to Žďár nad Orlicí, where it merges with the Divoká Orlice at an elevation of 249 m (817 ft) and together they form the Orlice. It is 101.7 km (63.2 mi) long, making it the 21st longest river in the Czech Republic. Its drainage basin has an area of 756.4 km^{2} (292.0 sq mi).

The longest tributaries of the Tichá Orlice are:

| Tributary | Length (km) | River km | Side |
|---|---|---|---|
| Třebovka | 41.2 | 48.2 | left |
| Čermná | 13.7 | 71.3 | left |
| Lipkovský potok | 13.3 | 93.6 | right |
| Husí krk | 12.7 | 44.7 | left |
| Libchavský potok | 10.8 | 51.3 | right |
| Bystřec | 10.7 | 76.1 | left |
| Lukavický potok | 10.0 | 65.2 | right |

== Course ==
The largest town on the river is Ústí nad Orlicí. The river flows through the municipal territories of Červená Voda, Králíky, Lichkov, Mladkov, Těchonín, Sobkovice, Jamné nad Orlicí, Jablonné nad Orlicí, Mistrovice, Verměřovice, Letohrad, Dolní Dobrouč, Ústí nad Orlicí, Hrádek, Orlické Podhůří, Sudislav nad Orlicí, Brandýs nad Orlicí, Zářecká Lhota, Choceň, Újezd u Chocně, Čermná nad Orlicí, Borohrádek and Žďár nad Orlicí.

== Bodies of water ==
There are 557 bodies of water in the basin area. The largest of them is the Hvězda fishpond with an area of 74.9 ha (185 acres), built on the Třebovka.

== Fauna ==
The entire course of the river is protected as a Special Area of Conservation for the abundant occurrence of the European river lamprey.

== Tourism ==
The Tichá Orlice is suitable for river tourism, but the upper course is suitable only for experienced paddlers. The lower course is popular because of its year-round navigability.
