= Jaroslav Malátek =

Czech painter (1923–2014)

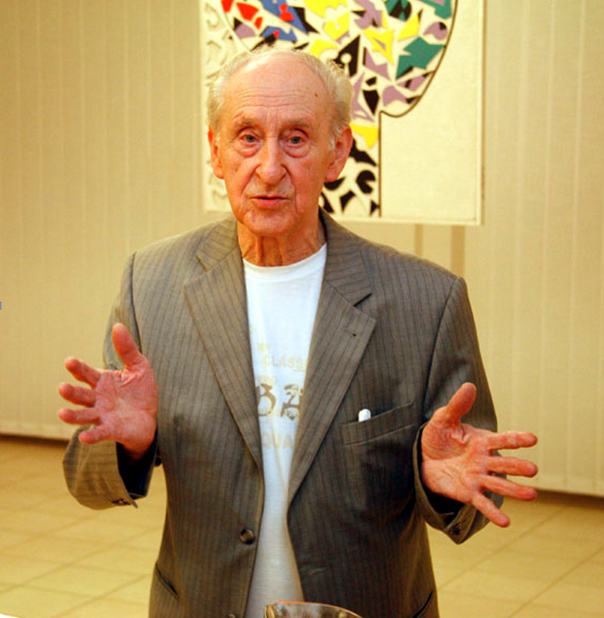
- Born: 13 March 1923; Choceň, Czechoslovakia
- Died: 12 December 2014 (aged 91); Ústí nad Orlicí, Czech Republic

Jaroslav Malátek (13 March 1923 – 12 December 2014) was a Czech painter. He was a prominent representative of Czech painting from the turn of the century. He was influeneced by French cubism, as well as the Renaissance in the 15th and 16th century, when painters attempted to represent space. In his work, the three-dimensionality of objects was replaced by the non-perspective of spaciousness, containing a meaning. This led to the creation of a new style called “Spatial Metaphors“.

== Life ==
Jaroslav Malátek was born on 13 March 1923 in Choceň. He graduated from Česká Třebová secondary school, where he was directed towards painting by Professor Bělský, who instructed him in painting. During his studies, he was also interested in athletics. His sport achievements eventually led him to Prague. There he had the opportunity to visit various galleries and encounter the works of famous painters after his sport meetings. A few years after his studies, he and many of his peers were forcibly recruited into the army and sent to Germany. His survival in Nuremberg during the war was a miracle, especially the mayhem, full of the sounds of sirens before the airstrikes by the allied units of the United States Air Force (USAF) and the Royal Air Force (RAF) between 1940 and 1945, when Nuremberg was almost destroyed.

After World War II he successfully graduated from the College of Education at Charles University in Prague (1945–1949). He studied under professors Martin Salcman, Karel Lidický and Cyril Bouda, who successfully instructed him in the technique and art of the master painter Max Švabinský.

During the 1950s, the time of communist oppression, Jaroslav Malátek had to stop pursuing his career as a teacher. He focused even more on painting. He drew much of his inspiration from sceneries, which eventually became his inspiration for life. The View of Homol, Scenery in Zámrsk, From Javornice to the Mountains (an area that the painter Vojtěch Sedláček was from), Choceň by Lhoty, Běstovice Scenery – those are only some of his most prominent sceneries. Because during communism having an income from painting was only possible for a select few, Jaroslav Malátek had to work as a glass worker, building painter, miner and a logistics worker. He liked working in advertising and sometimes worked in interior design. In 1980, he moved from Choceň to Brandýs nad Orlicí. There, he met his girlfriend, Helena, who gave him further inspiration. During that time, he moved away from his scenic compositions to abstract paintings and pictures. This led to the creation of three-dimensional pictures utilizing materials such as fiberboard, metal and glass. All three-dimensional pictures were first created as small drafts and maquettes. These were subsequently magnified using different computer programs, and then fashioned in their intended size. The three-dimensional pictures, "Spatial Metaphors” by Jaroslav Malátek are intended to accent modern housing. They decorate the spaces of several European institutions. Due to their uniqueness, they have lately become sought after by successful individuals from Europe and Asia, mainly as a means of investment. The pictures can be seen at the author's exhibitions and potentially at auctions.

=== Selected paintings ===
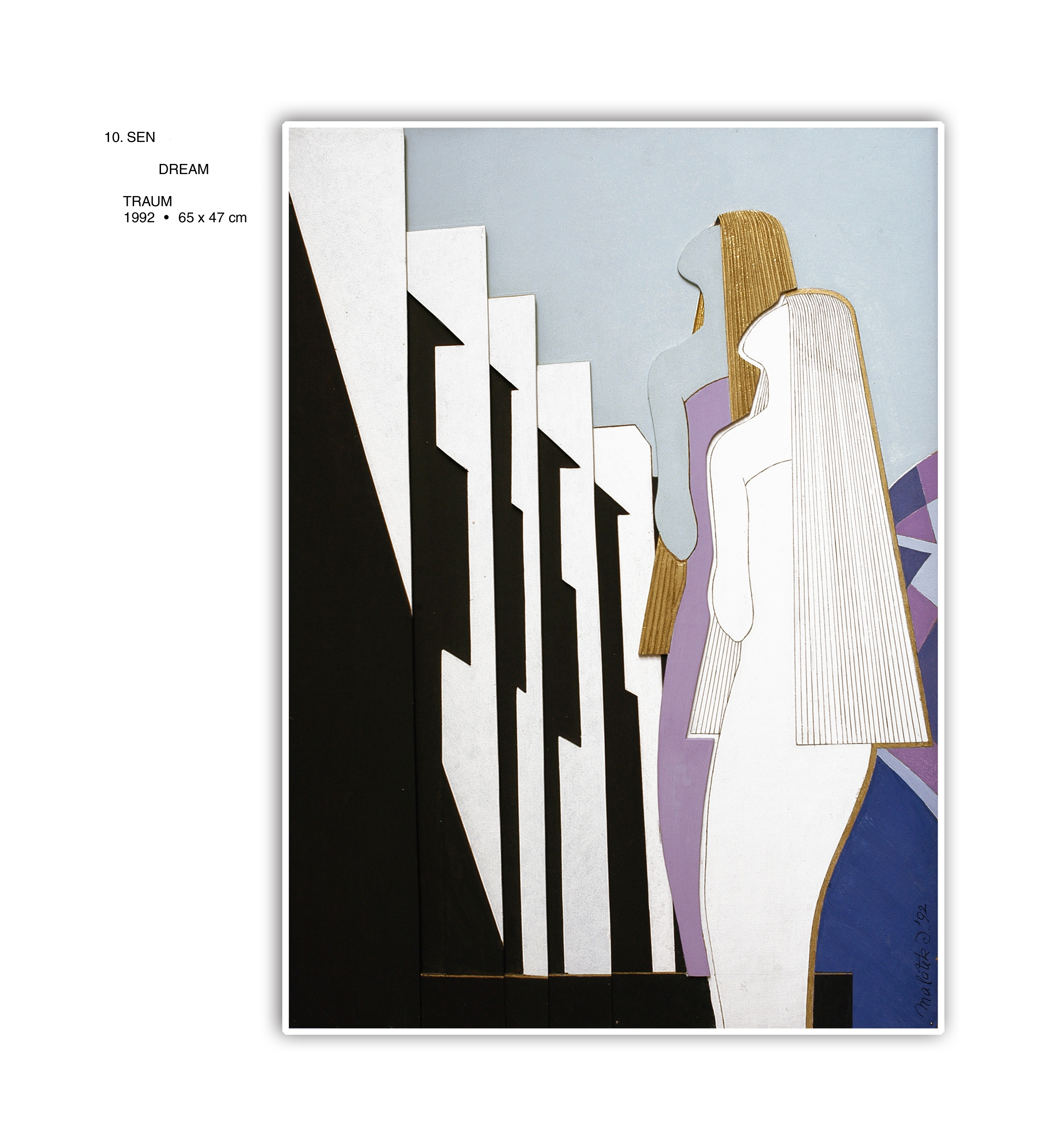
Dreams

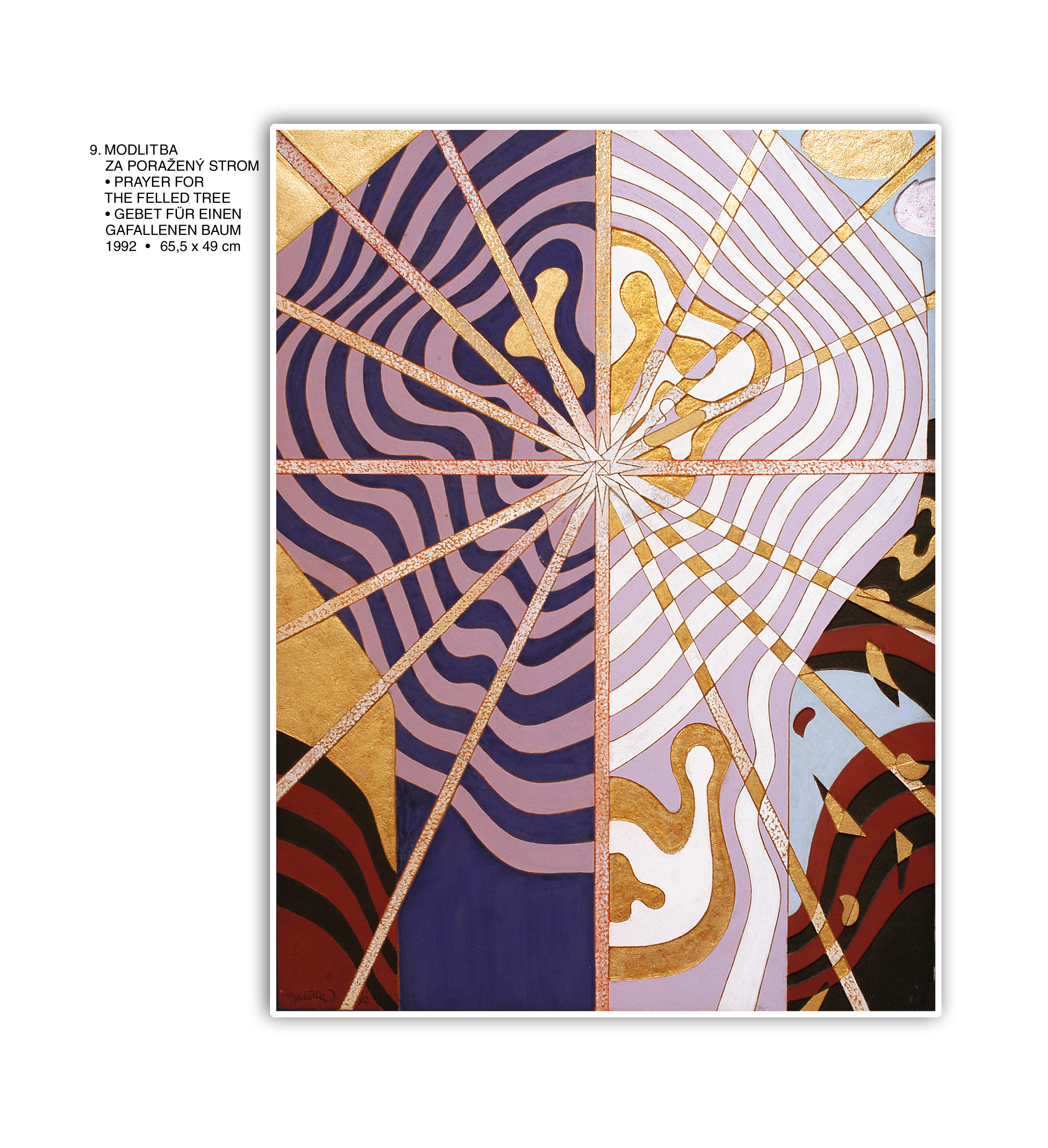
Life is Life

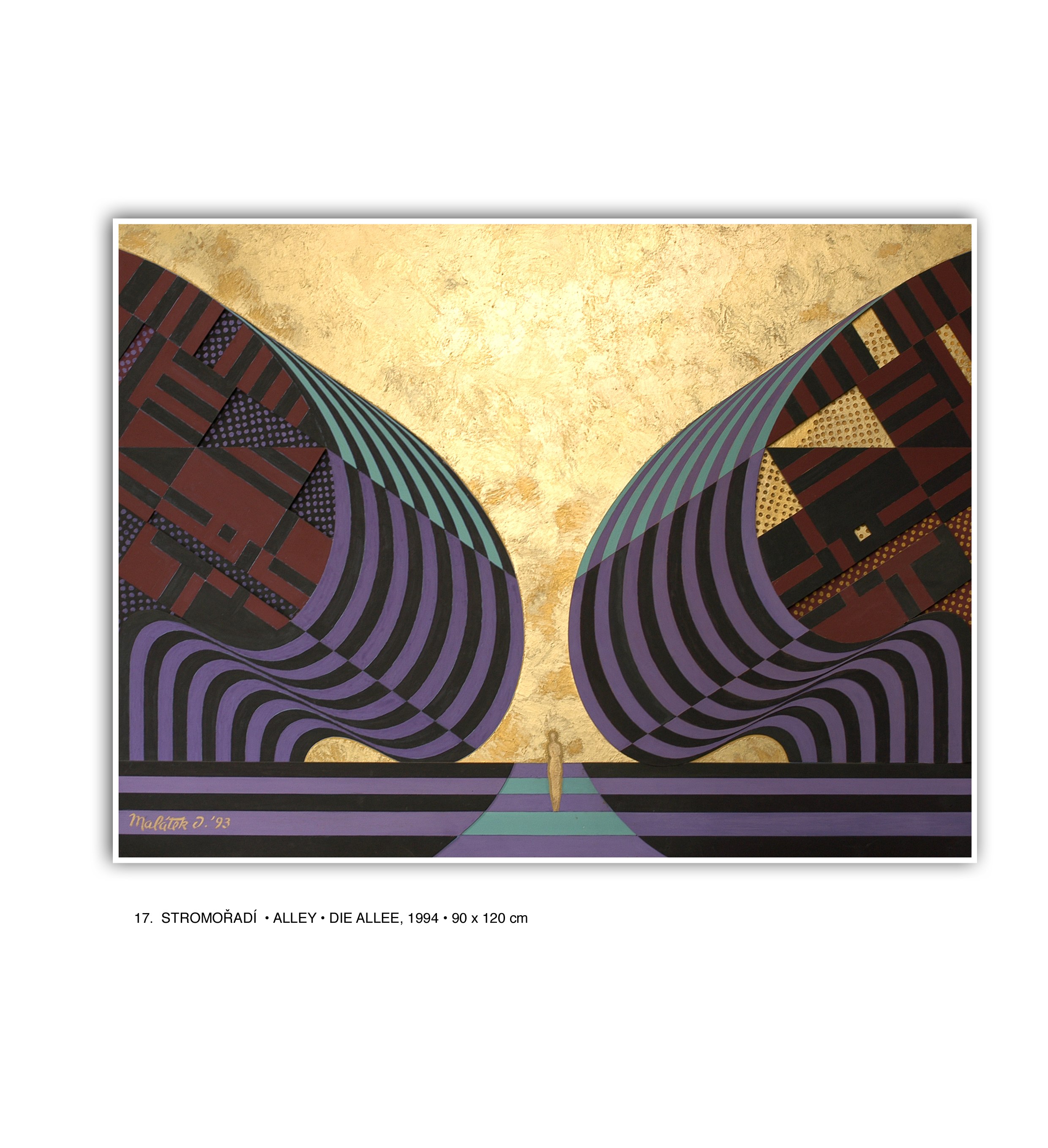
Alley

=== Exhibitions (selection) ===
- Art Gallery, Náchod
- Journey to three-dimensional pictures, Municipal library, Letohrad
- Gallery Glass Cube, Pardubice
- Journey to three-dimensional pictures 1968–2002, Town Hall Gallery, Ústí nad Orlicí
- Ghetto Museum, Terezín
- Cultural Center Svět Gallery, Mladá Boleslav
- Czechoslovak Chamber Sculpture, Exhibition Hall Mánes, Prague
- Movie Art Competition, Zurich, Switzerland
- International competition, Jena, Gramny
- International competition in Kobe, Japan
- International painting competition, Osaka, Japan
- International competition, Jena, Germany
- International competition, Erfurt, Germany
- International competition, Budapest, Hungary
- International competition, Vienna, Austria
