= Orlice =

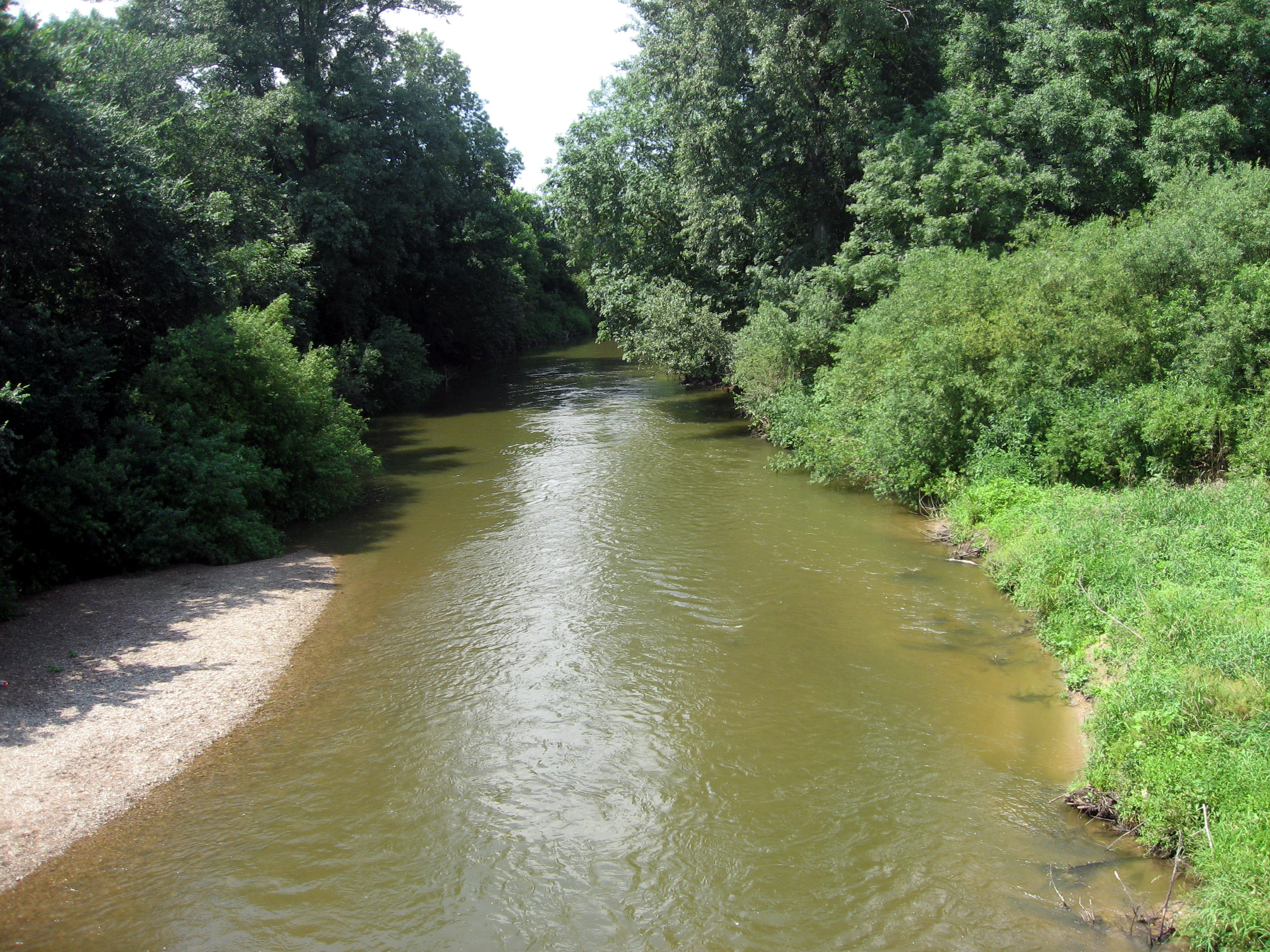
- The Orlice in Třebechovice pod Orebem

Location
- Country: Czech Republic
- Region: Hradec Králové

Physical characteristics
- Source: Divoká Orlice
  - location: Szczytna, Bystrzyckie Mountains
  - coordinates: 50°21′29″N 16°26′6″E
  - elevation: 802 m (2,631 ft)
- Mouth
  - location: Elbe
  - coordinates: 50°12′12″N 15°49′30″E
  - elevation: 228 m (748 ft)
- Length: 132.2 km (82.1 mi)
- Basin size: 2,036.9 km^{2} (786.5 sq mi)
- Discharge
  - average: 21.8 m^{3}/s (770 cu ft/s) near estuary

Basin features
- Progression: Elbe→ North Sea

The Orlice (Czech pronunciation: [ˈorlɪtsɛ]; German: Adler, Polish: Orlica) is a river in the Czech Republic, with a brief stretch in Poland. It is a left tributary of the Elbe River. It flows through the Hradec Králové Region. It is formed by the confluence of the Divoká Orlice and Tichá Orlice rivers. Together with the Divoká Orlice, which is its main source, the Orlice is 132.2 km (82.1 mi) long, of which 129.0 km (80.2 mi) is in the Czech Republic, making it the 14th longest river in the country. Without the Divoká Orlice, it is 32.9 km (20.4 mi) long.

== Etymology ==
The name is derived from the Slavic word orel, i.e. 'eagle' (literally "female eagle"). The river probably got its name from the abundance of eagles, but it could also have just been the accidental catch of an eagle. The names of its sources, Divoká and Tichá, refer to their character: tichá means 'quiet' and divoká means 'wild'. The Divoká Orlice was also called Dravá Orlice (i.e. 'ferocious', 'fierce').

== Characteristic ==
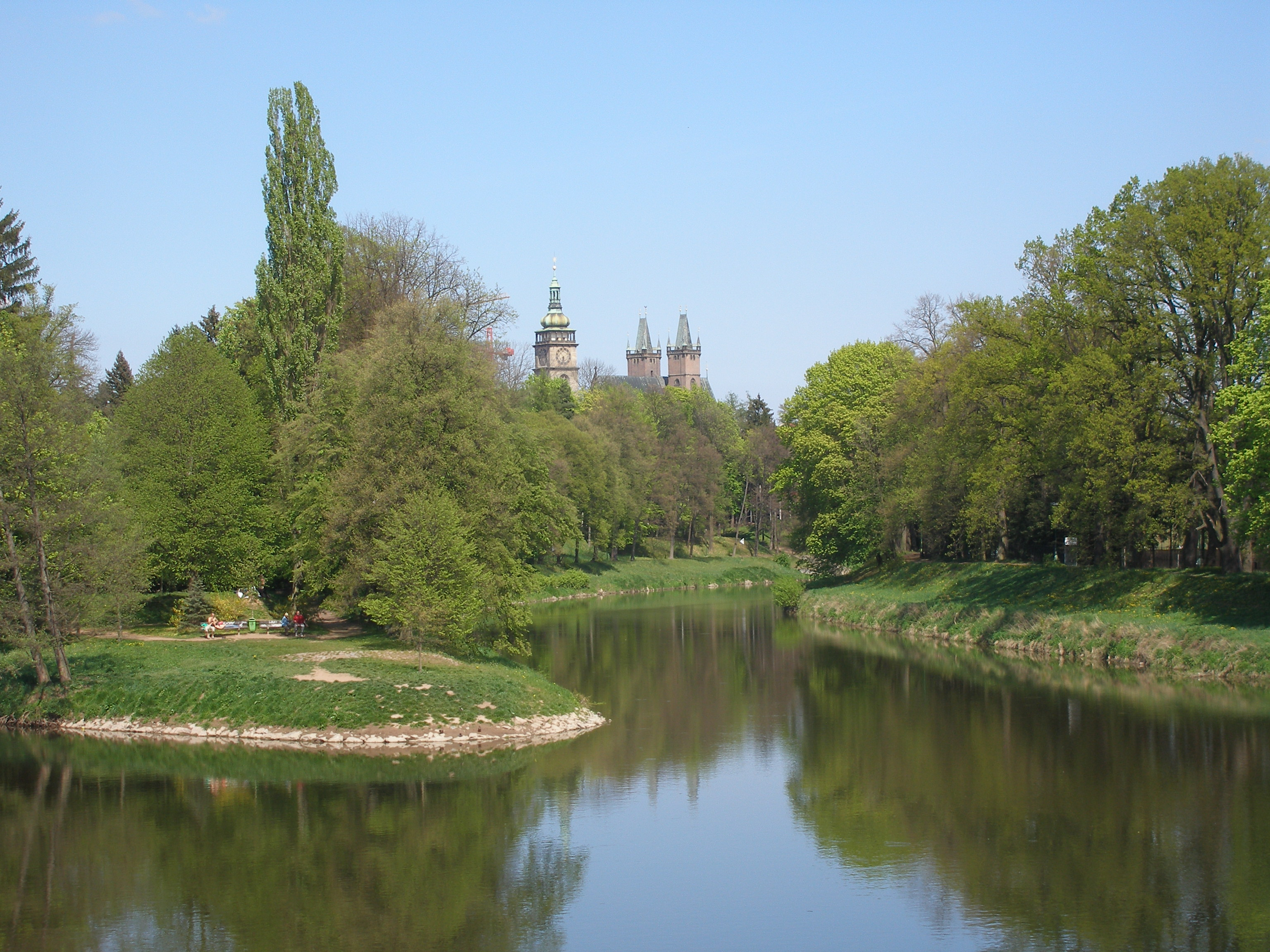
Confluence of the Orlice and Elbe

The Orlice is one of the least disturbed watercourses in the Czech Republic and has only three weirs. From a water management point of view, the Orlice, Divoká Orlice and Tichá Orlice are three different rivers with separate numbering of river kilometres. The Orlice itself is formed by the confluence of the Divoká Orlice (which is larger by volume and therefore the main source) and Tichá Orlice (which is longer) in the territory of Žďár nad Orlicí, and is 32.9 km (20.4 mi) long. (Note: including the 400 metres that were added after connecting the Jordán oxbow lake back to the river in 2021)

In a broader point of view, the Orlice (as Divoká Orlice) originates in the territory of Szczytna in the Bystrzyckie Mountains, on the slope of the Biesiec mountain at an elevation of 802 m (2,631 ft) and flows to Hradec Králové, where it enters the Elbe River at an elevation of 228 m (748 ft). It is 132.2 km (82.1 mi) long, of which 3.2 km (2.0 mi) is in Poland and the next 29.5 km (18.3 mi) forms the Czech–Polish border. Including the border, 129.0 km (80.2 mi) is in the Czech Republic, making it the 14th longest river in the country.

The Tichá Orlice is the secondary source of the Orlice. It originates in the territory of Červená Voda in the Hanušovice Highlands and is located exclusively in the Czech Republic. It has less volume than Divoká Orlice but it is the longer source. Taking into account the Tichá Orlice, the total length of the Orlice would be 134.7 km (83.7 mi).

The drainage basin of the Orlice has an area of 2,036.9 km^{2} (786.5 sq mi), of which 1,964.5 km^{2} (758.5 sq mi) is in the Czech Republic.

The sources and longest tributaries of the Orlice are:

Tributary	Length (km)	River km	Side
Tichá Orlice	101.8	32.7	left
Divoká Orlice	99.3	32.7	–
Dědina	56.7	15.3	right
Stříbrný potok	8.9	5.3	left

== Settlements ==
The river flows through the municipal territories of Albrechtice nad Orlicí, Týniště nad Orlicí, Petrovice, Třebechovice pod Orebem, Běleč nad Orlicí, Blešno and Hradec Králové.

== Bodies of water ==
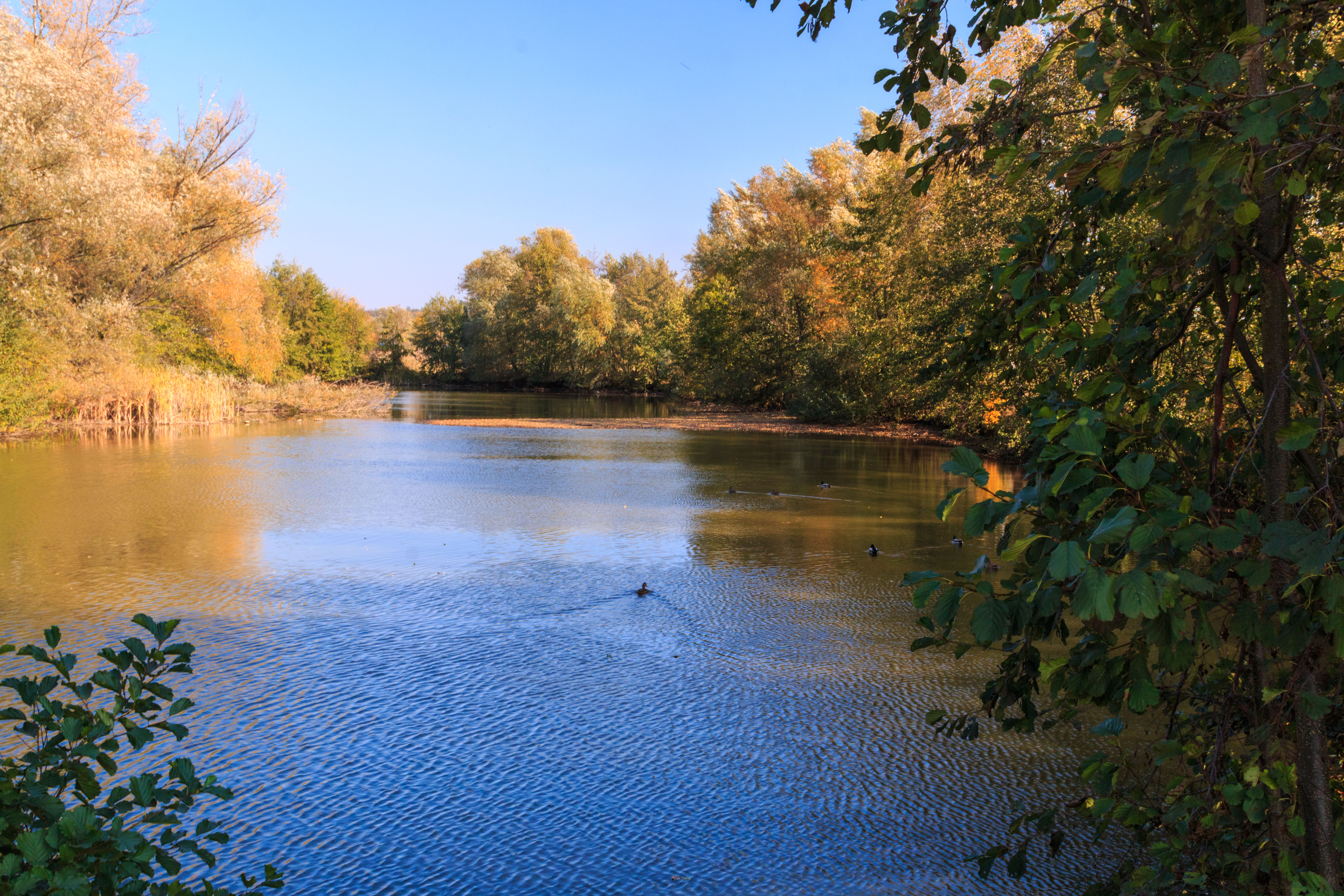
Černé jezero oxbow lake

There are no reservoirs and fishponds built on the Orlice. There are 1,534 bodies of water in the basin area. The largest of them is the fishpond Hvězda with an area of 75 ha (190 acres). The second largest is Pastviny I Reservoir with an area of 63 ha (160 acres), built on the Divoká Orlice. The area around the river is rich in oxbow lakes.

== Tourism ==
The Orlice is suitable for river tourism and belongs to the rivers suitable for less experienced paddlers. The river has enough water throughout the year.
