= Jizera Formation =

Geological unit in the Czech Republic

- Stratigraphic range: Turonian, ~92 Ma
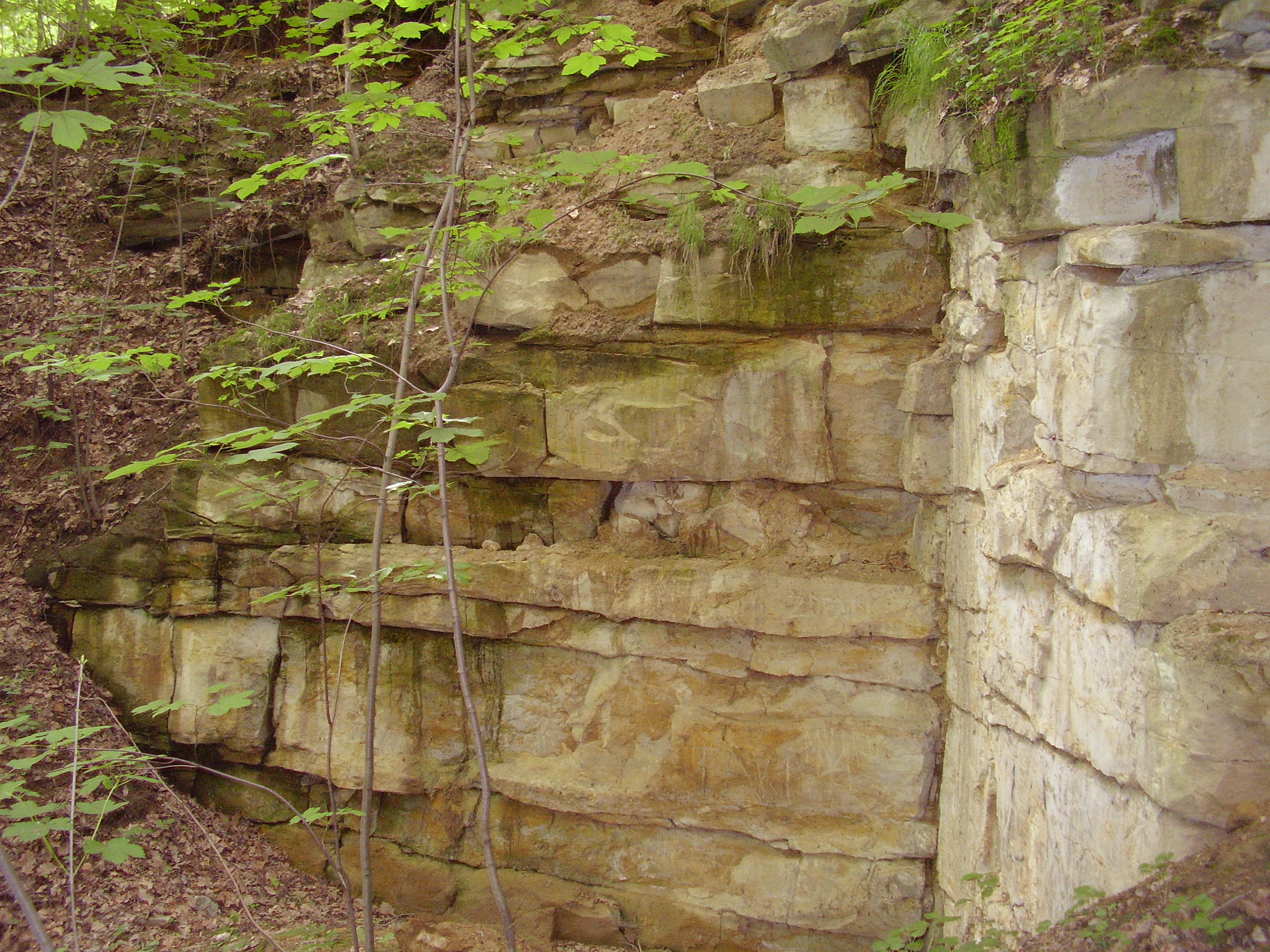
- Type locality of the Jizera Formation at a quarry at Zářecká Lhota
- Type: Geological formation
- Unit of: Middle Iser Shales
- Underlies: Teplice Formation
- Overlies: Bílá Hora Formation
- Thickness: up to 420 metres (1,380 ft)

Lithology
- Primary: Marlstone, sandstone

Location
- Coordinates: 49°59′N 16°14′E
- Country: Czech Republic
- Extent: Bohemian Cretaceous Basin

Type section
- Named for: Jizera Mountains
- Jizera Formation (Czech Republic)

The Jizera Formation is a geologic unit of Late Cretaceous (Turonian) age, located in the Czech Republic. It is a unit of the Bohemian Cretaceous Basin. It consists of fluvial to shallow marine sediments and pterosaur fossils are among the remains found in the Jizera Formation. The type locality of the Jizera Formation is a quarry in Zářecká Lhota.

== Paleofauna ==
- Pteranodontoid pterosaur Cretornis hlavaci - "a complete humerus (upper arm bone), an ulna, radius, wrist and two phalanges of the wing finger"

== See also ==
- List of fossiliferous stratigraphic units in Europe
