= Zapal =

Zapal may refer to:

- Jaromír Zápal (1923–1984), Czechoslovak illustrator, painter and writer
- Zapał., taxonomic author abbreviation of Hugo Zapałowicz (1852–1917), Slovenian botanist and natural scientist
