= Borohrádek =

- Town
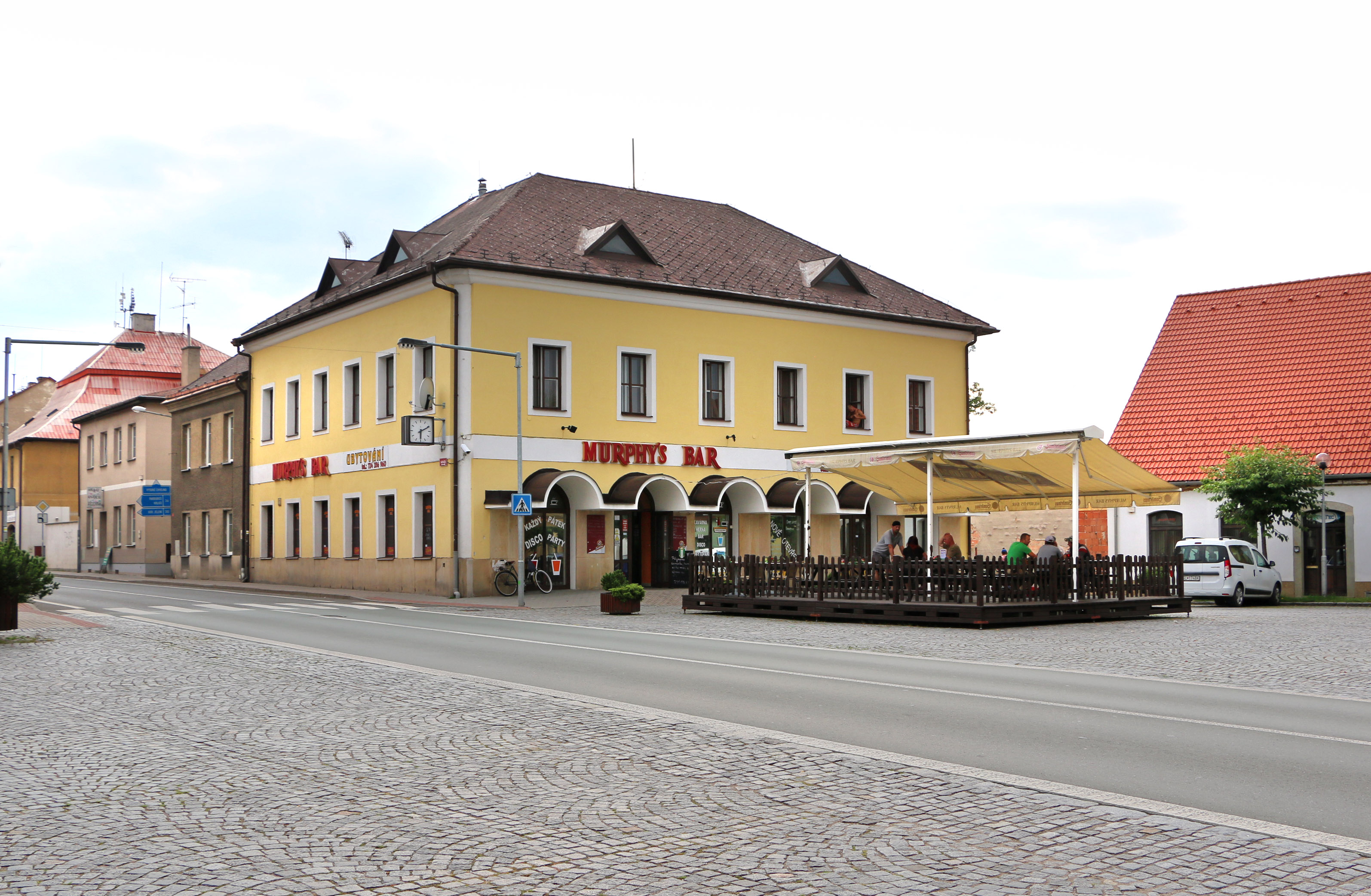
- Town square

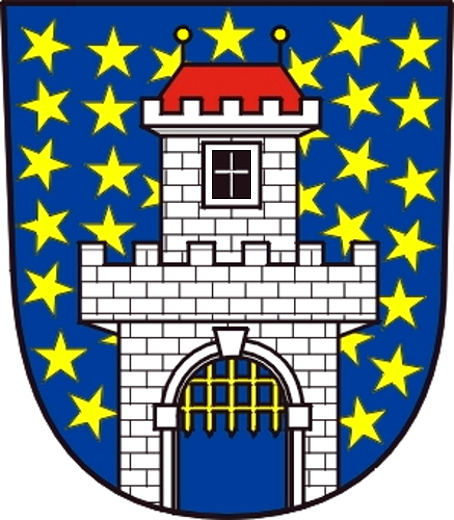
- Flag Coat of arms

- Location in the Czech Republic
- Coordinates: 50°5′52″N 16°5′38″E
- Country: Czech Republic
- Region: Hradec Králové
- District: Rychnov nad Kněžnou
- First mentioned: 1342

Government
  - Mayor: Martin Moravec

Area
  - Total: 13.98 km^{2} (5.40 sq mi)
- Elevation: 258 m (846 ft)

Population (2026-01-01)
  - Total: 2,059
  - Density: 147.3/km^{2} (381.5/sq mi)
- Time zone: UTC+1 (CET)
  - Summer (DST): UTC+2 (CEST)
- Postal code: 517 24
- Website: www.mestoborohradek.cz

Borohrádek (Czech pronunciation: [ˈboroɦraːdɛk]; German: Heideburg) is a town in Rychnov nad Kněžnou District in the Hradec Králové Region of the Czech Republic. It has about 2,100 inhabitants. The town is located on the Tichá Orlice River.

== Administrative division ==
Borohrádek consists of two municipal parts (in brackets population according to the 2021 census):

- Borohrádek (1,944)
- Šachov (81)

== Etymology ==
Originally, the local fortress was called Hrádek ('little castle' in Czech) and the settlement around it Bor (i.e. 'pine forest', referring to the forest surrounding the settlement), but these two names were sometimes confused. From the 15th century, the compound Borhrádek (later changed to Borohrádek) began to appear to distinguish it from many other places with the name Hrádek.

== Geography ==
Borohrádek is located about 21 kilometres (13 mi) southeast of Hradec Králové. It lies in the Orlice Table. The highest point is at 293 m (961 ft) above sea level. The town is situated on the left bank of the Tichá Orlice River.

== History ==
The first written mention of Borohrádek is from 1342, when it was already a market town with a fortress, and when it belonged to the Potštejn estate. The Betengel family, which acquired Borohrádek in 1582, had rebuilt the fortress into a smaller manor house. The manor house burned down in 1811.

In 1971, Borohrádek obtained the town status.

== Demographics ==
Historical population

Year	Pop.	±%
1869	1,872	—
1880	1,993	+6.5%
1890	1,959	−1.7%
1900	1,942	−0.9%
1910	2,002	+3.1%

Year	Pop.	±%
1921	1,991	−0.5%
1930	2,260	+13.5%
1950	1,752	−22.5%
1961	2,055	+17.3%
1970	2,180	+6.1%

Year	Pop.	±%
1980	2,258	+3.6%
1991	2,193	−2.9%
2001	2,136	−2.6%
2011	2,108	−1.3%
2021	2,025	−3.9%

Source: Censuses

== Transport ==
The I/36 road, which connects Pradubice with Rychnov nad Kněžnou District, runs through the town.

Borohrádek is located on the railway lines heading from Choceň to Hronov and to Týniště nad Orlicí.

== Sights ==
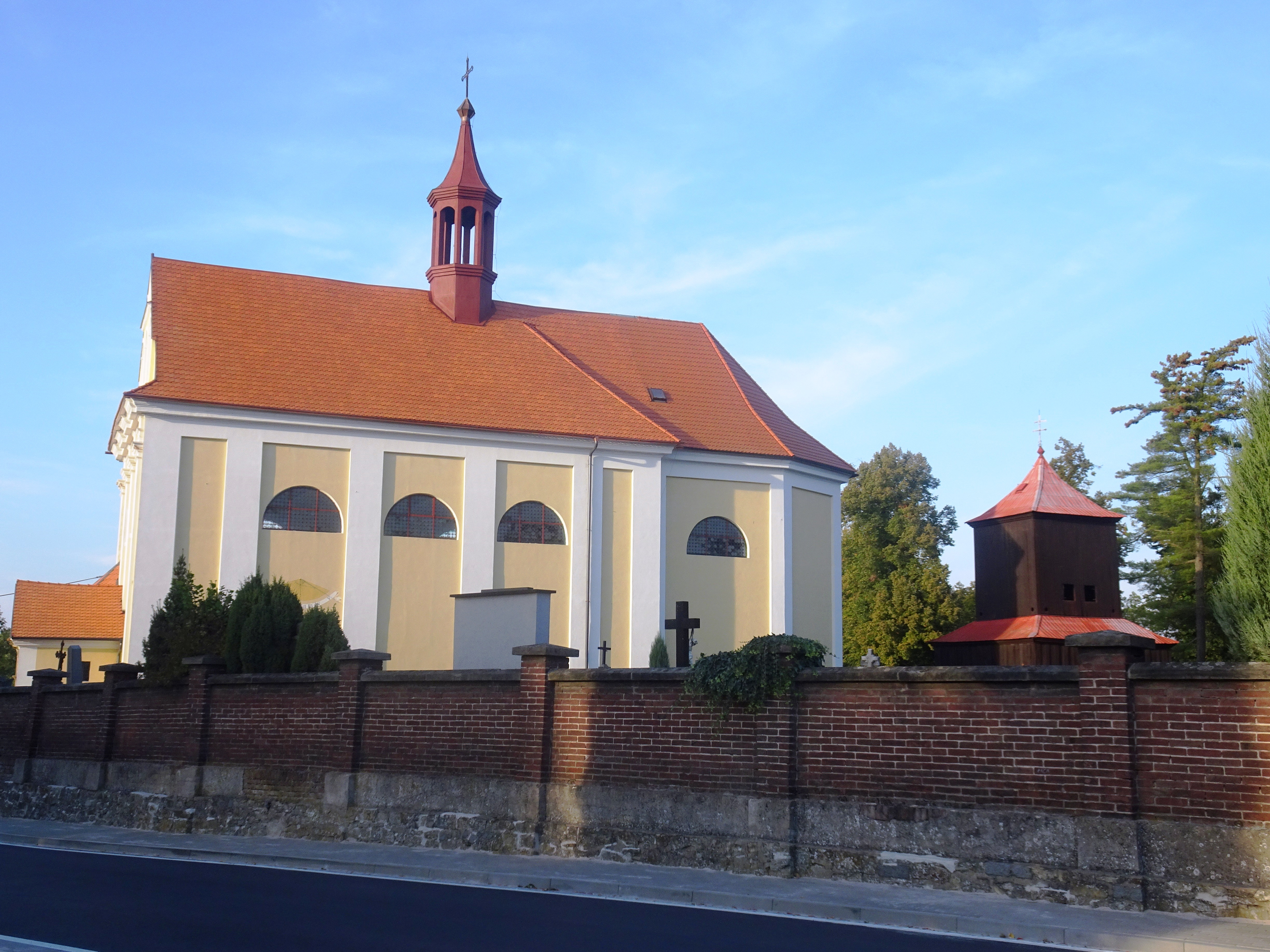
Church of Saint Michael the Archangel

The main landmark of Borohrádek is the Church of Saint Michael the Archangel. It was built in the early Baroque style in 1669–1673. Next to the church is a separate wooden bell tower and a pseudo-Gothic tomb of the Lützow family from the end of the 19th century.

The Church of the Holy Trinity is located in Šachov. It was also built in the early Baroque style, in 1692–1693.
