= Tomáš Norbert Koutník =

Czech composer and organist (1698–1775)

Tomáš Norbert Koutník (19 December 1698 – 16 January 1775) was a Czech composer and organist. His short oratorio "the innocent thief" contains roles for the soul (Duše), unrighteousness (Nespravedlnost), Jesus and Pilate. He was born and died in Choceň.

== Recordings ==
Koutník: Requiem in e flat major. Kriminalista nevinný - Otto Novák (soloist), Dagmar Rosíková (vocalist), Marie Mrázová (vocalist), Vítězslav Pochman (vocalist), Jan Soumar (vocalist) Cantores Pragenses, Prague Symphony Orchestra, Josef Hercl Supraphon 1971
