= Blešno =

- Municipality
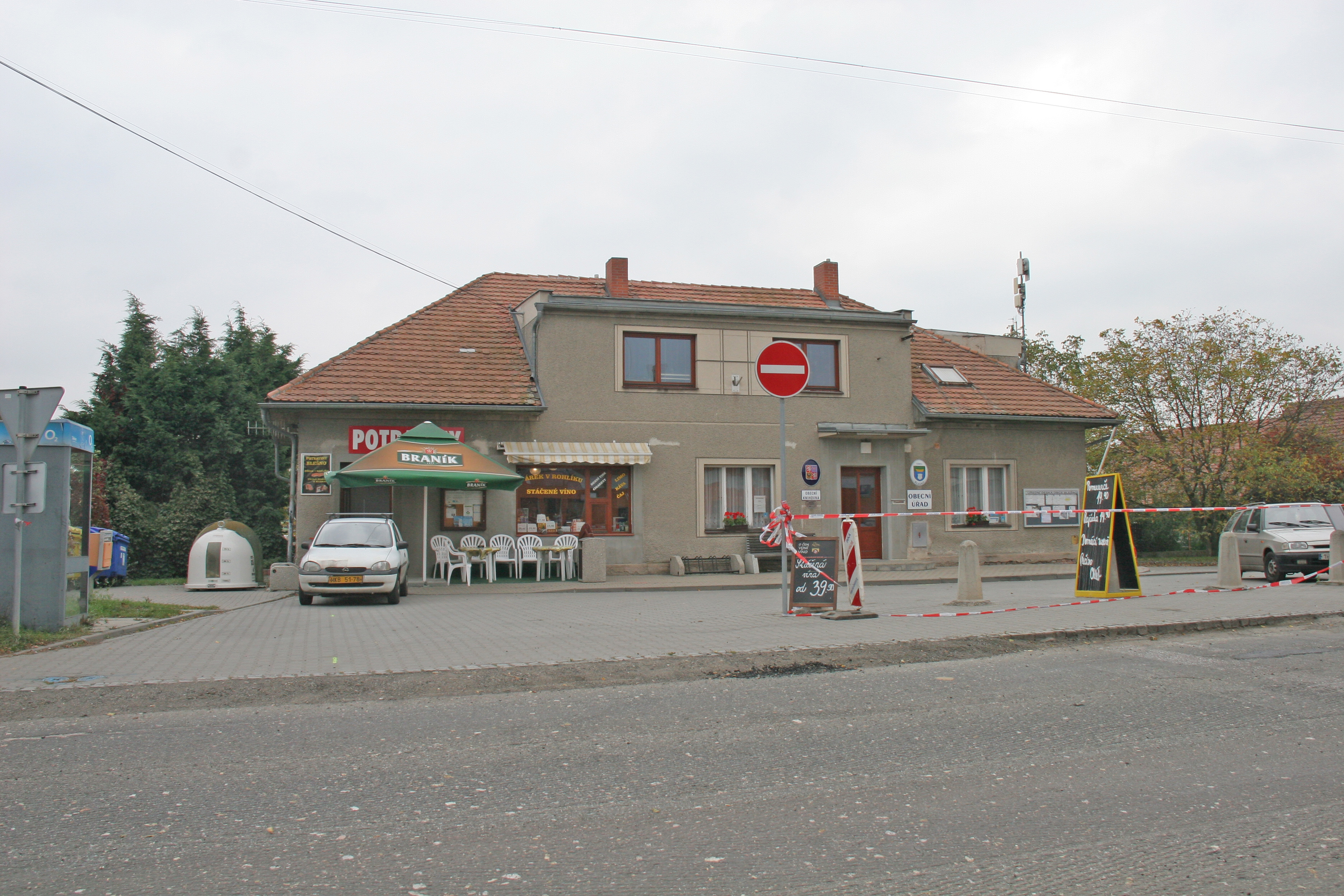
- Municipal office

- Flag Coat of arms

- Location in the Czech Republic
- Coordinates: 50°12′50″N 15°55′51″E
- Country: Czech Republic
- Region: Hradec Králové
- District: Hradec Králové
- First mentioned: 1496

Area
  - Total: 4.11 km^{2} (1.59 sq mi)
- Elevation: 237 m (778 ft)

Population (2026-01-01)
  - Total: 444
  - Density: 108/km^{2} (280/sq mi)
- Time zone: UTC+1 (CET)
  - Summer (DST): UTC+2 (CEST)
- Postal code: 503 46
- Website: www.blesno.cz

Blešno is a municipality and village in Hradec Králové District in the Hradec Králové Region of the Czech Republic. It has about 400 inhabitants.

== Etymology ==
The name was probably derived from the false fleabane plant, called blešník in Czech. According to some sources, the name is derived from blecha (i.e. 'flea') and derisively meant "full of fleas".

== Geography ==
Blešno is located about 5 kilometres (3 mi) east of Hradec Králové. It lies in a flat landscape in the Orlice Table. The Orlice River flows along the southern municipal border.

== History ==
The first written mention of Blešno is from 1496, when it was bought by Mikuláš Trčka of Lípa and became part of the Opočno estate. After the estate was confiscated in 1636, Emperor Ferdinand II donated the estate to the Colloredo family. The Colloredo family, from 1789 known as the Colloredo-Mansfeld family, owned Blešno until the establishment of a sovereign municipality in 1849.

== Demographics ==
Historical population

Year	Pop.	±%
1869	402	—
1880	428	+6.5%
1890	426	−0.5%
1900	368	−13.6%
1910	357	−3.0%

Year	Pop.	±%
1921	353	−1.1%
1930	340	−3.7%
1950	309	−9.1%
1961	286	−7.4%
1970	272	−4.9%

Year	Pop.	±%
1980	272	+0.0%
1991	279	+2.6%
2001	313	+12.2%
2011	350	+11.8%
2021	432	+23.4%

Source: Censuses

== Transport ==
The I/11 road from Hradec Králové to Šumperk runs through the municipality.

== Sights ==
The only protected cultural monument in the municipality is the Chapel of the Heart of Jesus. It was built in the Neo-Romanesque style in 1913.
