= Zářecká Lhota =

- Municipality
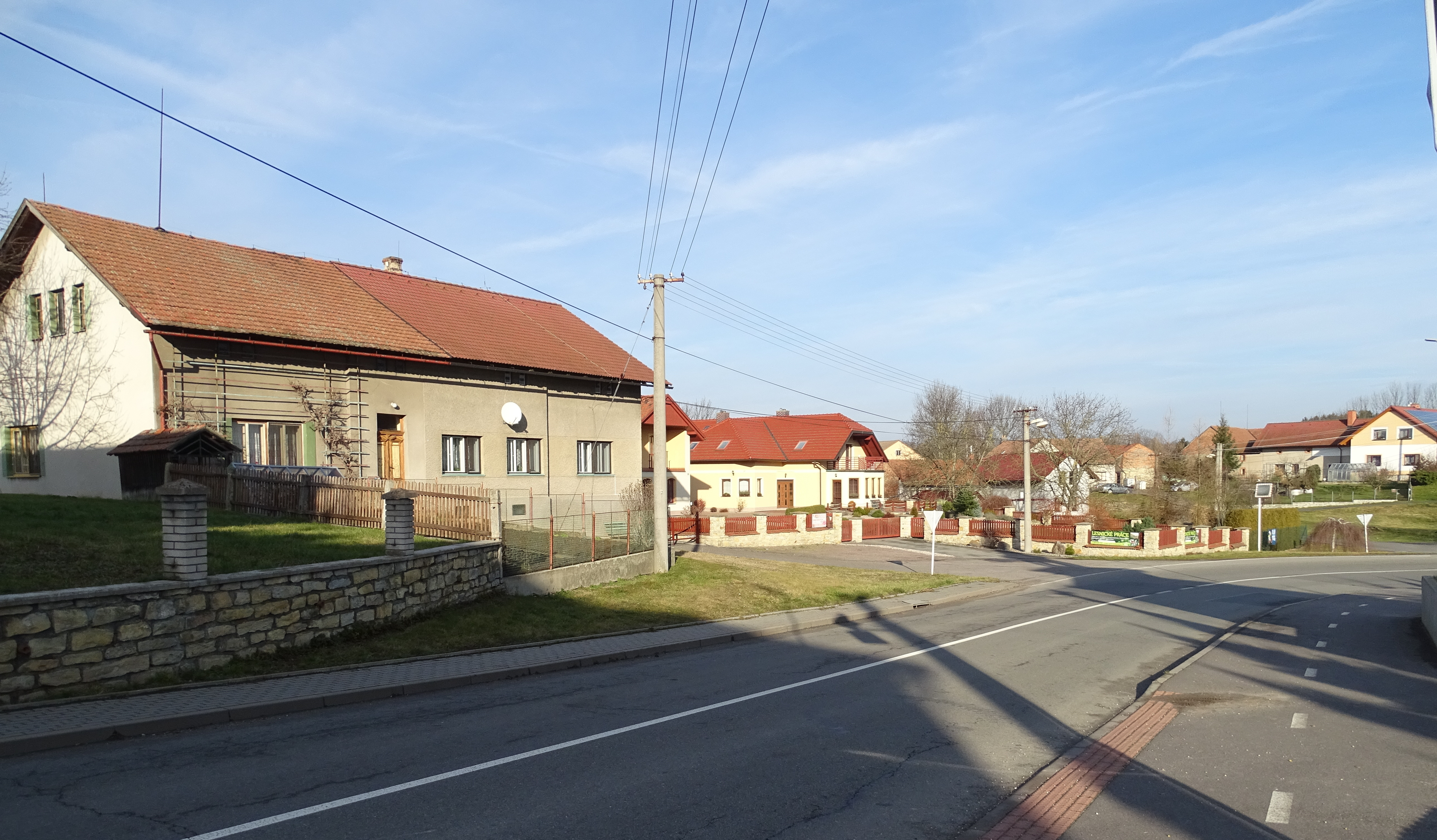
- Centre of Zářecká Lhota

- Location in the Czech Republic
- Coordinates: 49°59′35″N 16°14′46″E
- Country: Czech Republic
- Region: Pardubice
- District: Ústí nad Orlicí
- First mentioned: 1397

Area
  - Total: 3.02 km^{2} (1.17 sq mi)
- Elevation: 335 m (1,099 ft)

Population (2026-01-01)
  - Total: 222
  - Density: 73.5/km^{2} (190/sq mi)
- Time zone: UTC+1 (CET)
  - Summer (DST): UTC+2 (CEST)
- Postal code: 565 01
- Website: www.zareckalhota.cz

Zářecká Lhota is a municipality and village in Ústí nad Orlicí District in the Pardubice Region of the Czech Republic. It has about 200 inhabitants.

== Etymology ==
Lhota is a common Czech toponym. The initial name of the village was Kunšova Lhota (Kunš's Lhota), then it was called Lhota nad Choceňkem. From the 16th century, the name Zářecká Lhota (derived from the Czech words za řekou, meaning 'behind the river') is used.

== Geography ==
Zářecká Lhota is located about 11 kilometres (7 mi) west of Ústí nad Orlicí and 33 km (21 mi) east of Pardubice. It lies mostly in the Orlice Table. A small part of the municipality in the east extends into the Svitavy Uplands and includes the highest point of Zářecká Lhota at 367 m (1,204 ft) above sea level. The municipality is situated on the left bank of the Tichá Orlice River.

== History ==
The first written mention of Zářecká Lhota is from 1397.

== Demographics ==
Historical population

| Year | Pop. | ±% |
|---|---|---|
| 1869 | 228 | — |
| 1880 | 248 | +8.8% |
| 1890 | 216 | −12.9% |
| 1900 | 194 | −10.2% |
| 1910 | 204 | +5.2% |

| Year | Pop. | ±% |
|---|---|---|
| 1921 | 183 | −10.3% |
| 1930 | 192 | +4.9% |
| 1950 | 161 | −16.1% |
| 1961 | 175 | +8.7% |
| 1970 | 157 | −10.3% |

| Year | Pop. | ±% |
|---|---|---|
| 1980 | 154 | −1.9% |
| 1991 | 156 | +1.3% |
| 2001 | 154 | −1.3% |
| 2011 | 183 | +18.8% |
| 2021 | 208 | +13.7% |

Source: Censuses

== Transport ==
The main railway line Prague–Brno crosses the municipality, but there is no train station. The municipality is served by the station in neighbouring Choceň.

== Sights ==
The only protected cultural monument in the municipality is a locality on a promontory above the Tichá Orlice River, where a Slavic gord (today called Hradníky) stood in the 8th century. There are also remains of an unnamed fortress from the 14th–15th centuries. Today this area is an archaeological site.

In the centre of Zářecká Lhota is a chapel dating from 1862.

== Paleontology ==
In 1880, the first and still the only known Czech pterosaur fossil (now known as Cretornis hlavaci) was found in a nearby quarry.
