= Richard Rychtarik =

Waslav Richard Rychtarik (July 20, 1894 — July 10, 1982) was a Czech-born American set and costume designer. His significance was in his efforts to bring modernism to operatic and theatrical stage productions primarily during the 1930s and 1940s. Despite his work for opera and theater, his best known work was as set designer for the television series The Honeymooners.

== Career ==
He was born Choceň in what is now the Czech Republic.

During Rychtarik's early years he became obsessed with the stage. He claimed to have attended performances at National Theatre of Prague nearly every day, staging puppet performances in his home, even constructing a set in his high school gymnasium. At a time when one could not study staging design, he studied architecture at the Czech Technical University in Prague.

He viewed Max Reinhardt as a primary influence. Obtaining small jobs assisting the theatrical crew, he was able to follow Reinhardt's work around Europe.

He first visited the United States in 1920. before settling permanently in 1925.

After emigration he began working for the Cleveland Play House, and the Cleveland Orchestra. In a 1934 speech, he rejected the idea of realism in favor of incorporating the "best theater practices" to engage the audience.

Under the leadership of conductor Artur Rodziński, the Cleveland Orchestra embarked upon a series of staged operas. Rychtarik was able to infuse his creations with the ideas which he absorbed from Reinhardt as well as modernist designers such as Vlastislav Hofman. He designed sets for Otello (1934), The Barber of Seville, Carmen (both in 1935), the American premiere of Lady Macbeth of Mzsensk, Der Rosenkavalier, and Tosca (all 1935), Elektra, Die Fledermaus, Parsifal, Tannhäuser, and Die Walküre (all 1936).

He left Cleveland and moved to New York City where he worked as scenic advisor for New York City Center and City Center Opera.

Engaged by the Metropolitan Opera, he designed new productions of Alceste (1941), Die Zauberflöte (1941), Phoebus and Pan (a dramatization of Cantata no. 201, Geschwinde, ihr wirbelnden Winde, BWV 201) (1942), Act 1 of Faust (1942; Rychtarik redesigned act 1 of the production originally designed by Joseph Urban), The Island God (1942), Lucia di Lammermoor (1942), La Serva Padrona (1942), and Manon (1947). In 1947 became the Met's technical director.

During the 1940s he also created productions for the New York City Opera, including The Bartered Bride, Carmen, The Flying Dutchman, Pagliacci, La Traviata, La Vie Parisienne (all 1945) and Rigoletto (1946).

His single Broadway production was the short-lived musical Once Over Lightly which opened November 19, 1942.

He applied for U.S. citizenship on May 17, 1943.

In 1949 he joined CBS as chief scenic designer for television. He designed the sets for Studio One in Hollywood (1948-1953), The Morey Amsterdam Show (1948), and most notably The Honeymooners (1955-1956). Subsequently, he designed the sets for the 1957 season of The Jackie Gleason Show. He retired from CBS in 1964.

Rychtarik taught scenic design at the Cleveland Institute of Music, Mannes School of Music, and was one of the founding faculty members of the Tanglewood Music Center. Among his students at Tanglewood were Sarah Caldwell.

Richard Rychtarik died at Lenox Hill Hospital in New York City after a brief illness.

== Significance ==
Professor Barbora Příhodová summarized Rychtarik's work:

By adapting the work of European scenic artists such as Adolphe Appia, Max Reinhardt and Vlastislav Hofman, Rychtarik embraced modernist thinking about staging and applied it in his work for opera. As a scenographer, he combined architectonic forms, distinctive colors, and conceptual work with light to transform the stage into a multifunctional dramatic space. With his scenographic designs and realizations he helped to disseminate and push through the vision of opera-theatre with a strong visual component, as practiced by Joseph Urban during his years on North-American stages, and so contributed to carving out a space for the designer as both the artist and the artisan, and one of the important agents in the process of opera-making.

== Personal ==
Richard Rychtarik's first wife was Charlotte Schwarzkopf (died 1951).

He married his second wife, Gertrud (known as Trude) Schwarzschild (1912–2003) in 1952. (Her previous marriage to Oskar Freitag ended with his death.) They had one daughter.
