= Leoš Šimánek =

Czech traveler (1946–2026)

Leoš Šimánek (19 April 1946 – 9 March 2026) was a Czech traveler and writer.

== Life and career ==
Šimánek was born in Choceň, Czechoslovakia (now the Czech Republic). He studied civil engineering and left communist Czechoslovakia in 1968. He settled in Germany where he worked in the construction industry. He was given German citizenship. Later, he also obtained Canadian citizenship. He returned to Czechoslovakia after the Velvet Revolution in 1990. He traveled all over the world since 1970s and wrote many books about his journeys.

Šimánek died on 9 March 2026, at the age of 79.
