= Čermná nad Orlicí =

- Municipality
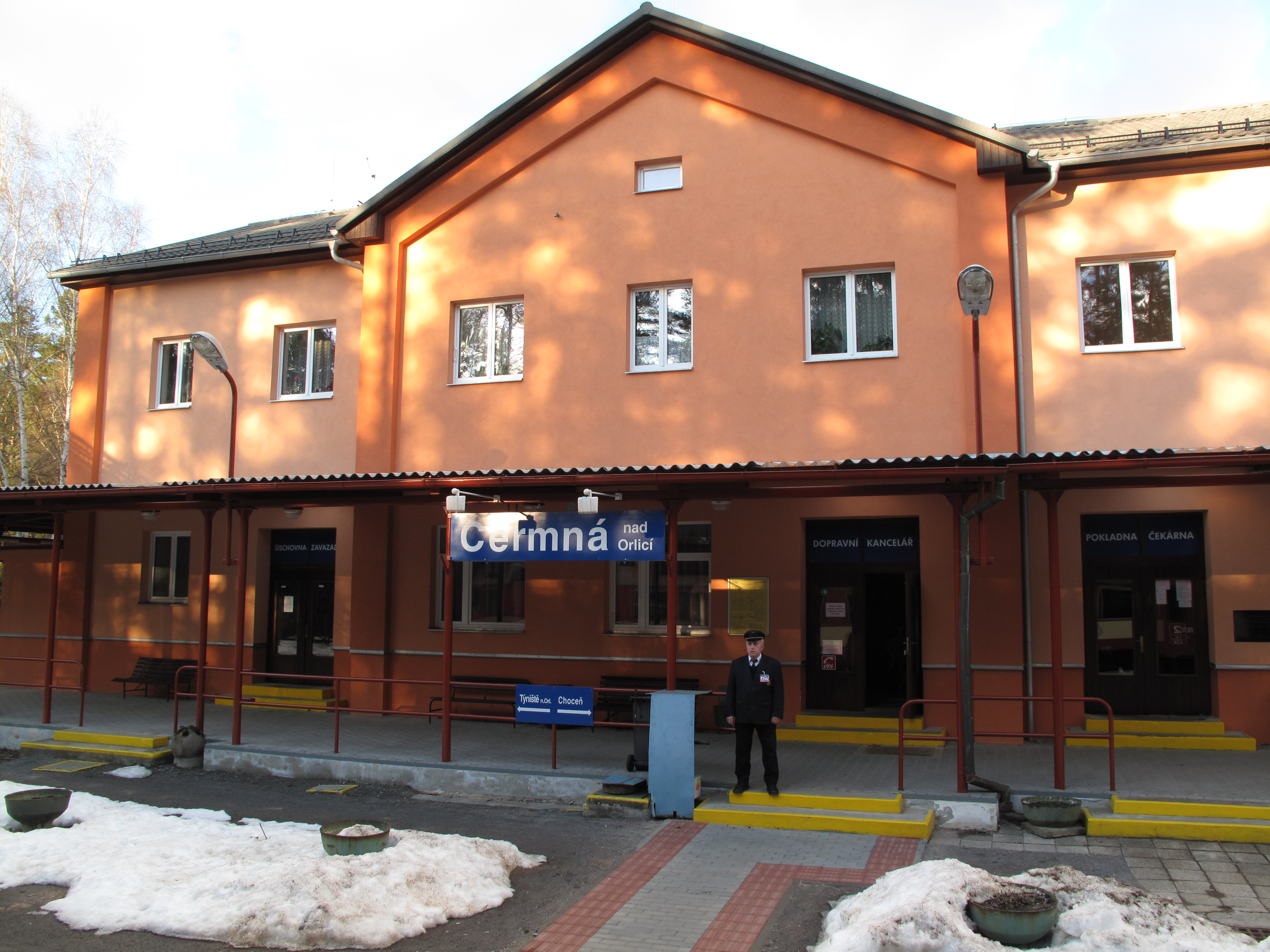
- Train station

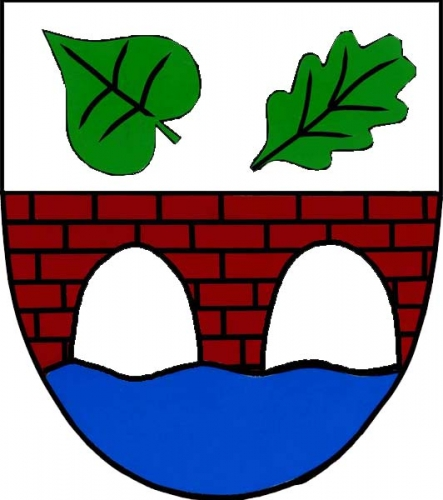
- Flag Coat of arms

- Location in the Czech Republic
- Coordinates: 50°4′35″N 16°7′56″E
- Country: Czech Republic
- Region: Hradec Králové
- District: Rychnov nad Kněžnou
- First mentioned: 1342

Area
  - Total: 10.98 km^{2} (4.24 sq mi)
- Elevation: 261 m (856 ft)

Population (2026-01-01)
  - Total: 1,099
  - Density: 100.1/km^{2} (259.2/sq mi)
- Time zone: UTC+1 (CET)
  - Summer (DST): UTC+2 (CEST)
- Postal code: 517 25
- Website: www.cermna-n-orl.cz

Čermná nad Orlicí (German: Tscherma an der Adler) is a municipality in Rychnov nad Kněžnou District in the Hradec Králové Region of the Czech Republic. It has about 1,100 inhabitants. It lies on both banks of the Tichá Orlice River.

== Administrative division ==
Čermná nad Orlicí consists of four municipal parts (in brackets population according to the 2021 census):

- Malá Čermná (608)
- Velká Čermná (294)
- Číčová (102)
- Korunka (24)

== Demographics ==
Historical population
Year	Pop.	±%
1869	1,253	—
1880	1,317	+5.1%
1890	1,301	−1.2%
1900	1,147	−11.8%
1910	1,360	+18.6%
1921	1,279	−6.0%
1930	1,427	+11.6%
1950	1,100	−22.9%
1961	1,215	+10.5%
1970	1,070	−11.9%
1980	1,025	−4.2%
1991	955	−6.8%
2001	996	+4.3%
2011	954	−4.2%
2021	1,028	+7.8%
Source: Censuses
