= Jamné nad Orlicí =

- Municipality
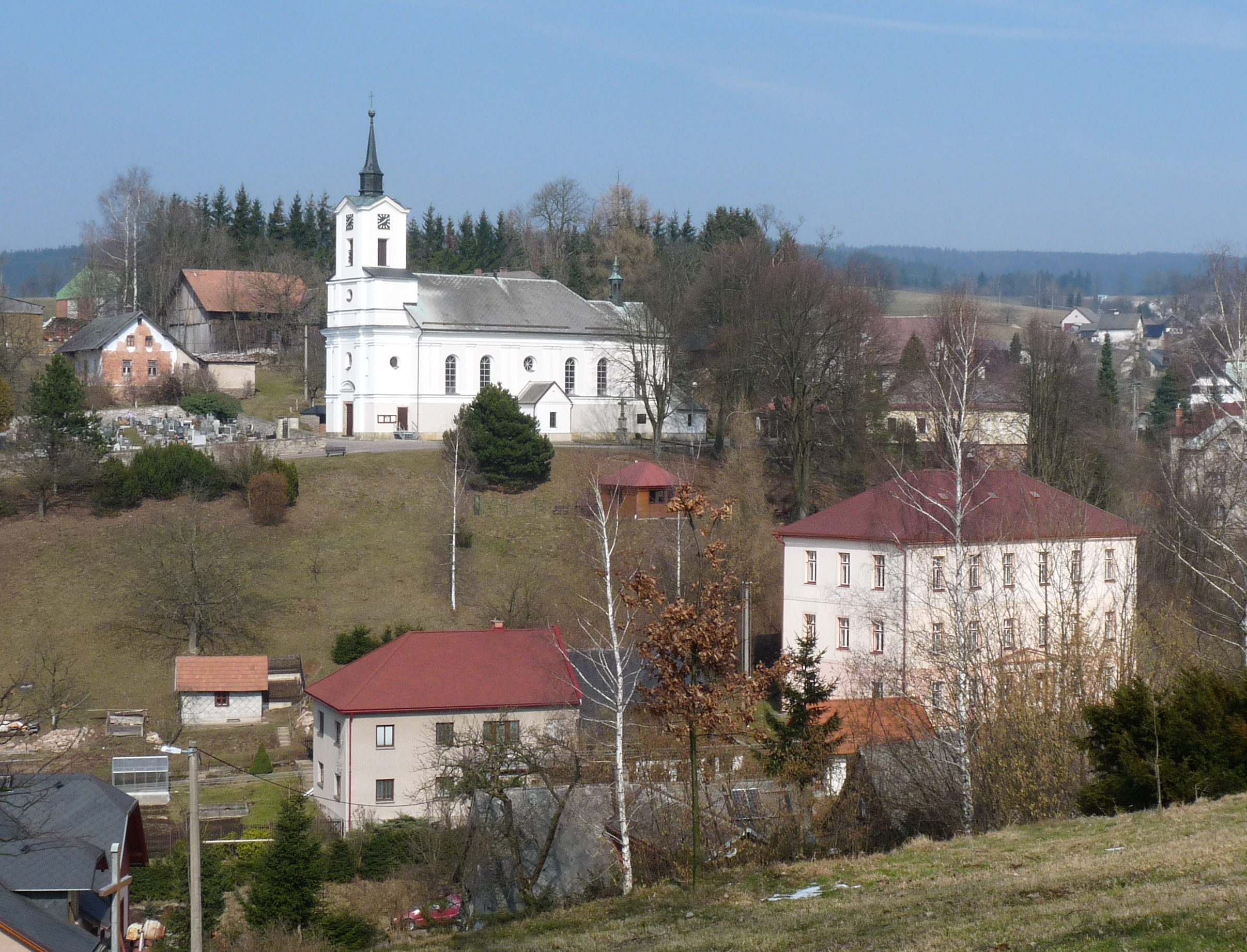
- Church of the Holy Trinity above the school

- Flag Coat of arms

- Location in the Czech Republic
- Coordinates: 50°2′23″N 16°37′59″E
- Country: Czech Republic
- Region: Pardubice
- District: Ústí nad Orlicí
- First mentioned: 1409

Area
  - Total: 10.59 km^{2} (4.09 sq mi)
- Elevation: 596 m (1,955 ft)

Population (2026-01-01)
  - Total: 738
  - Density: 69.7/km^{2} (180/sq mi)
- Time zone: UTC+1 (CET)
  - Summer (DST): UTC+2 (CEST)
- Postal code: 561 65
- Website: www.jamne.cz

Jamné nad Orlicí is a municipality and village in Ústí nad Orlicí District in the Pardubice Region of the Czech Republic. It has about 700 inhabitants.

== Demographics ==
Historical population
Year	Pop.	±%
1869	1,501	—
1880	1,555	+3.6%
1890	1,757	+13.0%
1900	1,605	−8.7%
1910	1,468	−8.5%
1921	1,331	−9.3%
1930	1,237	−7.1%
1950	764	−38.2%
1961	794	+3.9%
1970	720	−9.3%
1980	738	+2.5%
1991	678	−8.1%
2001	721	+6.3%
2011	675	−6.4%
2021	691	+2.4%
Source: Censuses
