= Mistrovice =

- Municipality
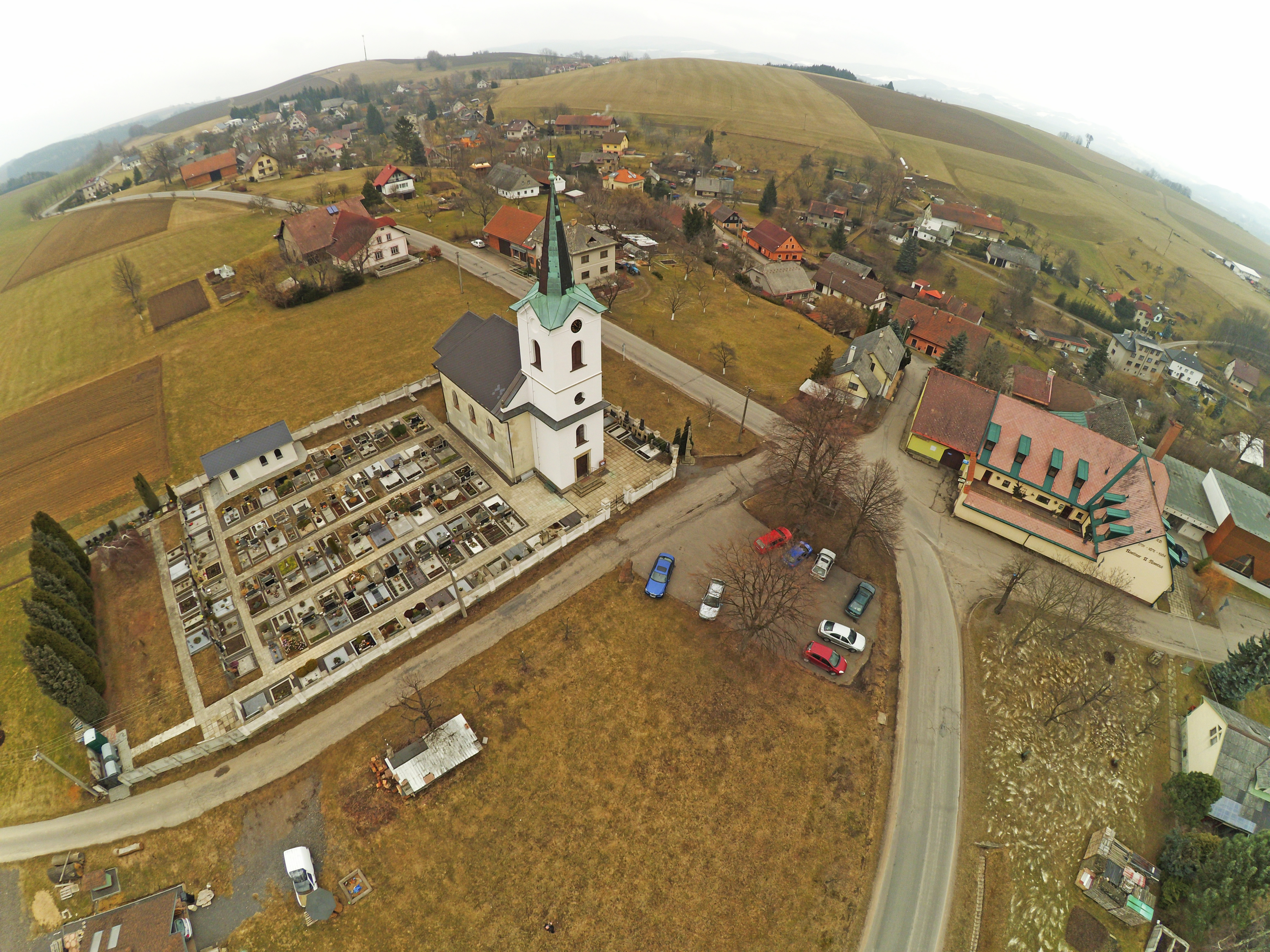
- Aerial view of Mistrovice with Church of Saints John and Paul

- Flag Coat of arms

- Location in the Czech Republic
- Coordinates: 50°1′25″N 16°34′18″E
- Country: Czech Republic
- Region: Pardubice
- District: Ústí nad Orlicí
- First mentioned: 1371

Area
  - Total: 4.61 km^{2} (1.78 sq mi)
- Elevation: 472 m (1,549 ft)

Population (2026-01-01)
  - Total: 654
  - Density: 142/km^{2} (367/sq mi)
- Time zone: UTC+1 (CET)
  - Summer (DST): UTC+2 (CEST)
- Postal code: 561 64
- Website: www.mistrovice.cz

Mistrovice (German: Meistersdorf) is a municipality and village in Ústí nad Orlicí District in the Pardubice Region of the Czech Republic. It has about 700 inhabitants.

== Etymology ==
The name is derived from the surname Mistr, meaning "the village of Mistr's people".

== Demographics ==
Historical population
Year	Pop.	±%
1869	794	—
1880	819	+3.1%
1890	744	−9.2%
1900	734	−1.3%
1910	723	−1.5%
1921	745	+3.0%
1930	684	−8.2%
1950	545	−20.3%
1961	547	+0.4%
1970	509	−6.9%
1980	568	+11.6%
1991	549	−3.3%
2001	578	+5.3%
2011	609	+5.4%
2021	575	−5.6%
Source: Censuses
