= Brandýs nad Orlicí =

- Town
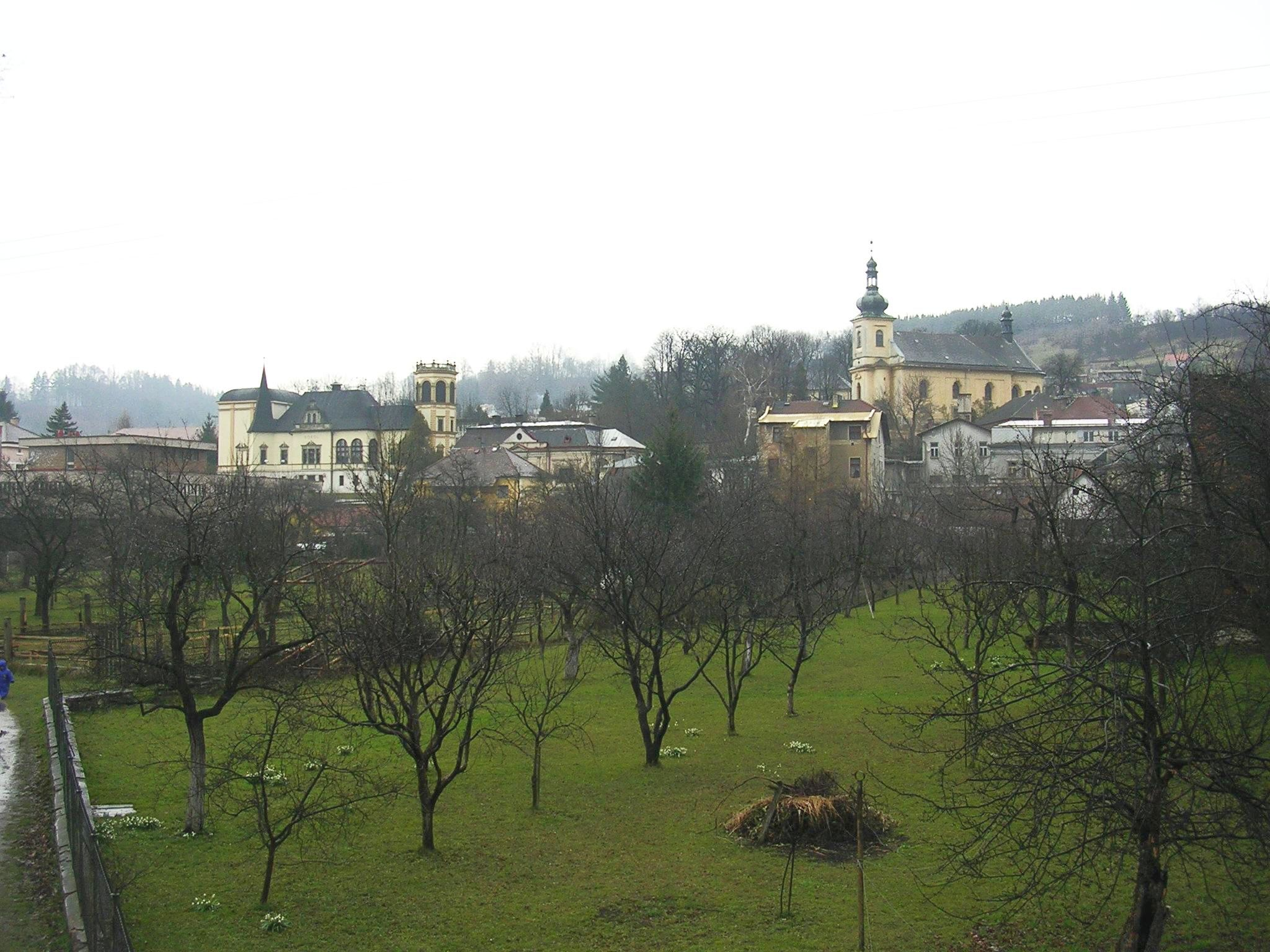
- General view of the town

- Flag Coat of arms

- Location in the Czech Republic
- Coordinates: 50°0′7″N 16°17′7″E
- Country: Czech Republic
- Region: Pardubice
- District: Ústí nad Orlicí
- First mentioned: 1227

Government
  - Mayor: Roman Buchtel

Area
  - Total: 4.33 km^{2} (1.67 sq mi)
- Elevation: 305 m (1,001 ft)

Population (2026-01-01)
  - Total: 1,293
  - Density: 299/km^{2} (773/sq mi)
- Time zone: UTC+1 (CET)
  - Summer (DST): UTC+2 (CEST)
- Postal code: 561 12
- Website: www.mesto-brandys.cz

Brandýs nad Orlicí (Czech pronunciation: [ˈbrandiːs ˈnat orlɪtsiː]; German: Brandeis an der Adler) is a town in Ústí nad Orlicí District in the Pardubice Region of the Czech Republic. It has about 1,300 inhabitants. The town is located on the Tichá Orlice River in the Svitavy Uplands.

The historic town centre is well preserved and is protected as an urban monument zone. The main landmarks of the town are the Brandýs nad Orlicí Castle and the Church of the Assumption of the Virgin Mary.

== Etymology ==
According to one theory, the name Brandýs was derived from branný hrad (meaning 'defensive castle'). According to another theory, the name was derived from the personal name Brant.

== Geography ==
Brandýs nad Orlicí is located about 8 kilometres (5 mi) northwest of Ústí nad Orlicí and 35 km (22 mi) east of Pardubice. It lies in the Svitavy Uplands. The highest point is at 430 m (1,411 ft) above sea level. The town is situated on the right bank of the Tichá Orlice River.

== History ==
The first written mention is from 1227 when Loukoť, a part of Brandýs nad Orlicí, was mentioned. At the end of the 13th century, a large castle was built here. In the second half of the 15th century, Brandýs nad Orlicí became the significant centre of the Moravian Church. During the rule of the Pernštejn family in 1507, the castle was demolished.

From 1652 to 1806, the town was owned by the Trautmannsdorf family. The family had a castle and the Church of the Assumption of Jesus built here. In the second half of the 19th century, the railway was built and Brandýs nad Orlicí became a popular resort visited by many famous people. In 1898, the rehabilitation institute was established.

== Demographics ==
Historical population

Year	Pop.	±%
1869	1,230	—
1880	1,274	+3.6%
1890	1,167	−8.4%
1900	1,118	−4.2%
1910	1,217	+8.9%

Year	Pop.	±%
1921	1,278	+5.0%
1930	1,428	+11.7%
1950	1,528	+7.0%
1961	1,499	−1.9%
1970	1,462	−2.5%

Year	Pop.	±%
1980	1,465	+0.2%
1991	1,494	+2.0%
2001	1,438	−3.7%
2011	1,377	−4.2%
2021	1,277	−7.3%

Source: Censuses

== Transport ==
Brandýs nad Orlicí is located on the railway line Pardubice–Česká Třebová.

== Sights ==
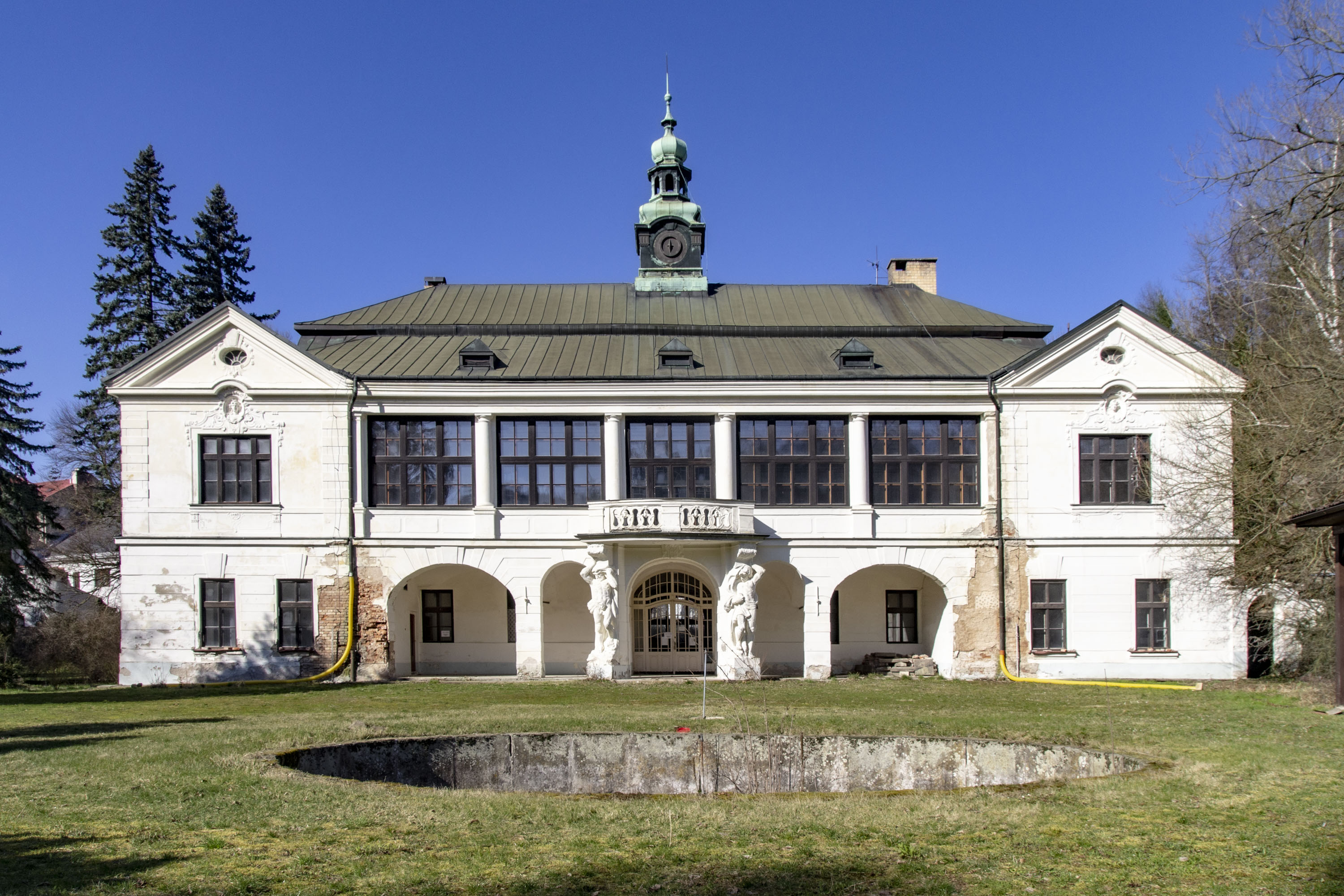
Brandýs nad Orlicí Castle

The Brandýs nad Orlicí Castle was built in 1781–1783, originally in the Baroque style. In 1818–1820, it was rebuilt in the Neoclassical style, and in 1914 in the Neo-Baroque style. Today it is privately owned and gradually reconstructed.

The ruins of the former medieval Gothic castle are preserved and are open to the public.

Among the main landmarks of the town is the Church of the Assumption of the Virgin Mary. It was built in the late Baroque style in 1787–1788.

== Notable people ==
- John Jiskra of Brandýs (c. 1400 – c. 1469), strategist and mercenary soldier
- Jaromír Zápal (1923–1984), illustrator
