= Verměřovice =

- Municipality
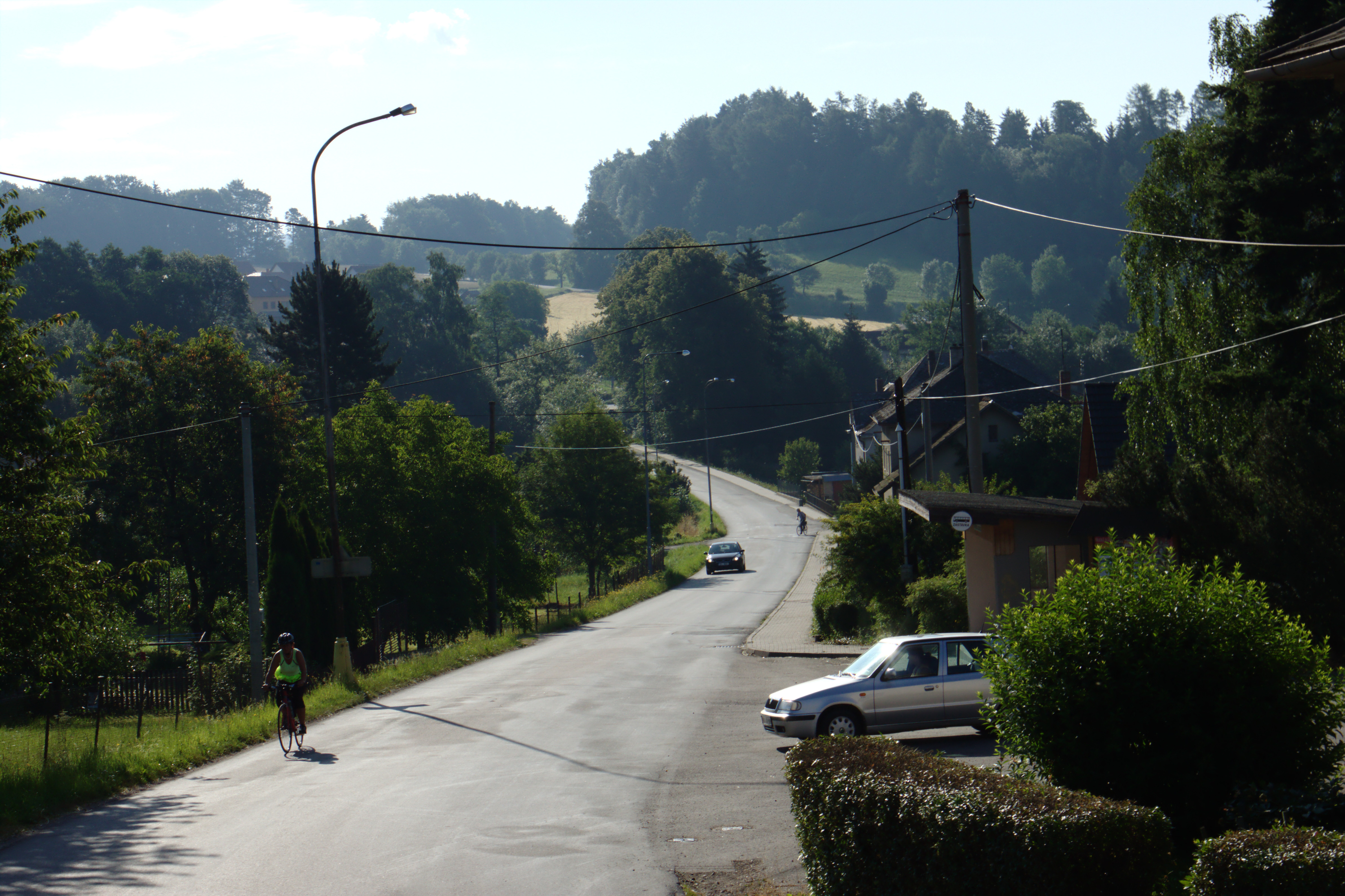
- Main road

- Flag Coat of arms

- Location in the Czech Republic
- Coordinates: 50°0′20″N 16°33′45″E
- Country: Czech Republic
- Region: Pardubice
- District: Ústí nad Orlicí
- First mentioned: 1304

Area
  - Total: 5.99 km^{2} (2.31 sq mi)
- Elevation: 384 m (1,260 ft)

Population (2026-01-01)
  - Total: 787
  - Density: 131/km^{2} (340/sq mi)
- Time zone: UTC+1 (CET)
  - Summer (DST): UTC+2 (CEST)
- Postal code: 561 52
- Website: www.vermerovice.cz

Verměřovice (German: Wetzdorf) is a municipality and village in Ústí nad Orlicí District in the Pardubice Region of the Czech Republic. It has about 800 inhabitants.

Verměřovice lies approximately 13 kilometres (8 mi) east of Ústí nad Orlicí, 57 km (35 mi) east of Pardubice, and 154 km (96 mi) east of Prague.

== Demographics ==
Historical population
Year	Pop.	±%
1869	671	—
1880	704	+4.9%
1890	691	−1.8%
1900	721	+4.3%
1910	682	−5.4%
1921	651	−4.5%
1930	639	−1.8%
1950	541	−15.3%
1961	550	+1.7%
1970	567	+3.1%
1980	627	+10.6%
1991	631	+0.6%
2001	719	+13.9%
2011	727	+1.1%
2021	720	−1.0%
Source: Censuses
