= Sobkovice =

- Municipality
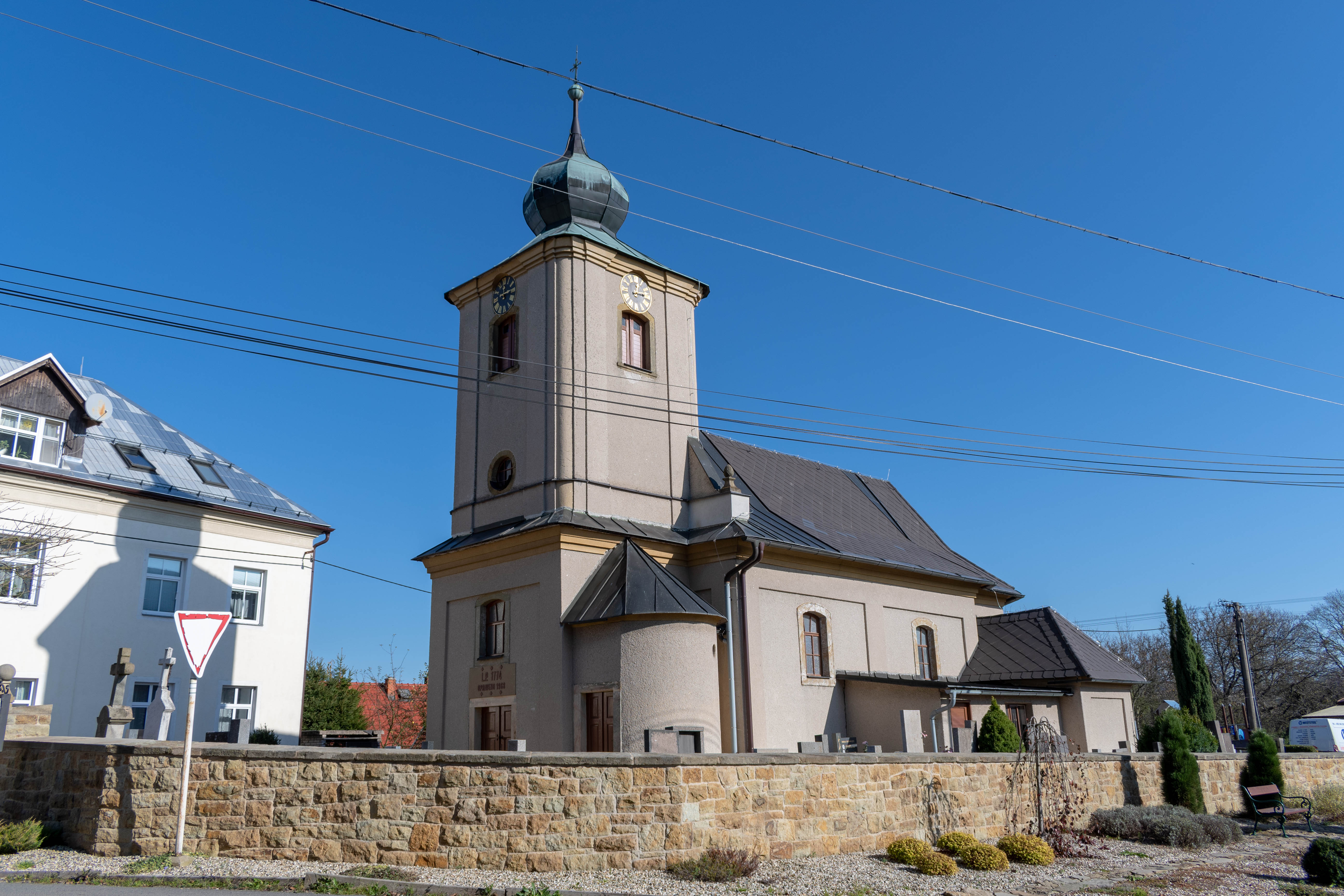
- Church of Saint Procopius

- Flag Coat of arms

- Location in the Czech Republic
- Coordinates: 50°2′53″N 16°35′42″E
- Country: Czech Republic
- Region: Pardubice
- District: Ústí nad Orlicí
- First mentioned: 1543

Area
  - Total: 3.66 km^{2} (1.41 sq mi)
- Elevation: 558 m (1,831 ft)

Population (2026-01-01)
  - Total: 262
  - Density: 71.6/km^{2} (185/sq mi)
- Time zone: UTC+1 (CET)
  - Summer (DST): UTC+2 (CEST)
- Postal code: 561 64
- Website: sobkovice.info

Sobkovice is a municipality and village in Ústí nad Orlicí District in the Pardubice Region of the Czech Republic. It has about 300 inhabitants.

Sobkovice lies approximately 17 kilometres (11 mi) north-east of Ústí nad Orlicí, 59 km (37 mi) east of Pardubice, and 156 km (97 mi) east of Prague.

== Demographics ==
Historical population
Year	Pop.	±%
1869	558	—
1880	618	+10.8%
1890	563	−8.9%
1900	522	−7.3%
1910	542	+3.8%
1921	538	−0.7%
1930	477	−11.3%
1950	349	−26.8%
1961	338	−3.2%
1970	299	−11.5%
1980	264	−11.7%
1991	246	−6.8%
2001	232	−5.7%
2011	250	+7.8%
2021	226	−9.6%
Source: Censuses
