= Orlické Podhůří =

- Municipality
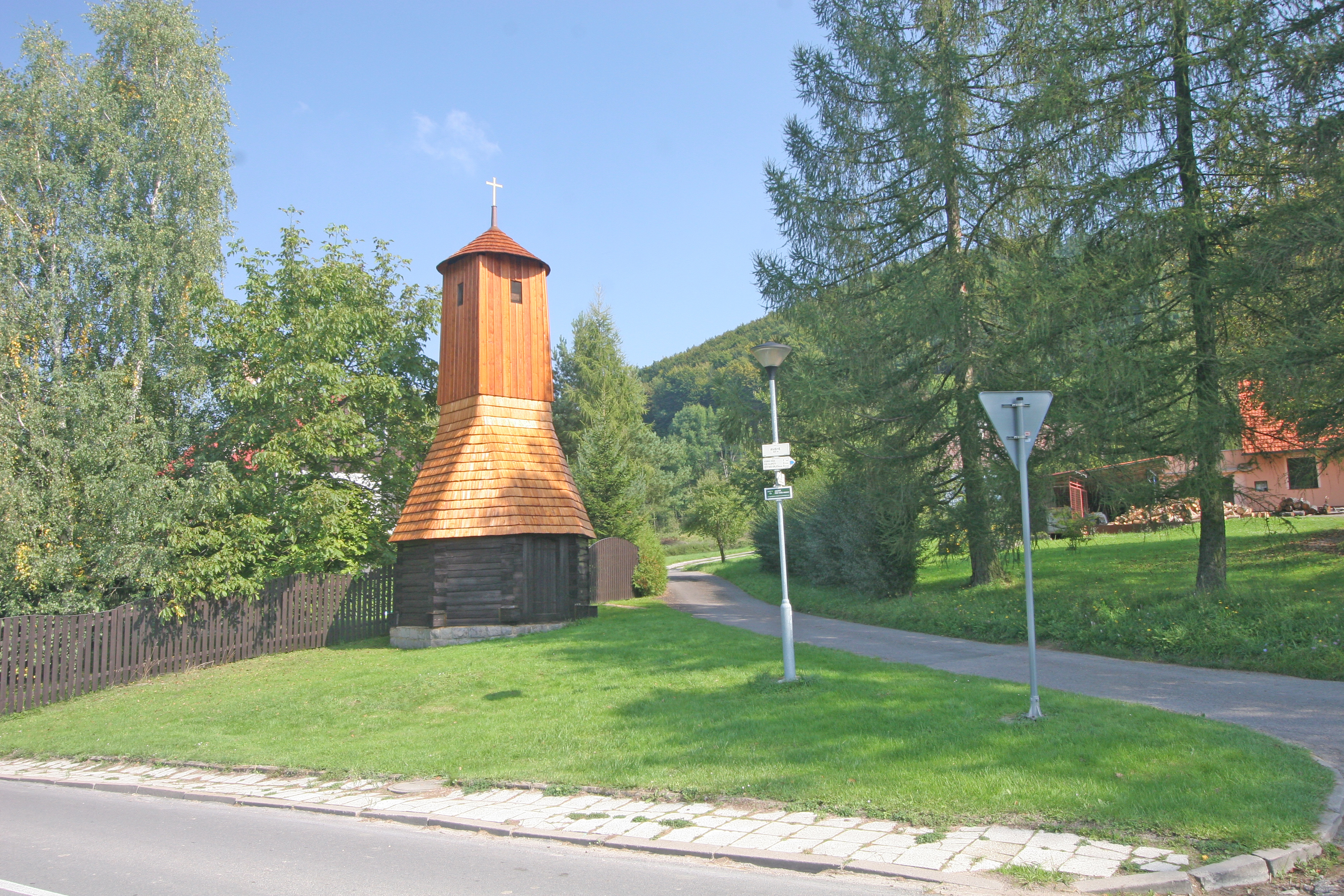
- Belfry in Rviště

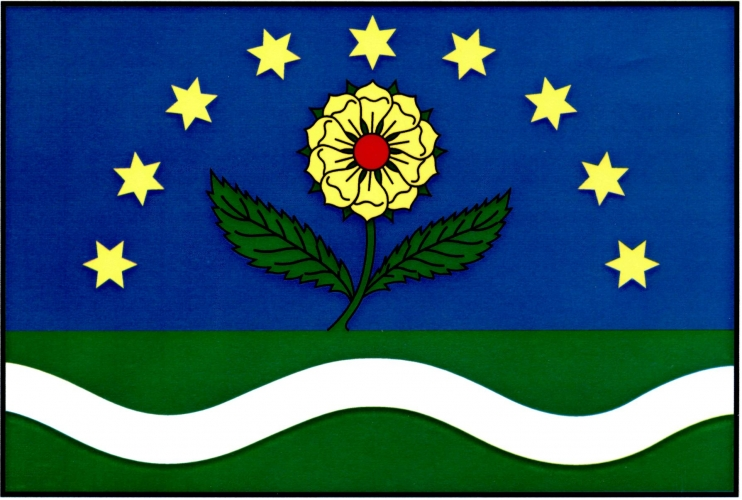
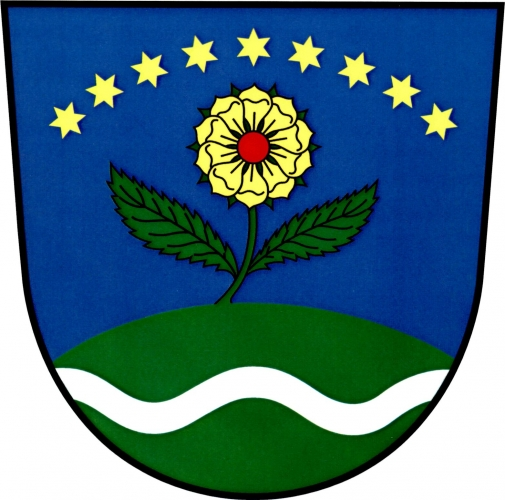
- Flag Coat of arms

- Location in the Czech Republic
- Coordinates: 49°59′24″N 16°21′26″E
- Country: Czech Republic
- Region: Pardubice
- District: Ústí nad Orlicí
- Established: 1960

Area
  - Total: 13.53 km^{2} (5.22 sq mi)
- Elevation: 426 m (1,398 ft)

Population (2026-01-01)
  - Total: 683
  - Density: 50.5/km^{2} (131/sq mi)
- Time zone: UTC+1 (CET)
  - Summer (DST): UTC+2 (CEST)
- Postal code: 562 01
- Website: www.orlickepodhuri.cz

Orlické Podhůří is a municipality in the Ústí nad Orlicí District in the Pardubice Region of the Czech Republic. It has about 700 inhabitants.

Orlické Podhůří lies approximately 6 kilometres (4 mi) north-west of Ústí nad Orlicí, 40 km (25 mi) east of Pardubice, and 138 km (86 mi) east of Prague.

== Administrative division ==
Orlické Podhůří consists of six municipal parts (in brackets population according to the 2021 census):

- Dobrá Voda (75)
- Kaliště (17)
- Perná (27)
- Říčky (339)
- Rozsocha (68)
- Rviště (112)

== Demographics ==
Historical population
| Year | Pop. | ±% |
|---|---|---|
| 1869 | 1,306 | — |
| 1880 | 1,328 | +1.7% |
| 1890 | 1,337 | +0.7% |
| 1900 | 1,203 | −10.0% |
| 1910 | 1,221 | +1.5% |
| 1921 | 1,157 | −5.2% |
| 1930 | 1,054 | −8.9% |
| 1950 | 835 | −20.8% |
| 1961 | 845 | +1.2% |
| 1970 | 803 | −5.0% |
| 1980 | 694 | −13.6% |
| 1991 | 561 | −19.2% |
| 2001 | 598 | +6.6% |
| 2011 | 585 | −2.2% |
| 2021 | 638 | +9.1% |
Source: Censuses
