= Petrovice (Ústí nad Orlicí District) =

- Municipality
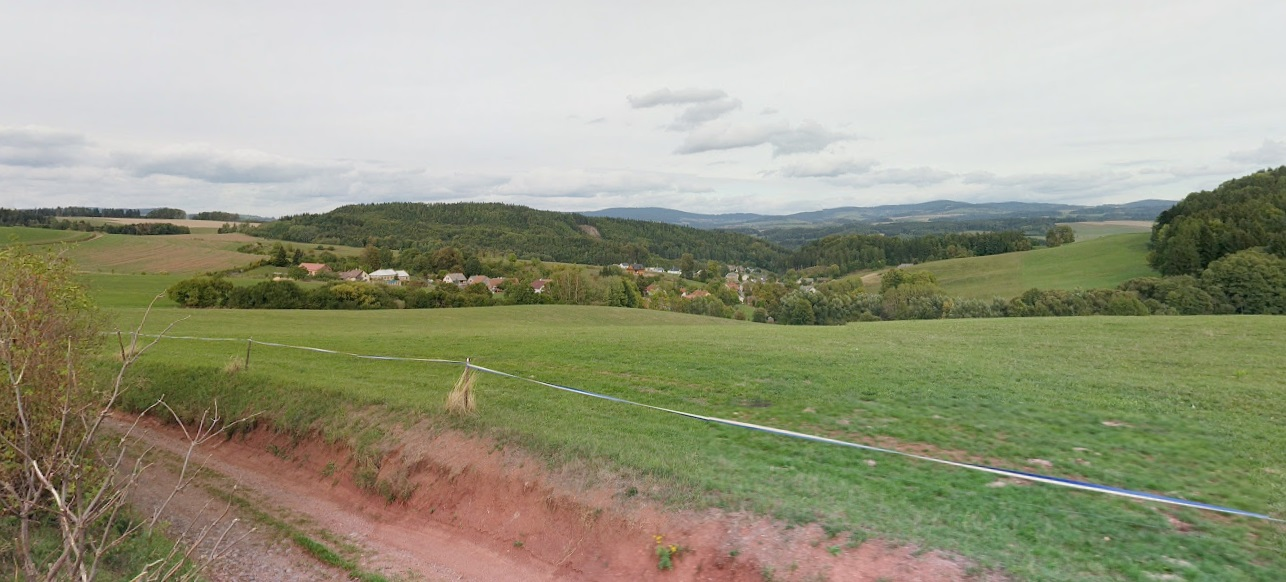
- General view

- Flag Coat of arms

- Location in the Czech Republic
- Coordinates: 49°59′17″N 16°32′30″E
- Country: Czech Republic
- Region: Pardubice
- District: Ústí nad Orlicí
- First mentioned: 1304

Area
  - Total: 2.63 km^{2} (1.02 sq mi)
- Elevation: 450 m (1,480 ft)

Population (2026-01-01)
  - Total: 270
  - Density: 100/km^{2} (270/sq mi)
- Time zone: UTC+1 (CET)
  - Summer (DST): UTC+2 (CEST)
- Postal code: 563 01
- Website: ou-petrovice.cz

Petrovice (German: Petersdorf) is a municipality and village in Ústí nad Orlicí District in the Pardubice Region of the Czech Republic. It has about 300 inhabitants.

Petrovice lies approximately 11 kilometres (7 mi) east of Ústí nad Orlicí, 55 km (34 mi) east of Pardubice, and 153 km (95 mi) east of Prague.

== Demographics ==
Historical population
Year	Pop.	±%
1869	360	—
1880	370	+2.8%
1890	353	−4.6%
1900	331	−6.2%
1910	319	−3.6%
1921	286	−10.3%
1930	273	−4.5%
1950	225	−17.6%
1961	241	+7.1%
1970	232	−3.7%
1980	232	+0.0%
1991	238	+2.6%
2001	238	+0.0%
2011	235	−1.3%
2021	249	+6.0%
Source: Censuses
