= Jaromír Zápal =

- Born: 18 March 1923; Brandýs nad Orlicí, Czechoslovakia
- Died: 5 December 1984 (aged 61); Prague, Czechoslovakia
- Known for: Illustration, painting, writing

Jaromír Zápal (18 March 1923 – 5 December 1984) was a Czech illustrator, painter and writer. He is mainly known as an illustrator of children books.

== Life and career ==
Zápal was born on 18 March 1923 in Brandýs nad Orlicí. He studied at the Academy of Arts, Architecture and Design in Prague. Later he worked as a graphics art editor for publishing houses Státní nakladatelství dětské knihy (SNDK), which in 1969 became Albatros, publishers for children and youth, i. e. specializing on children and youth literature. Among his most known works are the rendition of Winnie the Pooh (first published in 1958) and illustrations for the Neznaika trilogy by Nikolai Nosov (first published in 1957, 1961 and 1976). Zápal also wrote and illustrated several child books (the last being published posthumously in 1986).

== Literature ==
- František Holešovský, Blanka Stehlíková, Luboš Hlaváček: Čeští ilustrátoři v současné knize pro děti a mládež (Czech illustrators in contemporary literature for children and the youth), Albatros, Prague, 1989.
