= Choceň =

- Town
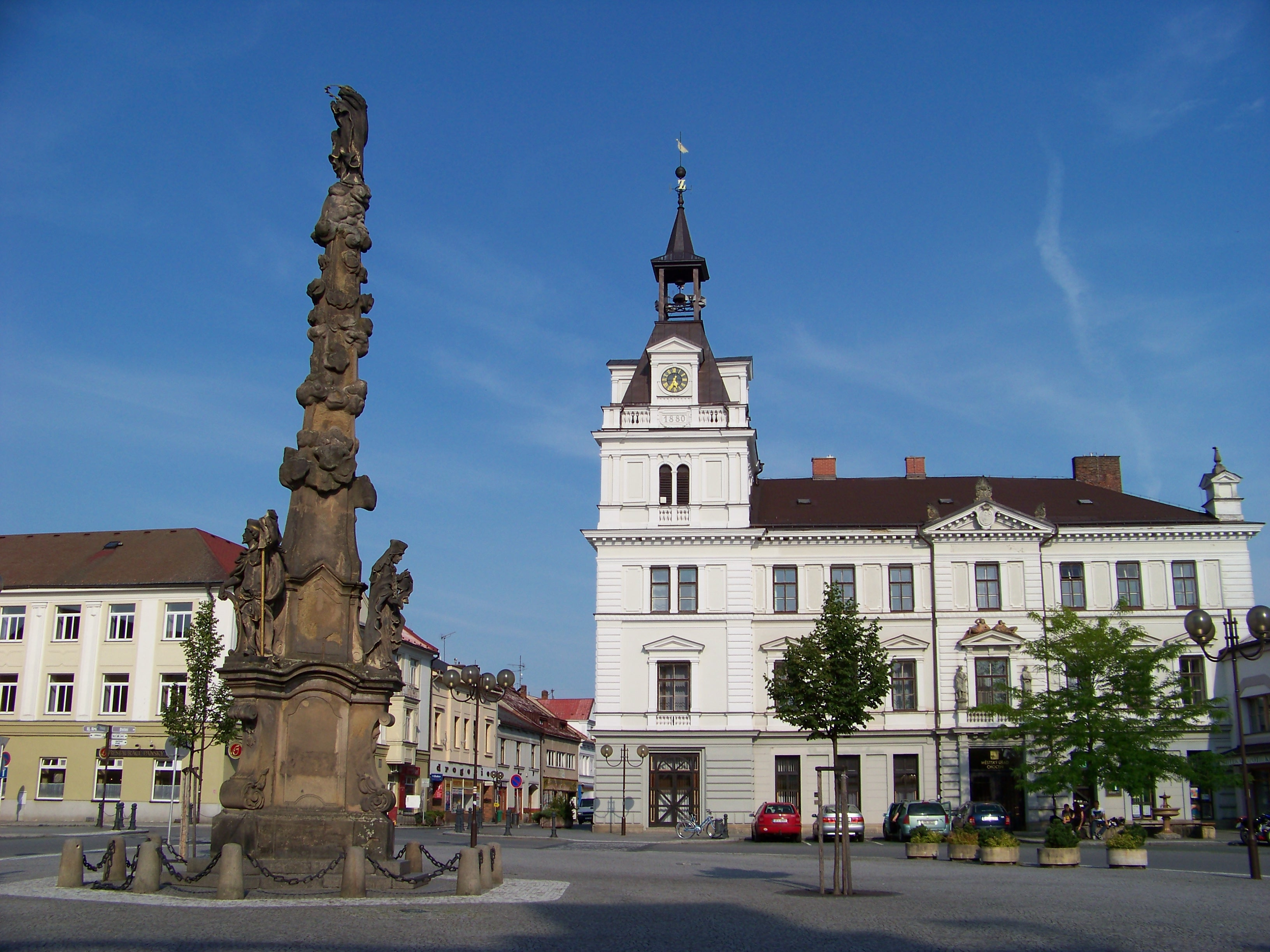
- The square Tyršovo náměstí with the town hall

- Flag Coat of arms

- Location in the Czech Republic
- Coordinates: 50°0′6″N 16°13′23″E
- Country: Czech Republic
- Region: Pardubice
- District: Ústí nad Orlicí
- First mentioned: 1227

Government
  - Mayor: Jan Pažin

Area
  - Total: 21.69 km^{2} (8.37 sq mi)
- Elevation: 290 m (950 ft)

Population (2026-01-01)
  - Total: 8,700
  - Density: 400/km^{2} (1,000/sq mi)
- Time zone: UTC+1 (CET)
  - Summer (DST): UTC+2 (CEST)
- Postal code: 565 01
- Website: www.chocen-mesto.cz

Choceň (Czech pronunciation: [ˈxotsɛɲ]; German: Chotzen) is a town in Ústí nad Orlicí District in the Pardubice Region of the Czech Republic. It has about 8,700 inhabitants. The town is located on the Tichá Orlice River in the Orlice Table. It is a railway junction. The main landmarks of Choceň are the Church of Saint Francis of Assisi and the Choceň Castle.

== Administrative division ==
Choceň consists of seven municipal parts (in brackets population according to the 2021 census):

- Choceň (7,928)
- Březenice (46)
- Dvořisko (187)
- Hemže (118)
- Nová Ves (19)
- Plchůvky (85)
- Podrážek (39)

Nová Ves and Plchůvky form an exclave of the municipal territory.

== Etymology ==
The name is derived from the personal name Chocen, meaning "Chocen's (court)".

== Geography ==
Choceň is located about 13 kilometres (8 mi) west of Ústí nad Orlicí and 31 km (19 mi) east of Pardubice. It lies in the Orlice Table. The highest point is at 354 m (1,161 ft) above sea level. The Tichá Orlice River flows through the town.

== History ==
The first written mention of Choceň is from 1227. In 1292, it was already a market town and was owned by King Wenceslaus II. In the early 14th century, it was acquired by Mikuláš of Potštejn, who founded a castle here. Mikuláš undertook marauding expeditions to the surrounding area. In 1339, the army of Charles IV conquered Choceň, demolished the castle and killed Mikuláš.

During next centuries, Choceň often changed owners. During the rule of Zikmund of Šelmberk, the town experienced a boom. He had a castle with a large courtyard built here in 1562. The next boom was during the rule of the Kinsky family in the 18th century. Several architectionally valuable Baroque buildings were built here, including the new Church of Saint Francis of Assisi, the rectory and the belfry.

In 1845, the railway from Prague to Olomouc via Choceň was built. In 1875 and 1881 the railways to Broumov and Litomyšl were built and Choceň became an important railway junction.

== Demographics ==
Historical population

Year	Pop.	±%
1869	3,932	—
1880	4,340	+10.4%
1890	4,514	+4.0%
1900	4,981	+10.3%
1910	5,673	+13.9%

Year	Pop.	±%
1921	5,771	+1.7%
1930	6,998	+21.3%
1950	7,511	+7.3%
1961	8,566	+14.0%
1970	8,710	+1.7%

Year	Pop.	±%
1980	9,716	+11.5%
1991	9,246	−4.8%
2001	9,039	−2.2%
2011	8,702	−3.7%
2021	8,422	−3.2%

Source: Censuses

== Economy ==
The largest industrial employer based in the town is Autoneum CZ, a manufacturer of automotive parts with more than 500 employees. The town is known for its dairy company Choceňská mlékárna, which was founded in 1928.

== Transport ==
Choceň railway station is situated on the main railway lines from Prague to Brno via Pardubice and Ústí nad Orlicí and from Prague to Luhačovice via Olomouc. Choceň is also the terminus of the lines from Náchod, Vysoké Mýto and Litomyšl.

== Sights ==
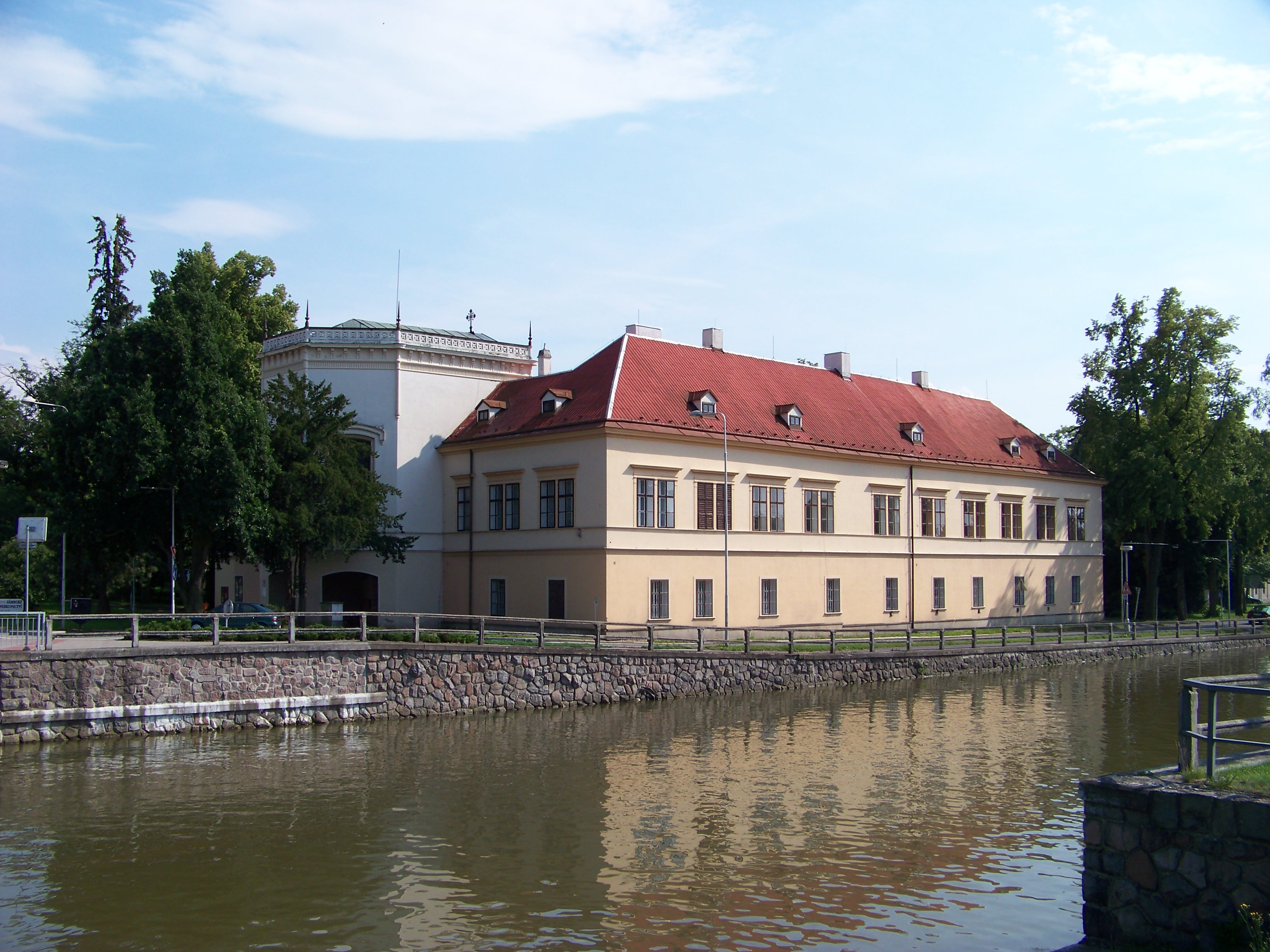
Choceň Castle

The Choceň Castle dates from 1562. It was originally a Renaissance building, rebuilt in the Baroque style in 1710–1720, and then to its current Neoclassical form in 1829, after it was damaged by a fire. The neo-Gothic Chapel of the Assumption of the Virgin Mary was added to the castle in 1849–1850. Today the castle houses the Orlické Museum.

The Church of Saint Francis of Assisi was built in the Baroque style in 1728–1733, after the old Gothic church was destroyed by a fire. The church has a separate bell tower, built in 1702–1703.

== Notable people ==
- Tomáš Norbert Koutník (1698–1775), composer
- Wenzel Thomas Matiegka (1773–1830), composer
- Ulrich, 10th Prince Kinsky of Wchinitz and Tettau (1893–1938), nobleman
- Richard Rychtarik (1894–1982), Czech-American set and costume designer
- Jaroslav Malátek (1923–2014), painter
- Leoš Šimánek (1946–2026), traveller and writer
- Ivana Andrlová (born 1960), actress
- František Sisr (born 1993), cyclist
