= Březná =

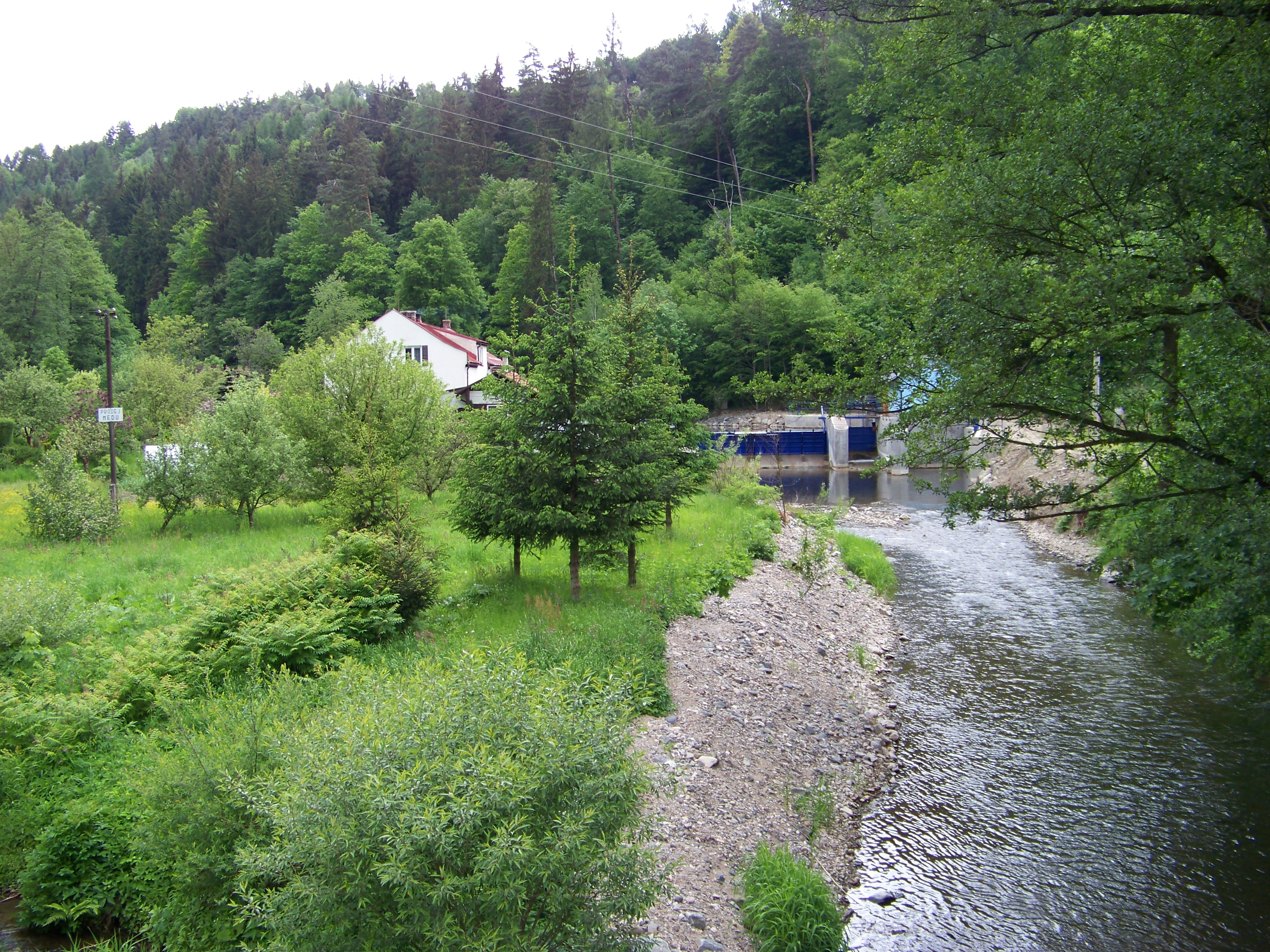
- The Březná in Hoštejn

Location
- Country: Czech Republic
- Regions: Pardubice; Olomouc

Physical characteristics
- Source
  - location: Malá Morava, Hanušovice Highlands
  - coordinates: 50°3′2″N 16°50′46″E
  - elevation: 850 m (2,790 ft)
- Mouth
  - location: Moravská Sázava
  - coordinates: 49°52′27″N 16°46′10″E
  - elevation: 308 m (1,010 ft)
- Length: 31.8 km (19.8 mi)
- Basin size: 130.3 km^{2} (50.3 sq mi)
- Discharge
  - average: 1.73 m^{3}/s (61 cu ft/s) near estuary

Basin features
- Progression: Moravská Sázava→ Morava→ Danube→ Black Sea

The Březná is a river in the Czech Republic, a left tributary of the Moravská Sázava River. It flows through the Olomouc and Pardubice regions. It is 31.8 km (19.8 mi) long.

== Characteristic ==
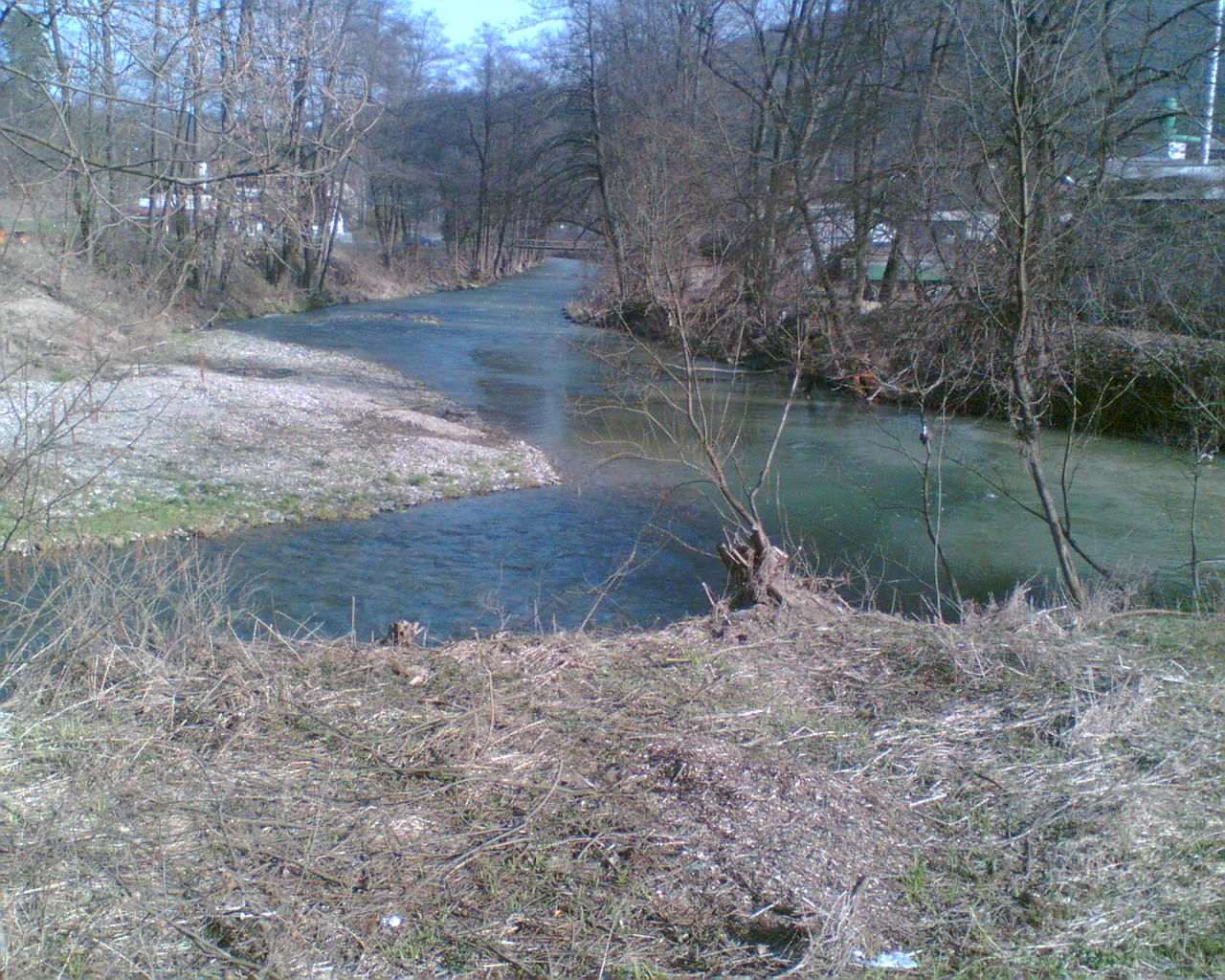
Confluence of the Moravská Sázava and Březná

The Březná originates in the territory of Malá Morava in the Hanušovice Highlands at the elevation of 850 m (2,790 ft) and flows to Hoštejn, where it enters the Moravská Sázava River at an elevation of 308 m (1,010 ft). It is 31.8 km (19.8 mi) long. Its drainage basin has an area of 130.3 km^{2} (50.3 sq mi).

The longest tributaries of the Březná are:

Tributary	Length (km)	Side
Červenovodský potok	5.8	right
Čistá	5.5	left

== Course ==
The river flows through the municipal territories of Malá Morava, Písařov, Červená Voda, Štíty, Jedlí, Drozdov, Cotkytle, Tatenice and Hoštejn.

== Protection of nature ==
The river flows through the Březná Nature Park, named after the river. The Březná River creates distinct, deep and symmetrical valleys in the nature park.

== Tourism ==
The spring of the river is called Rudolf Spring. It is a tourist destination. The water coming out of the spring is slightly radioactive.

== See also ==
- List of rivers of the Czech Republic
