= Sklené =

Sklené may refer to places:

== Czech Republic ==
- Sklené (Svitavy District), a municipality and village in the Pardubice Region
- Sklené (Žďár nad Sázavou District), a municipality and village in the Vysočina Region
- Sklené, a village and part of Malá Morava in the Olomouc Region
- Sklené nad Oslavou, a municipality and village in the Vysočina Region

== Slovakia ==
- Sklené, Turčianske Teplice District, a municipality and village in the Žilina Region
