= Mezilesí =

Mezilesí may refer to places in the Czech Republic:

- Mezilesí (Náchod District), a municipality and village in the Hradec Králové Region
- Mezilesí (Pelhřimov District), a municipality and village in the Vysočina Region
- Mezilesí, a village and part of Čížkrajice in the South Bohemian Region
- Mezilesí, a village and part of Cotkytle in the Pardubice Region
- Mezilesí, a hamlet and part of Kryštofovy Hamry in the Liberec Region
