= Šanov =

Šanov may refer to places in the Czech Republic:

- Šanov (Rakovník District), a municipality and village in the Central Bohemian Region
- Šanov (Zlín District), a municipality and village in the Zlín Region
- Šanov (Znojmo District), a municipality and village in the South Moravian Region
- Šanov, a village and part of Červená Voda (Ústí nad Orlicí District) in the Pardubice Region
