= Štíty =

- Town
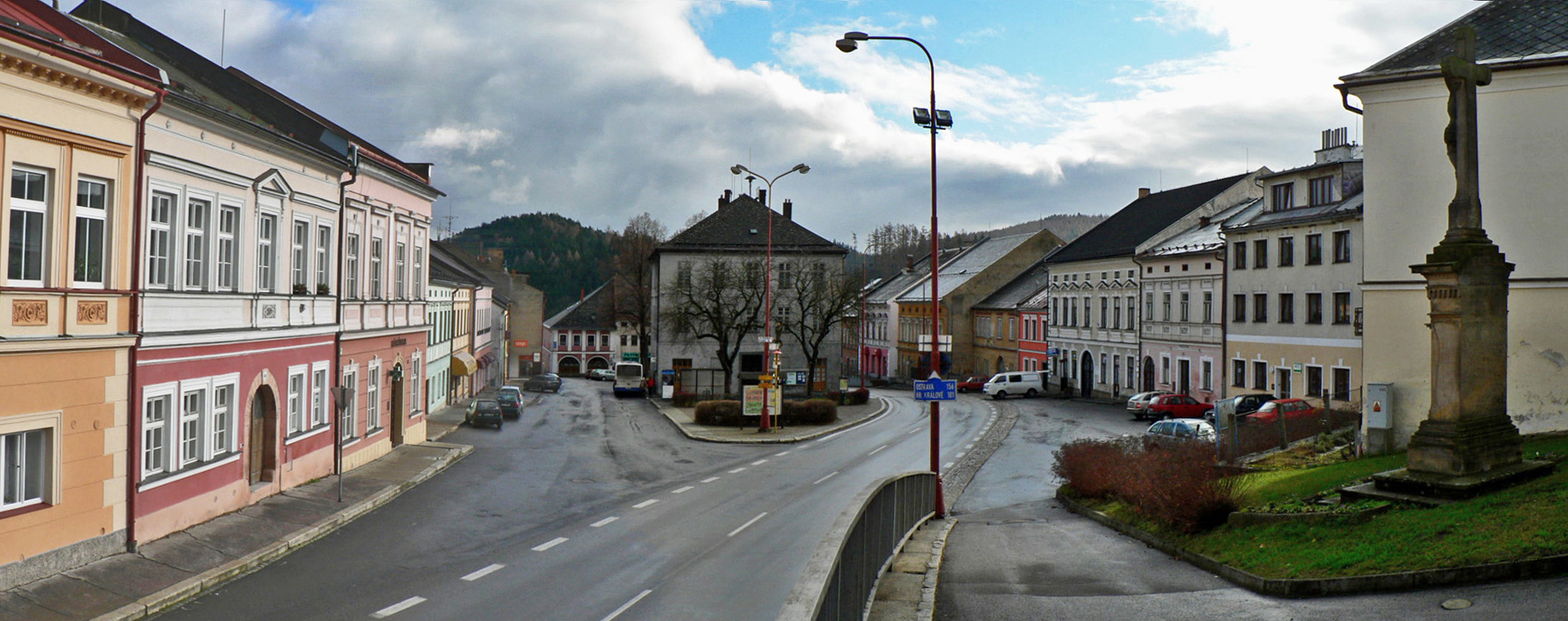
- View of Štíty

- Flag Coat of arms

- Location in the Czech Republic
- Coordinates: 49°57′40″N 16°45′57″E
- Country: Czech Republic
- Region: Olomouc
- District: Šumperk
- First mentioned: 1278

Government
  - Mayor: Jiří Vogel (ODS)

Area
  - Total: 29.93 km^{2} (11.56 sq mi)
- Elevation: 443 m (1,453 ft)

Population (2026-01-01)
  - Total: 1,892
  - Density: 63.21/km^{2} (163.7/sq mi)
- Time zone: UTC+1 (CET)
  - Summer (DST): UTC+2 (CEST)
- Postal code: 789 91
- Website: www.stity.cz

Štíty (Czech pronunciation: [ˈʃciːtɪ]; until 1949 Šilperk; German: Schildberg) is a town in Šumperk District in the Olomouc Region of the Czech Republic. It has about 1,900 inhabitants. The historic town centre is well preserved and is protected as an urban monument zone. Štíty is known for its freestyle skiing centre.

== Administrative division ==
Štíty consists of four municipal parts (in brackets population according to the 2021 census):

- Štíty (1,517)
- Březná (235)
- Crhov (72)
- Heroltice (89)

== Etymology ==
The original German name was Schildberg (meaning 'shield hill') and Šilperk in Czech (transcription from German). In 1947, the town was briefly renamed Žalkov, but soon changed its name to Štíty. This name is derived from the original one and literally means 'shields'.

== Geography ==
Štíty is located about 15 kilometres (9 mi) west of Šumperk and 53 km (33 mi) northwest of Olomouc. The municipal territory is divided between several geomorphological units. The southern part lies in the Zábřeh Highlands, the northwestern part lies in the southernmost tip of the Orlické Mountains, and the northeastern part lies in the Kłodzko Valley. A small northern part also extends into the Hanušovice Highlands. The highest point of Štíty is located near the top of the mountain Strážka at 831 m (2,726 ft) above sea level.

The historic centre of Štíty is situated on the promontory above the Březná river, which flows through the municipal territory and partly forms its southern border.

== History ==
The first written mention of Štíty is from 1278. From 1308, the village was owned by the Sternberg family, however, they often leased the town to another aristocratic families. In 1334, it was first referred to as a town. In the early 15th century, it was one of the largest settlements in the region. During the Hussite Wars, the originally purely German town was partially settled by Czechs.

In 1464, part of the Štíty estate was sold and joined to the Zábřeh estate. The second part was sold to Jan of Dalčice in 1480. During late 15th and early 16th century the town often changed its owners. In 1624, after the Battle of White Mountain, Štíty together with all his properties was confiscated from Jan Odkolek Jr. and assigned to the Liechtenstein family, who annexed it to the Ruda estate.

During the Thirty Years' War, the town was greatly devastated, especially by the Swedish troops in 1646, and the local castle was destroyed. In 1744, the town was completely burned down by the Prussian army.

During the rule of the Liechtensteins, the town remained a craft centre for its surroundings, but lost its previous significance. The Liechtensteins administered the town to the fall of feudal system in 1848. Due to the establishment of textile factories in other parts of the region in the second half of the 19th century, local crafts found themselves in crisis and the town became one of the poorest in the region, whose livelihood depended mainly on agriculture.

In 1938, Štíty was annexed by Nazi Germany and administered as part of the Reichsgau Sudetenland. After World War II, the German-speaking population was expelled.

== Demographics ==
Historical population

Year	Pop.	±%
1869	4,496	—
1880	4,396	−2.2%
1890	4,168	−5.2%
1900	3,887	−6.7%
1910	3,465	−10.9%

Year	Pop.	±%
1921	3,173	−8.4%
1930	3,025	−4.7%
1950	1,712	−43.4%
1961	1,821	+6.4%
1970	1,780	−2.3%

Year	Pop.	±%
1980	1,883	+5.8%
1991	1,993	+5.8%
2001	2,029	+1.8%
2011	2,007	−1.1%
2021	1,913	−4.7%

Source: Censuses

== Transport ==
The I/43 road from Brno and Svitavy to the Czech–Polish border in Králíky runs through the town.

The railway that starts here is unused.

== Sport ==
Štíty is known for its large freestyle skiing centre whose operator is the 2002 Olympic winner Aleš Valenta.

== Sights ==
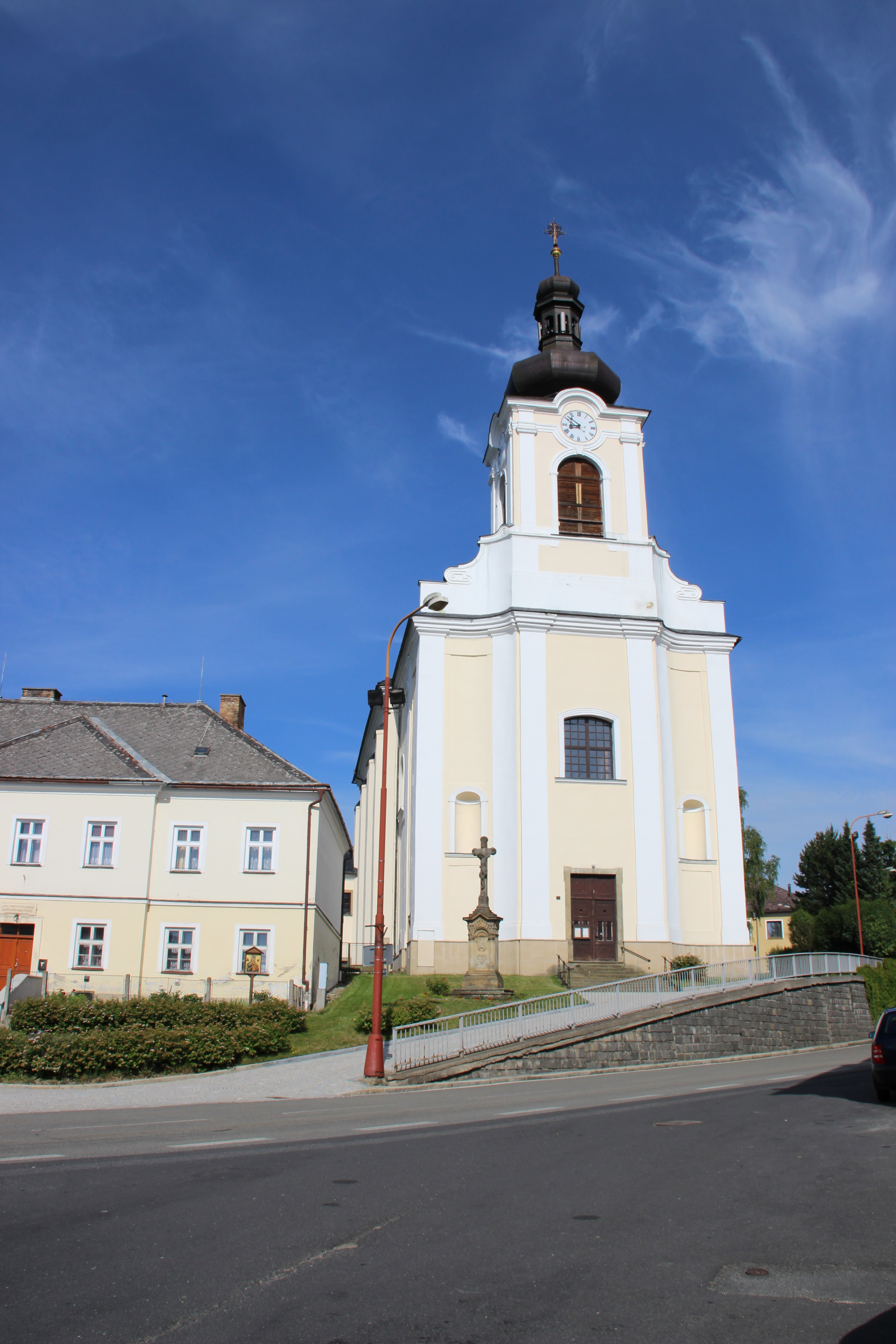
Church of the Assumption of the Virgin Mary

The main landmark of Štíty is the Church of the Assumption of the Virgin Mary. Its predecessor was a wooden church from the mid-13th century, destroyed by Prussian army in 1744. The church was replaced by the current late Baroque structure built in 1755. The one-storey stone building of the rectory dates from 1794.

The former town hall from the 16th century is one of the oldest houses in the town. This Renaissance building was modified into a Baroque burgher house in 1734. Today the house serves as a primary art school and the seat of various associations.

== Twin towns – sister cities ==
Štíty is twinned with:

- Belvedere Ostrense, Italy
- Niemodlin, Poland
