= Červená Voda (Ústí nad Orlicí District) =

- Municipality
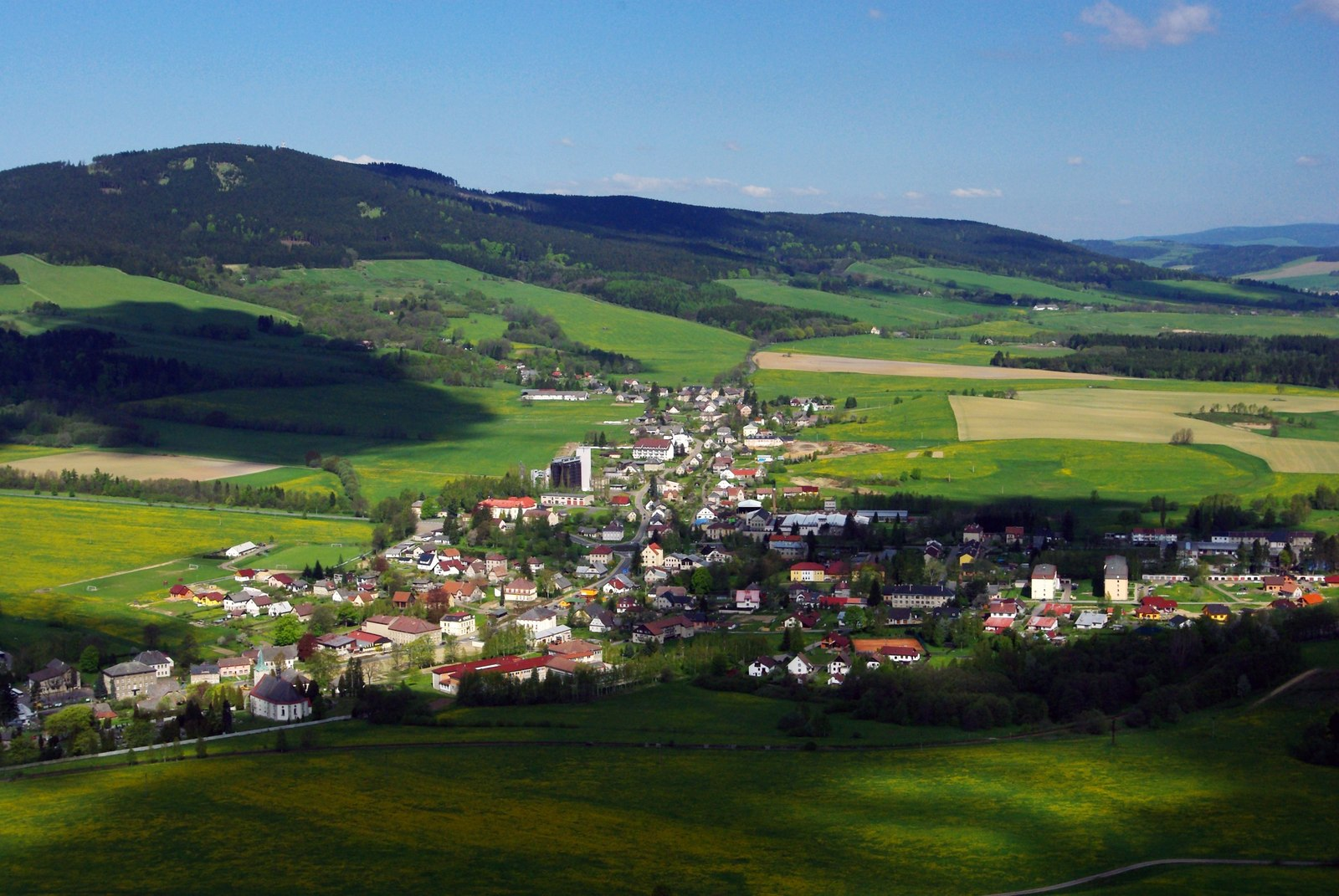
- General view of Červená Voda

- Flag Coat of arms

- Location in the Czech Republic
- Coordinates: 50°2′25″N 16°44′34″E
- Country: Czech Republic
- Region: Pardubice
- District: Ústí nad Orlicí
- First mentioned: 1481

Area
  - Total: 47.34 km^{2} (18.28 sq mi)
- Elevation: 530 m (1,740 ft)

Population (2026-01-01)
  - Total: 2,927
  - Density: 61.83/km^{2} (160.1/sq mi)
- Time zone: UTC+1 (CET)
  - Summer (DST): UTC+2 (CEST)
- Postal code: 561 61
- Website: www.cervenavoda.cz

Červená Voda (German: Mährisch Rothwasser) is a municipality and village in Ústí nad Orlicí District in the Pardubice Region of the Czech Republic. It has about 2,900 inhabitants.

== Administrative division ==
Červená Voda consists of eight municipal parts (in brackets population according to the 2021 census):

- Červená Voda (2,221)
- Bílá Voda (177)
- Dolní Orlice (170)
- Horní Orlice (25)
- Mlýnice (18)
- Mlýnický Dvůr (74)
- Moravský Karlov (68)
- Šanov (116)

== Etymology ==
The name Červená Voda means 'red water' in Czech. Its name derives from limonite contained in the local stream basin, which sometimes coloured it to brown or red. According to local legend, it was named after the bloodshed during the Hussite Wars, when the stream was coloured with blood.

== Geography ==
Červená Voda is located about 18 kilometres (11 mi) northwest of Šumperk and 25 km (16 mi) east of Ústí nad Orlicí. The municipality lies on the historic border between Moravia and Bohemia. The villages of Dolní Orlice and Horní Orlice are located in Bohemia, while the rest of the municipal territory lies in Moravia.

Červená Voda is a long village, stretching along the banks of the stream Červenovodský potok, which contributes the Březná River. The village is situated in the Kłodzko Valley between the mountain ranges of the Orlické Mountains and the Hanušovice Highlands, in which the municipal territory also significantly extends. The municipality is located on the European water divide between three seas: the Baltic Sea, the North Sea and the Black Sea. The Tichá Orlice River originates in Horní Orlice.

== History ==
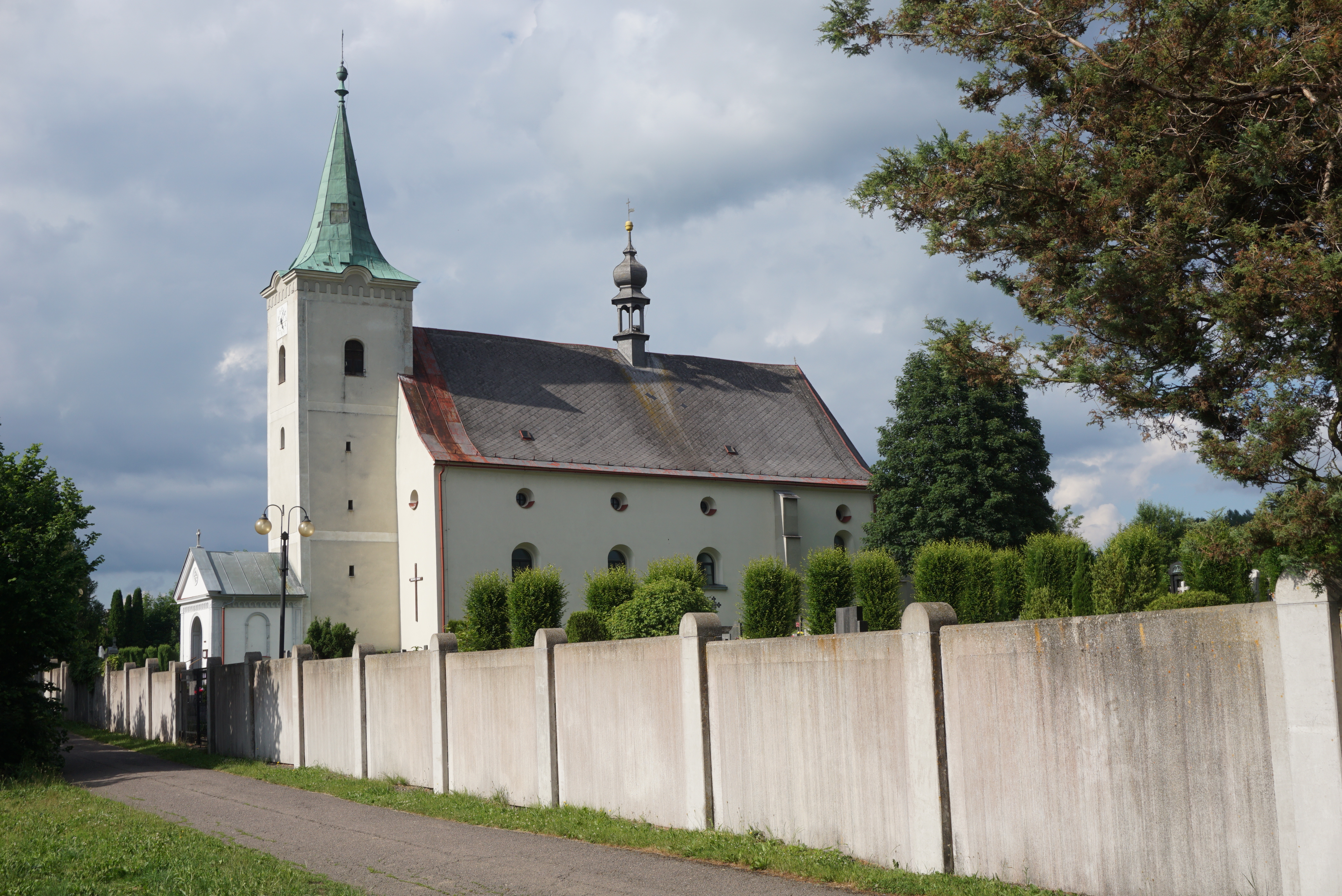
Church of Saint Matthias

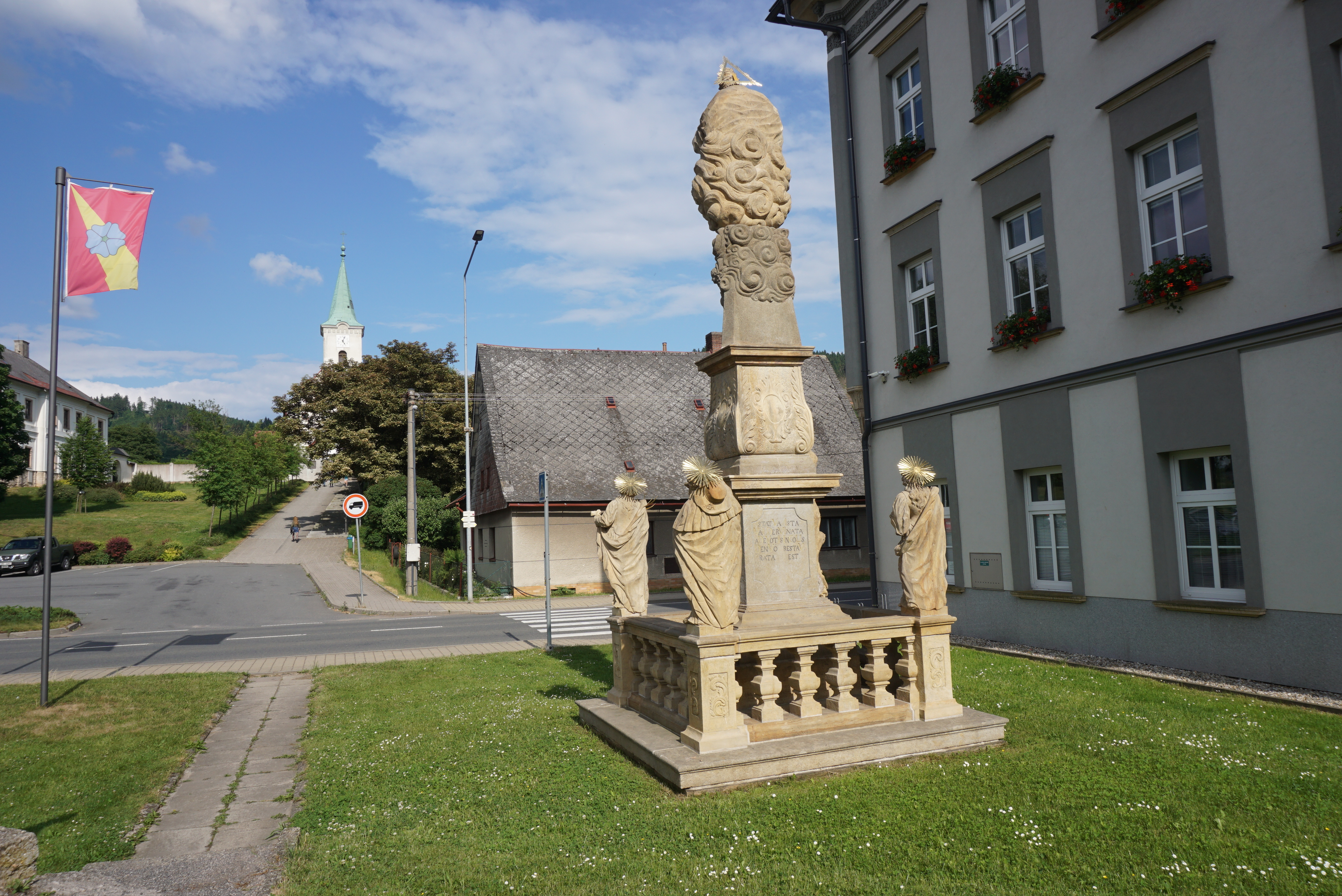
Sculptural group of the Holy Trinity

The first written mention of Červená Voda is from 1481, under its original name Malé Heroltice. The area of today's Červená Voda belonged to estates of Šilperk (later Štíty), Ruda nad Moravou and Králíky. Šanov was first mentioned in 1556. In 1562, Georg Schürer founded here the first glassworks.

As part of the Štíty estate, Červená Voda was owned by Pavel Kathar of Kathar, who sold it to the Odkolek of Újezdec family in 1602. The first written mention of Bílá Voda is from 1596, when it was together with Mlýnice as parts of the Ruda nad Moravou estate acquired by the Zierotin family. During the rule of Zierotins, the estate experienced boom and its price has risen markedly. After the Battle of White Mountain, Ladislav Velen lost all his manors.

Consequently, Karl Eusebius gained power over the Štíty estate in 1624 and united it with the estate of Ruda nad Moravou. The prosperity of estates ended with Thirty Years' War. Červená Voda was damaged and looted several times.

In 1847, the village gained the right to hold markets, but never had the status of a market town.

In implication of the Revolution of 1848 came the fall of the patrimonial regime. The land reform of 1850 made Červená Voda part of the political district of Hohenstadt. Did most of the villagers made a living from agriculture till than, the second part of the 19th century was molded by the commencing industrialisation, foremost by textile fabrication in 1850. In 1865, Červená Voda was connected to the state's road network. By 1866, Prussian troops once more passed through the village without causing greater damages.

With the opening of a branch line from Králíky to Štíty, Červená Voda was connected to the railway network in 1899 and concurrently experienced its economical and social heyday. After World War I, Moravia and thus Červená Voda became part of the newly formed First Czechoslovak Republic.

=== Modern history ===
After the Munich Agreement in 1938, Červená Voda was occupied by Nazi Germany and administared as part of the Reichsgau Sudetenland. Thus Czechoslovakia had lost all its heavily fortified borderlands, leaving it indefensible. The Czech population left Červená Voda and went inland.

In 1944, Germany opened here a sub-camp of the Gross-Rosen concentration camp. About 650 Jewish women from Hungary, Poland, France and Romania was sent there from Auschwitz concentration camp.

After the war, the German-speaking population was expelled per the Beneš decrees in 1946. The village was partly resettled by Czech people from surrounding villages.

In 1949, Šanov and Červená Voda municipalities were merged. By the administrative reform in 1960, Červená Voda was greatly enlarged by affiliating the surrounding villages. In 1973, Horní Boříkovice separated and joined Králíky.

== Demographics ==
Historical population

Year	Pop.	±%
1869	7,852	—
1880	7,540	−4.0%
1890	7,599	+0.8%
1900	6,742	−11.3%
1910	6,418	−4.8%

Year	Pop.	±%
1921	5,377	−16.2%
1930	5,663	+5.3%
1950	2,908	−48.6%
1961	3,164	+8.8%
1970	3,094	−2.2%

Year	Pop.	±%
1980	3,056	−1.2%
1991	3,067	+0.4%
2001	3,227	+5.2%
2011	3,078	−4.6%
2021	2,869	−6.8%

Source: Censuses

== Transport ==
The I/11 road from Hradec Králové to Šumperk runs through the municipality. The I/43 road heading to Králíky and the Czech–Polish border separates from it in Červená Voda.

The railway leads across the municipality. There are six stations and stops: Moravský Karlov, Červená Voda, Červená Voda-Pod rozhlednou, Dolní Orlice, Bílá Voda and Mlýnický Dvůr. Two lines are served, from Ústí nad Orlicí to Moravský Karlov and from Dolní Lipka to Moravský Karlov.

== Sport ==
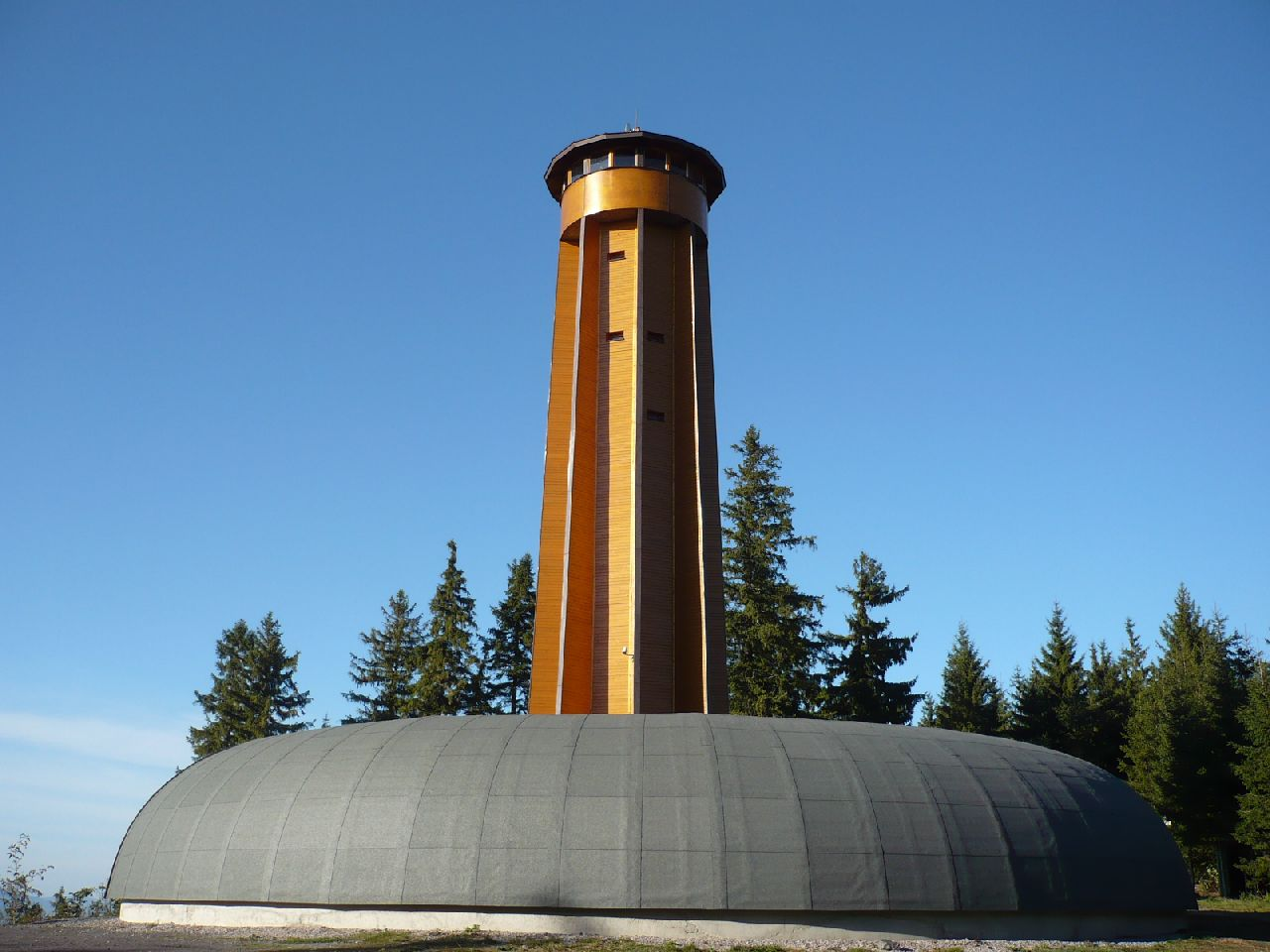
Observation tower on Křížová hora

There is a small ski resort in Mlýnický Dvůr part of Červená Voda.

== Sights ==
The most notable building in Červená Voda is the Church of Saint Matthias. It was built in 1686. There is also the Church of the Nativity of the Virgin Mary in Mlýnický Dvůr from 1575, and the Church of Saint Joseph Calasanz in Moravský Karlov from 1792.

In 2006, an observation tower was inaugurated on Křížová hora Mountain.

== Notable people ==
- Manfred Buder (1936–2021), German ice hockey player
