= Králíky =

- Town
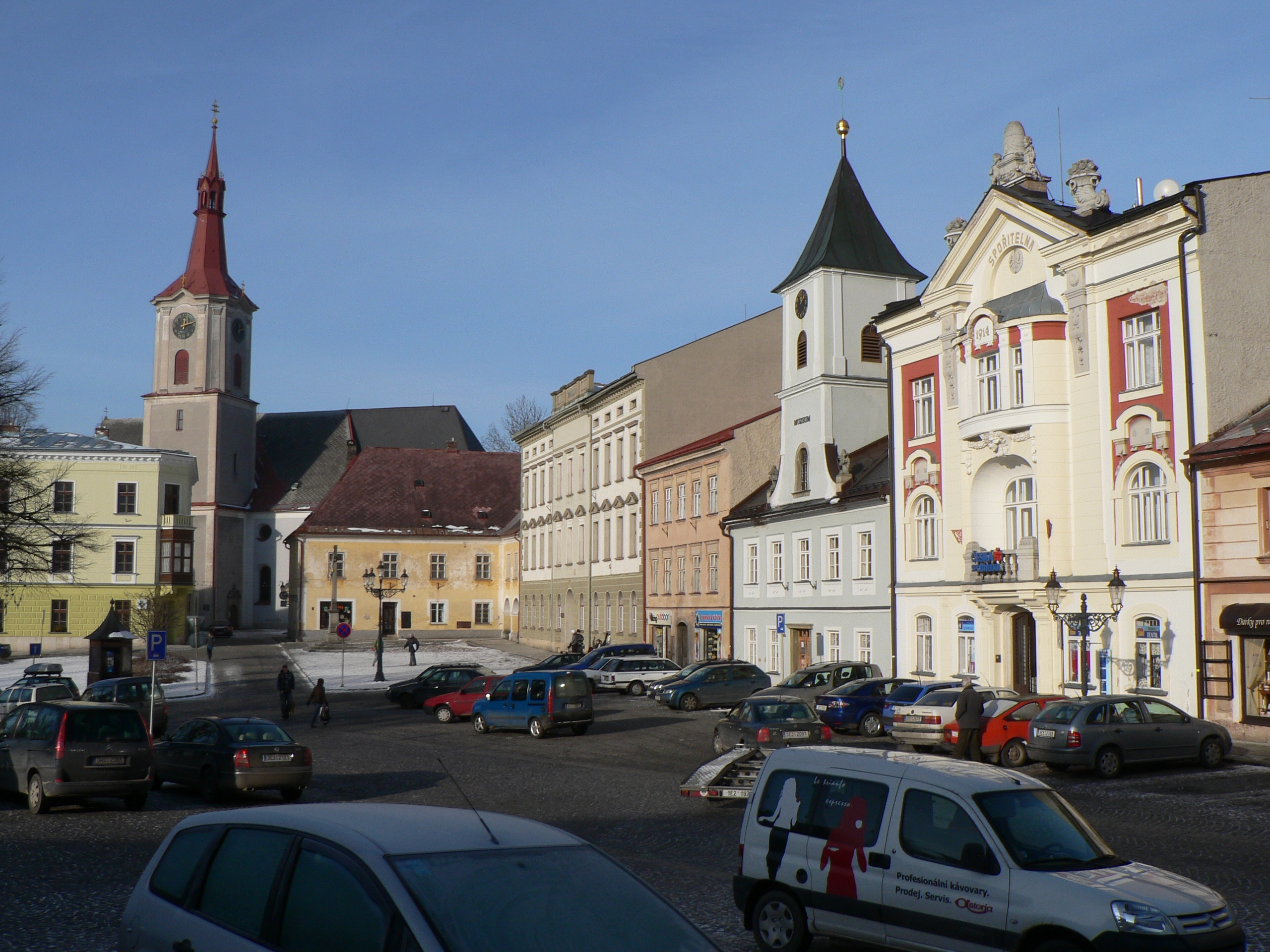
- Town square

- Flag Coat of arms

- Location in the Czech Republic
- Coordinates: 50°5′2″N 16°45′38″E
- Country: Czech Republic
- Region: Pardubice
- District: Ústí nad Orlicí
- First mentioned: 1568

Government
  - Mayor: Václav Kubín

Area
  - Total: 52.78 km^{2} (20.38 sq mi)
- Elevation: 550 m (1,800 ft)

Population (2026-01-01)
  - Total: 4,042
  - Density: 76.58/km^{2} (198.3/sq mi)
- Time zone: UTC+1 (CET)
  - Summer (DST): UTC+2 (CEST)
- Postal code: 561 69
- Website: www.kraliky.eu

Králíky (Czech pronunciation: [ˈkraːliːkɪ]; German: Grulich) is a town in Ústí nad Orlicí District in the Pardubice Region of the Czech Republic. It has about 4,000 inhabitants. The town is located near the Tichá Orlice River, near the border with Poland.

Králíky was founded in the 16th century. The historic town centre is well preserved and is protected as an urban monument zone. The most important monument is the pilgrimage site Hora Matky Boží with the Church of the Assumption of the Virgin Mary, which is protected as a national cultural monument.

== Administrative division ==
Králíky consists of 11 municipal parts (in brackets population according to the 2021 census):

- Králíky (3,128)
- Červený Potok (76)
- Dolní Boříkovice (189)
- Dolní Hedeč (71)
- Dolní Lipka (105)
- Heřmanice (69)
- Horní Boříkovice (3)
- Horní Hedeč (7)
- Horní Lipka (83)
- Kopeček (2)
- Prostřední Lipka (143)

== Etymology ==
The similarity of the town's name with the modern Czech word králík (i.e. 'rabbit') is accidental. The oldest German name of the locality was derived from the personal German name Greulich, dialectally pronounced as Kralych. The Czech name was derived from this form.

== Geography ==
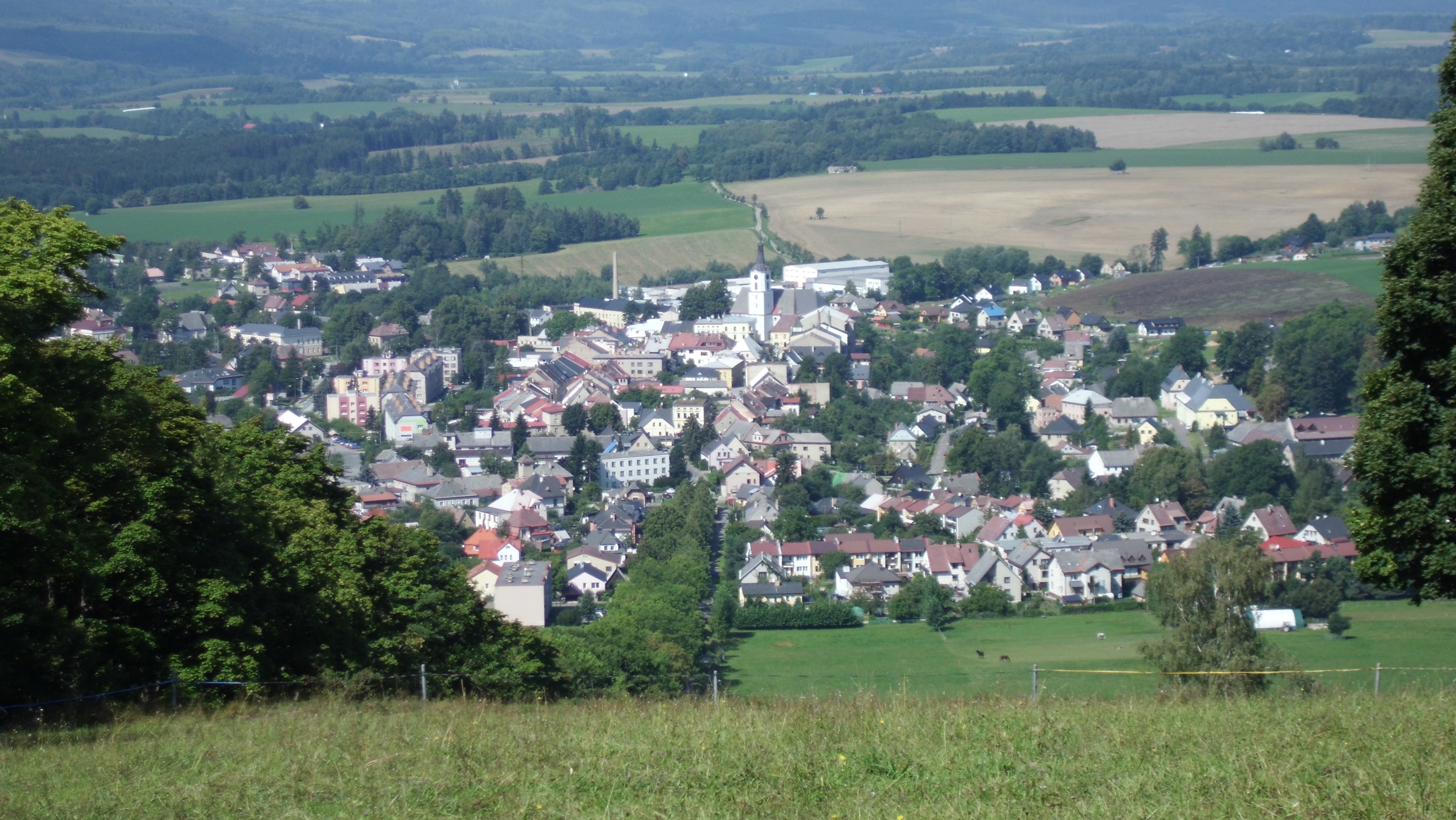
View from the southeast

Králíky is located about 28 kilometres (17 mi) northeast of Ústí nad Orlicí and 70 km (43 mi) east of Pardubice, on the border with Poland. The Tichá Orlice River flows through the western part of the municipal territory. The fishpond Králický rybník is located south of the town.

Králíky lies on the border between the Hanušovice Highlands and Kłodzko Valley. The northernmost tip of the municipal territory lies in the Králický Sněžník Mountains. The highest point is the mountain Jelení vrch at 936 m (3,071 ft) above sea level.

== History ==
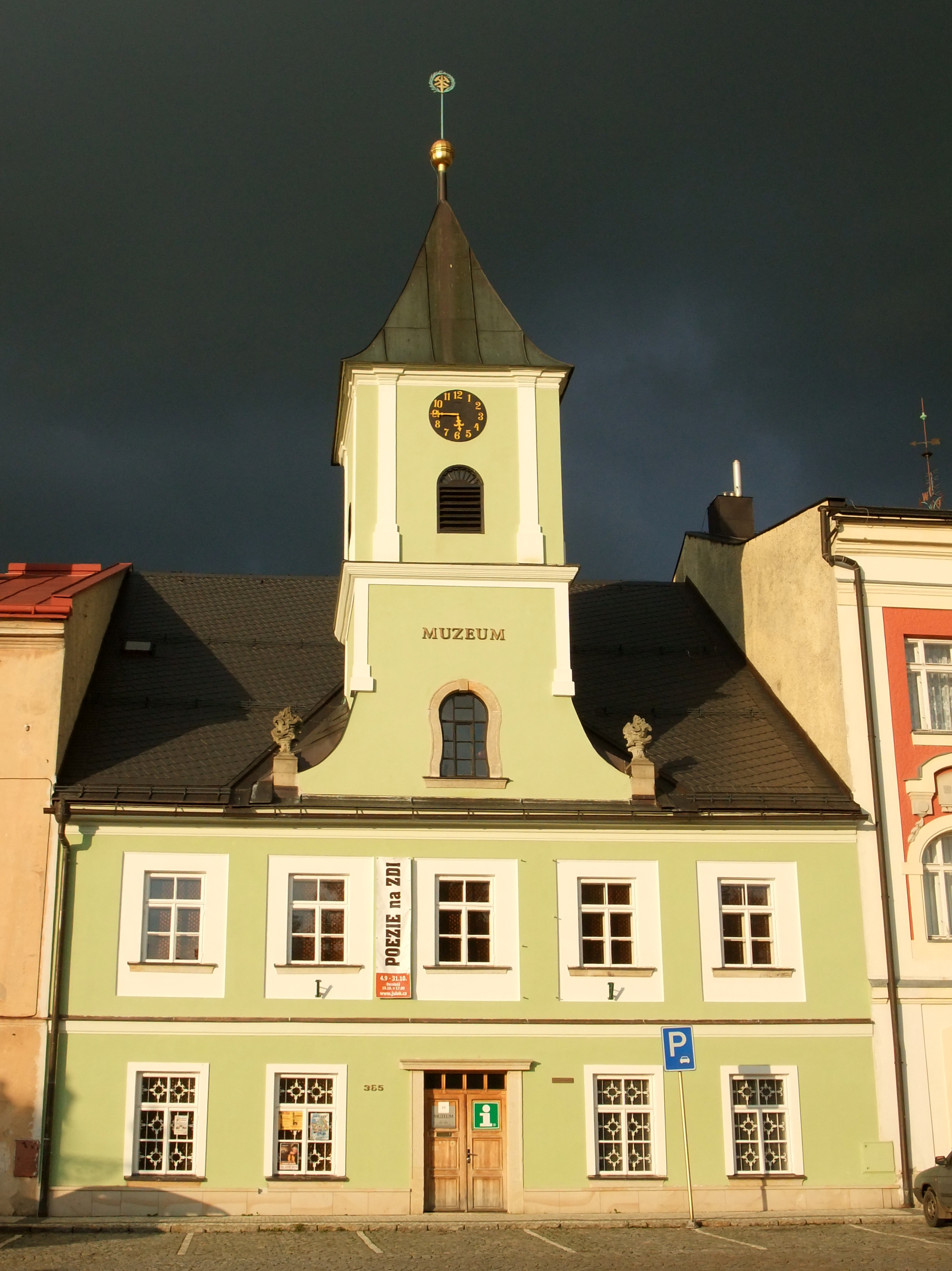
Old Baroque town hall

=== 14th–17th centuries ===
The first trustworthy written mention of the area of today's town is from 1367. It is a record preserved in the country's tables of law, by which King Charles IV presented the castle of Žampach and the mountains belonging to it to Čeněk of Potštejn. However, this record concerns only some unspecified mines.

The town was founded as late as in the 16th century and the first written mention is from 1568. In 1577, the town and ten neighbouring villages were bought by the Waldstein family. Zdeněk of Waldstein chose the town of Králíky as the residence of his new estate and began to develop it. Except the manor house, vicarage and Protestant oratory (today's Church of Saint Michael the Archangel), he had the square built into today's shape and at his request, Emperor Rudolf II granted the town a privilege to hold three annual fairs. In the surroundings, iron ore was probably mined and perhaps silver, and at that time the town was supposed to get two crossed mining hammers with a sword into its heraldry. There was an attempt to revive mining in the 17th century, but it is believed to have been unsuccessful. The industry has never been restarted.

=== 18th–20th centuries ===
Near the curative springs above the town, Bishop Tobias Johannes Becker, a local native, had a monumental pilgrimage complex built in 1696–1710. A lot of visitors came to this pilgrimage place and poor inhabitants of the Králíky region made a living from these pilgrimages. Production and sale of souvenirs boomed. Wood carving began to develop, and Christmas cribs and wooden characters that have found their way all over the world are reminders of this. Organ building and weaving also developed. Many cathedrals and churches all over Bohemia feature organs from the organ masters of Králíky, one of the greatest being in Prague's Loreta. Weaving played an important role in the originating of a textile tradition, and Králíky canvas was successfully sold all over the country.

In the 18th century, the town suffered from fires, plague and wars. Though no major battles took place in the region, the town suffered from the crossings of armies. Fights, plunderings and bribery took place here, as well as in other parts of the country. During the biggest fires in 1708 and 1767, a major part of the town burned down, including the most important buildings. The original wooden houses were replaced by stone ones. After Kłodzko Land was surrendered to Prussia, many of its inhabitants moved to Králíky and the town began to grow. In 1899, the railway was built.

From 1938 to 1945, it was occupied by Nazi Germany and administered as part of the Reichsgau Sudetenland. In 1944–1945, the Germans operated a subcamp of the Gross-Rosen concentration camp, whose prisoners were mostly Poles and Russians. The German speaking population was expelled in 1945 in accordance with the Potsdam Agreement and replaced by Czechs.

== Demographics ==
Historical population

Year	Pop.	±%
1869	7,840	—
1880	7,780	−0.8%
1890	7,670	−1.4%
1900	7,829	+2.1%
1910	7,863	+0.4%

Year	Pop.	±%
1921	6,865	−12.7%
1930	7,201	+4.9%
1950	4,261	−40.8%
1961	4,457	+4.6%
1970	4,814	+8.0%

Year	Pop.	±%
1980	5,067	+5.3%
1991	4,890	−3.5%
2001	4,826	−1.3%
2011	4,327	−10.3%
2021	3,876	−10.4%

Source: Censuses

== Transport ==
The I/43 road from Brno and Svitavy to the Czech–Polish border runs through the town. On the Czech–Polish border is the road border crossing Dolní Lipka / Boboszów.

Králíky is located on the railway line Ústí nad Orlicí–Moravský Karlov.

== Sights ==
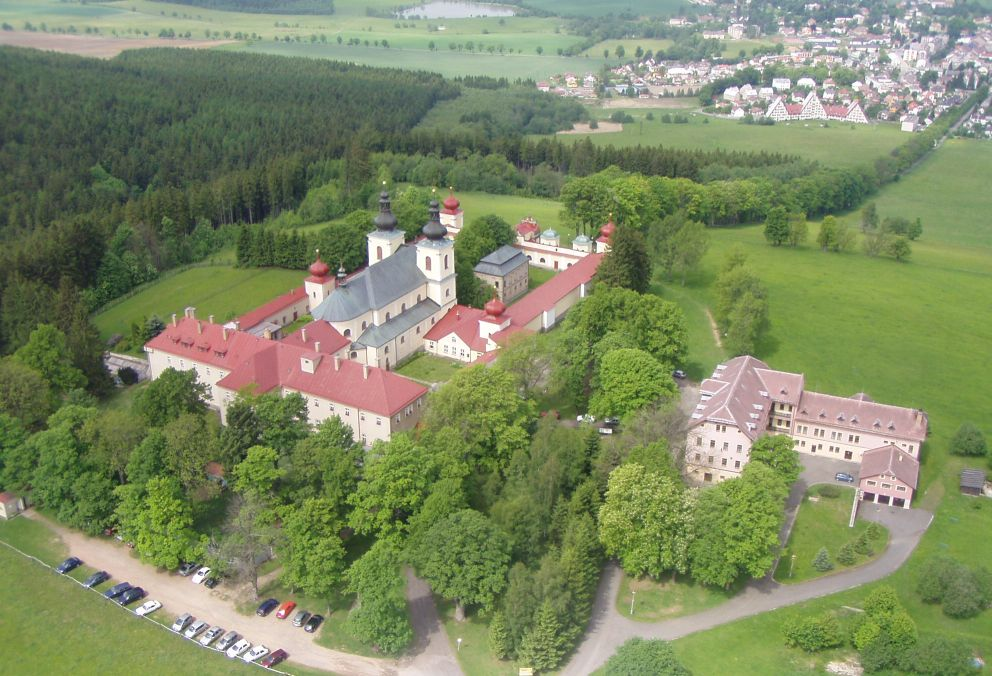
The pilgrimage complex

The Hora Matky Boží Monastery pilgrimage complex is formed by the monastery, the Church of the Assumption of the Virgin Mary and the Memorial to the Victims of Internment in 1948–1961. The monastery includes Chapel of the Holy Stairs with cloisters, a crypt, and a pilgrimage house. The way from the town to the complex is lined with the Stations of the Cross. The pilgrimage complex with the church is protected as a national cultural monument.

The historic centre of Králíky contains preserved burgher houses and the Church of Saint Michael the Archangel. The church was originally a late Renaissance Protestant oratory from around 1577, which was damaged by fires and rebuilt in the Baroque style in the 17th and 18th centuries.

The area of Králíky and Prostřední Lipka is known for the Military Museum. Many remains of the Czechoslovak fortification system from the period 1935–1938 are open to the public, including Hůrka artillery fortress and U Cihelny infantry cabin.

== Notable people ==
- Hans Neuburg (1904–1983), graphic designer

== Twin towns – sister cities ==
Králíky is twinned with:

- Międzylesie, Poland
- Solbiate Olona, Italy
- Villmar, Germany
