= Mezilesí (Pelhřimov District) =

- Municipality
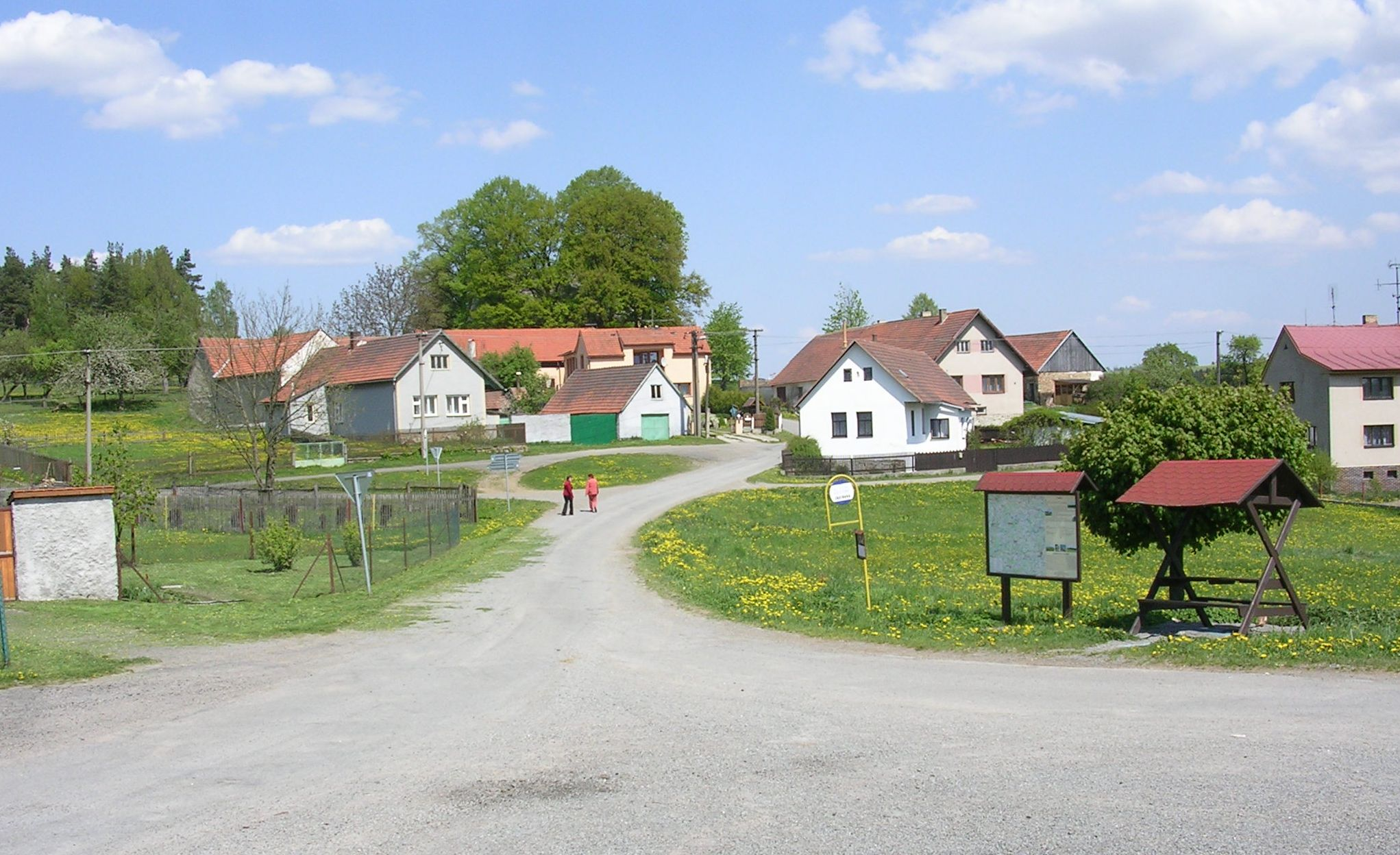
- Centre of Mezilesí

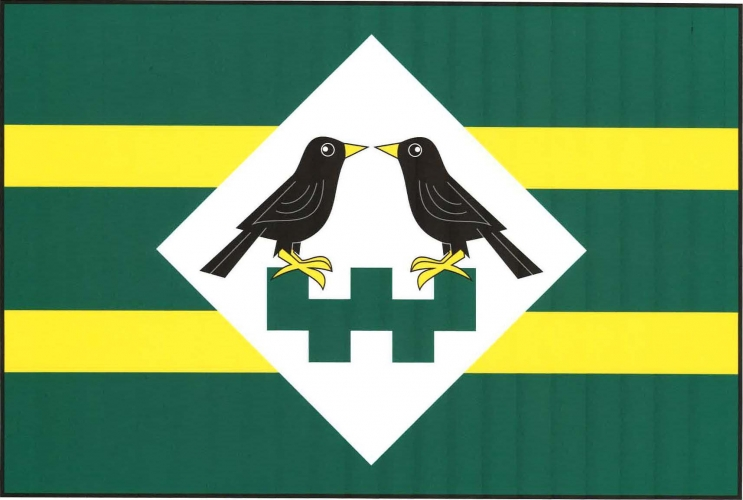
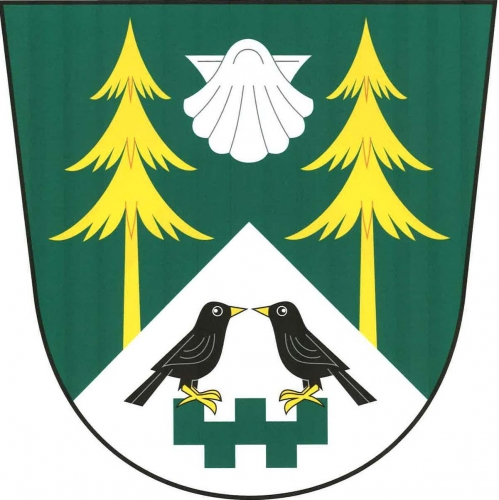
- Flag Coat of arms

- Location in the Czech Republic
- Coordinates: 49°32′28″N 14°56′57″E
- Country: Czech Republic
- Region: Vysočina
- District: Pelhřimov
- First mentioned: 1352

Area
  - Total: 6.99 km^{2} (2.70 sq mi)
- Elevation: 598 m (1,962 ft)

Population (2026-01-01)
  - Total: 103
  - Density: 14.7/km^{2} (38.2/sq mi)
- Time zone: UTC+1 (CET)
  - Summer (DST): UTC+2 (CEST)
- Postal code: 395 01
- Website: www.obecmezilesi.cz

Mezilesí is a municipality and village in Pelhřimov District in the Vysočina Region of the Czech Republic. It has about 100 inhabitants.

Mezilesí lies approximately 24 kilometres (15 mi) north-west of Pelhřimov, 50 km (31 mi) west of Jihlava, and 72 km (45 mi) south-east of Prague.

== Administrative division ==
Mezilesí consists of three municipal parts (in brackets population according to the 2021 census):

- Mezilesí (47)
- Holýšov (25)
- Zelená Ves (42)

== Demographics ==
Historical population
Year	Pop.	±%
1869	660	—
1880	625	−5.3%
1890	612	−2.1%
1900	626	+2.3%
1910	559	−10.7%
1921	565	+1.1%
1930	496	−12.2%
1950	320	−35.5%
1961	305	−4.7%
1970	286	−6.2%
1980	229	−19.9%
1991	156	−31.9%
2001	131	−16.0%
2011	127	−3.1%
2021	114	−10.2%
Source: Censuses
