= Drozdov (Šumperk District) =

- Municipality
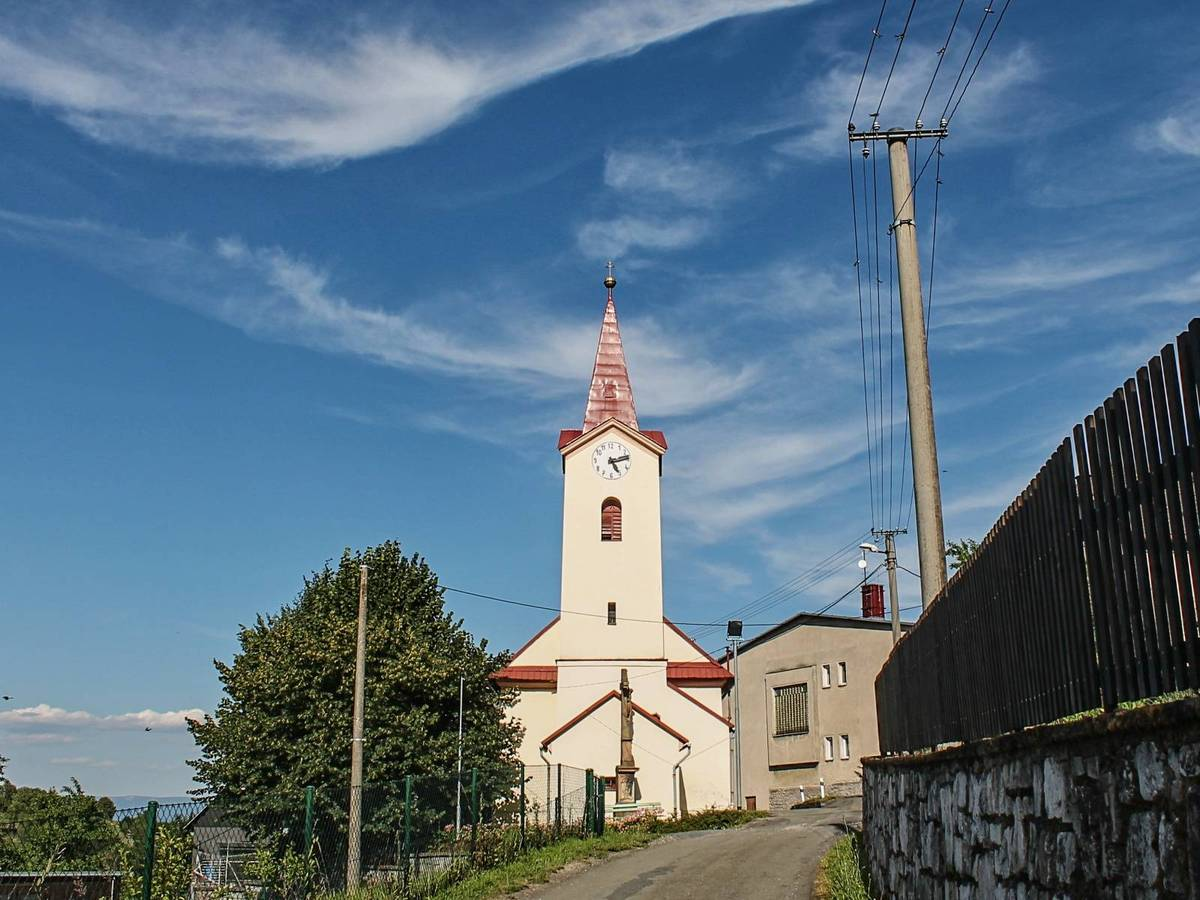
- Chapel of Saints Fabian and Sebastian

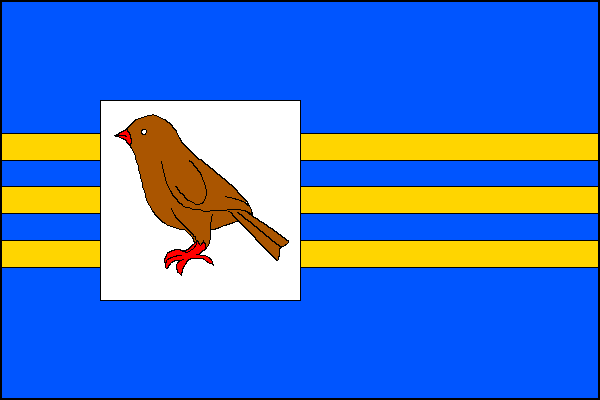
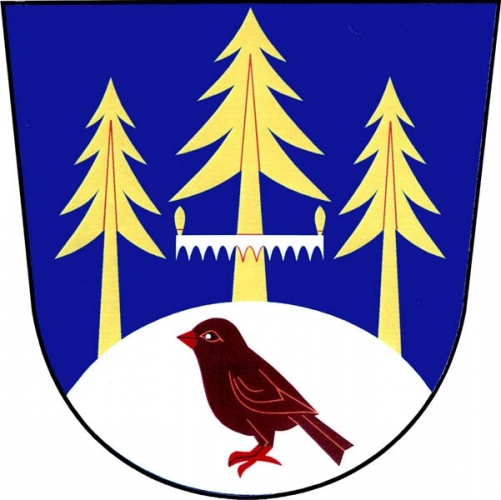
- Flag Coat of arms

- Location in the Czech Republic
- Coordinates: 49°54′28″N 16°47′15″E
- Country: Czech Republic
- Region: Olomouc
- District: Šumperk
- First mentioned: 1417

Area
  - Total: 13.69 km^{2} (5.29 sq mi)
- Elevation: 515 m (1,690 ft)

Population (2026-01-01)
  - Total: 360
  - Density: 26/km^{2} (68/sq mi)
- Time zone: UTC+1 (CET)
  - Summer (DST): UTC+2 (CEST)
- Postal codes: 789 01
- Website: drozdov.zabrezsko.cz

Drozdov (German: Drosenau) is a municipality and village in Šumperk District in the Olomouc Region of the Czech Republic. It has about 400 inhabitants.

Drozdov lies approximately 16 kilometres (10 mi) south-west of Šumperk, 48 km (30 mi) north-west of Olomouc, and 171 km (106 mi) east of Prague.

== Demographics ==
Historical population
Year	Pop.	±%
1869	855	—
1880	811	−5.1%
1890	812	+0.1%
1900	802	−1.2%
1910	740	−7.7%
1921	690	−6.8%
1930	679	−1.6%
1950	424	−37.6%
1961	451	+6.4%
1970	358	−20.6%
1980	387	+8.1%
1991	364	−5.9%
2001	340	−6.6%
2011	324	−4.7%
2021	339	+4.6%
Source: Censuses
