= Sklené (Svitavy District) =

- Municipality
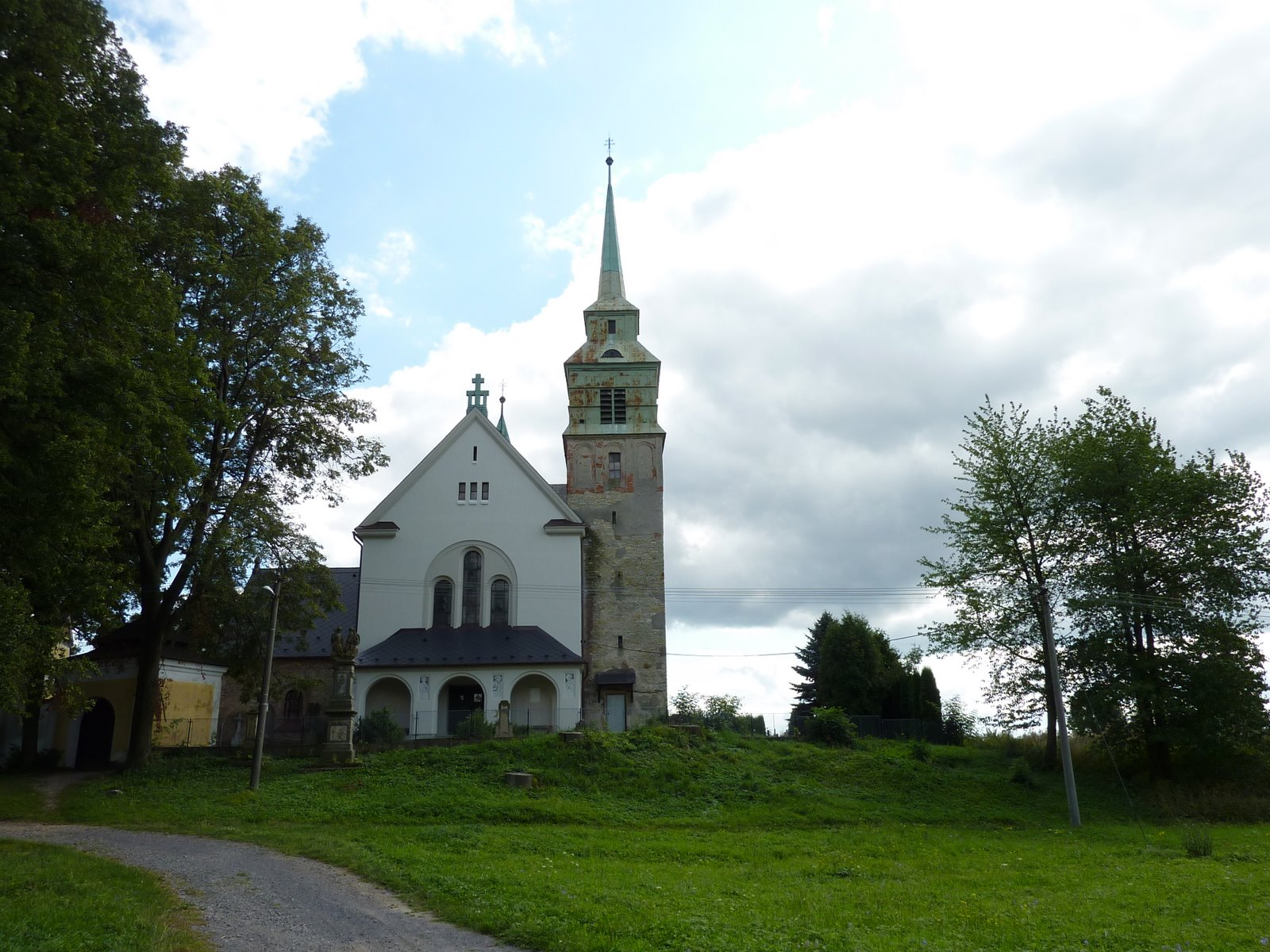
- Church of Saints Peter and Paul

- Flag Coat of arms

- Location in the Czech Republic
- Coordinates: 49°42′24″N 16°31′50″E
- Country: Czech Republic
- Region: Pardubice
- District: Svitavy
- First mentioned: 1320

Area
  - Total: 9.97 km^{2} (3.85 sq mi)
- Elevation: 510 m (1,670 ft)

Population (2026-01-01)
  - Total: 235
  - Density: 23.6/km^{2} (61.0/sq mi)
- Time zone: UTC+1 (CET)
  - Summer (DST): UTC+2 (CEST)
- Postal code: 568 02
- Website: www.obec-sklene.cz

Sklené is a municipality and village in Svitavy District in the Pardubice Region of the Czech Republic. It has about 200 inhabitants.

Sklené lies approximately 9 kilometres (6 mi) south-east of Svitavy, 67 km (42 mi) south-east of Pardubice, and 158 km (98 mi) east of Prague.

== Demographics ==
Historical population
Year	Pop.	±%
1869	493	—
1880	521	+5.7%
1890	479	−8.1%
1900	486	+1.5%
1910	489	+0.6%
1921	448	−8.4%
1930	439	−2.0%
1950	280	−36.2%
1961	271	−3.2%
1970	241	−11.1%
1980	258	+7.1%
1991	231	−10.5%
2001	214	−7.4%
2011	229	+7.0%
2021	211	−7.9%
Source: Censuses
