= Šanov (Rakovník District) =

- Municipality
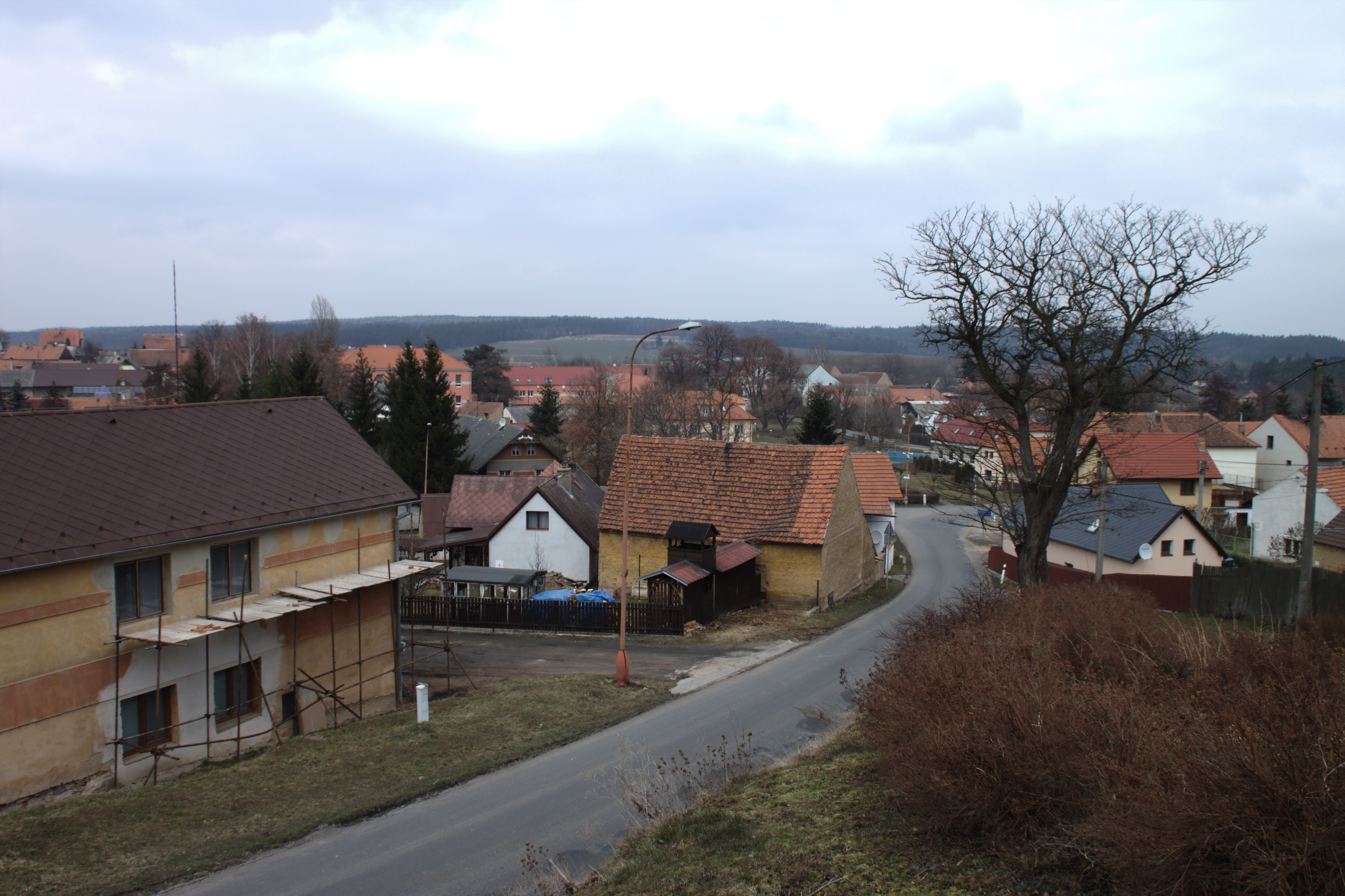
- View of Šanov from above

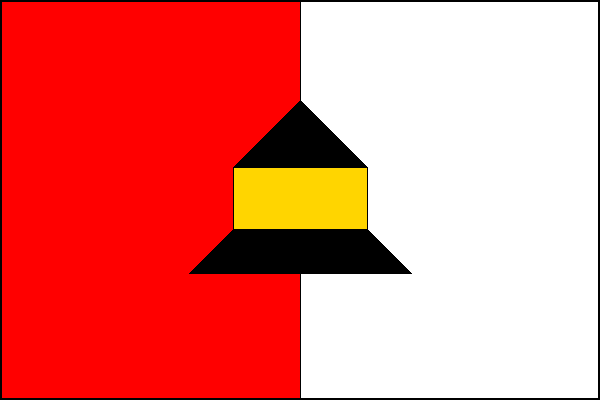
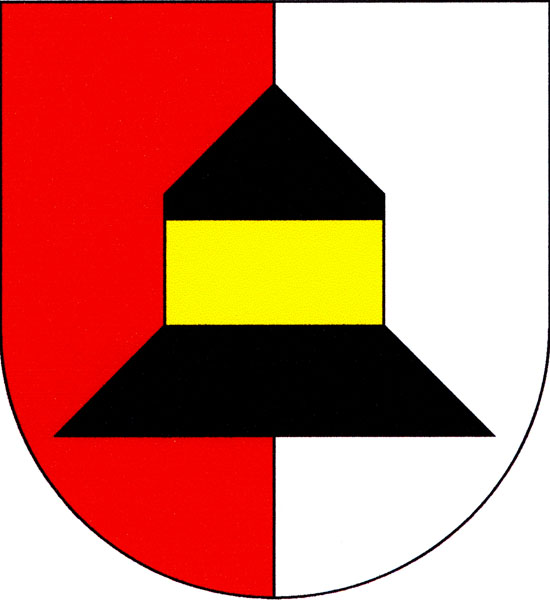
- Flag Coat of arms

- Location in the Czech Republic
- Coordinates: 50°5′16″N 13°37′53″E
- Country: Czech Republic
- Region: Central Bohemian
- District: Rakovník
- First mentioned: 1296

Area
  - Total: 7.63 km^{2} (2.95 sq mi)
- Elevation: 355 m (1,165 ft)

Population (2026-01-01)
  - Total: 566
  - Density: 74.2/km^{2} (192/sq mi)
- Time zone: UTC+1 (CET)
  - Summer (DST): UTC+2 (CEST)
- Postal code: 270 31
- Website: www.obec-sanov.cz

Šanov is a municipality and village in Rakovník District in the Central Bohemian Region of the Czech Republic. It has about 600 inhabitants.

== Demographics ==
Historical population
Year	Pop.	±%
1869	767	—
1880	831	+8.3%
1890	810	−2.5%
1900	878	+8.4%
1910	942	+7.3%
1921	891	−5.4%
1930	803	−9.9%
1950	594	−26.0%
1961	597	+0.5%
1970	543	−9.0%
1980	479	−11.8%
1991	409	−14.6%
2001	463	+13.2%
2011	519	+12.1%
2021	522	+0.6%
Source: Censuses
