= Tatenice =

- Municipality
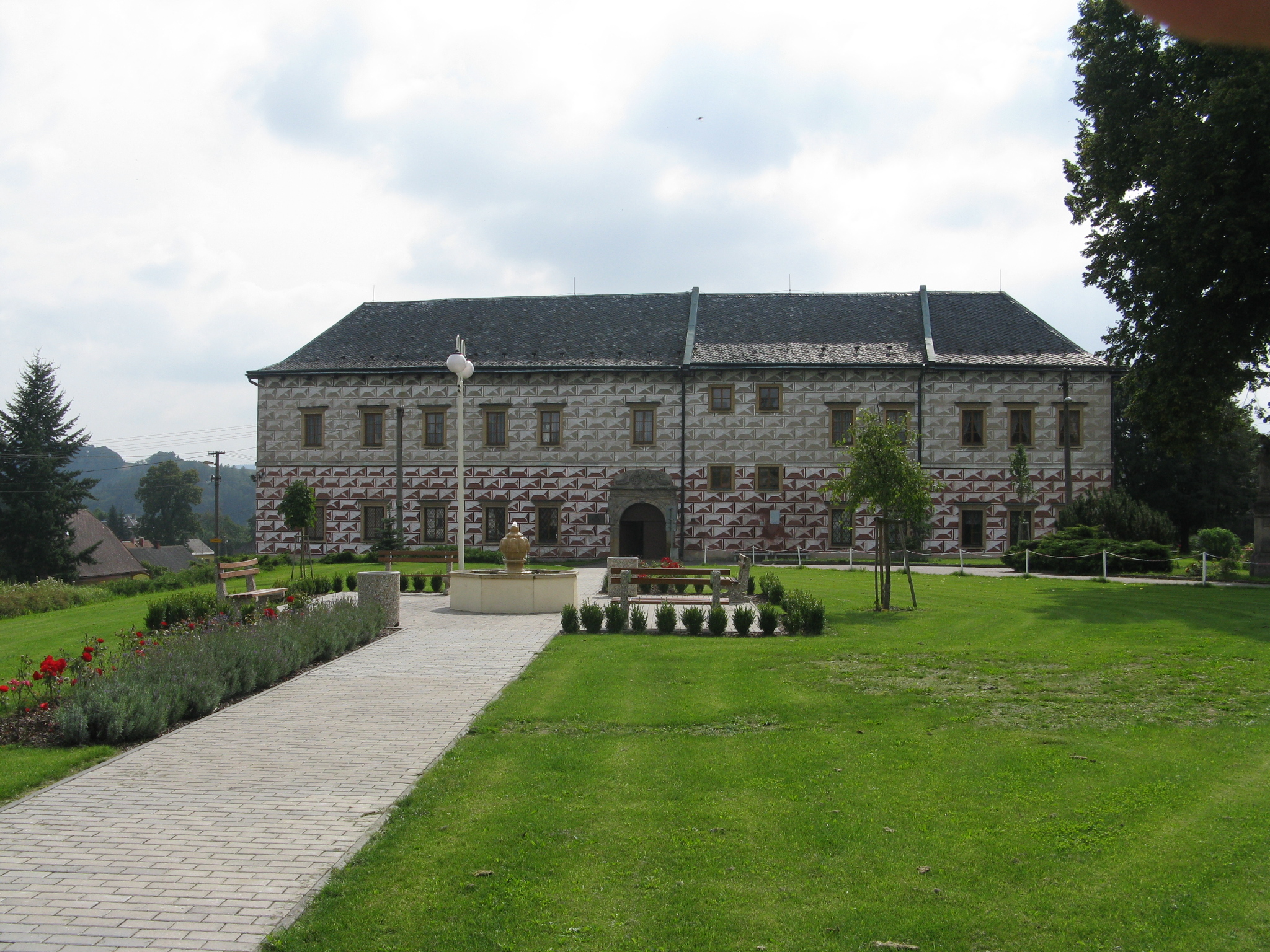
- Tatenice Castle

- Flag Coat of arms

- Location in the Czech Republic
- Coordinates: 49°52′16″N 16°41′50″E
- Country: Czech Republic
- Region: Pardubice
- District: Ústí nad Orlicí
- First mentioned: 1267

Area
  - Total: 26.82 km^{2} (10.36 sq mi)
- Elevation: 344 m (1,129 ft)

Population (2026-01-01)
  - Total: 906
  - Density: 33.8/km^{2} (87.5/sq mi)
- Time zone: UTC+1 (CET)
  - Summer (DST): UTC+2 (CEST)
- Postal code: 561 31
- Website: www.tatenice.cz

Tatenice (German: Tattenitz) is a municipality and village in Ústí nad Orlicí District in the Pardubice Region of the Czech Republic. It has about 900 inhabitants.

Tatenice lies approximately 25 kilometres (16 mi) south-east of Ústí nad Orlicí, 69 km (43 mi) east of Pardubice, and 165 km (103 mi) east of Prague.

== Demographics ==
Historical population
Year	Pop.	±%
1869	1,651	—
1880	1,610	−2.5%
1890	1,639	+1.8%
1900	1,582	−3.5%
1910	1,448	−8.5%
1921	1,400	−3.3%
1930	1,364	−2.6%
1950	806	−40.9%
1961	908	+12.7%
1970	875	−3.6%
1980	868	−0.8%
1991	819	−5.6%
2001	841	+2.7%
2011	839	−0.2%
2021	831	−1.0%
Source: Censuses
