= Hoštejn =

- Municipality
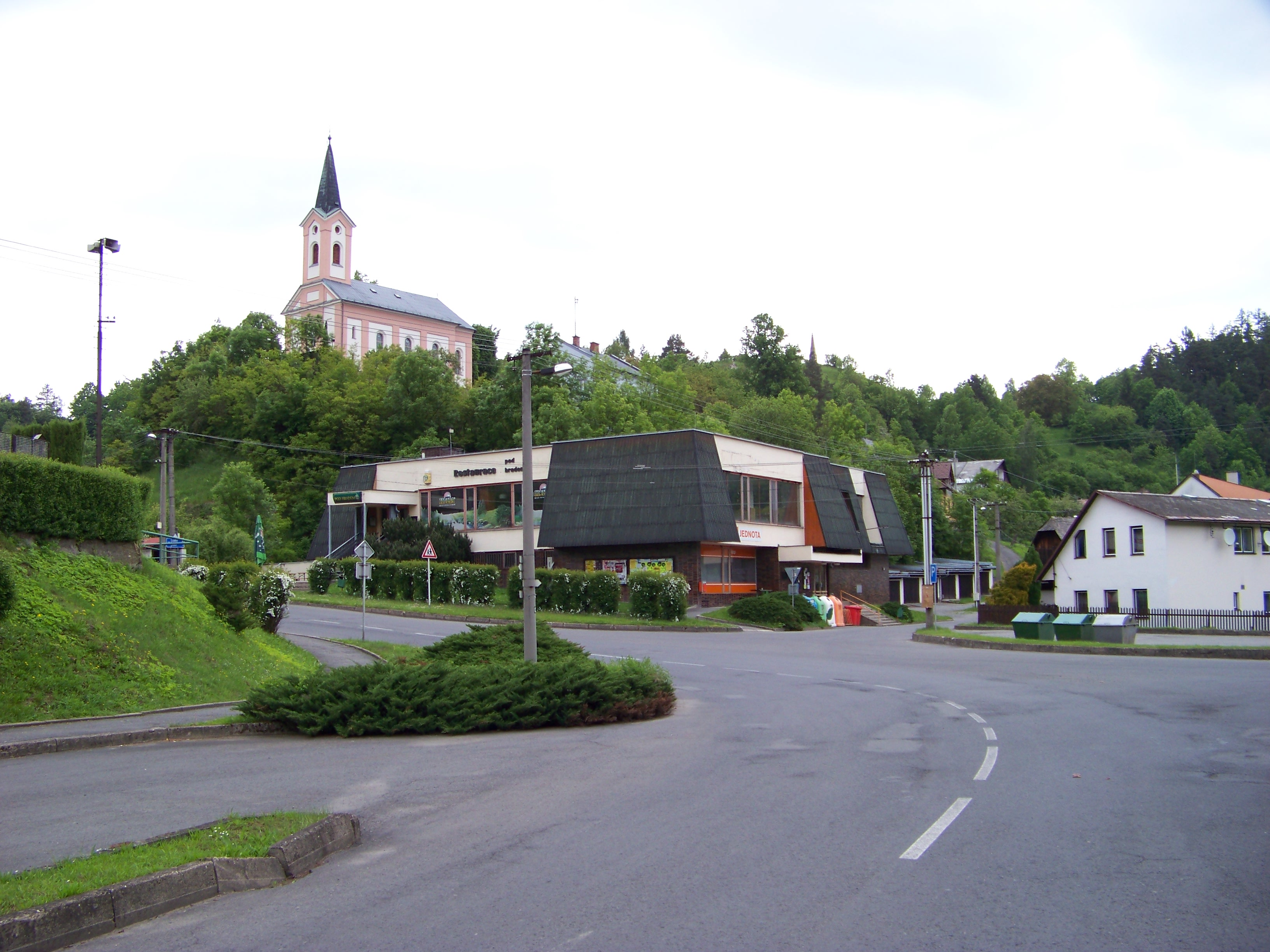
- Church of Saint Anne above the village

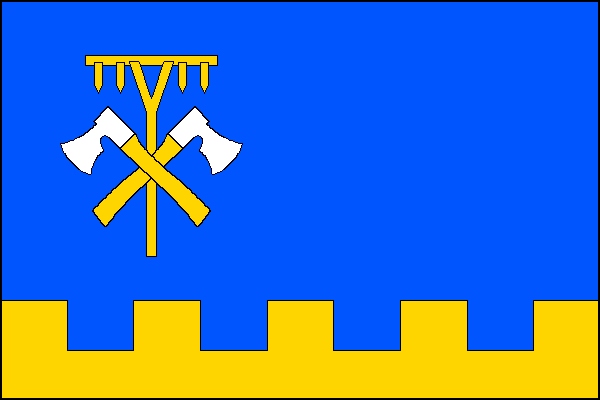
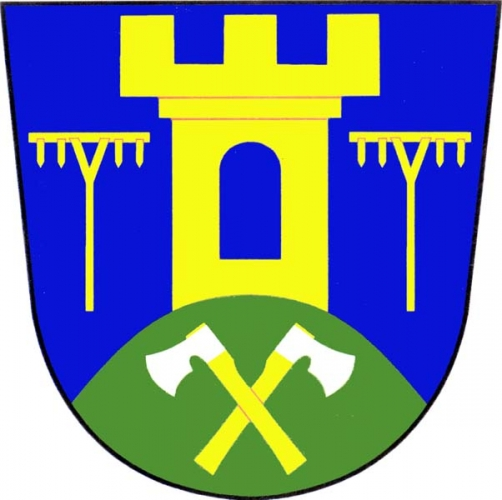
- Flag Coat of arms

- Location in the Czech Republic
- Coordinates: 49°52′28″N 16°46′29″E
- Country: Czech Republic
- Region: Olomouc
- District: Šumperk
- First mentioned: 1287

Area
  - Total: 1.83 km^{2} (0.71 sq mi)
- Elevation: 320 m (1,050 ft)

Population (2026-01-01)
  - Total: 433
  - Density: 237/km^{2} (613/sq mi)
- Time zone: UTC+1 (CET)
  - Summer (DST): UTC+2 (CEST)
- Postal codes: 789 01
- Website: hostejn.zabrezsko.cz

Hoštejn (German: Hochstein) is a municipality and village in Šumperk District in the Olomouc Region of the Czech Republic. It has about 400 inhabitants.

Hoštejn lies approximately 18 kilometres (11 mi) south-west of Šumperk, 47 km (29 mi) north-west of Olomouc, and 171 km (106 mi) east of Prague.

== Demographics ==
Historical population
Year	Pop.	±%
1869	323	—
1880	296	−8.4%
1890	302	+2.0%
1900	343	+13.6%
1910	336	−2.0%
1921	364	+8.3%
1930	423	+16.2%
1950	310	−26.7%
1961	347	+11.9%
1970	328	−5.5%
1980	376	+14.6%
1991	433	+15.2%
2001	450	+3.9%
2011	425	−5.6%
2021	413	−2.8%
Source: Censuses
