= Sklené nad Oslavou =

- Municipality
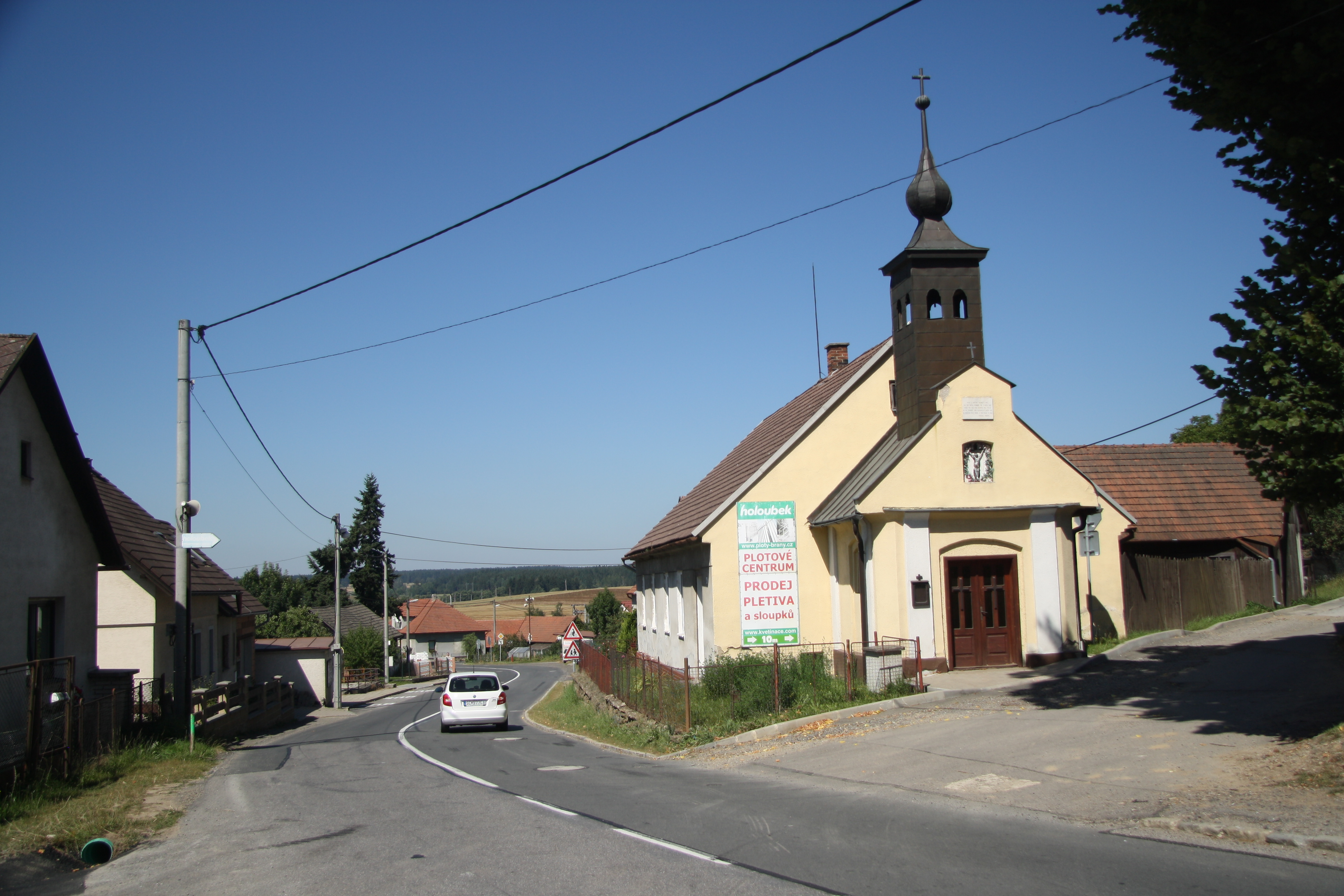
- Chapel of the Virgin Mary

- Flag Coat of arms

- Location in the Czech Republic
- Coordinates: 49°26′17″N 16°3′27″E
- Country: Czech Republic
- Region: Vysočina
- District: Žďár nad Sázavou
- First mentioned: 1368

Area
  - Total: 6.49 km^{2} (2.51 sq mi)
- Elevation: 573 m (1,880 ft)

Population (2026-01-01)
  - Total: 241
  - Density: 37.1/km^{2} (96.2/sq mi)
- Time zone: UTC+1 (CET)
  - Summer (DST): UTC+2 (CEST)
- Postal code: 591 01
- Website: www.sklenenadoslavou.cz

Sklené nad Oslavou is a municipality and village in Žďár nad Sázavou District in the Vysočina Region of the Czech Republic. It has about 200 inhabitants.

Sklené nad Oslavou lies approximately 16 kilometres (10 mi) south-east of Žďár nad Sázavou, 35 km (22 mi) east of Jihlava, and 138 km (86 mi) south-east of Prague.

== Demographics ==
Historical population
Year	Pop.	±%
1869	317	—
1880	311	−1.9%
1890	284	−8.7%
1900	302	+6.3%
1910	307	+1.7%
1921	323	+5.2%
1930	272	−15.8%
1950	256	−5.9%
1961	260	+1.6%
1970	237	−8.8%
1980	230	−3.0%
1991	247	+7.4%
2001	231	−6.5%
2011	225	−2.6%
2021	215	−4.4%
Source: Censuses
