= Sklené (Žďár nad Sázavou District) =

- Municipality
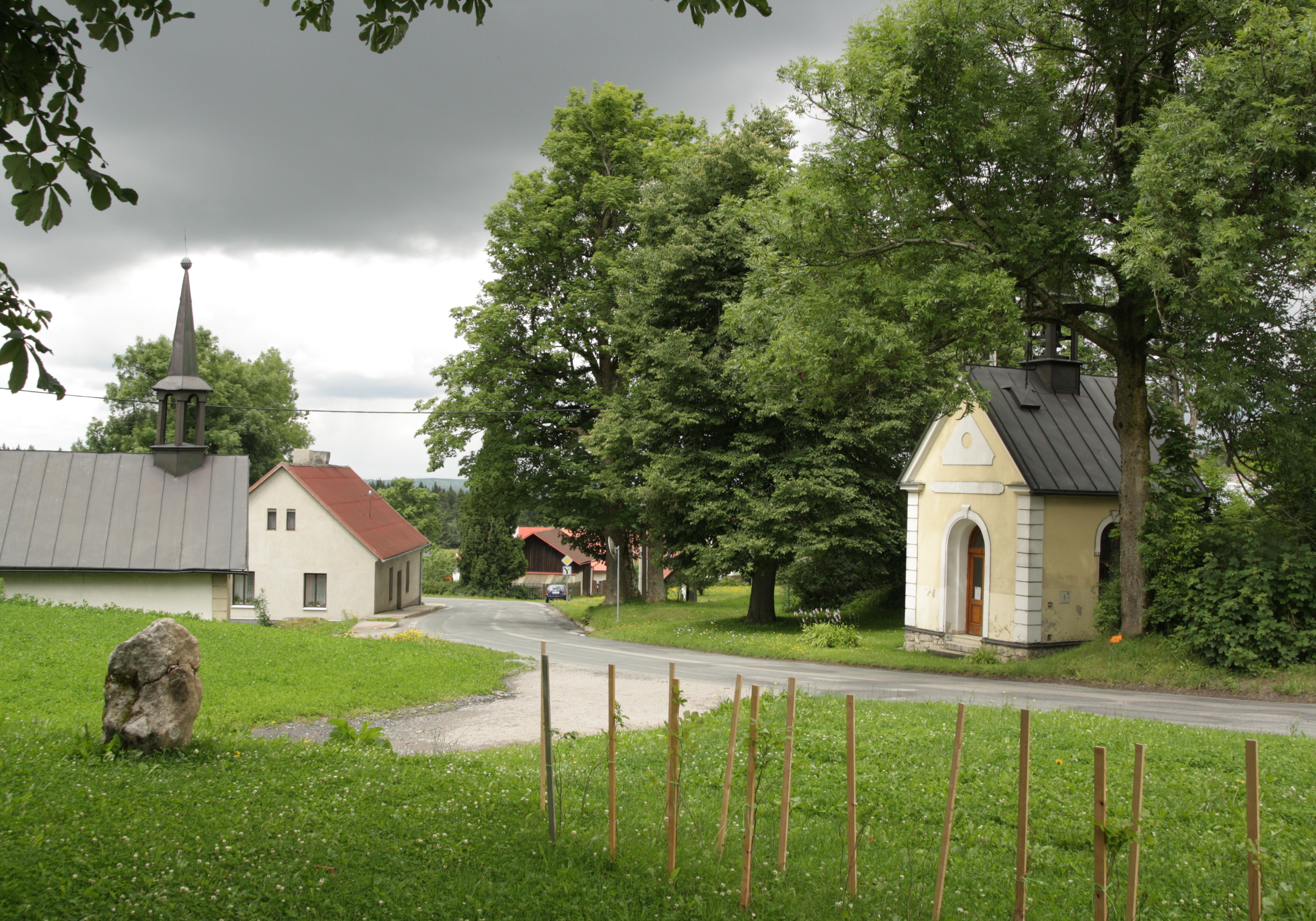
- Eastern part of Sklené

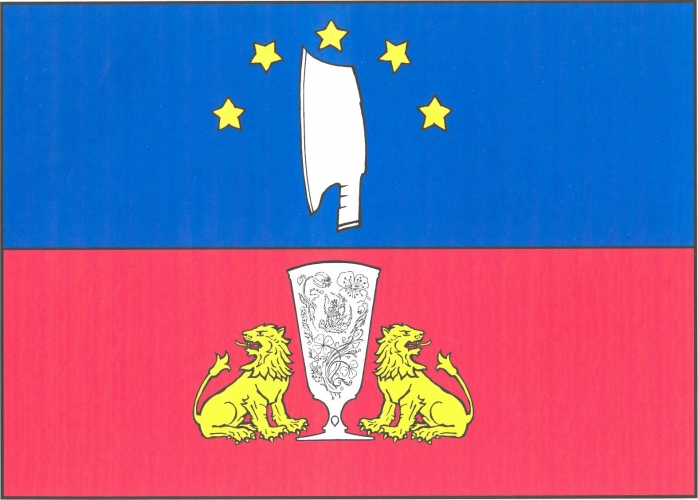
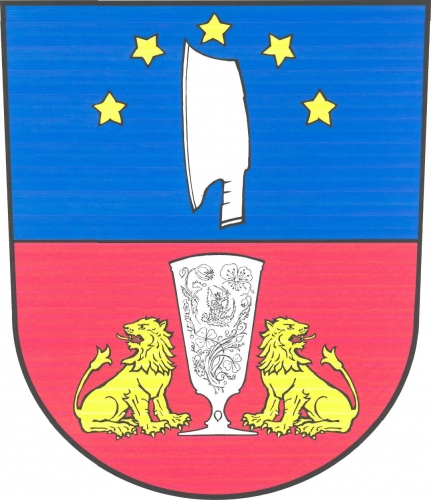
- Flag Coat of arms

- Location in the Czech Republic
- Coordinates: 49°36′34″N 16°0′25″E
- Country: Czech Republic
- Region: Vysočina
- District: Žďár nad Sázavou
- First mentioned: 1407

Area
  - Total: 8.45 km^{2} (3.26 sq mi)
- Elevation: 752 m (2,467 ft)

Population (2026-01-01)
  - Total: 100
  - Density: 12/km^{2} (31/sq mi)
- Time zone: UTC+1 (CET)
  - Summer (DST): UTC+2 (CEST)
- Postal code: 591 01
- Website: www.sklene.cz

Sklené is a municipality and village in Žďár nad Sázavou District in the Vysočina Region of the Czech Republic. It has about 100 inhabitants.

Sklené lies approximately 8 kilometres (5 mi) north-east of Žďár nad Sázavou, 39 km (24 mi) north-east of Jihlava, and 125 km (78 mi) south-east of Prague.

== Demographics ==
Historical population
Year	Pop.	±%
1869	510	—
1880	420	−17.6%
1890	376	−10.5%
1900	338	−10.1%
1910	326	−3.6%
1921	306	−6.1%
1930	251	−18.0%
1950	130	−48.2%
1961	132	+1.5%
1970	101	−23.5%
1980	72	−28.7%
1991	80	+11.1%
2001	95	+18.8%
2011	106	+11.6%
2021	99	−6.6%
Source: Censuses
