= Cotkytle =

- Municipality
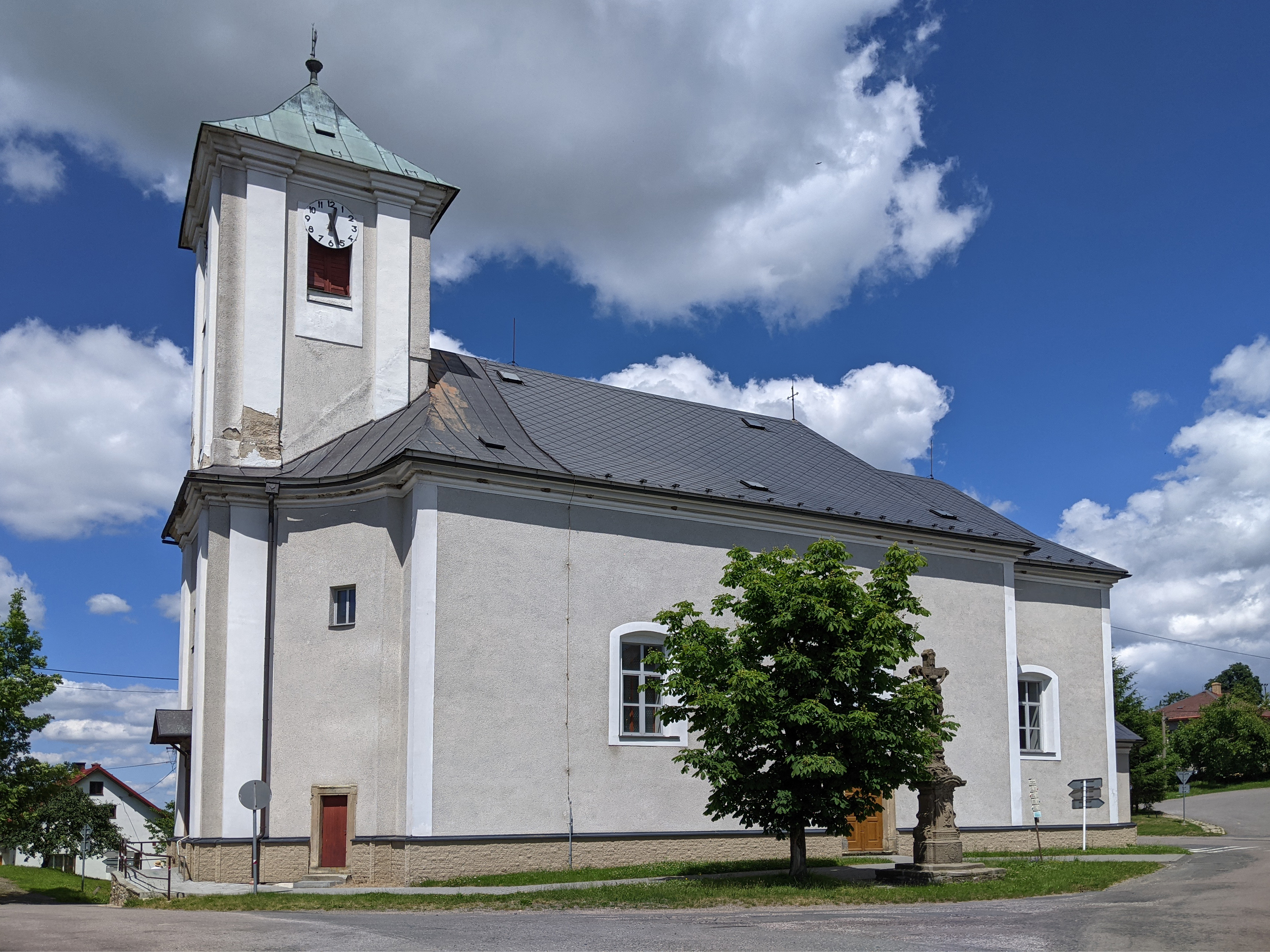
- Church of Saint John of Nepomuk

- Flag Coat of arms

- Location in the Czech Republic
- Coordinates: 49°56′10″N 16°43′27″E
- Country: Czech Republic
- Region: Pardubice
- District: Ústí nad Orlicí
- First mentioned: 1350

Area
  - Total: 18.64 km^{2} (7.20 sq mi)
- Elevation: 618 m (2,028 ft)

Population (2026-01-01)
  - Total: 385
  - Density: 20.7/km^{2} (53.5/sq mi)
- Time zone: UTC+1 (CET)
  - Summer (DST): UTC+2 (CEST)
- Postal code: 561 32
- Website: www.cotkytle.cz

Cotkytle (German: Zotküttl) is a municipality and village in Ústí nad Orlicí District in the Pardubice Region of the Czech Republic. It has about 400 inhabitants.

== Administrative division ==
Cotkytle consists of four municipal parts (in brackets population according to the 2021 census):

- Cotkytle (265)
- Herbortice (43)
- Janoušov (29)
- Mezilesí (26)

== Demographics ==
Historical population
Year	Pop.	±%
1869	2,245	—
1880	2,128	−5.2%
1890	1,927	−9.4%
1900	1,926	−0.1%
1910	1,842	−4.4%
1921	1,687	−8.4%
1930	1,600	−5.2%
1950	829	−48.2%
1961	784	−5.4%
1970	683	−12.9%
1980	618	−9.5%
1991	484	−21.7%
2001	426	−12.0%
2011	382	−10.3%
2021	363	−5.0%
Source: Censuses
