= Malá Morava =

- Municipality
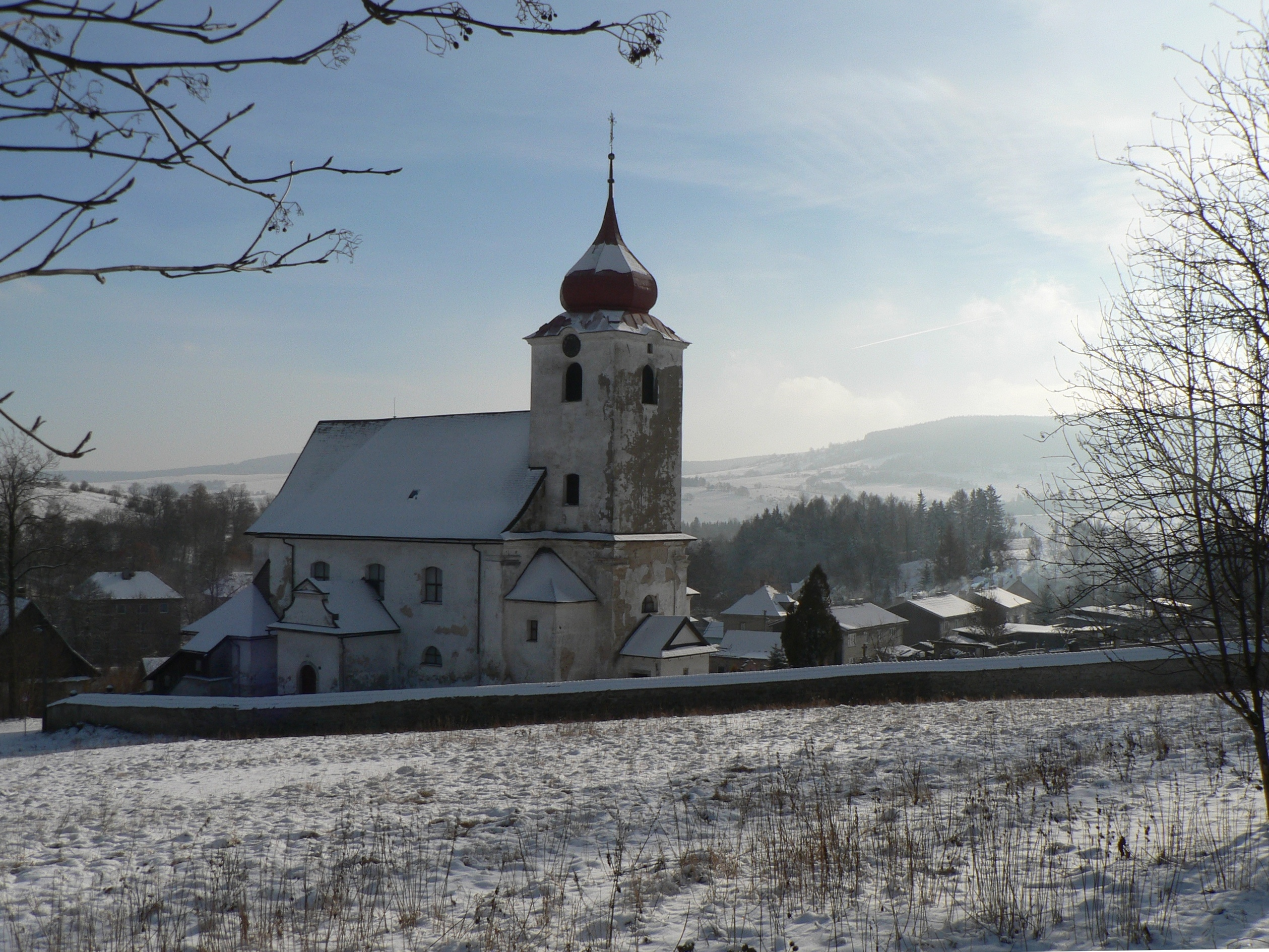
- Church of the Assumption of the Virgin Mary

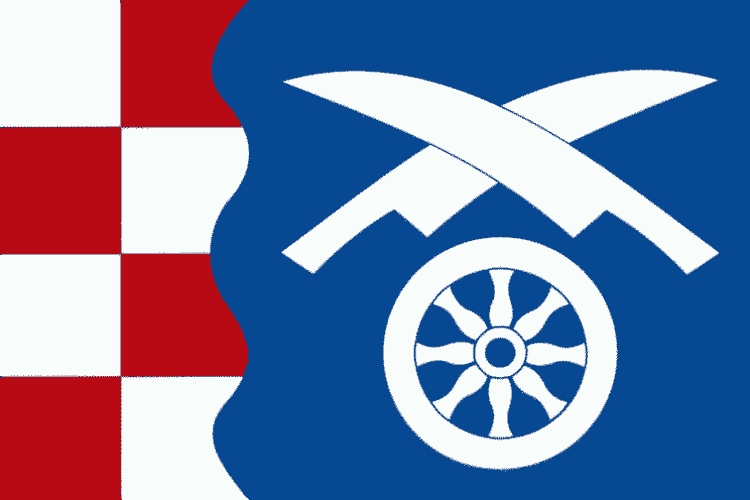
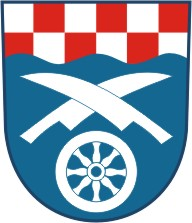
- Flag Coat of arms

- Location in the Czech Republic
- Coordinates: 50°5′48″N 16°49′39″E
- Country: Czech Republic
- Region: Olomouc
- District: Šumperk
- First mentioned: 1325

Area
  - Total: 68.28 km^{2} (26.36 sq mi)
- Elevation: 437 m (1,434 ft)

Population (2026-01-01)
  - Total: 511
  - Density: 7.48/km^{2} (19.4/sq mi)
- Time zone: UTC+1 (CET)
  - Summer (DST): UTC+2 (CEST)
- Postal codes: 788 33
- Website: www.obecmalamorava.cz

Malá Morava (German: Klein Mohrau) is a municipality and village in Šumperk District in the Olomouc Region of the Czech Republic. It has about 500 inhabitants.

Malá Morava lies approximately 19 kilometres (12 mi) north-west of Šumperk, 65 km (40 mi) north-west of Olomouc, and 172 km (107 mi) east of Prague.

== Administrative division ==
Malá Morava consists of nine municipal parts (in brackets population according to the 2021 census):

- Malá Morava (162)
- Křivá Voda (19)
- Podlesí (95)
- Sklené (24)
- Vlaské (15)
- Vojtíškov (107)
- Vysoká (15)
- Vysoký Potok (65)
- Zlatý Potok (13)

== Demographics ==
Historical population
Year	Pop.	±%
1869	4,124	—
1880	4,200	+1.8%
1890	4,094	−2.5%
1900	3,744	−8.5%
1910	3,585	−4.2%
1921	3,297	−8.0%
1930	3,139	−4.8%
1950	1,277	−59.3%
1961	1,148	−10.1%
1970	894	−22.1%
1980	701	−21.6%
1991	608	−13.3%
2001	588	−3.3%
2011	503	−14.5%
2021	515	+2.4%
Source: Censuses

== Notable people ==
- Hugo Simon (born 1942), Austrian show jumper, Olympic medalist
