= Hejnice =

Hejnice may refer to places in the Czech Republic:

- Hejnice (Liberec District), a town in the Liberec Region
- Hejnice (Ústí nad Orlicí District), a municipality and village in the Pardubice Region
