= Hejnice (Ústí nad Orlicí District) =

Municipality in the Czech Republic

- Municipality
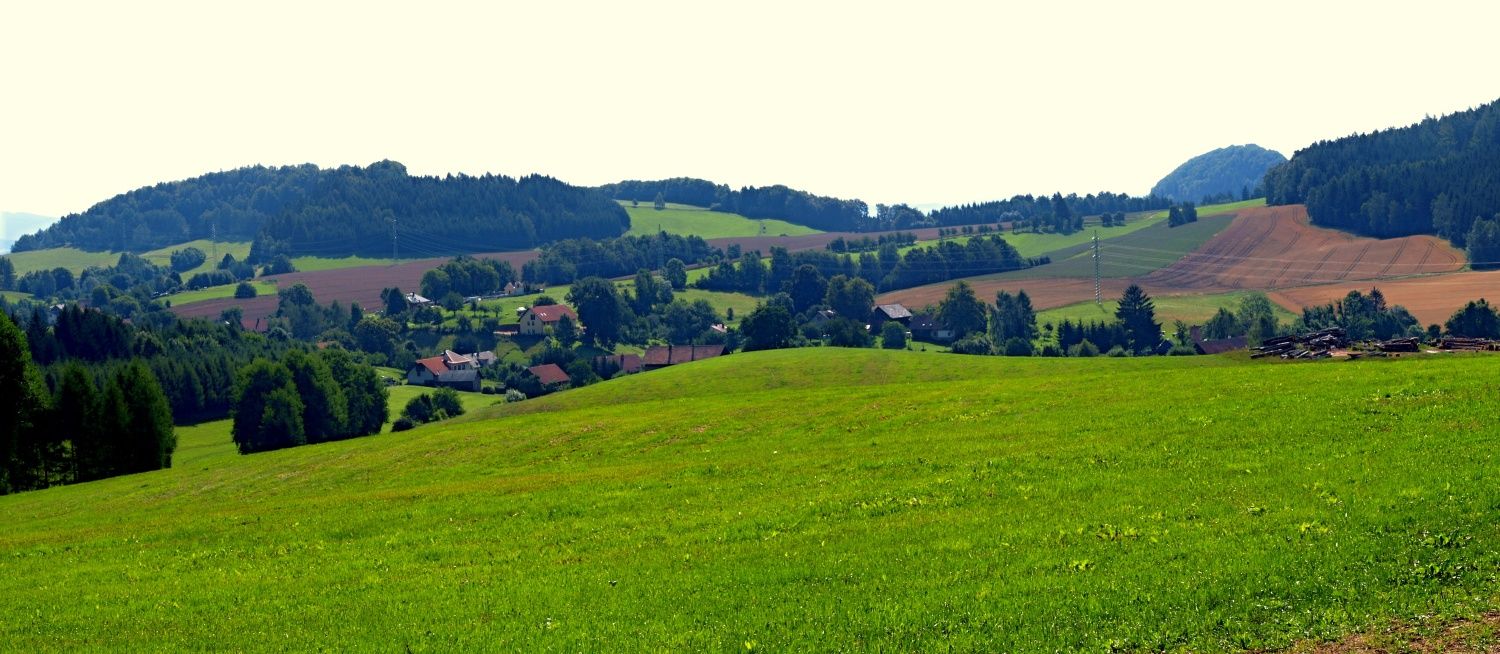
- General view

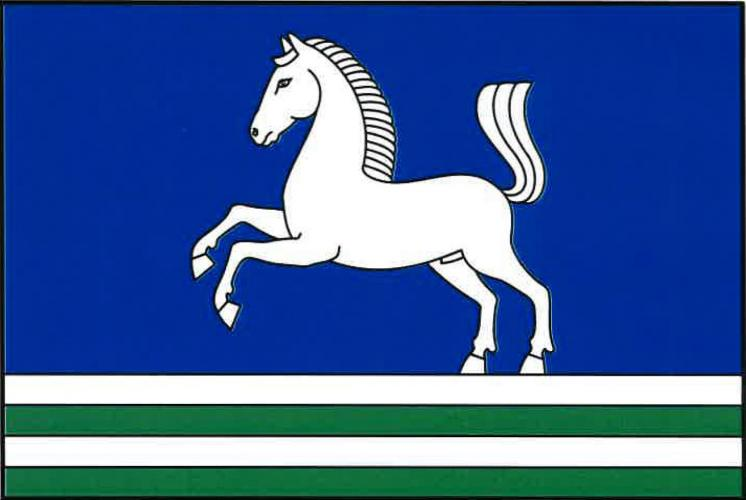
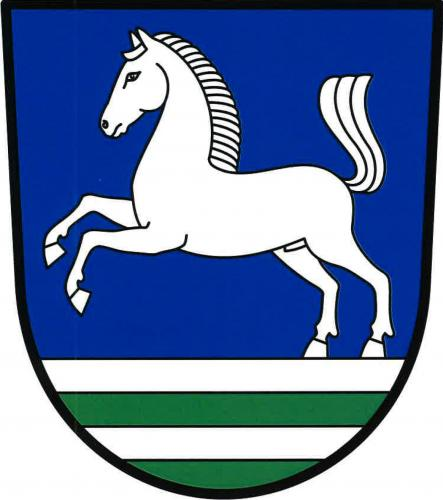
- Flag Coat of arms

- Location in the Czech Republic
- Coordinates: 50°3′21″N 16°23′58″E
- Country: Czech Republic
- Region: Pardubice
- District: Ústí nad Orlicí
- First mentioned: 1544

Area
  - Total: 4.83 km^{2} (1.86 sq mi)
- Elevation: 445 m (1,460 ft)

Population (2026-01-01)
  - Total: 214
  - Density: 44.3/km^{2} (115/sq mi)
- Time zone: UTC+1 (CET)
  - Summer (DST): UTC+2 (CEST)
- Postal code: 564 01
- Website: www.obechejnice.cz

Hejnice (Czech pronunciation: [ˈɦɛjɲɪtsɛ]; German: Heinitz) is a municipality and village in Ústí nad Orlicí District in the Pardubice Region of the Czech Republic. It has about 200 inhabitants.

== Administrative division ==
Hejnice consists of two municipal parts (in brackets population according to the 2021 census):

- Hejnice (191)
- Křížánky (14)

== Demographics ==
Historical population
Year	Pop.	±%
1869	327	—
1880	337	+3.1%
1890	370	+9.8%
1900	351	−5.1%
1910	308	−12.3%
1921	305	−1.0%
1930	281	−7.9%
1950	263	−6.4%
1961	279	+6.1%
1970	211	−24.4%
1980	196	−7.1%
1991	209	+6.6%
2001	203	−2.9%
2011	211	+3.9%
2021	205	−2.8%
Source: Censuses
