= List of castles =

This is a list of castles from around the world.

== By country ==
=== Africa ===
- Castles in Egypt
- Castles in Ethiopia
- Castles in Ghana
- Castles in Morocco
- Castles in Nigeria
- Castles in South Africa

=== Americas ===
- Castles in Brazil
- Castles in Canada
- Castles in Mexico
- Castles in the United States

=== Asia ===
- Castles in China
- Castles in India
- Castles in Iran
- Castles in Iraq
- Castles in Israel
- Castles in Japan
- Castles in Lebanon
- Castles in Pakistan
- Castles in Saudi Arabia
- Castles in Sri Lanka
- Castles in Syria

=== Europe ===
- Castles in Albania
- Castles in Armenia
- Castles in Austria
- Castles in Azerbaijan
- Castles in Belarus
- Castles in Belgium
- Castles in Bosnia and Herzegovina
- Castles in Bulgaria
- Castles in Croatia
- Castles in Cyprus
- Castles in the Czech Republic
- Castles in Denmark
- Castles in Estonia
- Castles in Finland
- Castles in France
- Castles in Germany
- Castles in Greece
- Castles in Hungary
- Castles in Ireland
- Castles in Italy
- Castles in Latvia
- Castles in Liechtenstein
- Castles in Lithuania
- Castles in Luxembourg
- Castles in Malta
- Castles in the Netherlands
- Castles in North Macedonia
- Castles in Norway
- Castles in Poland
- Castles in Portugal
- Castles in Romania
- Castles in Russia
- Castles in Serbia
- Castles in Slovakia
- Castles in Slovenia
- Castles in Spain
- Castles in Sweden
- Castles in Switzerland
- Castles in Turkey
- Castles in Ukraine
- Castles in the United Kingdom

== By continent ==
- List of castles in Africa
- List of castles in Europe
- Lists of castles in North America

== By type ==
- List of Kurdish castles
- List of Crusader castles
- List of motte-and-bailey castles
- List of Ismaili castles

== In fiction ==
- List of fictional castles

== See also ==
- Castle
- Citadel
- Fortification / List of fortifications
- Palace / List of palaces
- List of buildings
- List of forts
