= List of castles in Mexico =

This is a list of castles in Mexico.

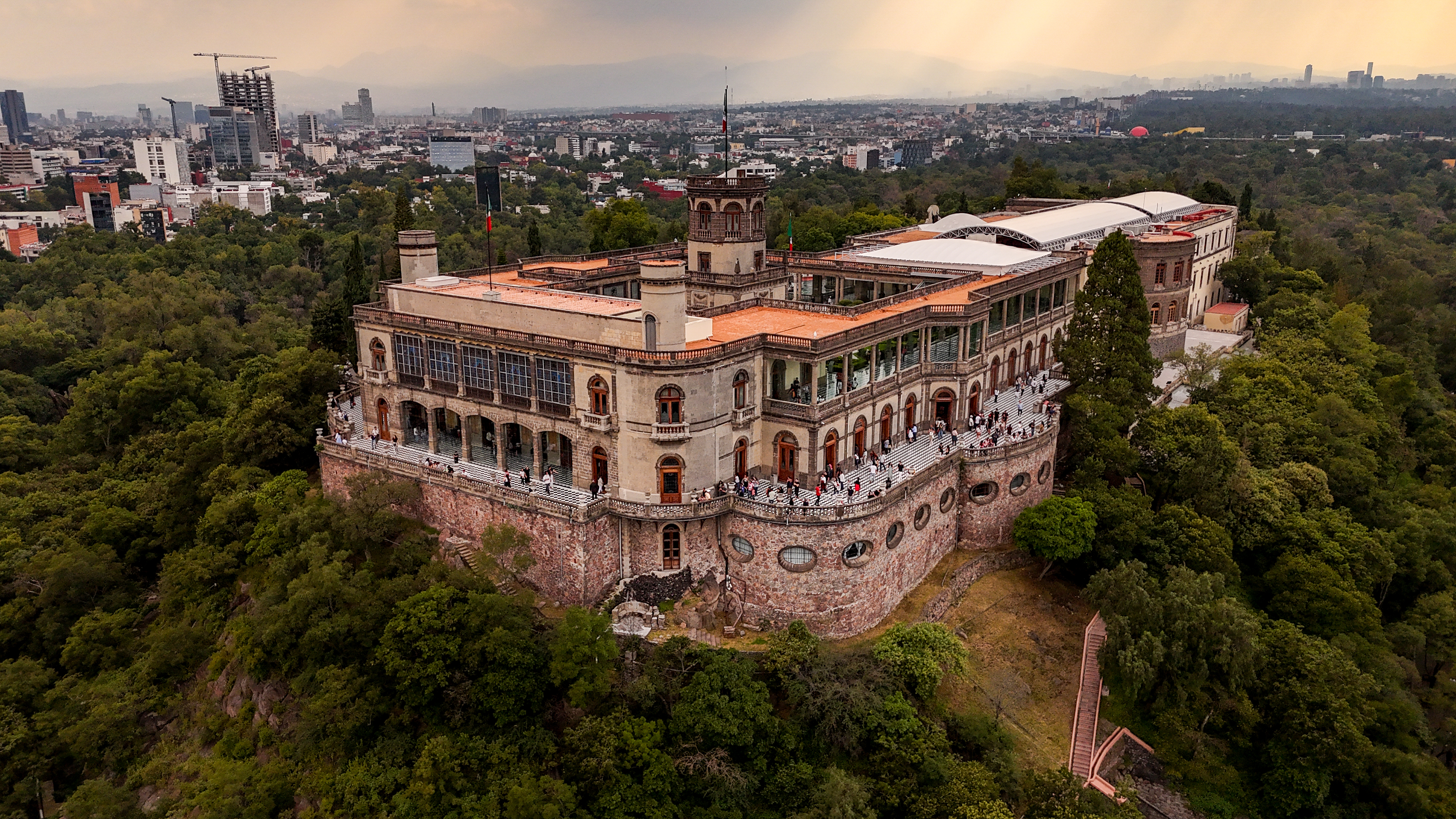
Chapultepec Castle, Mexico City

- Chapultepec Castle, Mexico City
- Castillo Douglas, Aguascalientes
- Hotel Castillo Santa Cecilia, Guanajuato
- Palace of Cortés, Cuernavaca
- San Juan de Ulúa, Veracruz

== See also ==
- List of castles
- Palace of Iturbide, another Imperial residence in Mexico.
