= List of fictional castles =

This is a list of fictional castles.

== Animation and television ==
- Candy Queen's Castle, from Adventure Time: Fionna and Cake
- Castle Duckula, the home of Count Duckula
- The Crystal Castle, from the TV series She-Ra: Princess of Power
- Castle Grayskull, from the He-Man Masters of the Universe cartoon series
- Castle Lemongrab, from Adventure Time
- Castle Wyvern, in Gargoyles
- Death's Castle, from Adventure Time
- Dreamland Castle, from Disenchantment
- Ice King's Castle, from Adventure Time
- Katz Kastle, from Courage the Cowardly Dog
- Muscle Princess's castle, from Adventure Time
- Princess Bubblegum's castle, from Adventure Time
- Princess Loolilalu's castle, from The Amazing Digital Circus
- Skull Castle, from Adventure Time
- The Winter King's Castle, from Adventure Time: Fionna and Cake
- Vampire King's Castle, from Adventure Time: Fionna and Cake
- Water Lily Pad Castle, from Adventure Time

== Books and literature ==
A

- Aberwyvern Castle, from the 1983 book Castle by David Macaulay and its companion 1986 PBS program
- The Adamant Tower, from The Amber Spyglass
- Castle Amber, from The Chronicles of Amber

B

- Blandings Castle, from P. G. Wodehouse's stories

C

- Castle Dracula, from Bram Stoker's Dracula
- Castle Caladan, from Dune
- The Clouded Mountain, from The Amber Spyglass
- Kaer Morhen, from The Witcher

D

- The Dark Tower, the titular location in The Dark Tower by Stephen King
- Doubting Castle, from The Pilgrim's Progress

G

- Gormenghast from the Gormenghast series of novels

H

- Hagedorn Castle, the titular castle from The Last Castle by Jack Vance
- Hogwarts Castle, from the Harry Potter series
- Howl's Moving Castle, the titular castle from Howl's Moving Castle by Diana Wynne Jones

K

- Kiamo Ko, from The Wicked Years

O

- The titular castle from The Castle of Otranto

R

- Rosengåva, from Skuggserien by Maria Gripe

T

- The titular castle from The Castle by Franz Kafka
- Torquilstone, from Ivanhoe

U

- Udolpho, from Ann Radcliffe's The Mysteries of Udolpho

V

- Lord Valentine's Castle, from the Majipoor series by Robert Silverberg

Y

- Yalding Towers, from The Enchanted Castle

=== Book series ===
==== A Song of Ice and Fire ====
- Castamere from A Song of Ice and Fire by George R. R. Martin
- Casterly Rock from A Song of Ice and Fire by George R. R. Martin
- Castle Black, from A Song of Ice and Fire by George R. R. Martin
- Dragonstone, from A Song of Ice and Fire by George R. R. Martin
- The Eyrie, from A Song of Ice and Fire by George R. R. Martin
- Harrenhal, from A Song of Ice and Fire by George R. R. Martin
- The Hightower, from A Song of Ice and Fire by George R. R. Martin
- Highgarden, from A Song of Ice and Fire by George R. R. Martin
- Pyke, from A Song of Ice and Fire by George R. R. Martin
- The Red Keep, from A Song of Ice and Fire by George R. R. Martin
- Riverrun, from A Song of Ice and Fire by George R. R. Martin
- Storms End, from A Song of Ice and Fire by George R. R. Martin
- Sunspear, from A Song of Ice and Fire by George R. R. Martin
- Winterfell, from A Song of Ice and Fire by George R. R. Martin

==== The Chronicles of Narnia ====
- Anvard, from The Chronicles of Narnia by C. S. Lewis
- Cair Paravel, from The Chronicles of Narnia by C. S. Lewis
- White Witch's Castle, from The Chronicles of Narnia by C. S. Lewis

==== Tolkien universe ====
- Amon Sûl, from The Lord of the Rings by J. R. R. Tolkien
- Barad-dûr, from The Lord of the Rings by J. R. R. Tolkien
- Dol Guldur, from The Lord of the Rings by J. R. R. Tolkien
- Isengard, from The Lord of the Rings by J. R. R. Tolkien
- The Hornburg, from The Lord of the Rings by J. R. R. Tolkien
- Minas Tirith, from The Lord of the Rings by J. R. R. Tolkien
- Minas Morgul (formerly Minas Ithil), from The Lord of the Rings by J. R. R. Tolkien

== Comics ==
- Marlinspike Hall, from The Adventures of Tintin
- The Royal Castle, from the Sonic the Hedgehog series

== Films ==
B

- The Bombursts Castle in Vulgaria, from the film Chitty Chitty Bang Bang

C

- Castle Aaaaarrrggh!, from the 1975 film Monty Python and the Holy Grail
- Castle Anthrax, from Monty Python and the Holy Grail

H

- Howl's Moving Castle by Studio Ghibli

L

- Laputa: Castle in the Sky by Hayao Miyazaki

U

- The Castle of Ultimate Darkness, from Time Bandits

== Games ==
B

- Brennenburg, castle in East Prussia near Königsberg in Amnesia: The Dark Descent

C

- Dracula's Castle in the Castlevania video game series

D

- Disney Castle, from Kingdom Hearts II

O

- Osohe Castle, in Mother 3

R

- Castle Ravenloft, from the Dungeons & Dragons adventure module written by Tracy and Laura Hickman

W

- Wolfenstein, castle in the Wolfenstein game series

=== Game franchises ===
==== The Elder Scrolls ====
- Anvil Castle, from The Elder Scrolls IV: Oblivion
- Castle Bravil, from The Elder Scrolls IV: Oblivion
- Castle Bruma, from The Elder Scrolls IV: Oblivion
- Castle Chorrol, from The Elder Scrolls IV: Oblivion
- Castle Dour, from The Elder Scrolls V: Skyrim
- Castle Kvatch, from The Elder Scrolls IV: Oblivion
- Castle Leyawiin, from The Elder Scrolls IV: Oblivion
- Castle Skingrad, from The Elder Scrolls IV: Oblivion
- Castle Volkihar, from The Elder Scrolls V: Skyrim
- Cheydinhal Castle, from The Elder Scrolls IV: Oblivion
- Dragonsreach, from The Elder Scrolls V: Skyrim
- Fort Dawnguard, from The Elder Scrolls V: Skyrim
- Mistveil Keep, from The Elder Scrolls V: Skyrim
- Palace of the Kings, from The Elder Scrolls V: Skyrim
- The Blue Palace, from The Elder Scrolls V: Skyrim
- Understone Keep, from The Elder Scrolls V: Skyrim

==== Mario franchise ====
- Bowser's Castle, from the Mario franchise series
- Castle Bleck, from Super Paper Mario
- Princess Peach's Castle, from the Mario series

==== Overwatch ====
- Eichenwalde, from Overwatch
- Shimada Castle, from Overwatch

==== The Legend of Zelda ====
- Hyrule Castle, from The Legend of Zelda

== Myths and legends ==
C

- Camelot, from Arthurian legend

== Opera ==
- Castle Adamant, from Princess Ida
- Castle Bunthorne, from Patience
- Monsalvat, the castle of the Knights of the Grail in Wagner's operas Parsifal and Lohengrin
- Ruddigore Castle, from Ruddigore

== Other ==
=== Lego ===
- Vampyre Castle, from Lego Monster Fighters

== See also ==
- List of castles
