= Castlevania Puzzle: Encore of the Night =

2010 video game

- Developer: Konami
- Publisher: Konami
- Series: Castlevania
- Platforms: iOS, Windows Phone
- Release: iOS; July 21, 2010; Windows Phone; January 18, 2011
- Genres: Puzzle, role-playing
- Mode: Single-player

Castlevania Puzzle: Encore of the Night is a 2010 Castlevania puzzle game featuring Alucard and other Castlevania: Symphony of the Night characters for iOS and Windows Phone. It retells the story of Symphony of the Night. It features a role-playing game system and touched up sprites. The game was released on iOS on July 21, 2010, and for Windows Phone on January 18, 2011.

== Reception ==
Reception

Aggregate score
Aggregator	Score
Metacritic	80/100

Review scores
Publication	Score
1Up.com	A−
Destructoid	7/10
GamePro	5/5
Gamezebo	100/100
IGN	7.4/10
Joystiq	4/5
MacLife	4/5
Pocket Gamer	4/5
TouchArcade	4.5/5

The iOS version received favorable reviews according to the review aggregation website Metacritic.

Game Informer's Tim Turi called it his "go-to puzzle game" on his iPhone in part due to its use of Symphony of the Night's sprites.

== See also ==
- Taisen Puzzle-Dama
