= Ilha Fiscal =

Island in Guanabara Bay, Brazil

- Island
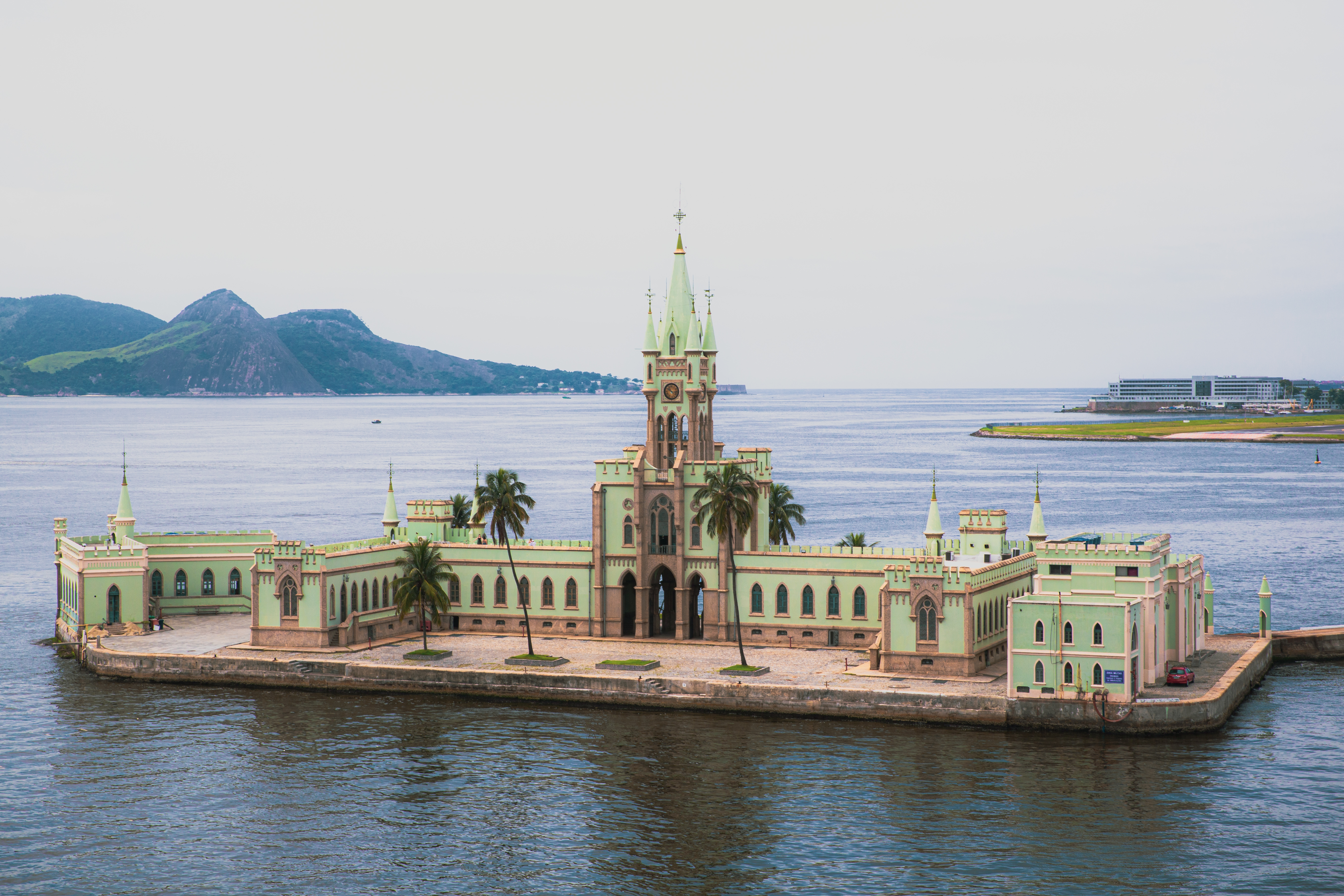
- Interactive map of Ilha Fiscal
- Location within Rio de Janeiro Location within Rio de Janeiro (state) Location within Brazil
- Coordinates: 22°53′49″S 43°09′59″W
- Country: Brazil
- State: Rio de Janeiro
- Municipality: Rio de Janeiro
- Administrative region: Centro

Area
  - Total: 0.01 km^{2} (0.0039 sq mi)
- Bordered by: Guanabara Bay

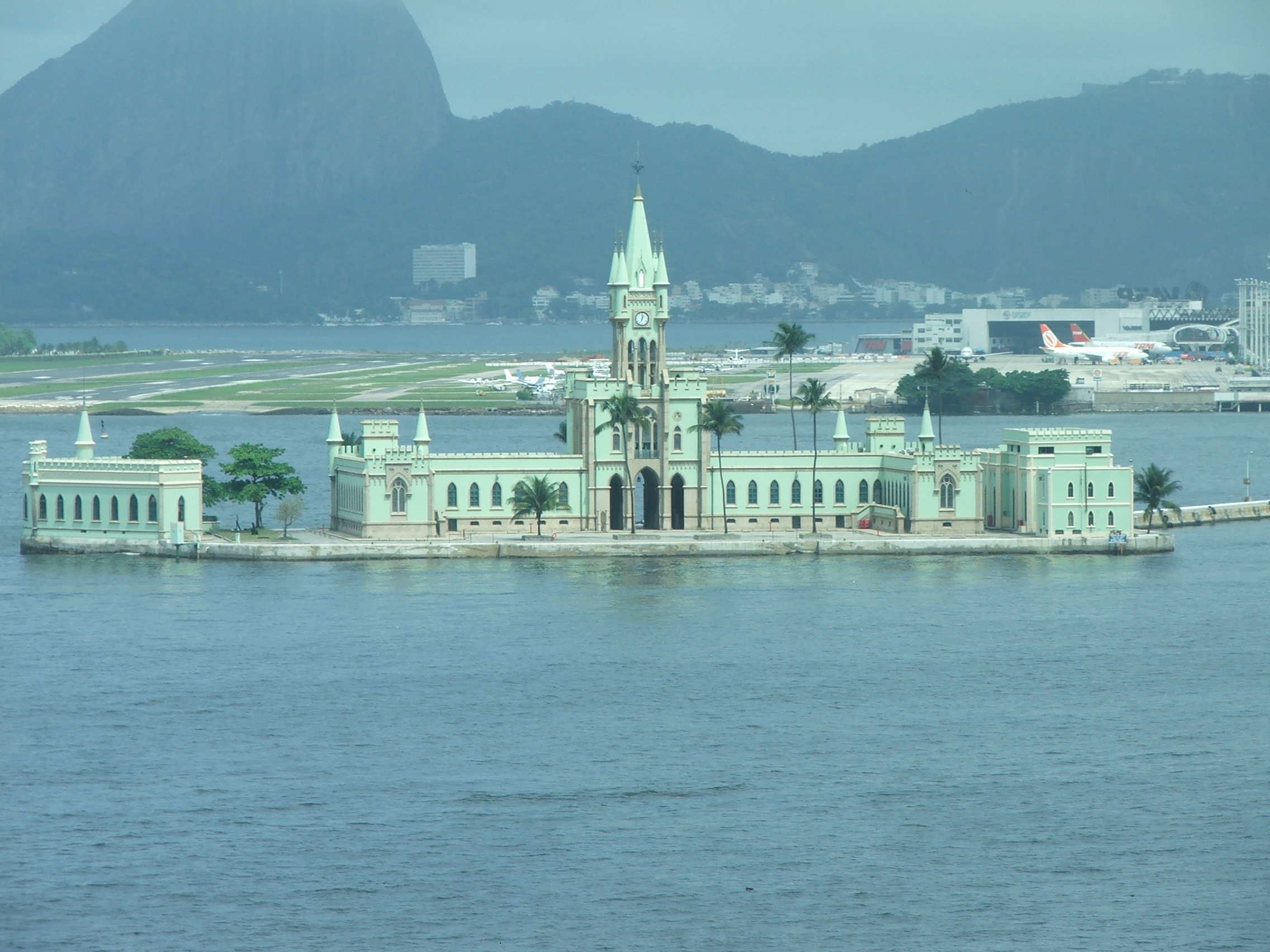
Ilha Fiscal, 2004

Ilha Fiscal, or Fiscal Island, is an island in Guanabara Bay, bordering the historic city center of Rio de Janeiro, in southeastern Brazil.

Originally named by Europeans as Rat Island (Portuguese: Ilha dos Ratos), its current name comes from the fact that the customs department has been stationed there before Guarda Fiscal, serving the port of the then-capital of the Empire during the nineteenth century. The customs offices were housed at a Neo-Gothic palace built under Pedro II, (Note: Erroneously stated as Pedro I by John Waggoner.) which occupies most of the island. The island became famous as the site of the famous Fiscal Island Ball (Portuguese: Baile da Ilha Fiscal), the last royal ball of the Empire before the coup d'état that proclaimed the Republic in November 1889.

== History ==
During the Fiscal Island Ball (Portuguese: Baile da Ilha Fiscal), held on 9 November 1889 (Note: For his part, Jeffrey David Needell erroneously states 19 October as the date of the event.) and considered "the last ball of the Empire," Afonso Celso, Viscount of Ouro Preto, Deodato Cesino Vilella dos Santos, João da Costa Lima e Castro and Saldanha da Gama were members of the reception committee. The ball was in honor of a visiting Chilean delegation of naval men, with an alleged attendance of six thousand guests. An often repeated legend states that after the ball 8 bodices, 17 silk pillows, 3 corsets, 17 garters and 9 epaulets were found on the island.

During the Revolt of the Lash, on 23 November 1910, the Brazilian battleship São Paulo was located off the island and headed out of the bay unscathed. Aurélio de Figueiredo painted The Last Dance of Ilha Fiscal (Portuguese: O Último baile da Ilha Fiscal), based on the 1889 ball, in 1905. Since 1914, the Navy's Directorate of Hydrography and Navigation (Portuguese: Diretoria de Hidrografia e Navegação) has been based on Ilha Fiscal. After the Oceanographic Institute of the University of São Paulo, the Directorate was the second institution in Brazil to carry out oceanographic research. Monica Hirst argumented before the meeting that resulted in the 1994 Protocol of Ouro Preto that it should not be compared to the Ilha Fiscal Ball. In 2002, businessman Alexandre Accioly celebrated his 40th birthday at Ilha Fiscal. As part of the 2005 Rio Fashion Week, designer Clara Vasconcelos showcased the Tessuti 2006 summer collection runway show held on a runway with 150 seat capacity in the form of an "A". During the Mensalão scandal, presidential advisor Ricardo Kotscho made a public statement which Folha de S.Paulo journalist Clóvis Rossi compared to the infamous ball, "where the court danced while the monarchy collapsed."

The New York Times' Marlise Simons considers the former-Customs House a "preposterous neo-Gothic edifice of green turrets."

Ilha Fiscal now hosts a museum of cultural history housed in the that is maintained by the Navy of Brazil. Boat and land tours depart the nearby Navy Cultural Center and travel to and around Ilha Fiscal.

== See also ==
- Guanabara Bay topics
- List of castles in Brazil
