= Taisen Puzzle-dama =

Series of puzzle video games

- Genre: Puzzle
- Developer: Konami
- Publisher: Konami
- First release: Taisen Puzzle-dama; July 1994
- Latest release: Magical Academy Taisen Puzzle-dama; February 17, 2011

Taisen Puzzle-dama (Note: Japanese: 対戦ぱずるだま; lit. "Battle Puzzle Ball") is a series of Tile-matching video games developed and published by Konami. The first game, Taisen Puzzle-dama (1994), was released for arcades, and numerous sequels were created for home consoles.

== Gameplay ==
The gameplay of the series is similar to other matching-based puzzle games, such as Puyo Puyo, being a battle game between one player and either a human or CPU opponent. Balls will descend down the screen, in colours red, yellow, blue, or green. These balls can be either "large balls" (おおだま, Ōdama) or "small balls" (こだま, Kodama), the latter of which appear "locked" in square boxes. Large balls are cleared if three or more are touching horizontally or vertically. When a large ball is cleared next to a small ball, that small ball is "unlocked" and becomes a large ball, and so can be matched with. If a combo of matches occurs, those balls are converted into "attack balls" (こうげきだま, Kougeki dama), which results in small balls being added to the opponent's side, in a different pattern for each character.

The ball types are as follows:

- Large Ball (おおだま, Ōdama): Basic ball type, can be matched.
- Small Ball (こだま, Kodama): Appear "locked" and can be unlocked by matching large balls next to them.
- Good Ball (ぜんだま, Zendama): Introduced in Susume! Taisen Puzzle-dama, these balls are white in colour, and when they land, they convert all adjacent small balls to large balls.
- Evil Ball (あくだま, Akudama): Introduced in Susume! Taisen Puzzle-dama, these balls are black in colour, and when they land, they convert all adjacent large balls to small balls.
- Eating Ball (くいだま, Kuidama): Introduced in Susume! Taisen Puzzle-dama, these balls are purple in colour, and are oriented in a certain direction. Where they land, they continue in the direction they are facing, "eating" small balls and removing them from the field. They stop when they reach the edge of the field or a large ball. They then convert the last small ball they "ate" into a large ball.

== Games in the series ==
- Taisen Puzzle-dama (1994; Arcade)
- Tsuyoshi Shikkari Shinasai: Taisen Puzzle-dama (1994; Super Famicom) - Tsuyoshi Shikkari Shinasai themed
- TwinBee Taisen Puzzle-dama (1994; PlayStation) - TwinBee themed
- Tokimeki Memorial Taisen Puzzle-dama (1995; Arcade, PlayStation, Sega Saturn, Windows 95, PlayStation Network) - Tokimeki Memorial themed
- Chibi Maruko-chan no Taisen Puzzle-dama (1995; Sega Saturn) - Chibi Maruko-chan themed
- Susume! Taisen Puzzle-dama (1996; Arcade, PlayStation) - sequel to the original 1994 arcade game
- Susume! Taisen Puzzle Dama: Tōkon! Marutama Chō (1998; Nintendo 64) - port of the 1996 game
- Puzzle-dama (2001; mobile phones)
- Tokimeki Memorial 2 Taisen Puzzle-dama (2001; PlayStation) - Tokimeki Memorial 2 themed
- Puzzle-dama DX (2003; mobile phones)
- Wagamama Fairy Mirmo de Pon! Taisen Mahō-dama (2003; Game Boy Advance) - Mirmo! themed
- Pop'n Taisen Puzzle-dama Online (2004; PlayStation 2) - Pop'n Music themed
- Tokimeki Memorial Girl's Side Taisen Puzzle-dama (December 2004; mobile phones) - Tokimeki Memorial Girl's Side themed
- Hell Girl Taisen Puzzle-dama (2007; mobile phones) - Hell Girl themed
- Hayate no Gotoku!! Taisen Puzzle-dama (2009; mobile phones) - Hayate the Combat Butler themed
- Castlevania Puzzle: Encore of the Night (2010; iOS, Windows Phone) - Castlevania themed
- Magical Academy Taisen Puzzle-dama (2011; mobile phones) - Quiz Magic Academy themed

== Spin-offs ==
- A part of Konami Taisen Colosseum series
- Puzzle de Knight (Mitsumete Knight)
- Moeru! Taisen Puzzle-dama (LovePlus +)
- Puzzle-dama Eleven (Winning Eleven Mobile)
- New LovePlus
