= Tsuyoshi Shikkari Shinasai =

Japanese manga series and its franchise

- First tankōbon volume cover, featuring Tsuyoshi Igawa (left) and Keiko Igawa (right)

ツヨシしっかりしなさい
- Genre: Comedy
- Manga
- Written by: Kiyoshi Nagamatsu
- Published by: Kodansha
- Imprint: Morning KC
- Magazine: Morning
- Original run: 1986 – 1990
- Volumes: 19
- Television drama
- Directed by: Shunichi Hirano
- Written by: Noriko Goto
- Licensed by: Nippon Television
- Original network: Nippon Television Network System
- Original run: February 22, 1989 – July 26, 1989
- Episodes: 16
- Anime television series
- Directed by: Shin Misawa
- Produced by: Kōji Kaneda; Hiromichi Mogaki
- Music by: Kuniaki Haishima
- Studio: Studio Comet
- Original network: Fuji Television
- Original run: October 4, 1992 – December 25, 1994
- Episodes: 112
- Manga

Tsuyoshi Motto Shikkari Shinasai
- Written by: Kiyoshi Nagamatsu
- Published by: Kodansha
- Imprint: Afternoon KC
- Magazine: Monthly Afternoon
- Original run: December 25, 1992 – September 24, 1994
- Volumes: 5
- Anime film

Tsuyoshi Shikkari Shinasai: Tsuyoshi no Time Machine de Shikkari Shinasai
- Directed by: Shin Misawa
- Produced by: Kōji Kaneda; Hiromichi Mogaki
- Written by: Takashi Yamada
- Music by: Kuniaki Haishima
- Studio: Studio Comet; Fuji Television
- Licensed by: Toei Company
- Released: December 5, 1993
- Runtime: 30 minutes
- Video game

Tsuyoshi Shikkari Shinasai: Taisen Puzzle-dama
- Developer: Konami
- Publisher: Konami
- Music by: Kenichi Matsubara; Hideto Inoue; Masahiro Ikariko; Harumi Ueko; Kazuhiko Uehara
- Genre: Puzzle
- Platform: Super Famicom
- Released: JP: November 18, 1994
- Manga

Tsuyoshi Shikkari² Shinasai
- Written by: Kiyoshi Nagamatsu
- Published by: Kodansha
- Imprint: Morning KC
- Magazine: Morning
- Original run: April 12, 2001 – December 5, 2002
- Volumes: 6
- Manga

Tsuyoshi-kun Shikkari Shinasai
- Written by: Kiyoshi Nagamatsu
- Published by: Kodansha
- Magazine: Michao!
- Original run: October 2007 – 2008
- icon

Tsuyoshi Shikkari Shinasai (Japanese: ツヨシしっかりしなさい; lit. 'Tsuyoshi, Hold Tight') is a Japanese manga series written and illustrated by Kiyoshi Nagamatsu. It was originally serialized in Kodansha's seinen manga magazine Morning from 1986 to 1990, with its chapters collected in 19 tankōbon volumes. It was adapted into a live-action television drama in 1989, and an anime television series in 1992. A film based on the anime was released in December 1993.

Three sequel manga series were made after the original manga's conclusion, each depicting a different stage in Tsuyoshi's life. The first, titled Tsuyoshi Motto Shikkari Shinasai, ran in Kodansha's seinen manga magazine Monthly Afternoon from December 1992 to September 1994. The second, titled Tsuyoshi Shikkari² Shinasai, ran in Morning from April 2001 to December 2002. The third, titled Tsuyoshi-kun Shikkari Shinasai, ran in Kodansha's web service Michao! in October 2007.

== Synopsis ==
High school teenager and academic underachiever Tsuyoshi Igawa (pronounced "Ikawa" in the anime) lives with his two attractive and brilliant older sisters, Keiko and Noriko, his mother Yoshiko, and his father Hideo. When Hideo leaves for work in Hakata-ku, Tsuyoshi then becomes responsible for all of the housework. As well, his sisters and mother are incapable of helping out with chores and are often unusually aggressive with him. Nevertheless, Tsuyoshi manages to have a fun and unique life with them and his friends.

== Characters ==
Tsuyoshi Igawa (井川 強, Igawa Tsuyoshi; also spelled as ツヨシ)
Voiced by: Masaya Onosaka
Portrayed by: Katsuyuki Mori
A high school student who attends Ishigami High School, he excels at everything except academics and studying, being second last in his class. He is especially good at sports and housework, though he reluctantly complies with whatever Keiko, Noriko, and Yoshiko demands of him. He maintains a carefree personality regardless.
Keiko Igawa (井川 恵子, Igawa Keiko)
Voiced by: Hiromi Tsuru
Tsuyoshi's oldest sister who works as a department store receptionist. She was top 10 in her class in Ishigami High School before graduating, and was even made vice president of the student council. She has a strong-willed personality, and has a tendency to drink alcohol often.
Noriko Igawa (井川 典子, Igawa Noriko)
Voiced by: Junko Hagimori
Tsuyoshi's second oldest sister who works part-time. She was top 20 in her class in Ishigami High School before graduating. Compared to Keiko and Yoshiko, she is less harsh on Tsuyoshi. She resembles Yoshiko at a younger age.
Yoshiko Igawa (井川 美子, Igawa Yoshiko)
Voiced by: Tomie Kataoka
Tsuyoshi's mother. She has an overweight figure in her middle age, although she was originally beautiful in her youth. She is bad at housework, and often bosses Tsuyoshi around.
Tsukasa Watanabe (渡辺 司, Watanabe Tsukasa)
Voiced by: Shigeru Chiba
Tsuyoshi's childhood friend who attends Ishigami High School. He is bad at academics, being constantly last in his class. He has perverted tendencies, and despite his efforts, cannot get a girlfriend.
Mai Ishikawa (石川 舞, Ishikawa Mai)
Voiced by: Minami Takayama
Tsuyoshi's girlfriend who works at her family-owned bento shop. She attends a different high school from Tsuyoshi, and has a first-degree black belt in aikido.
Hideo Igawa (井川 秀夫, Igawa Hideo)
Voiced by: Tetsuo Sakaguchi
Tsuyoshi's father who works away from home in Hakata-ku. He is skilled in housework.
Keiko (ケイコ)
Voiced by: Wataru Takagi
The Igawa family's pet dog.

== Media ==
=== Manga ===
Written and illustrated by Kiyoshi Nagamatsu, Tsuyoshi Shikkari Shinasai was serialized in Kodansha's seinen manga magazine Morning from 1986 to 1990. The first chapter was published in a special issue of Morning, Morning Magnum Zōkan, cover dated February 13, 1986. Kodansha compiled its chapters in 19 tankōbon volumes, released from September 16, 1986, to November 20, 1990.

A second manga series written and illustrated by Nagamatsu, titled Tsuyoshi Motto Shikkari Shinasai (ツヨシもっとしっかりしなさい; lit. 'Tsuyoshi, Hold Tight More'), was serialized in Kodansha's seinen manga magazine Monthly Afternoon from December 25, 1992, (Note: Debuted in the magazine's February 1993 issue, released on December 25, 1992.) to September 24, 1994. (Note: Finished in the magazine's November 1994 issue, released on September 24, 1994.) It depicts the life of Tsuyoshi during his middle school years. Kodansha compiled its chapters in five tankōbon volumes, released from May 22, 1993, to July 22, 1994; only the chapters leading up to the magazine's June 1994 issue were compiled. (Note: The magazine's June 1994 issue was published on April 25, 1994.)

A third manga series written and illustrated by Nagamatsu, titled Tsuyoshi Shikkari² Shinasai (ツヨシしっかり²しなさい; pronounced Tsuyoshi Shikkari Shikkari Shinasai), was serialized in Kodansha's Morning magazine from April 12, 2001, (Note: Debuted in the magazine's 19th issue of 2001, released on April 12 of that year.) to December 5, 2002. (Note: Finished in the magazine's first issue of 2003, released on December 5, 2002.) It depicts the life of Tsuyoshi in his adult years, after the events of the first series. Kodansha compiled its chapters in six tankōbon volumes, released from May 23, 2002, to December 20, 2002.

A fourth manga series written and illustrated by Nagamatsu, titled Tsuyoshi-kun Shikkari Shinasai (ツヨシくんしっかりしなさい), was serialized in Kodansha's web service Michao! in October 2007, depicting the life of Tsuyoshi in his elementary school years. A total of ten chapters were published.

Tsuyoshi is a minor character in Torao-san no Okiniiri (虎男さんのお気に入り), a separate manga series by Nagamatsu. He also appears in the manga series Tetsubon (テツぼん) as the CEO of a food company, illustrated by Nagamatsu, written by Enshu Takahashi, and serialized in Big Comic Original magazine.

=== Live-action series ===
A live-action television drama series adaptation of the manga was produced by Nippon Television and aired on NNS from February 22 to July 26, 1989, for a total of 16 episodes. The role of Tsuyoshi was originally given to Yoshiaki Takahashi, but following his death after a traffic accident, the role was instead given to Katsuyuki Mori.

=== Anime ===
==== TV series ====
An anime series adaptation of the manga was produced by Studio Comet and broadcast on Fuji Television. It was directed by Shin Misawa with planning by Kenji Shimizu, produced by Kōji Kaneda and Hiromichi Mogaki, and music composed by Kuniaki Haishima. It replaced Chibi Maruko-chan's timeslot which had went on hiatus at the time. 112 episodes were aired in total, from October 4, 1992, to December 25, 1994. The anime was a hit in Japan and maintained viewership ratings in the high teens during its run; according to the Nikkan Sports newspaper near the end of its run, its viewership rating had reached a peak of 23.7% in one week in December 1994, higher than Dragon Ball Z which had 20.5%. The anime was later re-broadcast on Animax starting on October 31, 2017. The anime was never released on home video.

Three opening themes were made for the show: "Sayonara Bunmei" (さよなら文明; 'Goodbye Civilization') by Bakufu Slump, "Re-Play" by L'eclipse, and "Love You Only" by Tokio. Six ending themes were made for the show: "Namida3" (涙3; 'Tears 3') by Bakufu Slump, "Kekkon Shiyoune" (結婚しようね; 'Let's Get Married') by Wink, "Good Day I-N-G" by Maki Kanzaki, "Sono Ki ni Sasenaide" (その気にさせないで) by Maki Kanzaki, "Okiraku Musume wa Aloha 'Oe" (お気楽娘はアロハオエ) by Buka-Buka, and "Toshishita no Otokonoko" (年下の男の子) by Sexy Mates. The original soundtrack album was released by Sony on July 21, 1994.

==== Film ====
A film based on the anime, titled Tsuyoshi Shikkari Shinasai: Tsuyoshi no Time Machine de Shikkari Shinasai (ツヨシしっかりしなさい ツヨシのタイムマシーンでしっかりしなさい; 'Hold Tight with Tsuyoshi's Time Machine'), premiered in Japan on December 5, 1993. It was distributed by Toei Company as a triple bill feature with Sailor Moon R: The Movie and Make Up! Sailor Guardians. The film is about Tsuyoshi and Tsukasa accidentally boarding a time machine and being sent 12 years into the past, where they run into Tsuyoshi and Keiko's past selves.

=== Video game ===
A puzzle video game, titled Tsuyoshi Shikkari Shinasai: Taisen Puzzle-dama, was published by Konami exclusively in Japan for the Super Famicom on November 18, 1994. It is part of the Taisen Puzzle-dama series.
