= List of castles in Lebanon =

Citadel of Raymond de Saint-Gilles

This is an alphabetical list of castles in Lebanon.

- Beaufort Castle, Lebanon
- Beirut Castle (demolished)
- Belhacem
- Byblos Castle
- Scandelion Castle or Kherbet Iskandaroûna in Chamaa
- Citadel of Raymond de Saint-Gilles or Tripoli Castle
- Deir Kifa Castle
- Doubiye Castle
- Gibelacar
- Hasbaya Castle
- Iaal Castle
- Lion Tower
- Moinetre
- Moussa Castle
- Mseilha Fort
- Saint Louis Castle or Qalaat Al Muizz
- Sidon Sea Castle
- Smar Jbeil
- Toron

== See also ==
- List of castles
- List of Crusader castles
