= Junko Hagimori =

Japanese voice actress

- 萩森 侚子
- Born: October 20, 1964 (age 61); Hyōgo, Japan
- Occupation: Voice actress

Junko Hagimori (萩森 侚子, Hagimori Junko; born 萩森 順子, October 20, 1964 in Hyōgo) is a Japanese voice actress who works for Aoni Production.

== Filmography ==
=== Anime ===
- Ducklings (The Wolf and the Fox), Child A (The Coat of Many Colours), Lumberjack's Son (The Spirit in the Bottle), Child B (The Hare and the Hedgehog), Wren Prince C (The Wren and the Bear), Hunter (young, The Water Nixie) in Grimm's Fairy Tale Classics (1987–1989)
- Kanta Hanamura in Sally the Witch (1989–1992)
- Nene-chan's Mom in Crayon Shin-chan (1992-present)
- Noriko Ikawa in Tsuyoshi Shikkari Shinasai (1992–1994)
- Cookie in Kishin Corps (1993–1994)
- Natsuko Tanaka in Aoki Densetsu Shoot (1993–1994)
- Girl at Party in Fatal Fury: The Motion Picture (1994)
- VesVes in Sailor Moon SuperS (1995–1996)
- Higuma-san in Bonobono (1995–1996)
- Misaki Sakura in Hanasaka Tenshi Ten-Ten-kun (1998–1999)
- Lu and Su in Blue Gender (1999–2000)

=== Video Games ===
- Sora no Erina in Galaxy Fraulein Yuna (1992)
- Rea in Ys IV: The Dawn of Ys (1993)
- Marc Brown and a Stewardess in Policenauts (1994)
- Nall in Lunar: Silver Star Story (1996)
- Saki in Grandia (1997)
- Freya in Magna Carta (2001)
