= Utacchi =

2010 video game

- Developer: Konami
- Publisher: Konami
- Director: Yuuta Watabe
- Producer: Yoshihiko Ota
- Composers: Daisuke Kurosawa, Osamu Migitera
- Series: Pop'n Music
- Platform: Nintendo DS
- Release: JP: February 25, 2010
- Genre: Music rhythm game
- Modes: Single player, multiplayer

Utacchi (うたっち) is a music video game developed and published by Konami for the Nintendo DS in 2010. It was released exclusively in Japan under the Pop'n Music series. The game plays with the system held in "book style" as the player interacts with falling notes using the stylus. The name 'Utacchi' is a portmanteau of the Japanese words "uta", meaning 'song', and "tacchi", a loan word from English meaning 'touch'.

== Gameplay ==
Utacchi plays like other Bemani games, where notes travel down lanes into a judgement area. When the note reaches the center of the judgement area, one of four actions must be taken based on the note's color:

Note Color	Note Description
Red	The note is tapped.
Yellow	The note is tapped immediately followed by an upwards flick.
Blue	The note is held for its duration.
Green	The note is held and the stylus is rubbed vertically for its duration.

To pass a song, the player must finish with at least 2/3 of the life bar full. As in other rhythm games, this is raised by hitting notes in time with the music. There are three timing grades: Good, Okay, and Boo. The first two will raise your life bar, while the last will deplete it.

=== Difficulty ===
The number of lanes possible are 1, 3, and 5. On 1 and 3 lane mode, there are two sub-difficulties, Simple and Difficult. 5 lane mode can only be played on Difficult.

=== Game Modes ===
Normal Play uses the gameplay listed above. Each note is part of the vocal track.

Vocal Play uses the same game play as above but player recorded audio replaces the vocal track. It is pitch shifted to match the song.

Karaoke uses the microphone to detect when the player is singing. "Konami Brings Bemani To The DS With Utacchi!!". Siliconera. 5 May 2010. Judging is based on the presence of sound, not on pitch. Karaoke uses the 5 lane notechart.

== Track listing ==
The following songs are unlocked at the beginning of the game:

Song	Artist	TV Show/Game
Genesis of Aquarion (創聖のアクエリオン, Sōsei no Akuerion)	Akino	Genesis of Aquarion
Dreamin'		
Anpanman March (アンパンマンのマーチ, Anpanman no Machi)		Anpanman
Cloudy Skies (曇天, Donten)	DOES	Gintama
My First Kiss (はじめてのチュウ, Hajimete no Chū)	Anshin Papa	Kiteretsu Daihyakka
Locolotion (ロコローション, Rokorōshon)	ORANGE RANGE	
A Cruel Angel's Thesis (残酷な天使のテーゼ, Zankoku na Tenshi no Tēze)	Yoko Takahashi	Neon Genesis Evangelion
Dancing Pompokolin (踊るポンポコリン, Odoru Ponpokolin)	B.B.Queens	Chibi Maruko-chan
Blue Bird (ブルーバード, Burūbādo)	Ikimonogakari	Naruto Shippuden
Sky-Blue Days (空色デイズ, Sorairo Deizu)	Shoko Nakagawa	Tengen Toppa Gurren Lagann

== Multiplayer ==
Up to 4 people can play together using link play or download play.
