= Tsuyoshi Shikkari Shinasai: Taisen Puzzle-dama =

1994 video game

- Cover art
- Developer: Konami
- Publisher: Konami
- Composers: Kenichi Matsubara; Hideto Inoue; Masahiro Ikariko; Harumi Ueko; Kazuhiko Uehara
- Series: Taisen Puzzle-Dama
- Platform: Super Famicom
- Release: JP: November 18, 1994
- Genre: Puzzle
- Modes: Single-player, multiplayer

Tsuyoshi Shikkari Shinasai: Taisen Puzzle-dama (Japanese: ツヨシしっかりしなさい 対戦ぱずるだま, Hepburn: Tsuyoshi Shikkari Shinasai: Taisen Pazurudama) is a 1994 puzzle video game developed and published by Konami. It is part of the Taisen Puzzle-dama series, and is based on the anime series Tsuyoshi Shikkari Shinasai. It was released exclusively in Japan for the Super Famicom in November 18, 1994.
