= List of castles in Ethiopia =

This is a list of castles in Ethiopia that are still standing.

== Addis Ababa ==
Name	Amharic name	Location	Date	Picture
Guenete Leul Palace	ገነተ ልዑል	Addis Ababa	20th century	
Menelik Palace	የምኒልክ ግቢ	Addis Ababa	19th century	
National Palace		Addis Ababa	20th century	

== Amhara ==
Name	Amharic name	Location	Date	Picture
Danqaz Palace	የዳንቃዝ ቤተ መንግስት	Danqaz	17th century	
Fasil Ghebbi	ፋሲል ግቢ	Gondar	17th century	
Guzara Castle	የጉዛራ ቤተ መንግስት	Emfraz	16th century	
Ras Mikael Sehul's Castle	የራስ ሚካኤል ስሁል ቤተ መንግሥት	Gondar	18th century	

== Tigray ==
Name	Tigrinys name	Location	Date	Picture
Yohannes IV Palace	ቤተ መንግስቲ ሃፀ ዮሃንስ ፬ይ	Mekelle	19th century	
Abreha Castle	ቤተ መንግስቲ አብርሃ አርአያ	Mekelle	20th century	

== Fortified town ==
Name	Amharic name	Location	Date	Picture
Harar	ሐረር	Harari Region	13th to 16th centuries	

== See also ==
- List of castles
