= Castlevania: Symphony of the Night =

1997 video game

- European box art by Ayami Kojima, featuring protagonist Alucard
- Developer: Konami Computer Entertainment Tokyo
- Publisher: Konami
- Director: Toru Hagihara
- Producer: Toru Hagihara
- Programmers: Toru Hagihara; Koji Igarashi; Kousuke Iwakura
- Artists: Ayami Kojima; Nobuya Nakazato
- Writers: Koji Igarashi; Toshiharu Furukawa
- Composer: Michiru Yamane
- Series: Castlevania
- Platforms: PlayStation, Sega Saturn, Xbox 360
- Release: March 20, 1997: PlayStation; JP: March 20, 1997; NA: October 3, 1997; PAL: November 1, 1997 Saturn; JP: June 25, 1998 Xbox 360; NA: March 21, 2007; EU: March 21, 2007; JP: July 25, 2007
- Genres: Action role-playing, Metroidvania
- Mode: Single-player

Castlevania: Symphony of the Night (Note: Known in Japan as Akumajō Dracula X: Gekka no Yasōkyoku (悪魔城ドラキュラX 月下の夜想曲, Akumajō Dorakyura Ekkusu: Gekka no Yasōkyoku; Demon Castle Dracula X: Nocturne in the Moonlight).) is a 1997 action role-playing game developed and published by Konami for the PlayStation and Sega Saturn. It is a direct sequel to Castlevania: Rondo of Blood, set five years after its events. It was directed and produced by Toru Hagihara, with Koji Igarashi acting as assistant director.

It features Dracula's dhampir son Alucard (returning from Castlevania III: Dracula's Curse) as the protagonist, as he explores Dracula's castle (which reemerges following the disappearance of Richter Belmont) and fights to prevent his father from fully regaining his lost power. Its design marks a break from previous entries in the series, re-introducing the exploration, nonlinear level design, and role-playing elements first experimented with in Castlevania II: Simon's Quest.

Symphony of the Night initially sold poorly. However, it gradually gained sales through word-of-mouth and became a sleeper hit, developing a cult following and selling over 700,000 units in the United States and Japan. The game garnered acclaim, often cited by critics as one of the best video games of all time, praising its gameplay innovations, atmosphere, visuals and soundtrack with criticism directed towards the voice acting. It is also considered the definitive pioneer of the Metroidvania genre, combining the two games and inspiring numerous exploration-based action-adventure games ever since. Symphony of the Night would have a lasting impact on the Castlevania series, with numerous mainline entries adopting its gameplay model.

== Gameplay ==
The player, as Alucard, explores Dracula's castle – a large, interconnected area – and fights enemies on his way.

Symphony of the Night features 2D side-scrolling gameplay. The game takes place in Dracula's castle, a large, interconnected area that the player explores as Alucard while fighting enemies. The castle is largely explored through non-linear gameplay, with most areas inaccessible until the player acquires various items and abilities. These include the ability to transform into a bat, wolf, or mist, allowing Alucard to reach previously inaccessible areas. As the player explores and uncovers more of the castle, an in-game map is updated to display their progress.

The game incorporates elements found in role-playing video games. Defeating monsters provides Alucard with experience points. Upon accumulating a predetermined amount, he will level up, increasing his attributes in the process. In addition to gaining levels, Alucard can find Life Vessels and Heart Vessels scattered throughout the castle, which permanently increase his maximum hit points and hearts, respectively. Alucard's hit points determine the maximum amount of damage he can withstand before dying, while his magic points determine how frequently he can use magical attacks. He has four other attributes: strength, which determines the power of his physical attacks; constitution, which affects his resistance to damage from enemies; intelligence, which determines the power of magical attacks and sub-weapons; and luck, which affects the frequency of item drops from enemies and the chance of scoring a critical hit.

Unlike previous Castlevania games, in which the player character typically used a whip, Alucard can find and use a wide variety of weapons throughout the castle which are stored in the player's inventory. Sub-weapons, a feature carried over from previous games, are used by collecting hearts dropped by candles and enemies. Alucard can also cast eight different spells by inputting directional combinations, with each spell consuming a varying amount of magic points. During the course of the game, he can acquire the ability to summon familiars, which aid him in combat and exploration.

Symphony of the Night has various endings. The player must acquire the item known as the Holy Glasses during gameplay and use it while fighting Richter to unlock the second segment of the game, the Inverted Castle. The Inverted Castle is an upside-down version of Dracula's castle containing new enemies and bosses. Defeating five specific bosses allows the player to collect Dracula's five body parts, which eventually leads to the final confrontation with him.

Alternative gameplay modes can be unlocked after completing the game. By entering 'Richter' in the name entry screen, the player can play as Richter Belmont, who uses a whip as his main weapon, along with various sub-weapons. In the Sega Saturn version and the ports included in the PlayStation Portable game Castlevania: The Dracula X Chronicles and the PlayStation 4 compilation Castlevania Requiem, Maria Renard is also playable.

== Plot ==
Castlevania: Symphony of the Night begins during Richter Belmont's confrontation and defeat of Count Dracula in 1792. (Note: As depicted in Castlevania: Rondo of Blood (1993)) The story then moves forward to 1797, by which time Richter has been missing for one year and Dracula's castle has reappeared. Dracula's son Alucard, who has been in a self-imposed slumber since helping Trevor Belmont defeat his father 300 years prior, (Note: As depicted in Castlevania III: Dracula's Curse (1989)) awakens and journeys to the castle to destroy it. He meets Maria Renard, who once fought alongside Richter and is searching for him. Alucard locates Richter, who claims to be the new lord of the castle. Convinced that Richter is under somebody else's control, Maria urges Alucard not to hurt him and gives him the Holy Glasses, which allows him to see past illusions. In the castle's keep, Alucard confronts Richter and learns that he plans to resurrect Dracula, so the two can fight for an eternity. During a fight, Alucard breaks the spell controlling Richter, and Dracula's servant Shaft appears and tells them that Dracula will still be resurrected soon.

Alucard leaves Richter and Maria to confront Shaft, venturing into an upside-down duplicate of the castle to seek him out. Shaft reveals he planned to end the threat of the Belmont clan by controlling one of them and forcing the clan to fight one another. After defeating Shaft, Alucard faces his father, who vows to bring an end to humankind because Alucard's mother Lisa was executed as a witch. Alucard refuses to join his father in his revenge, and he defeats him. Alucard tells Dracula that he has been thwarted many times because he lost the ability to love after Lisa's death, and that Lisa's final words were of eternal love for him and a plea not to hate or at least harm humanity. Before Dracula dies, he asks for Lisa's forgiveness and bids his son farewell.

After escaping the collapsing castle, Alucard rejoins Maria and Richter. Maria is relieved that he escaped, while Richter blames himself as the reason for Alucard's fight with his father. Alucard tells Richter, "the only thing necessary for the triumph of evil is for good men to do nothing" (a quote attributed to Edmund Burke), and resolves to disappear from the world because of his cursed bloodline. Depending on how much of the castle the player has explored, Maria either chases Alucard in the hope of changing his mind, or resigns herself to Alucard's fate and leaves with Richter.

== Development ==
In 1994, development began on a Castlevania game for the 32X, retroactively known under the title Castlevania: The Bloodletting. A playable prototype was created, but Konami decided to refocus its efforts on the PlayStation, and the game was cancelled as a result. Changes were made to these initial ideas, and the project became Symphony of the Night.

The game was directed and produced by Toru Hagihara, who had directed the previous entry, Rondo of Blood. Igarashi had creative influence and was involved with the story-writing and programming. Part way through production, Hagihara was promoted to head of the division and asked Igarashi to finish the game as the assistant director. From the outset, the game was intended to represent a new direction for the franchise. According to Igarashi, Castlevania: Symphony of the Night began development as "something of a side story for the series, we were able to break a lot of Castlevania conventions and introduce a lot of new elements that we still use today". Their primary motivation for the abrupt design change was the sight of dozens of Castlevania games in bargain bins of Japanese video game stores; linear Castlevania games offered limited replay value after completion. A noted fan of 2D games, Igarashi was instrumental in refining the game's control scheme.

Igarashi felt that regular action games were too short, and he wanted to create a game that "could be enjoyed for a long time". Consequently, the development team abandoned the traditional stage-by-stage progression of the previous Castlevania games in favor of an open castle that the player could freely explore. Igarashi looked to Nintendo's The Legend of Zelda series, which involved much exploration and backtracking to extend the amount of gameplay, but by making it a side-scroller, it thus became similar to Metroid; Symphony of the Night was also directly influenced by Super Metroid. Igarashi was able to use the critical reaction from Castlevania II: Simon's Quest, which was more focused on exploration than action, to pitch Symphony of the Night to Konami. The development team used inspiration from The Legend of Zelda to make most of the castle areas initially inaccessible to the player. The player would gradually obtain items and abilities that progressively opened up the castle. Their idea was to reward exploration while retaining the hack-and-slash action of the previous games. Instead of the whip-wielding protagonists of the previous games, the team made Alucard the main character, due to concerns over the whip attack taking up too much of the screen and the desire to give the player more unique action moves, such as transformation abilities.

Role-playing mechanics were added because Igarashi felt the earlier Castlevania games were too challenging for average players. To change that, the team implemented a leveling-up system with experience points, which rewarded players with better attack and defense statistics as they beat enemies. This system, combined with a variety of items, armors, weapons and spells, allowed the exploration to become less difficult for unskilled players.

Symphony of the Night marked the debut of artist Ayami Kojima in the video game industry. She worked on the game as a character designer, conceptualizing the game's main and supporting cast. Her designs for the game are heavily influenced by bishōnen-style art. The game is presented using 2D visuals, mainly sprites animated over scrolling backgrounds. The PlayStation had no hardware for scrolling, which led to the developers using the same methods for displaying character sprites to display the backgrounds. Occasionally, the 3D capabilities of the PlayStation are utilized. The game contains opening and ending cinematics, which were created by another group at Konami. Igarashi and the development team were disappointed in the quality of the cinematics, which featured flat models lacking textures.

The Sega Saturn adaptation was being developed by Konami Computer Entertainment Nagoya by August 1997. In contemporary interviews, the developers explained that they intended to preserve the PlayStation version's fundamental gameplay while incorporating player feedback and additional content. They also acknowledged difficulties in reproducing certain visual effects from the PlayStation version on Saturn. Rather than describing the project as a direct or complete conversion, the team intended to introduce improvements and new features.

=== Audio ===
The music used in Castlevania: Symphony of the Night was composed by Michiru Yamane. The soundtrack contains elements from multiple musical genres, including classical, techno, gothic rock, new-age, jazz, and subgenres of metal, specifically elements of thrash metal. "I Am the Wind", a vocal ending theme written by Rika Muranaka and Tony Haynes, and performed by Cynthia Harrell, is played during the credits. A secret music track can only be heard by inserting the PlayStation disc into a CD player.

== Release ==
=== PlayStation and Saturn ===
Castlevania: Symphony of the Night was released in Japan on March 20, 1997, in North America on October 3, 1997, and in Europe in November 1997. The Japanese release was packaged with an art book containing a small manga based on the game and a soundtrack compiled from most of the previous Castlevania games.

The North American and European version's localization was handled by Jeremy Blaustein, although he was not present for the voice recording. Blaustein added the lines "What is a man? A miserable little pile of secrets", which were taken from the works of French novelist André Malraux. Other changes made in localization included AI improvements, the addition of a sound test, and the correction of a game-crashing bug found in the Japanese release. The game was low-balled as a prospect for release in the United States, given relatively little advertising, received limited funding for its North American production, and was initially not a major financial success. The game was re-released in Japan on the "PlayStation the Best" label on March 19, 1998, and in North America on "Greatest Hits" in 1998.

The Saturn conversion underwent several release-date revisions. A February 1998 preview in Sega Saturn Magazine listed an April release at ¥4,800, while a subsequent April preview announced May 21 at a reduced price of ¥3,800. By late May, the magazine reported that development was complete but acknowledged a further postponement, with the release date temporarily listed as undecided. The game was ultimately released in Japan on June 25, 1998.

I understand why fans who've never played the Saturn version would be interested in those features, but I really, really don't feel good about them. I couldn't put my name on that stuff and present it to Castlevania fans.

— Koji Igarashi, June 2007, on the Saturn port

In the Saturn version, Maria Renard is both a fully playable character as well as a boss fight, and Richter is available to play at the start of the game. When playing the game as Alucard, a "third hand" is available, but only for stat-altering items like food and potions and not weaponry. Alucard can use exclusive items, such as the Godspeed Boots, which grant him the ability to run like Richter. New areas, the Cursed Prison and the Underground Garden, which include new bosses, can be visited. The port also contains remixes of songs from previous Castlevania games. However, loading is more frequent and takes longer in the Saturn version than in other versions. Because the Saturn has limited hardware transparency support, transparency effects such as the mists and the waterfall were replaced with dithering effects, though partial translucency does exist in a few areas such as with Saturn exclusive enemies and one of the final boss fights. Rather than taking advantage of the Saturn's increased resolution, the graphics were stretched to fill the screen, causing some sprites to be distorted. The overall quality of the Saturn port's video is said, according to Igarashi, to be lower than the PlayStation version because it is a simple port handled by another team and was not programmed to take advantage of the Saturn's 2D capabilities. Igarashi overall expressed disappointment with the Saturn version.

By the time the Saturn version was released in Japan, it had already been confirmed that unlike the PlayStation version, it would not be released in the United States.

=== Re-releases ===
A port of the game was planned for release on the Game.com, but was cancelled during development. An in-progress prototype of the game was discovered and released onto the internet in 2022.

In 2006, Konami announced that the PlayStation version of the game would be ported to the Xbox 360, distributed via Xbox Live Arcade. The game was ported by Backbone Entertainment. It was the first Xbox Live Arcade title to exceed the 50 MB file size restriction for games on the service at the time. Xbox Live Arcade group manager Greg Canessa stated that an exception was made for Symphony of the Night to "ensure that the gameplay experience is the best it can be". This version was released on March 21, 2007. As with most Xbox Live Arcade games, Castlevania: Symphony of the Night features leaderboards that track players' progress through the castle and features 12 achievements worth 200 points. To save space, all full motion video sequences were removed from the North American and European versions of the game. They have since been returned to the Japanese version, which is approximately 25 megabytes larger. While the unpatched version on Xbox Live Arcade still featured "I Am the Wind" as the game's closing music, a later patch replaced it with "Admiration Towards the Clan", the closing song in Castlevania: Lament of Innocence due to licensing reasons. This patch also fixed a distorted background image in one ending. In 2009, Konami released Castlevania: Symphony of the Night alongside Super Contra and Frogger on the Konami Classics Vol. 1 compilation for Xbox 360.

Symphony of the Night was re-released as a "PSone Classics" title on the PlayStation Network store on July 19, 2007, in North America, on December 16, 2010, in Japan, and on December 12, 2012, in Europe for use with the PlayStation 3, the PlayStation Portable, and the PlayStation Vita.

A port of Symphony of the Night was included as unlockable bonus content in Castlevania: The Dracula X Chronicles for the PlayStation Portable, which was released in North America on October 23, 2007, in Japan on November 8, 2007, and in Europe on February 18, 2008. Except for the Japanese release, the English translation features a new script and newly recorded voice acting, with the option to use the original Japanese voices. The PSP release is a port of the PlayStation version, but contains some additions and changes. Maria Renard is a playable character and a boss in this version, sporting a new moveset modeled after her abilities in Rondo of Blood. Like the Xbox 360 version, "I Am the Wind" was replaced with "Mournful Serenade", a new piece composed by Michiru Yamane, as the closing theme. An English-recorded version of the song "Nocturne" was added along with several familiars, both of which had been removed in previous international releases of the game. The Dracula X Chronicles versions of Symphony of the Night and Rondo of Blood were re-released for the PlayStation 4 on October 26, 2018 as part of the Castlevania Requiem compilation. Android and iOS ports of the game were released on March 4, 2020, based on the Dracula X Chronicles version.

In 2010, Castlevania Puzzle: Encore of the Night, a puzzle game based on Symphony of the Night, was released for iOS.

== Reception ==
Reception

Aggregate scores
Aggregator	Score
Metacritic	93/100 (PS); 89/100 (X360); 88/100 (iOS)
OpenCritic	49% recommend(As part of Castlevania Requiem) (Note: Based on 45 reviews.)

Review scores
Publication	Score
1Up.com	A (PS)
Computer and Video Games	5/5 (PS)
Edge	8/10 (PS)
Electronic Gaming Monthly	9.25/10 (PS)
Eurogamer	9/10 (X360)
Famitsu	7/10, 8/10, 8/10, 7/10 (PS); 32/40 (SS)
Game Informer	9.5/10 (PS)
GameFan	294/300 (PS)
GameRevolution	B+ (PS)
GameSpot	8.9/10 (PS); 8.5/10 (X360)
Hyper	82% (PS)
IGN	9/10 (PS, X360)
Next Generation	4/5 (PS)
PlayStation Official Magazine – UK	7/10 (PS)
Official U.S. PlayStation Magazine	5/5 (PS)
Official Xbox Magazine (UK)	9/10 (X360)
TouchArcade	4.5/5 (iOS)
Dengeki PlayStation	80/100, 90/100, 85/100, 70/100

Castlevania: Symphony of the Night received wide critical acclaim at the time of its release. Critics lauded the massive, free-to-explore game world with its numerous secrets to uncover, and praised the game for integrating role-playing elements without compromising the series' basic gameplay. Multiple critics also made mention of the ingeniously designed enemies and the story's many plot twists. GameSpot hailed it as "easily one of the best games ever released and a true testament to the fact that 2D gaming is not dead by any stretch of the imagination." Computer and Video Games commented, "This may be old-skool style, but it feels like the freshest thing of the year." Next Generation stated that "Symphony of the Night has classic written all over it" and called it "spectacular" for a 2D side-scrolling platformer in the age of 32- and 64-bit games. GamePro gave it a perfect 5.0 out of 5 in all four categories (graphics, sound, control, and fun factor), calling it "one of the best games of the year."

Despite the popular consensus of the time that 2D had become outmoded, critics also highly praised the game's graphics for their smooth animation, impressive effects, and evocation of atmosphere. John Ricciardi of Electronic Gaming Monthly wrote that "everything is animated with an amazing attention to detail, and the special effects used throughout provide an atmosphere that just begs to be experienced." However, there were a few detractors of the use of 2D. Entertainment Weekly said that the visuals were dated and flat, when compared to Nightmare Creatures which featured 3D environments, while IGN commented, "The graphics are initially similar-looking to SNES and Genesis incarnations of the game, the character animation isn't particularly smooth and 3D is resigned to limited background effects and the odd special effect." A few criticized the voice acting, though GameSpot instead praised it. The music was met with almost unanimous approval, IGN describing it as "sometimes daunting, sometimes rousing and always doing what music should—enhancing the action."

In Electronic Gaming Monthly's Editors' Choice Awards, Castlevania: Symphony of the Night was awarded "PlayStation Game of the Year" and "Side-Scrolling Game of the Year", and was a runner-up for "Best Music" (behind PaRappa the Rapper) and "Game of the Year" (behind GoldenEye 007). It also was named "Best Sequel" in their annual Buyer's Guide. It was named "Game of the Year" by PSM in its list of the top ten games of 1997.

Castlevania: Symphony of the Night received nominations for "Console Game of the Year" and "Console Adventure Game of the Year" at the AIAS' inaugural Interactive Achievement Awards.

The game has developed a large cult following and copies of the original PlayStation version are considered collector's items. It demonstrated the continued popularity of 2D games during the fifth generation of video game consoles in the 32-bit era, which saw rapid advancements in 3D gaming.

The game has continued to receive critical acclaim, and it has appeared on several other "greatest game" lists. The same year it was released, it was ranked the 12th best console video game of all time by Electronic Gaming Monthly, which said it "is not only the best 2-D game on the PlayStation, it's one of the best, period." It appeared on GameSpot's "The Greatest Games of All Time" list. It was placed 16th on IGN's "Top 100 Games of All Time" and 24th in Game Informer's "Top 200 Video Games Ever", down six places from its 2001 ranking. GameZone ranked it the best Castlevania title ever made. GamePro listed the discovery of the inverted castle as the 26th-greatest moment in gaming. GamesRadar named Castlevania: Symphony of the Night the second-best PlayStation game of all time, behind Metal Gear Solid. It was ranked 4th place on EGM's list of 100 greatest games of all time, and was the highest PS1 game on the list. Edge ranked the game No. 35 on its list of "The 100 Best Games To Play Today", stating "When you get to that moment when the castle turns on its head, you see that it's a work of genius".

The gameplay of Castlevania: Symphony of the Night and its 2D successors is often compared in the gaming press with the popular series Metroid, with both Castlevania: Symphony of the Night and Super Metroid seen as pioneers in the genre, leading to the coinage of the term "Metroidvania" (a portmanteau of Metroid and Castlevania), used to describe video games that share some of their elements.

=== Sales ===
Initially, the game's commercial performance was mediocre, particularly in the United States where it was meagerly publicized, but thanks to praise by critics, it gained sales through word-of-mouth and became a hit. The PlayStation and Saturn versions sold 225,862 units in Japan, while the PlayStation version sold 477,304 units in the United States, for a total of 703,166 units sold in the United States and Japan.
