= Pop'n Music =

1998 rhythm game series

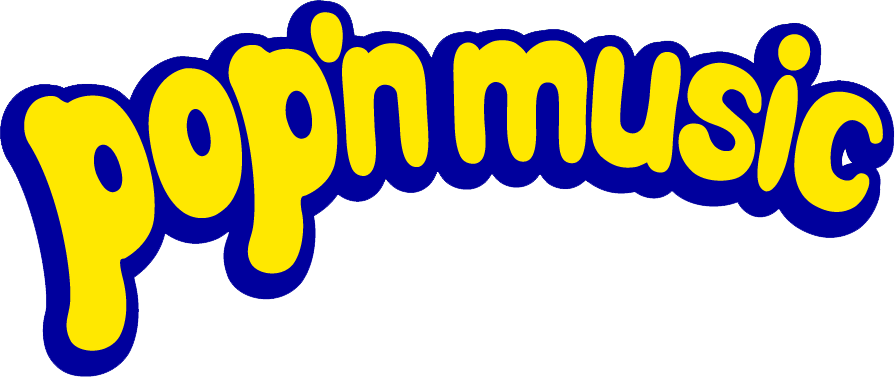
- Logo
- Genres: Music, rhythm
- Developer: Bemani
- Publisher: Konami
- Platforms: Arcade, Dreamcast, Game Boy Color, PlayStation, PlayStation 2, PlayStation Portable, Wii
- First release: Pop'n Music; September 28, 1998
- Latest release: Pop'n Music High☆Cheers!! December 18, 2025
- Spin-offs: Utacchi, Beat'n Groovy

Pop'n Music, (Note: Japanese: ポップンミュージック, Hepburn: Poppun Myūjikku) stylized in all lowercase, is a music video game series developed by Konami's Bemani division. The first entry in the series was released in 1998 as an arcade game in Japan. Several more entries have been released to date for arcade machines and other video game consoles. The series' recurring elements include a colorful nine-button controller, a variety of musical genres, and characters drawn in a cartoon-like style.

The main entries in the series are rhythm games in which players press buttons in time with music. Each press corresponds to a colored object that falls from the top of the screen. Players are represented by avatars and have access to singleplayer and multiplayer game modes. The series has spawned a number of music game spin-offs, including releases in South Korea and the United States.

The original Pop'n Music was Konami's second major music game, following Beatmania. While Beatmania targeted listeners of club music, Konami sought to capture a broader audience with Pop'n Music by incorporating a larger range of genres. The series went on to adopt a business model of regular content updates and character-centered merchandise. Each game features music written for the series by in-house sound directors and guest composers; many soundtracks also incorporate songs from other Bemani games and pop culture. The series as a whole has been praised by critics for its gameplay, difficulty, and musical identity.

== Common elements ==
=== Gameplay ===
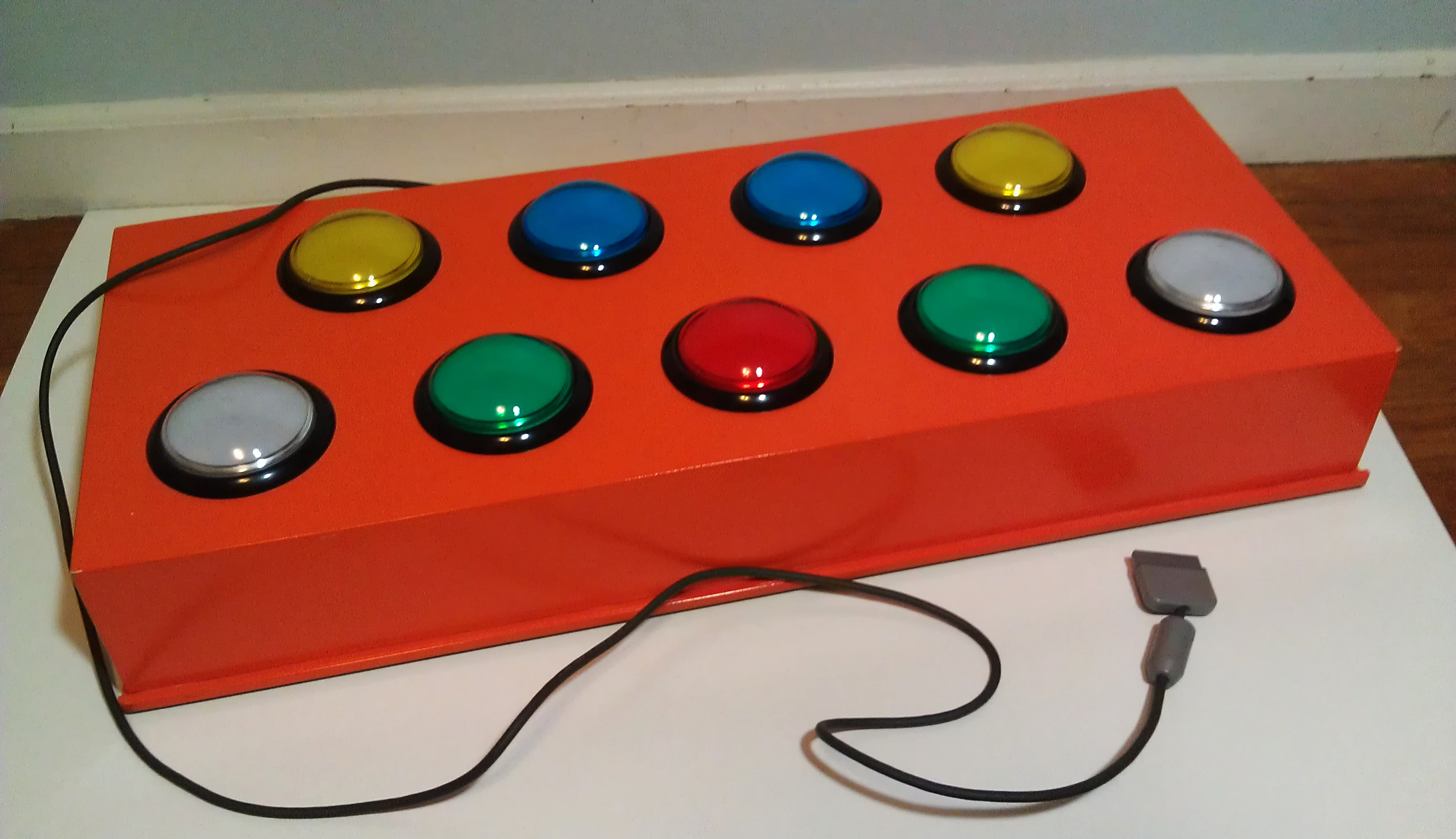
Photograph of a homemade Pop'n Music controller

Composed of nine colorful buttons, the Pop'n Music interface is not designed to represent any actual musical instrument. Instead, buttons trigger various musical sounds within a pre-recorded song. Players press the buttons in time with in-game objects that fall in nine columns from the top of the screen; once the objects reach the line at the bottom of the screen, players press the button that corresponds to the object's column. These objects are referred to as Pop-kun (ポップ君).

At the start of each session, players choose a character that represents them while playing. The primary objective of Pop'n Music is to achieve a high score; scores increase when players press the correct buttons in time with a song. This is visualized through an on-screen display called the Groove Gauge, which fills up as players increase their score. Players can successfully complete a song by filling the Groove Gauge to a certain point. There are also optional gameplay settings such as Hidden and Sudden, which obscure the top and bottom of the screen, respectively. In an analysis of rhythm games for the Chopin Review, Tim Summer compared Pop'n Music's musical interface to the piano and noted that advanced players accounted for rubato and hand crossing while performing Chopin songs that were adapted into the series.

==== Modes ====
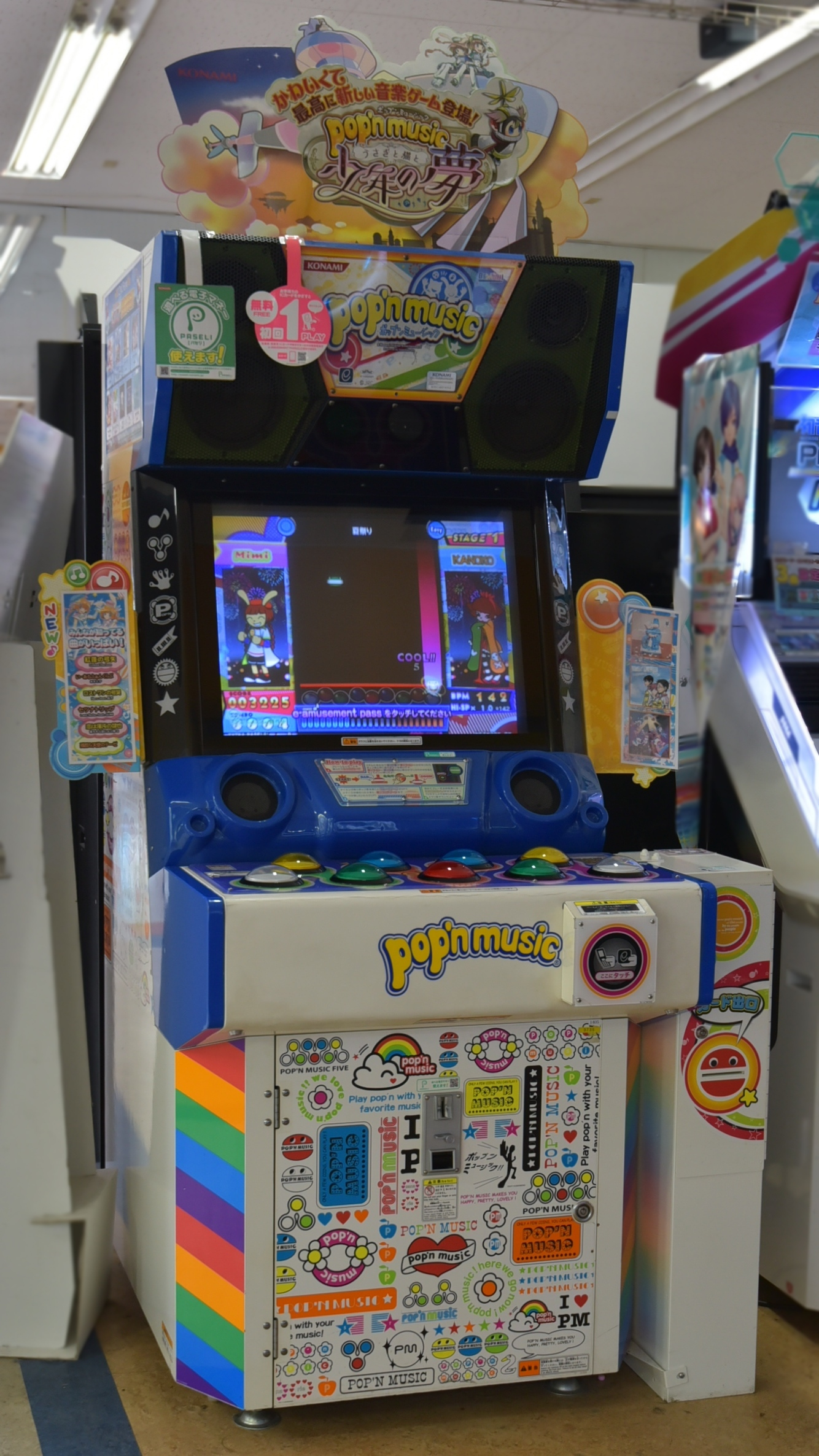
Pop'n Music うさぎと猫と少年の夢 arcade machine

The Pop'n Music arcade series includes a number of gameplay modes. From Pop'n Music 20 Fantasia onward, the previous Challenge, Super (超, Chō)-Challenge, and Net Battle (対戦, taisen) Modes were consolidated into a single Normal Mode. Challenge Mode was introduced in Pop'n Music 5. It included a full roster of songs and options to increase the game's difficulty through a set modifiers. Up to two modifiers could be selected for any given song. These score-increasing modifiers were called Norma (ノルマ) and Ojama (オジャマ); Norma set point quotas to reach for a certain song, while Ojama were periodic obstacles that disrupted gameplay. Super-Challenge Mode, which incorporated the "Cool" accuracy score, and Net Battle Mode, which matched players in online competitions, were introduced in Pop'n Music 12 Iroha (いろは).

Pop'n Music 6 introduced Battle Mode and Expert Mode. Battle mode involves two players competing for the higher score on the same song. Each player controls three buttons to play the song's notes and a fourth blue button that can disrupt their opponent's play. After being prompted to do so, players press the blue button to activate a minigame along the bottom of the screen. When one of the players loses the minigame, they are inflicted with a penalty. In Expert Mode, players aimed to complete pre-made courses of four songs; missed notes lowered the Groove Gauge, and the game would end if the Groove Gauge reached zero. The mode introduced the "Cool" accuracy score, which was higher than the previous highest accuracy of "Great". Expert Mode also included an online ranking system, in which players with high scores would appear on a publicly visible leaderboard.

Introduced in Pop'n Music 12 Iroha (いろは), Enjoy Mode contained a selection of beginner-friendly songs that could be either played with five buttons or all nine buttons. It was renamed Easy Mode in Pop'n Music 20 Fantasia.

Recommendation (オススメ, Osusume) Mode was introduced in Pop'n Music 9; players who selected the mode were asked a series of questions by the game and played a song that was selected according to their answers. The difficulty of each song was also adjusted according to the players' skill.

=== Characters ===
The series features many characters drawn in a cartoon style, who act as player avatars and represent different songs in the series. Many characters are references to musical artists, such as Elvis Presley, Kraftwerk and Jamiroquai. Others allude to literary figures such as William Blake and Kenji Miyazawa. The two main characters of the series are Mimi, an anthropomorphic rabbit, and Nyami, an anthropomorphic cat. They appear on title screens and present the game's tutorial in Pop'n Music Sunny Park and Pop'n Music Éclale.

== Media ==
=== Arcade versions ===
==== Main series ====
Main series release timeline Hardware changes in bold
1998	Pop'n Music
1999	Pop'n Music 2
1999	Pop'n Music 3
2000	**Pop'n Music 4**
2000	Pop'n Music 5
2001	Pop'n Music 6
2001	Pop'n Music 7
2002	Pop'n Music 8
2002	**Pop'n Music 9**
2003	Pop'n Music 10
2004	Pop'n Music 11
2004	Pop'n Music 12 Iroha (いろは)
2005	Pop'n Music 13 Carnival (カーニバル)
2006	Pop'n Music 14 Fever!
2007	**Pop'n Music 15 Adventure**
2008	Pop'n Music 16 Party♪
2009	Pop'n Music 17 The Movie
2010	Pop'n Music 18 Sengoku Retsuden
2010	(せんごく列伝)
2010	**Pop'n Music 19 Tune Street**
2011	Pop'n Music 20 Fantasia
2012	Pop'n Music Sunny Park
2013
2014	Pop'n Music Lapistoria (ラピストリア)
2015	Pop'n Music Éclale
2016	Pop'n Music Usagi to Neko to Shōnen no Yume
2016	(うさぎと猫と少年の夢)
2017
2018	Pop'n Music Peace
2019
2020	Pop'n Music Kaimei Riddles (解明リドルズ)
2021
2022	Pop'n Music UniLab
2023
2024	Pop'n Music Jam&Fizz
2025	**Pop'n Music High☆Cheers!!**

The first installment of Pop'n Music was released in Japan by Konami on September 28, 1998. It featured difficulty-raising obstacles named Ojama (オジャマ). Pop'n Music was the second game developed by Konami's Bemani division and used the same arcade circuit board as its predecessor, Beatmania. Pop'n Music 2 was released in March 1999, and introduced gameplay modifiers such as Hidden, Random, and Mirror. The final installment that used the original circuit board, Pop'n Music 3, was released in September 1999 and provided the first instance of a combo tally in the series.

The arcade series received a change in hardware in March 2000 with the release of Pop'n Music 4. Using the Firebeat circuit board, it introduced speed modifiers as a difficulty setting. Pop'n Music 5 was released in November 2003; it was the first game in the arcade series to include 5-line mode, in which players only needed to press the center five buttons. Pop'n Music 6 was released in April 2001 and introduced Battle Mode, in which two players controlled three buttons each. After the release of Pop'n Music 7 in November 2001, the series held its first in-game event, named Bingo de 7.

The second change in circuit boards came with Pop'n Music 9, which released in December 2002 and allowed the saving of play data through the e-Amusement system. Pop'n Music 12 Iroha (いろは) was released in December 2004; it introduced Net Battle (対戦, taisen) Mode, in which players could compete online in real time. Released in 2005, Pop'n Music 13 Carnival (カーニバル) included Super Challenge Mode, which used "Cool" as an accuracy score.

Pop'n Music 15 Adventure was released in 2007 with the series' fourth circuit board and antialiasing for its graphics. The song Rin to Shite Saku Hana no Gotoku (凛として咲く花の如く) was written for Adventure and was covered by Tricot in 2012. In December 2010, the series began to use LCD screens for its arcade cabinets instead of CRT displays with the release of Pop'n Music 19 Tune Street. Pop'n Music 20 Fantasia was released in 2011 and merged the previous Challenge, Super Challenge, and Net Battle modes into Normal Mode.

Pop'n Music Lapistoria (ラピストリア), released in 2014, utilized a different art style from the rest of the series and was the first installment to include a story mode. Long Pop-kun, notes that were played by holding the buttons down, were introduced with the release of Pop'n Music Usagi to Neko to Shōnen no Yume (うさぎと猫と少年の夢) in 2016. Pop'n Music UniLab was released in 2022, with the "Lift" option for players to raise or lower the judgement line's position on the screen. Players could also adjust game settings on a per-song basis after the release of Pop'n Music Jam&Fizz in 2024. In 2025, Pop'n Music High☆Cheers!! was released in Japan. It was installed on new cabinets (known as the Pikapika Pop-kun model) with touchscreens, higher refresh rates and two large Pop-kun buttons on each side of the control panels. It received an official North American release in 2026.

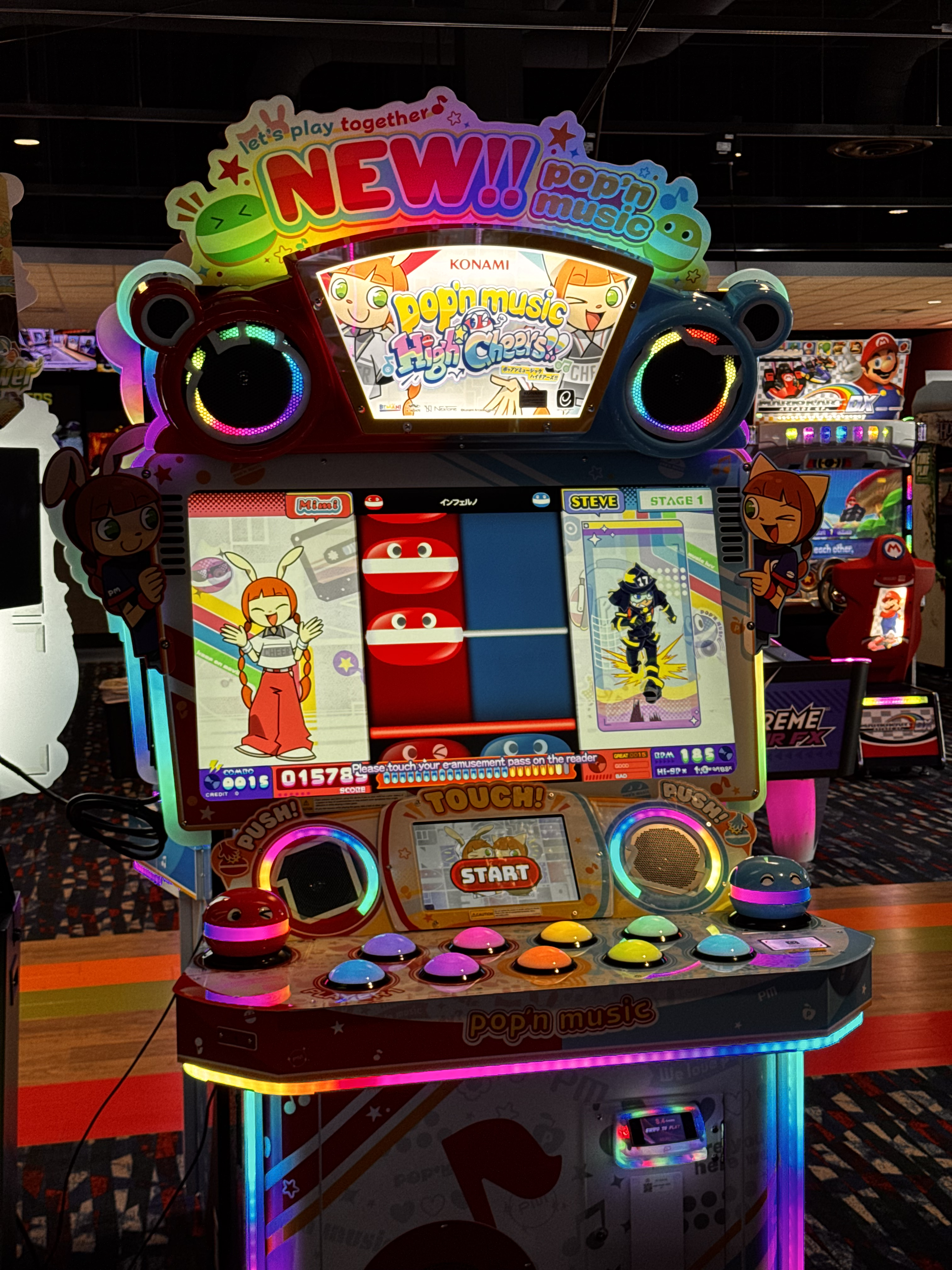
A Pikapika Pop-kun model cabinet running Pop'n Music High☆Cheers!!

==== Spin-offs ====
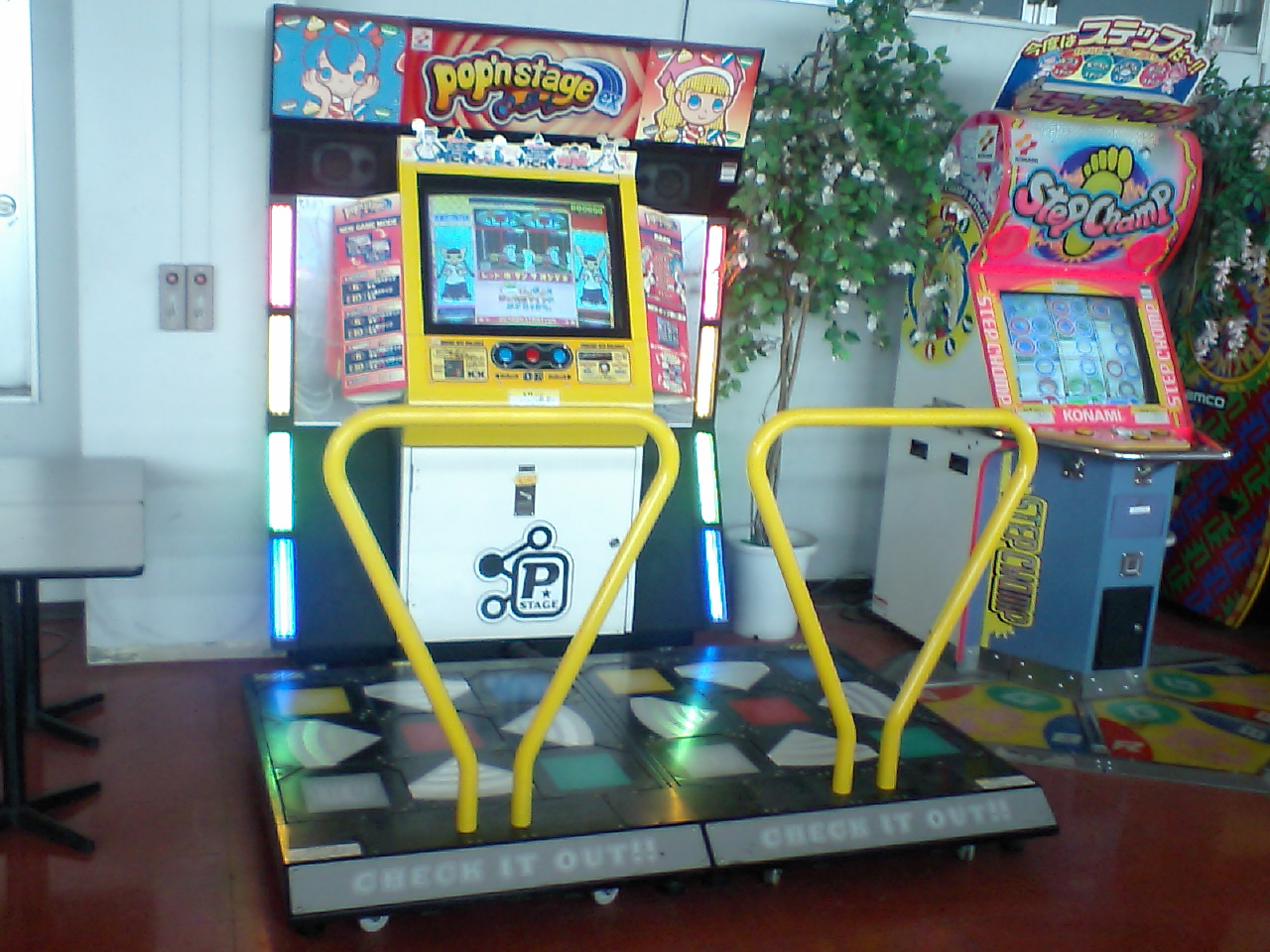
Arcade cabinet for the spin-off game Pop'n Stage

Several spinoff arcade games have been made from the Pop'n Music series, beginning with Pop'n Stage in September 1999. Similar to Dance Dance Revolution, Pop'n Stage is a dancing game that involves ten switches; players aim to step on switches that correspond with falling notes on the screen. As in Pop'n Music, each correct step activates musical sounds that harmonize with the song being played. Six switches are available in singleplayer mode, while multiplayer mode allows all ten switches. An update named Pop'n Stage EX was released in December 1999. It introduced the Maniac difficulty, which includes Ojama and singleplayer stages that involves all ten switches.

Pop'n Music Mickey Tunes was released in March 2000; it uses music and characters from Disney series and is the first Pop'n Music game to implement an online ranking system. It includes three modes: Magical, Normal, and Mania. Magical Mode includes a function that assists players after they hit certain notes, while Mania Mode was designed for advanced players. Pop'n Music Animelo, also released in March 2000, includes songs from anime and television shows. In September 2000, Pop'n Music Animelo 2 was released, with modes such as Gun Mode and Bowling Mode. The gameplay of Bowling Mode relies on depth perception; notes scroll towards players from a perceived distance instead of falling from the top of the screen. Animelo 2 also includes secret options that double or triple the number of notes in a song.

Hello! Pop'n Music, a spin-off game aimed towards beginners, was released in March 2011. It lowered the number of buttons from nine to four and included a system where players could unlock special events by repeatedly using the same character.

=== Consumer software ===
==== Main series ====
Consumer software release timeline
1999	Pop'n Music
1999	Pop'n Music 2
2000	Pop'n Music 3
2000	Pop'n Music 4
2001	Pop'n Music 5
2002	Pop'n Music 6
2002	Pop'n Music 7
2003	Pop'n Music 8
2004	Pop'n Music 9
2004	Pop'n Music 10
2005	Pop'n Music 11
2006	Pop'n Music 12 Iroha (いろは)
2006	Pop'n Music 13 Carnival (カーニバル)
2007	Pop'n Music 14 Fever!
2008–2009
2010	Pop'n Music Portable
2011	Pop'n Music Portable 2
2012–2019
2020	Pop'n Music Lively

Pop'n Music, released in 1999 for the PlayStation and the Dreamcast, is the series' first home console title. The game includes the console-exclusive Training Mode, and was released with a dedicated nine-button controller. The next three installments, up to Pop'n Music 4, were also released for both the PlayStation and the Dreamcast; Pop'n Music 3 and Pop'n Music 4 were released as expansion packs called Append Discs to the standalone Pop'n Music 2. The mobile mini-game Pop'n Music Anywhere for the VMU and the PocketStation was bundled with Pop'n Music 2. The home console editions of Pop'n Music 5 and Pop'n Music 6 were exclusive to the PlayStation. The remaining home console installments were released for the PlayStation 2, starting from 2002 with Pop'n Music 7 and ending in 2007 with Pop'n Music 14 Fever!. Two main series installments were released as handheld games on the PlayStation Portable; Pop'n Music 15 was released as Pop'n Music Portable in 2010 and Pop'n Music 16 was released as Pop'n Music Portable 2 in 2011.

In 2020, a computer port named Pop'n Music Lively was released under a monthly subscription model. The game is based on Pop'n Music Peace and can be played with a nine-button controller that was released by Konami in 2021.

==== Spin-offs ====
Pop'n Music has given rise to a number of handheld spin-offs. In 2000, Pop'n Music GB was released for the Game Boy Color with a five-button control scheme. Utacchi was released in 2010 for the Nintendo DS and includes a karaoke mode that uses the console's microphone. The mobile game Konami Pop'n Music was released in South Korea for phones on the SKT network in 2008; it was followed by Pop'n Music 2 Carnival in 2009. In 2011, Pop'n Music M was released in Japan for phones on the FOMA network and was followed by the iOS game Pop'n Rhythmin in 2013.

Spin-offs for home devices include Pop'n Music 打!!, a typing game released in 2000 for personal computers (PC). Pop'n Puzzle-dama Online, a Pop'n Music-themed installment of the Taisen Puzzle-dama series, was released for Windows in 2003 and the PS2 in 2004. In 2008, an English-localized spin-off titled Beat'n Groovy was released for the Xbox Live Arcade. The PC game Pop'n Music Be-Mouse was also released in 2008 and was bundled with a Pop'n-themed computer mouse. Pop'n Music for the Wii was released in Japan in 2009 and the United States in 2010.

== Development ==
=== Origin ===
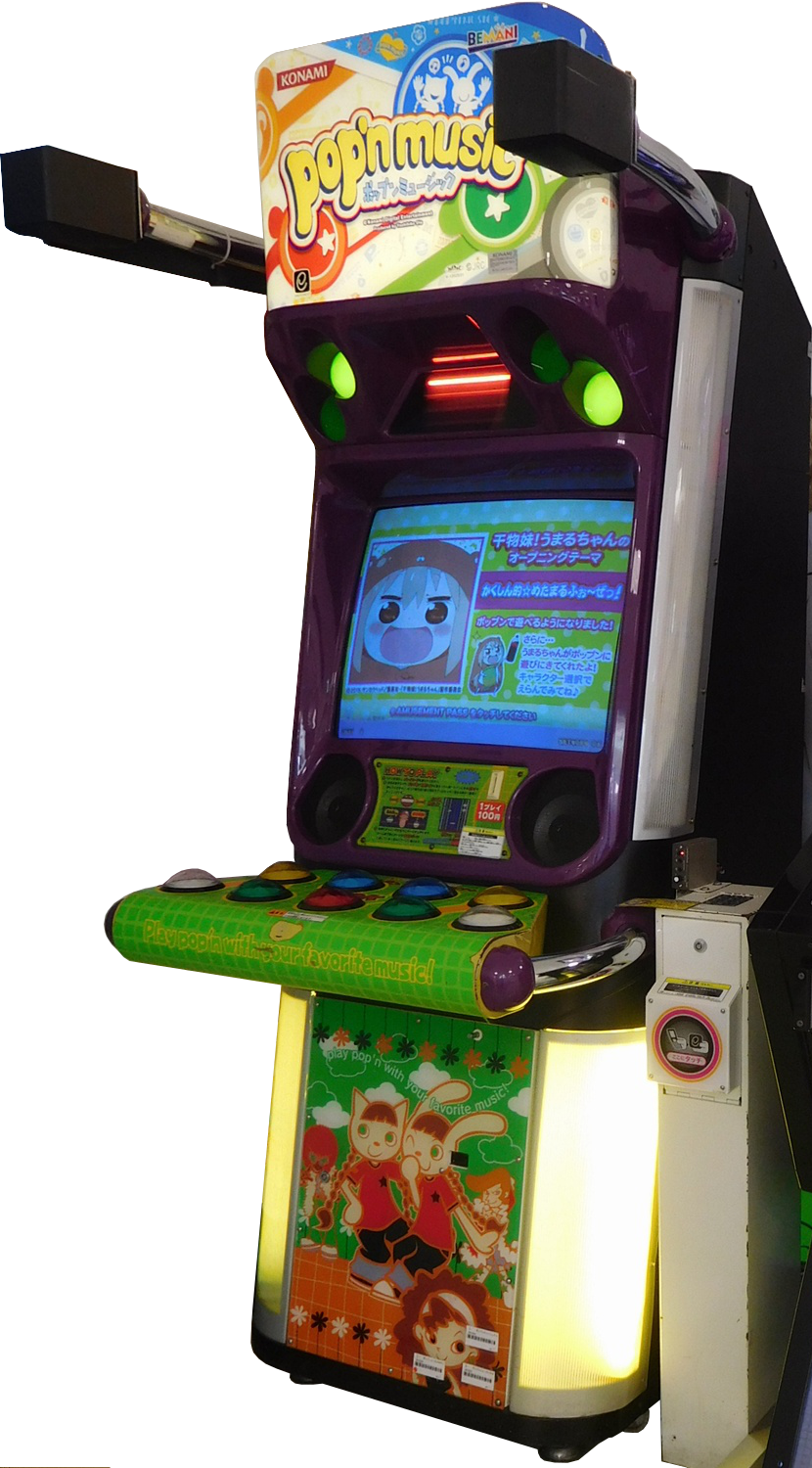
Pop'n Music éclale was installed to upgrade this Pop'n Music 8 arcade machine.

Pop'n Music was developed by Konami in 1998, a year after the success of Beatmania. Its name was coined by Beatmania's former producer, Reo Nagumo, who was inspired by the name of a radio program. Nagumo was originally part of Konami's merchandiser and medal game department; after he was brought on by the department's sound manager to work on Beatmania, the development team created Pop'n Music in parallel with sequels for Beatmania. Compared to Beatmania, which focused on club music, Pop'n Music was developed with a broader target audience in mind. As a result, the game employed musical genres such as enka, kayōkyoku, and jazz. An official mook published in 1999 stated that Pop'n Music cabinets were installed near photo booths and that high-school girls were the primary audience for the series.

Konami applied a similar business model for Beatmania to Pop'n Music by selling dedicated arcade cabinets for the series and providing upgrades in the form of software and circuit board hardware. The former editor-in-chief of Gamest attributed the longevity of Pop'n Music to the system of regular content updates that Konami had pursued from the 1990s. After submitting a patent application in 1999, Konami received a patent for the Ojama system in 2000. Merchandise for Pop'n Music appeared early in the series' history, such as a 2001 book on character designs titled Pop'n Music Character Visual Guide. This came after the establishment of Konami's Creative Products division in 1996, which was cited by Nikkei Business as marking a shift within Konami to market character-focused goods.

=== Visual design ===
The designer for the first Pop'n Music game was Shintaro Mukai, who received coloring assistance from Shio. Shio was in charge of design from Pop'n Music 2 onward and remained on the development team during Pop'n Music 20 Fantasia. In an interview for the Pop'n Music Character Visual Guide, Shio stated that she strove to keep designs simple while also making characters stand out from a distance in arcades. The series' visuals have influenced other Konami productions: designers for Pop'n Music contributed to the titular characters for the game Elebits, and former Konami producer Koji Igarashi included Mimi and Nyami as characters in the Japanese localization of Scribblenauts. In 2011, the series accepted fan-made designs for new characters through a campaign for Pop'n Music 20 Fantasia.

A major redesign was introduced with Pop'n Music Lapistoria; staff stated that the redesign was an attempt to modernize character designs and broaden the range of facial expressions to support the story. Designs that predated Lapistoria remained in the game as inhabitants of Pop'n World, while characters with the new design belonged to a new setting named Lapistoria. The series underwent a second redesign with Pop'n Music Peace, moving away from the bishōjo-like style of Lapistoria by adopting visuals that aligned closer to the original game.

=== Music ===
Songs written for Pop'n Music span a large variety of genres. Each song name is accompanied by a genre tag, which are rarely shared between songs. While many songs are categorized into existing musical genres, the series also employs idiosyncratic fictional genres in its naming system. Genre names were removed in 2014 with Pop'n Music Lapistoria and returned in 2025 with Pop'n Music High☆Cheers!!. The series is heavily influenced by the Shibuya-kei microgenre; notable musicians associated with the genre who have composed for Pop'n Music include Perfume's producer Yasutaka Nakata and members of Cymbals, Plus-Tech Squeeze Box and Round Table. From its first arcade title in 1998, Pop'n Music has also included songs from Beatmania. The development team, aiming for Pop'n Music to have delineated concept and target audience, was initially hesitant to reuse Beatmania songs. Ultimately, they included one song from Beatmania in the first Pop'n Music game as a hidden feature. Additional songs from spin-off games such as Pop'n Stage were also reused in later installments of Pop'n Music.

The series employs sound directors who compose new songs and lead the musical development of each game. Directors include Hiroshi Takeyasu, Kiyoshi Murai, Tomosuke Funaki, Wac, Des-Row, and Pon. The sound director for the first three installments, Takeyasu, noted a stronger J-pop influence in Pop'n Music 3 after Konami's record label began being involved in production. Guest directors have also composed for the series, such as Yoko Shimomura in Pop'n Music 13 Carnival and Yasunori Mitsuda in Pop'n Music 20 Fantasia. Each game's theme is also decided by sound directors; the fantasy theme of Fantasia was decided by Pon and Wac. The sound directors for Pop'n Music Lapistoria composed songs that matched a particular character's personality and background to fit the game's story-centered theme. In other Pop'n Music games, characters were created to fit a given song. Arcade circuit boards were upgraded in Pop'n Music 4, 9, and 15, which necessitated new technical specifications for songs from previous games. The development team considered the workload of Pop'n Music 9 to be particularly high, as it included all songs from previous installments and a change in audio coding formats.

== Reception ==
Pop'n Music has been positively received in Japan. The series reached number 8 in a public poll by Famitsu for the best music games of all time. Early in the series' history, Pop'n Music was number 6 in the magazine Game Machine's list of most popular arcade games in Japan. Several of the series' Dreamcast ports have also garnered a favorable response; the first port was the 78th best selling game of its console, and Pop'n Music 4 placed number 8 in a summary of reader polls held by Dreamcast Magazine for the best Dreamcast game.

Some reviewers have praised Pop'n Music for its gameplay; Shacknews and Impress Watch described it and "addictive" and "a game that anyone can causally play". The series has been evaluated on its difficulty levels; reviews for the Dreamcast and PlayStation 2 ports felt that the games were accessible with "simple rules" but challenging upper stages. Total Control considered the control scheme to be a "stripped down version" of Beatmania but added that players would be "worked up into a frenzy" on harder stages, while NGamer asserted that the series was a "'hardcore' favorite" and owed part of its appeal to its difficulty.

The series' nine-button controller is sold as a peripheral for consoles such as the PlayStation 2 and Dreamcast. Many critics have welcomed the peripheral's addition: Total Control's review of Pop'n Music for the Dreamcast and Dreamcast Magazine both argued that the game was more enjoyable with the controller. The Wii release was criticized for lacking the nine-button controller; NGamer claimed that the use of the Wii Remote lowered the game's difficulty, while Shacknews argued that the game was "impossibly crippled" by not having a peripheral device.

Several music commentators and game critics have commended the series' soundtrack: the music writer Kei Ichimura complimented the "originality" of each composer's style combining "seamlessly" with various genres. Impress Watch echoed the sentiment, arguing that the music was compelling and had an "energy" unique to the series. GameSpot felt that the Wii version contained a "catchier set of songs" compared to Dance Dance Revolution, and Total Control described the first Dreamcast port's soundtrack as having "something for everyone". Pop'n Music has also played a role in the early careers of several musical artists; Iori Saeki performed for the series under the alias NU-KO in her first singing role, and the Vocaloid producer cosMo@bousou-P listed Pop'n Music as an inspiration in his music.
