= Beat'n Groovy =

2008 video game

- Developer: Voltex
- Publisher: Konami
- Platform: Xbox 360 (XBLA)
- Release: NA: October 8, 2008
- Genre: Rhythm game
- Modes: Single-player, multiplayer

Beat'n Groovy is a music video game developed by Japanese studio Voltex and distributed over Xbox Live Arcade. It was released on October 8, 2008. The game is based on Pop'n Music, a similarly styled arcade/PlayStation 2 game series that, at the time, had not been released officially outside Japan.

== Gameplay ==
As scrolling notes scroll down the screen, the player is to press the corresponding button on the controller, which plays a keysound which fills in part of the selected song. Players are judged on the accuracy of their hits, and a life bar on the side of the screen increases or decreases depending on their performance. The life bar must be at or over 60% at the end of the song in order to pass. The game features nine songs (ranked on a difficulty level of 1 to 9, although the hardest song is only a 3), and seven playable characters. 3-key and 5-key modes are available, with online multiplayer modes using 3-key only. An additional play mode using the Xbox Live Vision camera is also available.

== Reception ==
IGN's Hilary Goldstien gave Beat'n Groovy a 2.0/10, critiquing the game as "poorly designed and poorly executed", and dubbing the song list as being "horrendous".
