= Castlevania: The Dracula X Chronicles =

2007 platform-adventure video game compilation

- North American cover art
- Developer: Konami
- Publisher: Konami
- Director: Akihiro Minakata
- Producer: Koji Igarashi
- Artist: Ayami Kojima
- Composers: Michiru Yamane; Masanori Akita; Yuichi Tsuchiya; Akihiro Honda; Yasuhiro Ichihashi
- Series: Castlevania
- Platform: PlayStation Portable
- Release: NA: October 23, 2007; JP: November 8, 2007; EU: February 15, 2008; AU: April 9, 2008
- Genre: Platform
- Modes: Single-player, multiplayer

Castlevania: The Dracula X Chronicles (Note: Known in Japan as Akumajō Dracula X-Chronicle (悪魔城ドラキュラ Xクロニクル, Akumajō Dorakyura Ekkusu Kuronikuru; lit. "Devil's Castle Dracula X-Chronicle")) is a 2007 platform game developed and published by Konami for the PlayStation Portable. The game is a remake of Castlevania: Rondo of Blood (1993) with 2.5D graphics, and marks the first time that Rondo of Blood was released outside of Japan. The game includes the original Rondo of Blood localized into English, as well as a remastered version of Castlevania: Symphony of the Night (1997). The game was released in North America on October 23, 2007.

== Gameplay ==
The game is a side-scrolling platformer rendered in 2.5D.

Dracula X Chronicles adds minor additions and features to the gameplay of Rondo of Blood. Two new obstacles, a barrier made of red skeletons, and a barrier made of crystal, are added to various parts of the game. Saving Tera and Iris grants the player respective items required to destroy these barriers. The puzzles required to save Iris and Annette have been altered. Stage 5 is given a revamped stage layout and a brand new boss, the Hydra. Not saving Annette forces the player to battle a vampire version of her in place of Shaft's ghost in Stage 7, which warrants a bad ending. This boss is moved to an alternate exit in Stage 5 if Annette has been saved. After saving Annette and defeating Shaft's ghost, Dracula gains a new third form which must be defeated to obtain the true ending.

New dialogue scenes are added, and pre-existing scenes are altered or extended. Small introductory cutscenes are added before boss fights. These are fully voiced in English and Japanese, and the player can choose the language in the options menu. The title of Stage 8 is renamed "Bloodlines", the same title as the introduction level in the English localization of Symphony of the Night. "Rondo of Blood" is the title in the original Japanese versions.

First seen in Castlevania: Harmony of Dissonance, a Boss Rush mode is added. The mode contains four courses, which differ in the set of bosses fought. This mode can be played cooperatively with a second player over the PSP's Ad-Hoc wireless connection.

While the original game featured anime style artwork, Castlevania: The Dracula X Chronicles contains new character designs by Castlevania: Symphony of the Night character designer Ayami Kojima.

=== Rondo of Blood ===
The original Rondo of Blood is included as unlockable content and remains largely identical to its PC Engine counterpart. As with its remake, the game is given new voice acting in English, a slightly revised script, and the option to listen to the English or Japanese voices. For the English dub, the same voice actors are used as in the remake. The original intro from Chi no Rondo, spoken in German, is intact and uses the German dub that is also used in the intro video to the remake. Stage names in English are identical to those used in the remake. However, due to a flaw within the game's programming, the audio does not load correctly to sync with the video, making them run out of sync with each other.

Also included as a separate unlockable game is Akumajyo Dracula X Peke [sic]. This mini-game would load on the original Rondo of Blood if the PC Engine did not have the required Super System 2.0 card. All of the Japanese text is translated for the English release. The system card requirement message is also removed to tell the player to press "start" to quit the game.

=== Symphony of the Night ===
Castlevania: Symphony of the Night is another unlockable game with original-style graphics like the PlayStation and Sega Saturn versions. It includes Maria Renard as a playable character, originally only found in the Sega Saturn version. Like the Xbox 360 version, "I Am the Wind" was replaced with "Mournful Serenade", a new piece composed by Michiru Yamane, as the closing theme. An English-recorded version of the song "Nocturne" was added, and several familiars that had been removed in previous international releases of the game were restored.

== Audio ==
The original Rondo of Blood soundtrack is rearranged and remastered. Two new songs are also included. Stage 5' is given a brand new song, "Red Dawn", while Stage 7 features "MoonFight" from Castlevania Chronicles. The boss theme "Poison Mind" no longer plays during the battle with the bosses from the original Castlevania on Stage 6. It still plays, however, in the final Stage. The game features an option called Sound Assign; this enables players to choose songs from the game, the original Rondo of Blood, and Symphony of the Night to play in the background. These songs are found in the form of records hidden within the game as well as prizes for beating Boss Rush mode.

== Reception ==
Reception

Aggregate scores
Aggregator	Score
Metacritic	80/100
OpenCritic	49% recommend(As part of Castlevania Requiem) (Note: Based on 45 reviews.)

Review scores
Publication	Score
Destructoid	7.5/10
Game Informer	70/100
GameSpot	8/10
GamesRadar+	70/100
IGN	8/10
Pocket Gamer	3.5/5

Castlevania: The Dracula X Chronicles received an aggregate score of 80/100 on Metacritic.

Ryan Clements of IGN wrote that "the game looks pretty good" and that the new 2.5D graphics gave it an "interesting aesthetic appeal". He also praised the cutscenes and the game's rearranged musical score, although he called the new voice acting "questionable". Praising the branching level design, he nevertheless said that the "old-school" gameplay of the title would turn away players accustomed to the more refined gameplay mechanics of Symphony of the Night.

8BitBrian of Destructoid compared the game's bundle release to The Orange Box. He stated that the game was a "jarring experience" when comparing its gameplay to newer Castlevania titles, and while "struggling through the game the first time", he enjoyed the second time he played more. However, he complained about the game's "poor hit detection", and stated he enjoyed playing as Maria more because of her double jump ability. He called the remake's graphics "amazing", but similarly criticized the voice acting, saying that the voices "sound stiff and are delivered poorly".

Matthew Kumar of Eurogamer described it as "a release made for, and by, Castlevania fans". He stated that while he did not particularly enjoy the remake, the added inclusions of the original title and Symphony of the Night made it a much better value. He called the jumping in the remake "much harder in 3D" and criticized having to hold diagonals to walk up stairs "unbearable" on the PSP. Calling the remake "too rigid [...] to be rewarding at all", he said that its one "saving grace" was the ability to unlock Maria, with a quick attack and double jump that "makes the game bearable".
