= Tokimeki Memorial Taisen Puzzle-dama =

1995 video game

- Cover to the Sega Saturn version
- Developer: Konami
- Publisher: Konami
- Composers: Yuji Takenouchi; Yoshihiko Koezuka; Kazuhiro Senoo
- Series: Taisen Puzzle-dama; Tokimeki Memorial
- Platforms: Arcade, PlayStation, Sega Saturn, PC
- Release: December 1995: Arcade; JP: December 1995 PlayStation; JP: September 27, 1996; JP: September 18, 2003 (PSone Books) Saturn; JP: September 27, 1996 PC; JP: December 27, 1996 PlayStation Network; JP: January 13, 2010
- Genre: Puzzle
- Modes: Single-player, multiplayer
- Arcade system: Konami System GX

Tokimeki Memorial Taisen Puzzle-dama (ときめきメモリアル対戦ぱずるだま) is a Tokimeki Memorial themed Taisen Puzzle-dama spin-off game. It is followed by a sequel, Tokimeki Memorial 2 Puzzle-dama. It was re-released in Japan on the PlayStation Store on January 13, 2010.

== Release and reception ==
Reception

Review score
Publication	Score
Dengeki PlayStation	65/100, 70/100, 75/100, 60/100

The arcade game version of Tokimeki Memorial Taisen Puzzle-dama was released in December 1995. The PlayStation version was released on May 27, 1996 and for Windows 95 on December 27, 1996.

A version for the Sega Saturn was released on August 7, 1997.

In Japan, Game Machine listed Tokimeki Memorial Taisen Puzzle-dama in their February 1, 1996 issue as being the twelfth most-successful arcade game of the month.
