= Taisen Puzzle-dama (video game) =

1994 video game

- Arcade flyer
- Developer: Konami
- Publisher: Konami
- Composer: Naomitsu Ariyama
- Series: Taisen Puzzle-dama
- Platform: Arcade
- Release: JP: July 1994
- Genre: Puzzle
- Modes: Single-player, multiplayer

Taisen Puzzle-dama (対戦ぱずるだま, Taisen Pazuru-Dama; lit. "Battle Puzzle Ball") is a puzzle video game and the first video game in the Taisen Puzzle-dama series. It was released in July 1994 by Konami in Japanese arcades. It was released in Europe as Crazy Cross.

== Gameplay ==
John Wanjiro versus Yumi-chan

The gameplay is similar to Puyo Puyo. The player must beat the opponent by creating combos, which involve matching three balls or more of the same color simultaneously. Doing so will fill the opponent's side with colored blocks from either the top or bottom. The blocks contain a certain ball color, depending on the color of the block. When blocks are matched, the color ball is released. The side that exceeds the top first loses. Score is also added for both sides, but the opponent's score doesn't affect the rounds in any way.

=== Characters ===
- Penkuro (ペンクロー, Penkurō) (voiced by Ai Orikasa)
- Mayu Sawada (沢田まゆ, Sawada Mayu) (voiced by Chisa Yokoyama)
- Yumi-chan (ユミちゃん, Yumi-chan) (voiced by ???)
- John Wanjiro (ジョン・ワン次郎, Jon wan Jirō) (voiced by ???)
- Doctor Nakasugi (ドクター中杉, Dokutā Nakasugi) (voiced by Issei Futamata)
- Ryo (リョウ, Ryō) (voiced by Toshiyuki Morikawa)
- Robo No. 2 '63 (ロボ作２号63年製, Robo-saku Ni-gō Rokujutsu Kara San-nen-sei) (voiced by ???)
- Makorin (まこりん, Makorin) (voiced by Hekiru Shiina)
- Chief Shima (嶋課長, Kachō Shima) (voiced by Toshiyuki Morikawa)
- Kenzo Oiwa (大岩権造, Ōiwa Kenzō) (voiced by Toshiyuki Morikawa)
- Temple Lord (殿様, Tono-sama) (voiced by Toshiyuki Morikawa)

== Reception ==
Taisen Puzzle-dama was Japan's third highest-grossing arcade printed circuit board (PCB) software of 1995, below Virtua Fighter 2 and Puzzle Bobble.
