= List of castles in Brazil =

This is a list of castles in Brazil.

Not having witnessed feudalism, Brazil does not have a lot of historic castles, but presents many castles built for tourism and entertainment, and also has factories and forts from colonial times. Some castles were built for religious purposes or to support the Arts, and the Sciences, others have quite an interesting history.

- Castelo do Barão J. Smith de Vasconcellos
- Castelo de Pedras Altas
- Castelo do Batel - Curitiba
- Castelo do Pereira
- Ilha Fiscal
- Baruel Mansion
- Castelo de Pesqueira
- Castelo de Zé dos Montes
- Castelo do Instituto Ricardo Brennand
- Villa Medieval
- Castelo Garcia d'Ávila
- Castelo Mourisco
- Castelo do Lua Cheia Hostel
- Castelo Simões Lopes
- Castelo Furlani
- Castelo de Itaipava
- Castelo Eldorado
- Châuteau Lacave
- Castelo João Capão
- Castelo de Araras
- Castelo de Bívar
- Castelo Deputado Leonardo Moreira
- Castelo de José Rico

== See also ==
- List of castles by country
