= List of castles in Malta =

This is a list of castles in Malta.

| Name | Image | Location | Built | Details |
|---|---|---|---|---|
| Castrum Maris | | Birgu | c. 13th century | The Castrum Maris was built in around the 12th or 13th century, on a site which had been inhabited since prehistory. The castle was administered by a Castellan appointed by Malta's Sicilian rulers. It was gradually rebuilt as a bastioned gunpowder fortress by the Knights Hospitaller between the 1530s and 1690s, becoming known as Fort St. Angelo. Some remains of the medieval castle still survive within the fort. |
| Gran Castello | | Victoria, Gozo | c. 13th century | The Gozo Castello was built during the medieval period on the site of an ancient acropolis. The earliest reference to the castle dates back to 1241, and over the centuries it was gradually transformed into a citadel. It was partially rebuilt as a gunpowder fortress by the Knights Hospitaller between 1599 and 1622, but the northern walls still retain a medieval configuration dating back to Aragonese rule, although with later modifications. |
| Castellu di la Chitati | | Mdina | Unknown | The castle was part of the fortifications of Mdina. It was built at some point during the medieval period, possibly by the Swabians, and likely on the site of an earlier Byzantine fort. It was partially demolished by royal licence sometime after 1453, but the outer walls were retained since they formed an integral part of the city walls. Grand Master Philippe Villiers de L'Isle-Adam built a palace on the site of the castle in the 1530s. The palace and the remaining outer walls of the castle were demolished in the 1720s during the magistracy of António Manoel de Vilhena, and the Vilhena Palace was built on the site of the castle. |

== Castle-like palaces and towers ==
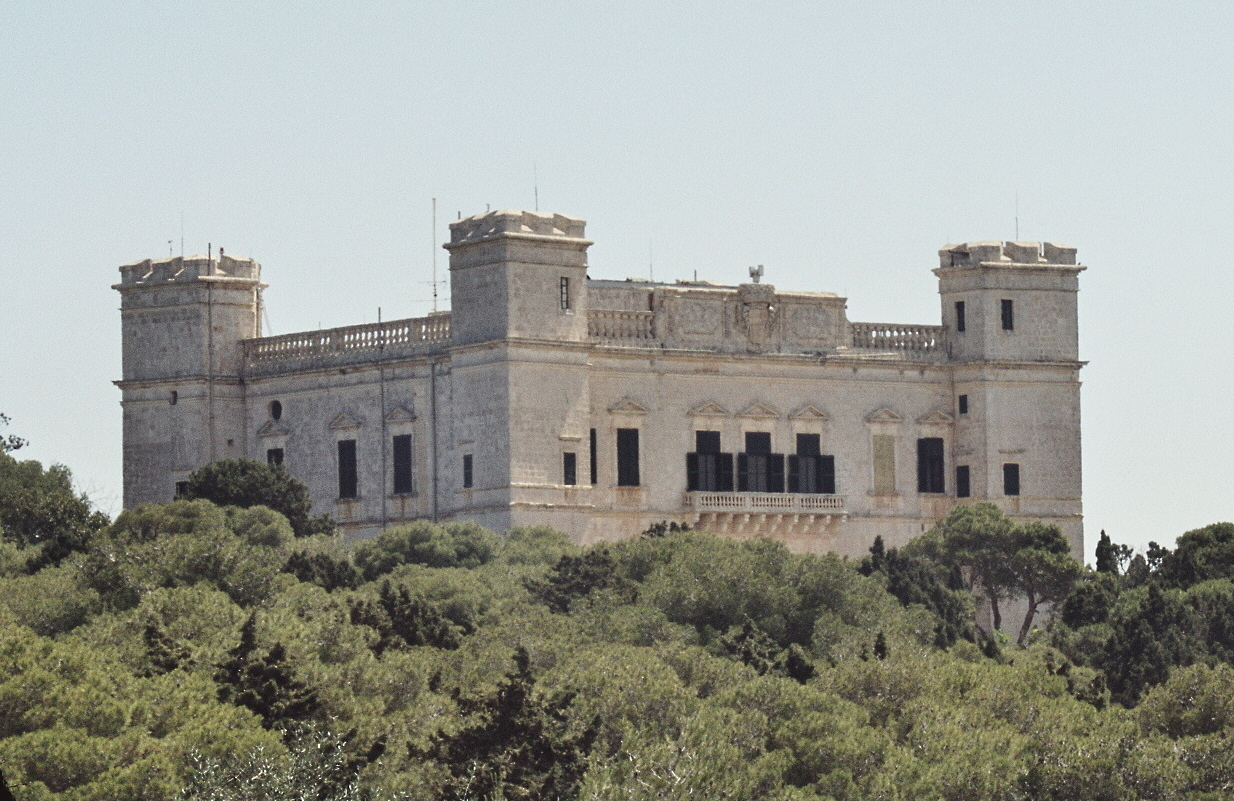
The Verdala Palace, a 16th-century palace sometimes referred to as a castle

A number of towers, palaces and other buildings built in Malta after the medieval period are sometimes referred to as castles. These include the 16th-century Verdala Palace, the 18th-century Selmun Palace, the 19th-century Zammitello Palace and the 20th-century Castello Dei Baroni. Most of these were not actually fortified and were not built to withstand an attack, although the Verdala Palace was armed with artillery pieces.

Other buildings claimed as castles in Malta include: Bubaqra Tower (Zurrieq), Castel Qannotta (Wardija), Chateaux Bertrand (destroyed - Ta’ Qali), a number of baronial buildings and wedding venues.

== See also ==
- List of fortifications in Malta
