= List of castles in Israel =

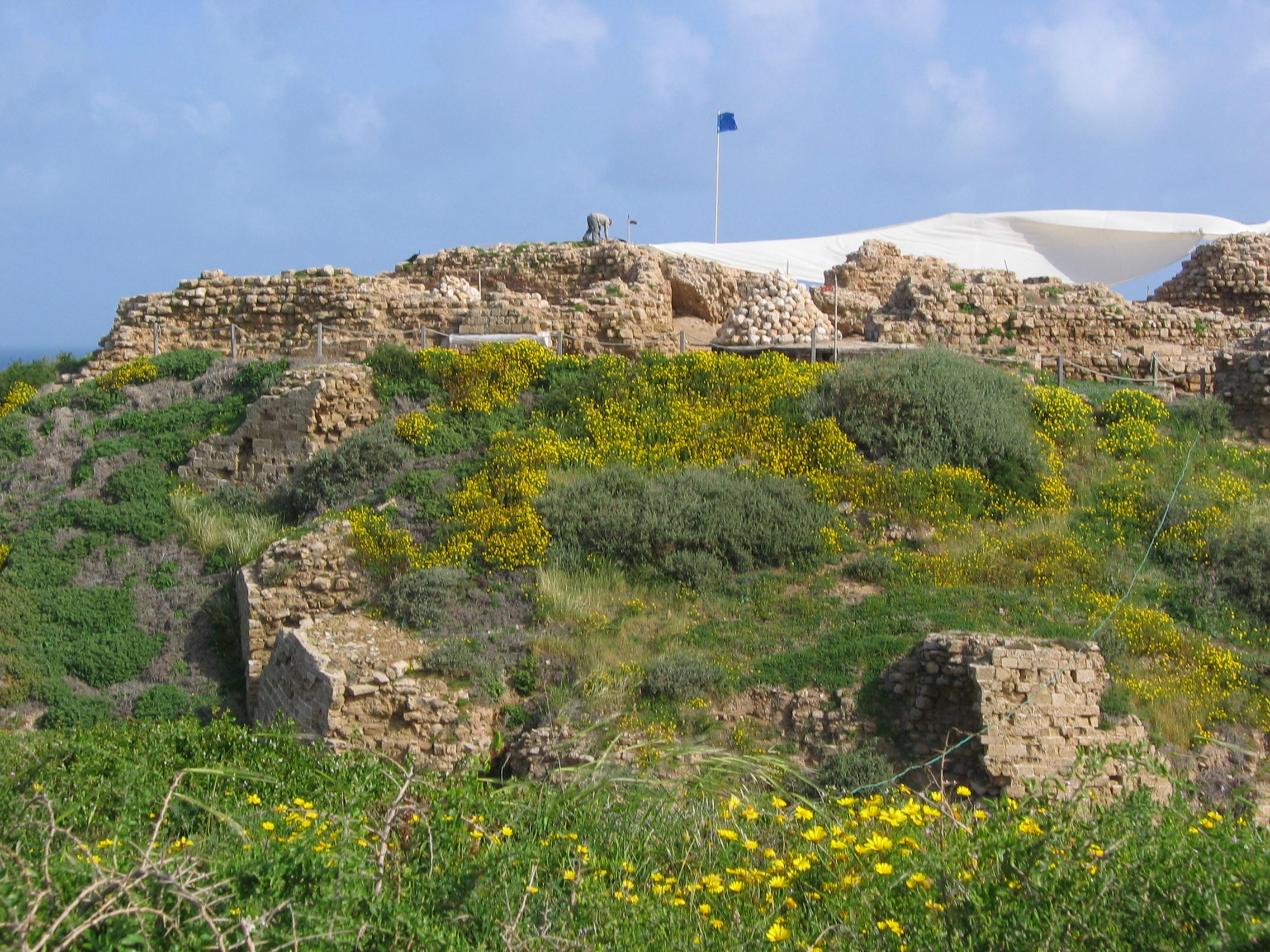
Apollonia–Arsuf

This is a list of castles in Israel.

- Al-Al Castle
- Apollonia – Arsuf a Crusader fortress located at the seashore of Herzliya.
- Belvoir Castle is a Crusader castle located at Northern District.
- Cafarlet is an Early Muslim coastal fortress of the Roman castrum type.
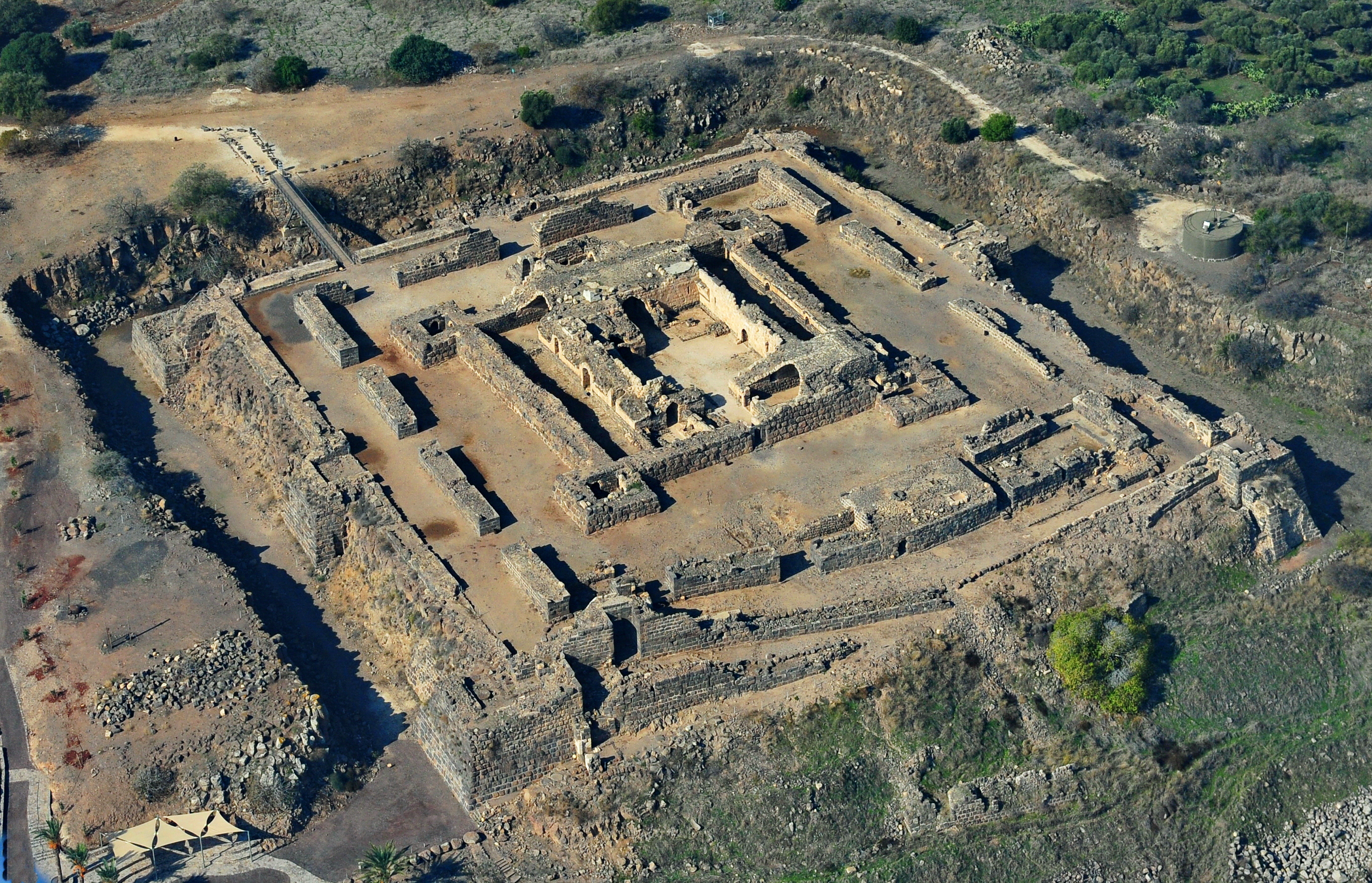
  Belvoir Castle
- Château Pèlerin is a Crusader fortress and fortified town located about 2 kilometres (1.2 mi) north of the modern Israeli town of Atlit
- Migdal Afek is a national park on the southeastern edge of Rosh HaAyin.
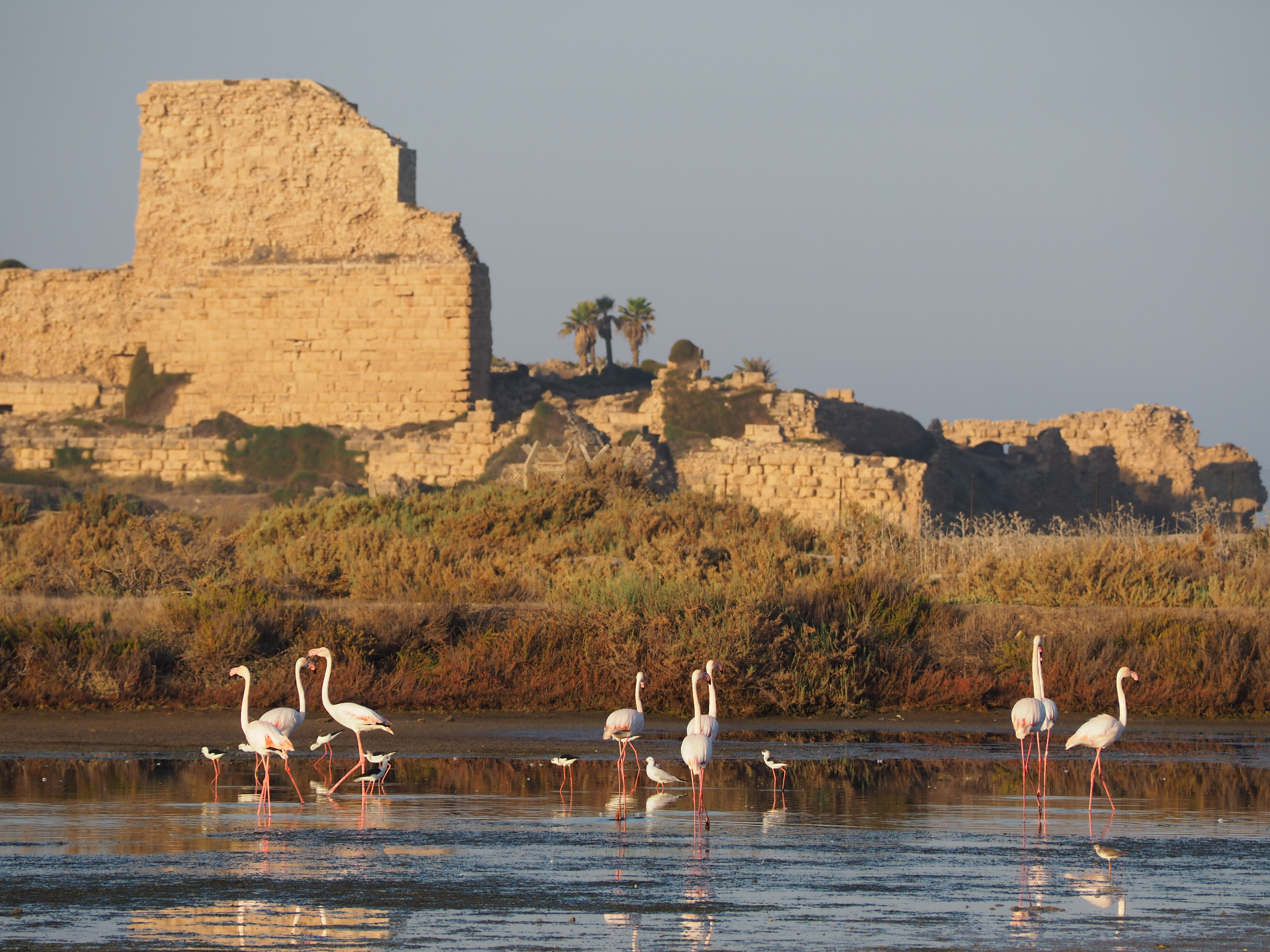
  Château Pèlerin
- Montfort Castle is a ruined Crusader castle in the Upper Galilee region in northern Israel.
- Caco In the Crusader period, a castle called Caco or Cacho stood in Qaqun, of which an 8.5m tower survives.
- Tower of David is an ancient citadel located near the Jaffa Gate entrance to the Old City of Jerusalem.
