= Inverted Castle =

Video game location

- Castlevania location
- First appearance: Castlevania: Symphony of the Night (1997)

In-universe information
- Type: Castle
- Ruled by: Dracula

The Inverted Castle is a setting of the video game Castlevania: Symphony of the Night (1997), which was designed by Koji Igarashi. Players control the protagonist Alucard as they explore this castle, an inversion of Dracula's Castle, the setting Alucard explores earlier in the game which is based on the traditional depiction of Castle Dracula from the horror novel by Bram Stoker and related media. The Inverted Castle that was included because the designers wanted to add more content without having to create new assets. It served as inspiration for content in multiple games, such as in creator Koji Igarashi's Bloodstained: Ritual of the Night.

The Inverted Castle received mixed reception. Some critics, such as those for IGN, GamePro, and Edge, felt it was one of the best gaming moments, citing how the original castle was designed to be playable in both orientations. Staff for IGN and The Escapist felt it was an important factor to why Symphony of the Night was so good. Other critics, such as USgamer staff, were more critical; they felt that it was at times tedious and "annoying," though senior editor Kat Bailey found the "meta aspect" fit with the "weird and chaotic" nature of Dracula's Castle.

== Summary ==
The Inverted Castle appears in Castlevania: Symphony of the Night, floating above the game's standard castle in the sky while obscured by clouds. It is hidden until the protagonist, Alucard, defeats Shaft, a minion of the castle's ruler, Dracula, using a pair of holy glasses to see him. If players do not have this item and defeat Richter Belmont instead (who is being possessed by Shaft), the game will end there. Alucard can then travel between these two locations. The Inverted Castle has the same layout of the regular castle, except upside down, and it is treated as a separate map. It contains new enemies and items to encounter, and Alucard must collect various relics of Dracula in order to do combat with him. At one point, he encounters zombies that assume the form of Trevor Belmont, Sypha Belnades, and Grant DaNasty, all of whom appear in the video game Castlevania III: Dracula's Curse as his allies.

== Concept and creation ==
Dracula's castle is the predominant setting of the Castlevania series. The open world and emphasis on exploration of Symphony of the Night takes inspiration from The Legend of Zelda, as well as the exploration-focused Castlevania II: Simon's Quest. According to director Koji Igarashi, the Inverted Castle was created due to the designers wanting to add more content in a way that would be easier than creating new assets. The castle was designed in such a way that it works in both orientations.

== Reception ==
The Inverted Castle has received mixed reception; it is regarded as a significant video game secret. Developer Jonathan Blow talked about how it was a "cool" secret that "everybody freaked out about" and discussed how the Inverted Castle stood in contrast to modern game design and did not push players into a certain play experience. GamePro staff listed the discovery of the Inverted Castle as one of the greatest gaming moments, while Edge staff ranked Symphony of the Night as one of the best games to play today, citing the Inverted Castle as a key reason for why it is "genius." IGN writer Marty Sliva called it a "triumph of level design" and that it "melted [players'] mind[s]" when they experienced it, and IGN staff regarded it as the greatest secret levels in video games. It was also included in IGN's list of the most memorable video game moments, with Sliva feeling that the Inverted Castle helped make Symphony of the Night one of the best video games. Pereira agreed with its significance to Symphony of the Night's popularity, calling it a "truly remarkable feature" and "just as beautiful" as the regular castle. Writer Joseph Yaden, while noting that the regular castle was impressive, the Inverted Castle was a "testament" to how much planning and design went into the game's creation, talking about how players recognize this design detail upon replaying the regular castle. Being able to clear platforming challenges once thought impossible made the Inverted Castle feel triumphant, stating that Symphony of the Night is known for it.

RPGFan writer Josh Curry identified it as one of the reasons he respected Symphony of the Night as much as he did. Eurogamer writer Jeffrey Matulef called it "brilliant design," noting that while it sounds "lazy and repetitious," it was anything but, and helped designers add more content easily. Turi described it as a "powerful feeling" to discover the Inverted Castle and how the castle was designed to be played upside down, expressing hope that Igarashi would explore this idea in the future. Kotaku writer Peter Tieryas discussed how the Inverted Castle ties into the inversion of Dracula's name and Alucard's need to oppose his father and destroy his past, citing the fight against fake versions of Trevor, Sypha, and Grant. Author Paul Martin discussed how the Inverted Castle, as well as players' and Alucard's strength and ease of movement, represents both of their ownership over the castle, and the risk of Alucard becoming more like his father.

Screen Rant writer Leon Miller found the Inverted Castle unsatisfying, criticizing it for being too similar to the normal castle. USgamer writer Jeremy Parish compared it to the Dark World in The Legend of Zelda: A Link to the Past, a "twisted version" of the main world of that game. Parish felt that the game was not designed with the Inverted Castle in mind, criticizing it for requiring constant transformations by Alucard to reach certain heights. He also felt that the difficulty of the area was achieved through being annoying. Despite this, he appreciated references to Castlevania II: Simon's Quest and Castlevania III; he cited the fight with Trevor, Sypha, and Grant as an example of the designers trying to "develop a curve of complexity" despite the difficulty of doing so when the protagonist has grown so strong. He also enjoyed the references made to non-Castlevania works, such as The Wizard of Oz. Fellow USgamer Mike Williams agreed with Parish's criticisms; he felt that it was interesting to see the castle upside down, but had poor flow and felt like backtracking. He felt it was the worst aspect of an "otherwise excellent game." USgamer senior editor Kat Bailey agreed with Parish's criticisms, though noted that she appreciated the "meta aspect" of the Inverted Castle, namely that Dracula's Castle is meant to be "weird and chaotic," calling it a "great twist" and appreciating it for being more open in its exploration. Another USgamer writer, Nadia Oxford, found the Inverted Castle enjoyable, showing appreciation for how the "deepest catacombs of the castle wind up floating in the sky". However, Oxford was critical of "lacking" soundtrack in the Inverted Castle.

== Legacy ==
Bloodstained: Ritual of the Night, a game created by Igarashi, also features an homage to the Inverted Castle through the use of the Invert shard, which vertically flips the screen. There is also an area called the Den of Behemoths, which is a magnified version of a portion of the castle, which is in effect the 'Inverted Castle' in this game. Vampire Survivors, a game heavily inspired by Castlevania, features an "inverse mode" for each stage, in which the environment is flipped upside down, and both enemies and drops are boosted.
