= Castillo Douglas =

Coordinates: 21.8855°N 102.2906°W

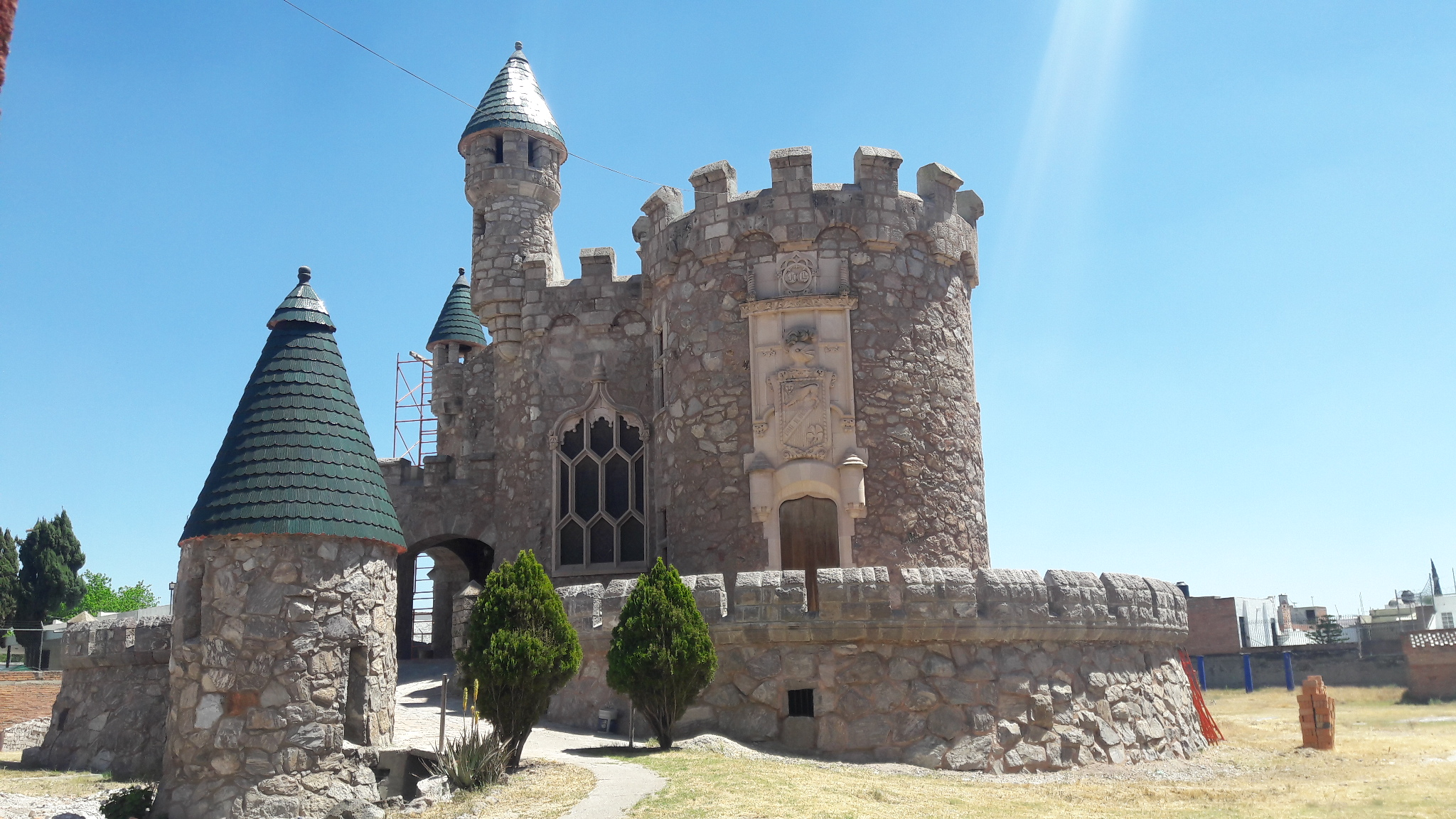
- Castillo Douglas in 2019
- Interactive map of the Castillo Douglas area
- Alternative names: Castillo Ortega; Douglas Castle

General information
- Type: House
- Location: Vázquez del Mercado, Aguascalientes, Mexico
- Named for: John Douglas
- Client: Edmundo Ortega Douglas

Design and construction
- Architect: Federico Mariscal
- Main contractor: J. Refugio Reyes Rivas

Castillo Ortega-Douglas (English: Ortega-Douglas Castle), also known as Castillo Douglas, is a castle-like house in central Aguascalientes, Aguascalientes, Mexico. Designed by Federico Mariscal and supervised by J. Refugio Reyes Rivas, it was built for Edmundo Ortega Douglas, whose maternal grandfather, John Douglas (1849–1918), had emigrated to Mexico from Scotland. The house is notable for having the features of a medieval castle, including a moat, a drawbridge, battlements, turrets, and a stained glass window.
