= Třebovka =

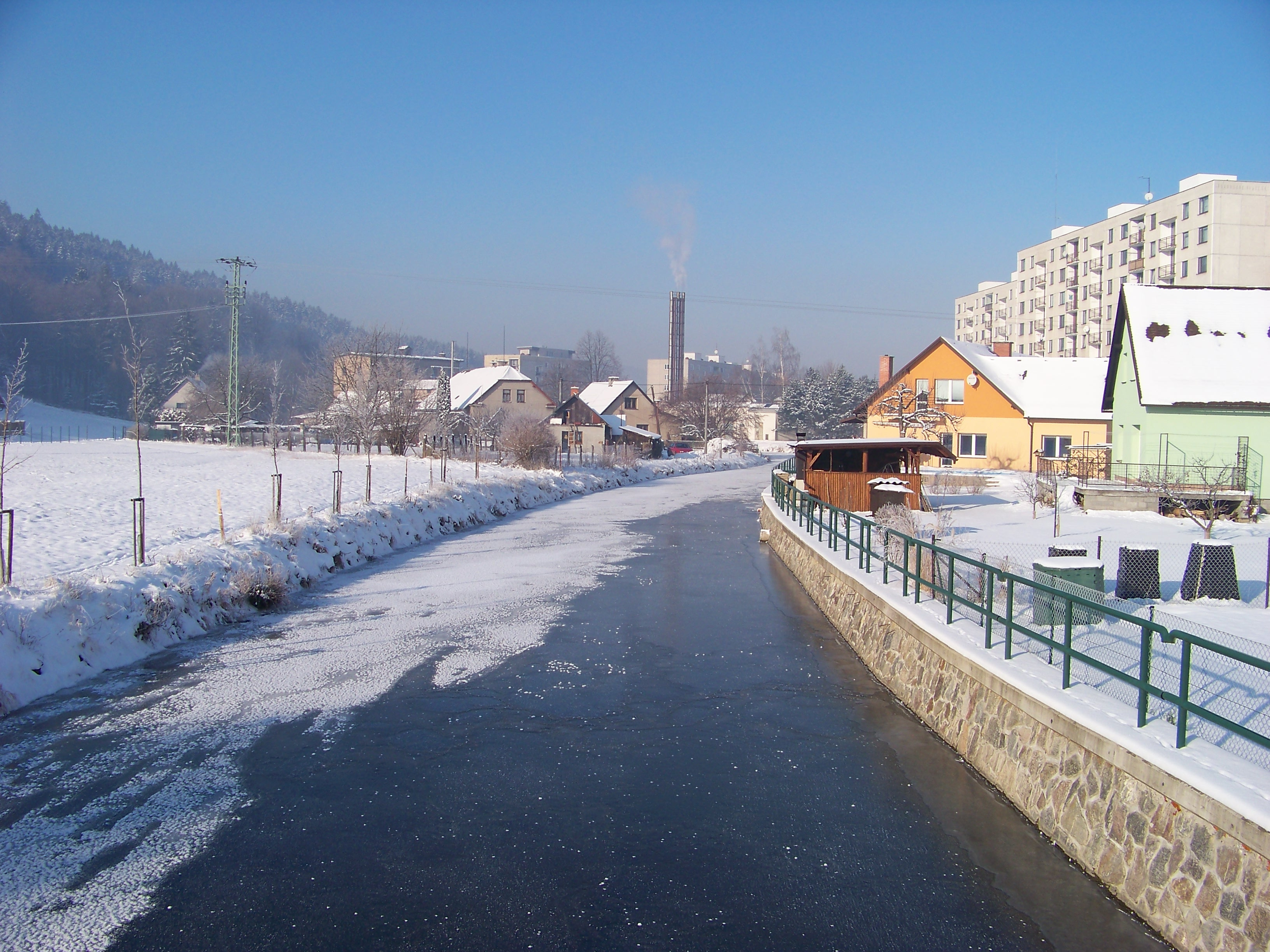
- The Třebovka in Ústí nad Orlicí

Location
- Country: Czech Republic
- Region: Pardubice

Physical characteristics
- Source
  - location: Koclířov, Svitavy Uplands
  - coordinates: 49°44′56″N 16°33′57″E
  - elevation: 572 m (1,877 ft)
- Mouth
  - location: Tichá Orlice
  - coordinates: 49°58′17″N 16°23′6″E
  - elevation: 321 m (1,053 ft)
- Length: 41.2 km (25.6 mi)
- Basin size: 196.0 km^{2} (75.7 sq mi)
- Discharge
  - average: 0.97 m^{3}/s (34 cu ft/s) near estuary

Basin features
- Progression: Tichá Orlice→ Orlice→ Elbe→ North Sea

The Třebovka is a river in the Czech Republic, a left tributary of the Tichá Orlice River. It flows through the Pardubice Region. It is 41.2 km (25.6 mi) long.

== Etymology ==
The name is derived from the old Czech verb triebiti, which meant 'chop down', 'clear'. The name refers to the founding of settlements on the site of forest that had to be cut down first. First the name of the Třebovka river was created, then it was transferred to the settlements along the river (Třebovice, Česká Třebová, Dlouhá Třebová).

== Characteristic ==
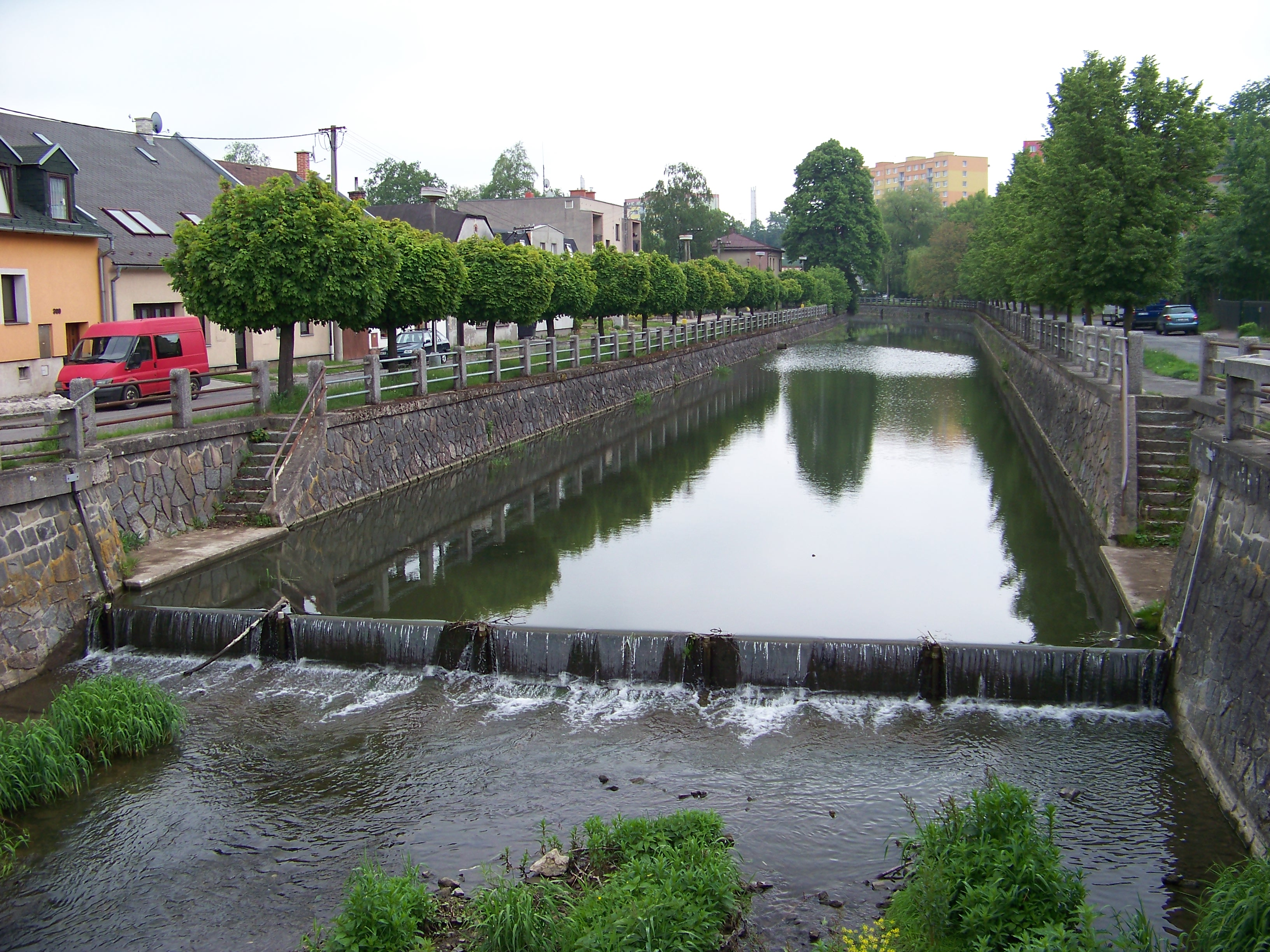
The Třebovka in Česká Třebová

The Třebovka originates in the territory of Koclířov in the Svitavy Uplands at an elevation of 572 m (1,877 ft) and flows to Ústí nad Orlicí, where it enters the Tichá Orlice River at an elevation of 321 m (1,053 ft). It is 41.2 km (25.6 mi) long. Its drainage basin has an area of 196.0 km^{2} (75.7 sq mi).

The average discharge at 3.4 river km, before the confluence of the Třebovka and Knapovecký potok, is 0.87 m^{3}/s (31 cu ft/s).

The longest tributaries of the Třebovka are:

Tributary	Length (km)	Side
Mikulečský potok	8.5	left
Zádolský potok	8.4	left
Knapovecký potok	7.4	right

== Course ==
The river flows through the municipal territories of Koclířov, Dětřichov, Opatov, Třebovice, Rybník, Česká Třebová, Dlouhá Třebová and Ústí nad Orlicí.

== Bodies of water ==
There are 79 bodies of water in the basin area. The largest of them is the fishpond Hvězda with an area of 74.9 ha (185 acres), built directly on the Třebovka.

== Tourism ==
The Třebovka is suitable for river tourism only in spring or after heavy rains. If the flow is sufficient, the navigable section is 13 km (8 mi) long and is also suitable to less experienced paddlers.

== Floods ==
The river did damage during floods in 1997 and 2006.

== See also ==
- List of rivers of the Czech Republic
