= Opatov =

Opatov may refer to places in the Czech Republic:

- Opatov (Prague Metro), a metro station in Prague
- Opatov (Jihlava District), a municipality and village in the Vysočina Region
- Opatov (Svitavy District), a municipality and village in the Pardubice Region
  - Opatov Photovoltaics Plant, a plant in the municipality
- Opatov (Třebíč District), a market town in the Vysočina Region
- Opatov, a village and part of Luby (Cheb District) in the Karlovy Vary Region
