= Dětřichov =

Dětřichov may refer to places in the Czech Republic:

- Dětřichov (Liberec District), a municipality and village in the Liberec Region
- Dětřichov (Svitavy District), a municipality and village in the Pardubice Region
- Dětřichov nad Bystřicí, a municipality and village in the Moravian-Silesian Region
- Dětřichov u Moravské Třebové, a municipality and village in the Pardubice Region
- Dětřichov, a village and part of Jeseník in the Olomouc Region
- Dětřichov, a village and part of Uničov in the Olomouc Region
