= Oldřich Marek =

Czech entomologist

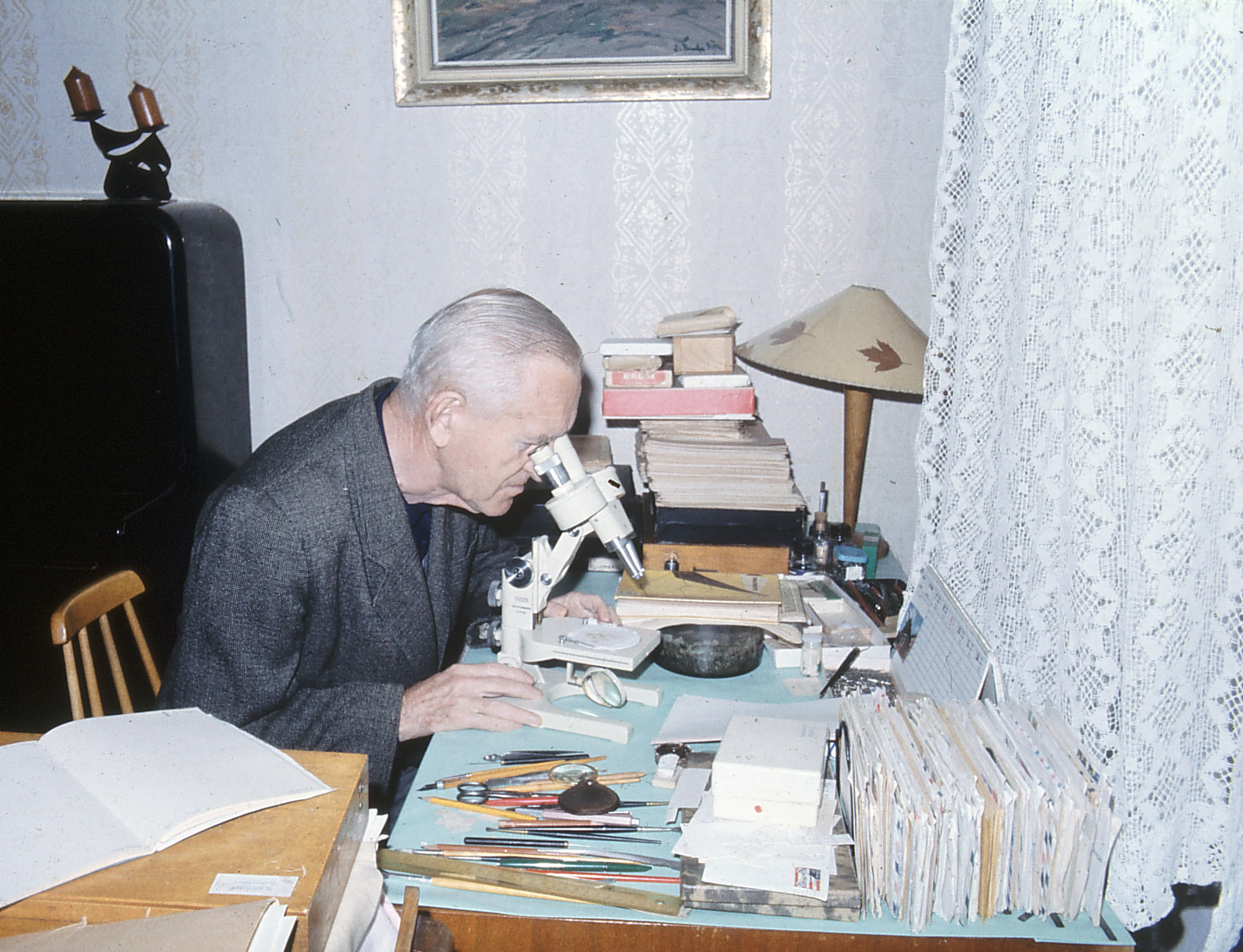
- Oldřich Marek at work
- Born: 3 April 1911; Ústí nad Orlicí, Austria-Hungary
- Died: 26 December 1986 (aged 75); Žamberk, Czechoslovakia
- Education: Teacher's Institute in Hradec Králové
- Occupation: Teacher

Oldřich Marek (3 April 1911 – 26 December 1986) was a Czech entomologist and teacher. He was a member of Czechoslovak entomological society in Prague starting in 1940.

== Life ==
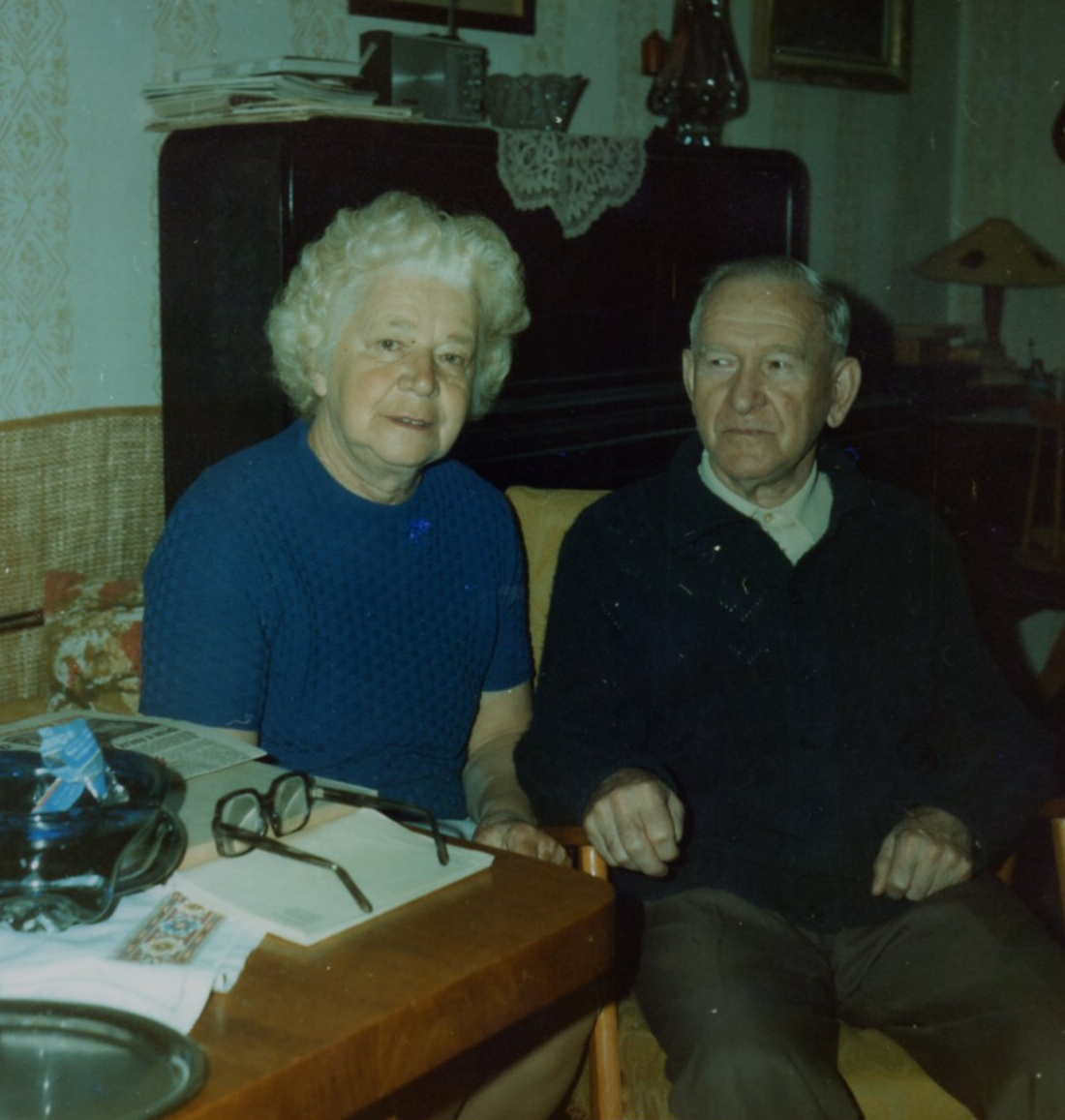
Oldřich Marek and his wife Blažena, née Pravečková

Oldřich Marek was born on 3 April 1911 in Ústí nad Orlicí. He attended primary school in Dolní Čermná and secondary school in Česká Třebová. After completing secondary school he left for Slovakia to become a primary school teacher in Smolník, Stakčín and Trnava.

During World War II (1938–1945) he was employed as a teacher in Slatina, Litice nad Orlicí and Dolní Čermná. In 1941 he began teaching mathematics, physics, chemistry and natural science at secondary school. After military duties in 1945 he worked as a secondary school teacher in Žamberk until his retirement in 1971.

== Work ==
He was a member of Czechoslovak entomological society in Prague starting in 1940. He specialised in Coleoptera especially the family Nitidulidae. In this group he studied the world fauna describing many new genera and species.

== Literature ==
- Marek, O. & Jelínek, J. 1966. Two new Palaearctic species of the genus Meligethes Steph. (Coleoptera, Nitidulidae). Acta Entomologica Bohemoslovaca 63: 453-458.
- Marek, O. 1968. Nitiduliden-Fauna (Coleoptera) aus Liberia. Natura Jutlandica 14: 153-154.
- Marek, O. 1969. Die Nitiduliden Fauna von Brasilien (Coleoptera, Nitidulidae), erster Teil. Papeis Avulsos do Departamento de Zoologia Sao Paulo 22: 153-157.
- Marek, O. 1982. Nitidulidae (Coleoptera) of Brazil 2. Revista Brasileira de Entomologia 26(3-4): 261-268.
