= Dolní Čermná =

- Market town
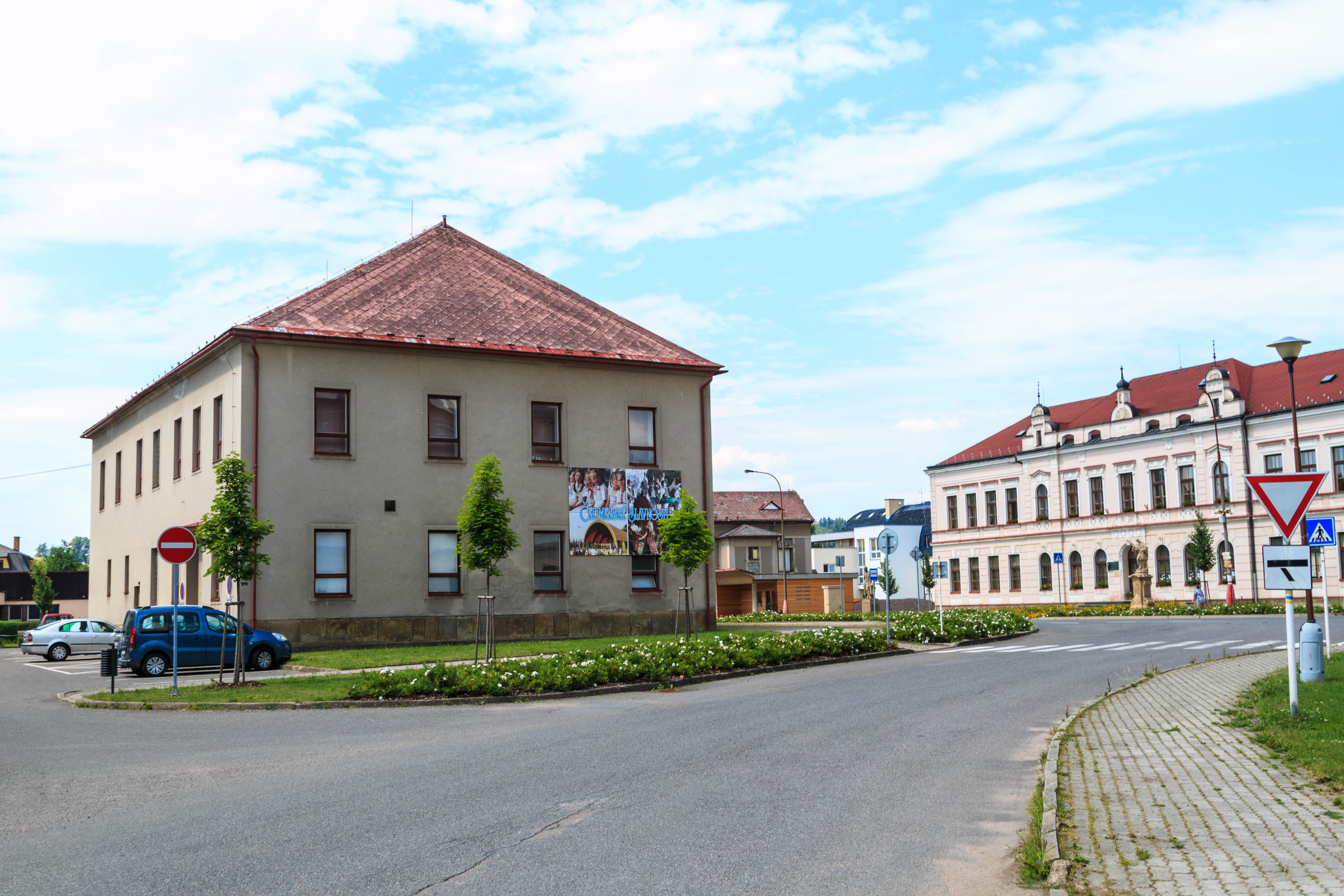
- Centre of Dolní Čermná

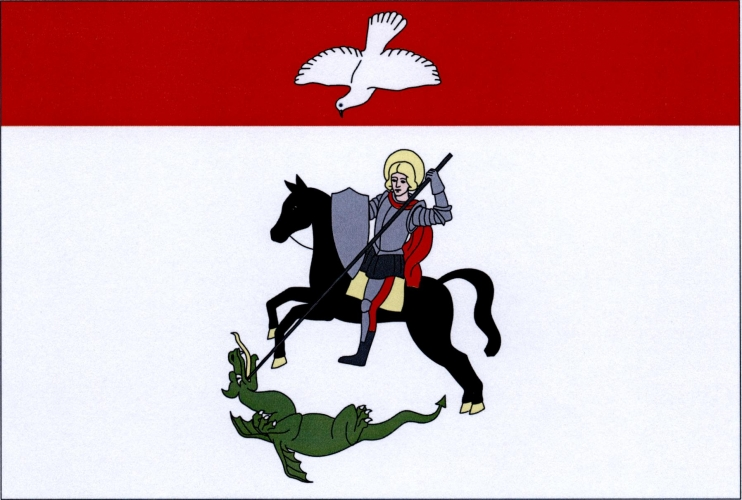
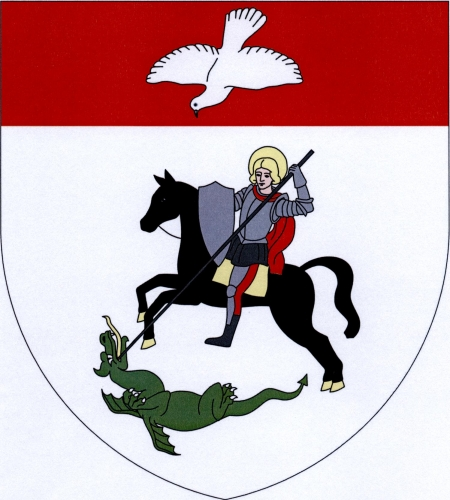
- Flag Coat of arms

- Location in the Czech Republic
- Coordinates: 49°58′46″N 16°33′53″E
- Country: Czech Republic
- Region: Pardubice
- District: Ústí nad Orlicí
- First mentioned: 1304

Area
  - Total: 15.03 km^{2} (5.80 sq mi)
- Elevation: 394 m (1,293 ft)

Population (2026-01-01)
  - Total: 1,326
  - Density: 88.22/km^{2} (228.5/sq mi)
- Time zone: UTC+1 (CET)
  - Summer (DST): UTC+2 (CEST)
- Postal code: 561 53
- Website: dolni-cermna.cz

Dolní Čermná (Czech pronunciation: [ˈdolɲiː ˈtʃɛrmnaː]; German: Niedertscherma) is a market town in Ústí nad Orlicí District in the Pardubice Region of the Czech Republic. It has about 1,300 inhabitants.

== Administrative division ==
Dolní Čermná consists of two municipal parts (in brackets population according to the 2021 census):

- Dolní Čermná (1,210)
- Jakubovice (114)

== Geography ==
Dolní Čermná is located about 11 kilometres (7 mi) east of Ústí nad Orlicí and 55 km (34 mi) east of Pardubice. It lies in the Orlické Foothills. The highest point is the hill Červený vrch at 528 m (1,732 ft) above sea level. The Čermná Stream flows through the market town. The market town is situated on the shore of the fishpond Čermenský rybník.

== History ==
Dolní Čermná was probably founded during the colonisation during the reign of King Ottokar II between 1253 and 1278. The first written mention of Dolní Čermná is in a deed of King Wenceslaus II from 1304, when the village was part of the Lanškroun estate donated to the newly established Zbraslav Monastery. In 1358, the estate was acquired by the bishopric in Litomyšl.

In 1432, the estate was bought by the Kostka of Postupice family. They founded the fishpond Čermenský rybník in the village. From 1507 to 1588, the estate was a property of the Pernštejn family, then they sold it to Adam Herzán of Harasov. His sons inherited the estate in 1622, but soon sold it to the Liechtenstein family, who owned it until the establishment of a sovereign municipality in 1848. In 1873, Dolní Čermná was promoted to a market town.

== Demographics ==
Historical population

| Year | Pop. | ±% |
|---|---|---|
| 1869 | 3,711 | — |
| 1880 | 3,479 | −6.3% |
| 1890 | 3,568 | +2.6% |
| 1900 | 3,428 | −3.9% |
| 1910 | 3,429 | +0.0% |

| Year | Pop. | ±% |
|---|---|---|
| 1921 | 3,155 | −8.0% |
| 1930 | 1,634 | −48.2% |
| 1950 | 1,131 | −30.8% |
| 1961 | 1,249 | +10.4% |
| 1970 | 1,253 | +0.3% |

| Year | Pop. | ±% |
|---|---|---|
| 1980 | 1,238 | −1.2% |
| 1991 | 1,294 | +4.5% |
| 2001 | 1,337 | +3.3% |
| 2011 | 1,264 | −5.5% |
| 2021 | 1,324 | +4.7% |

Source: Censuses

== Transport ==
There are no railways or major roads passing through the municipality.

== Sport ==
The sports complex called Areál zdraví a sportu Dolní Čermná is located in the south of the town. The complex includes an all-weather area that contains tennis courts, a football pitch and other sports grounds.

The site of the football pitch used to be a motorcycle speedway venue from 1949 to 1967, when it hosted the Junek Memorial race. The 444 metres track also hosted a final round of the Czechoslovak Individual Speedway Championship in 1954, 1962 and 1963.

== Sights ==
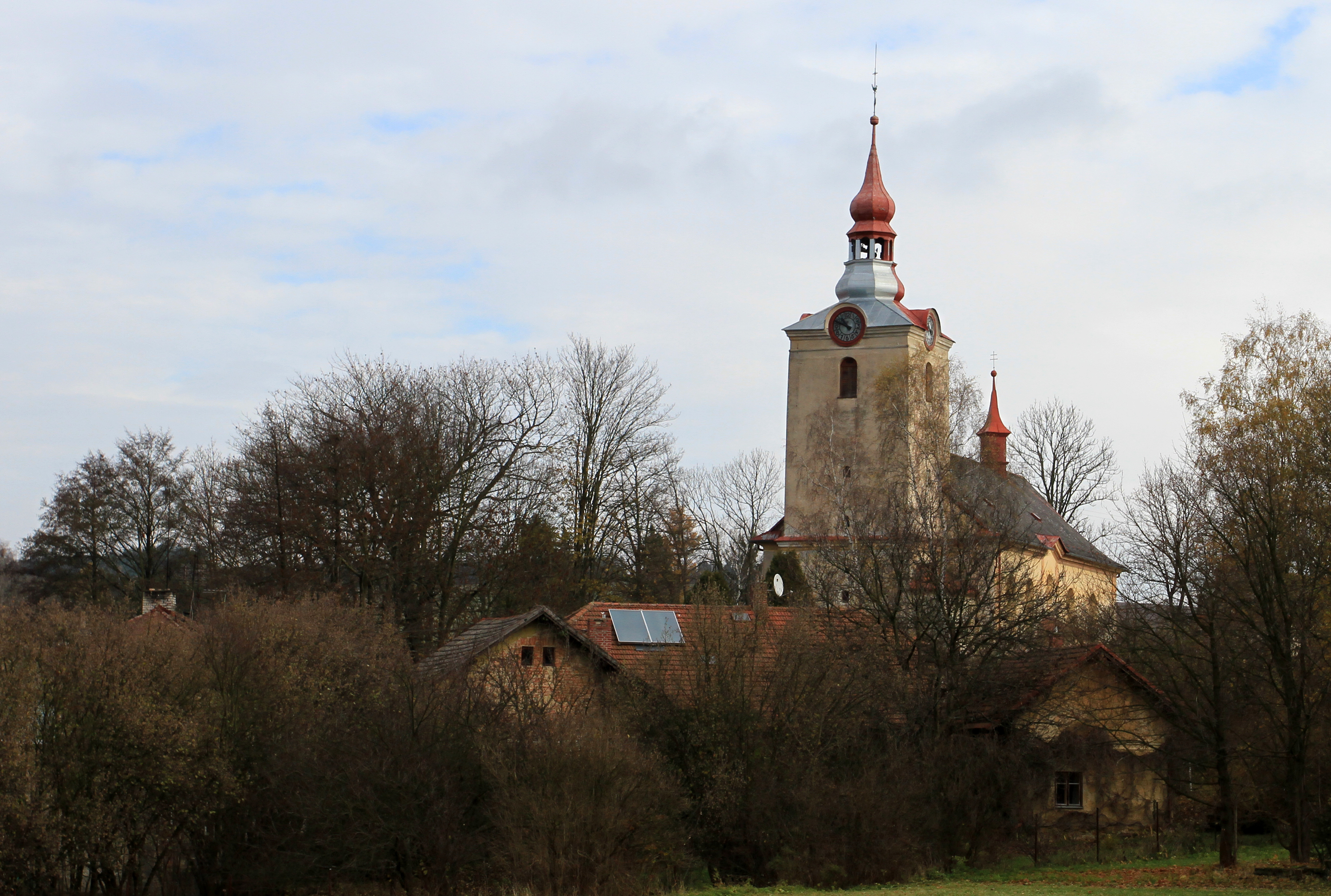
Church of Saint George

The main landmark of Dolní Čermná is the Church of Saint George. It was built in 1687–1690 and extended in 1859–1860. The tower dates from 1559.

== Notable people ==
- Jindřich Štyrský (1899–1942), artist
- Oldřich Marek (1911–1986), entomologist; attended a school here and later worked here as a teacher

== Twin towns – sister cities ==
Dolní Čermná is twinned with:

- Dzierżoniów, Poland
- Kazár, Hungary
- Liptovská Teplička, Slovakia
- Velykyi Bereznyi, Ukraine
