= Semanín =

- Municipality
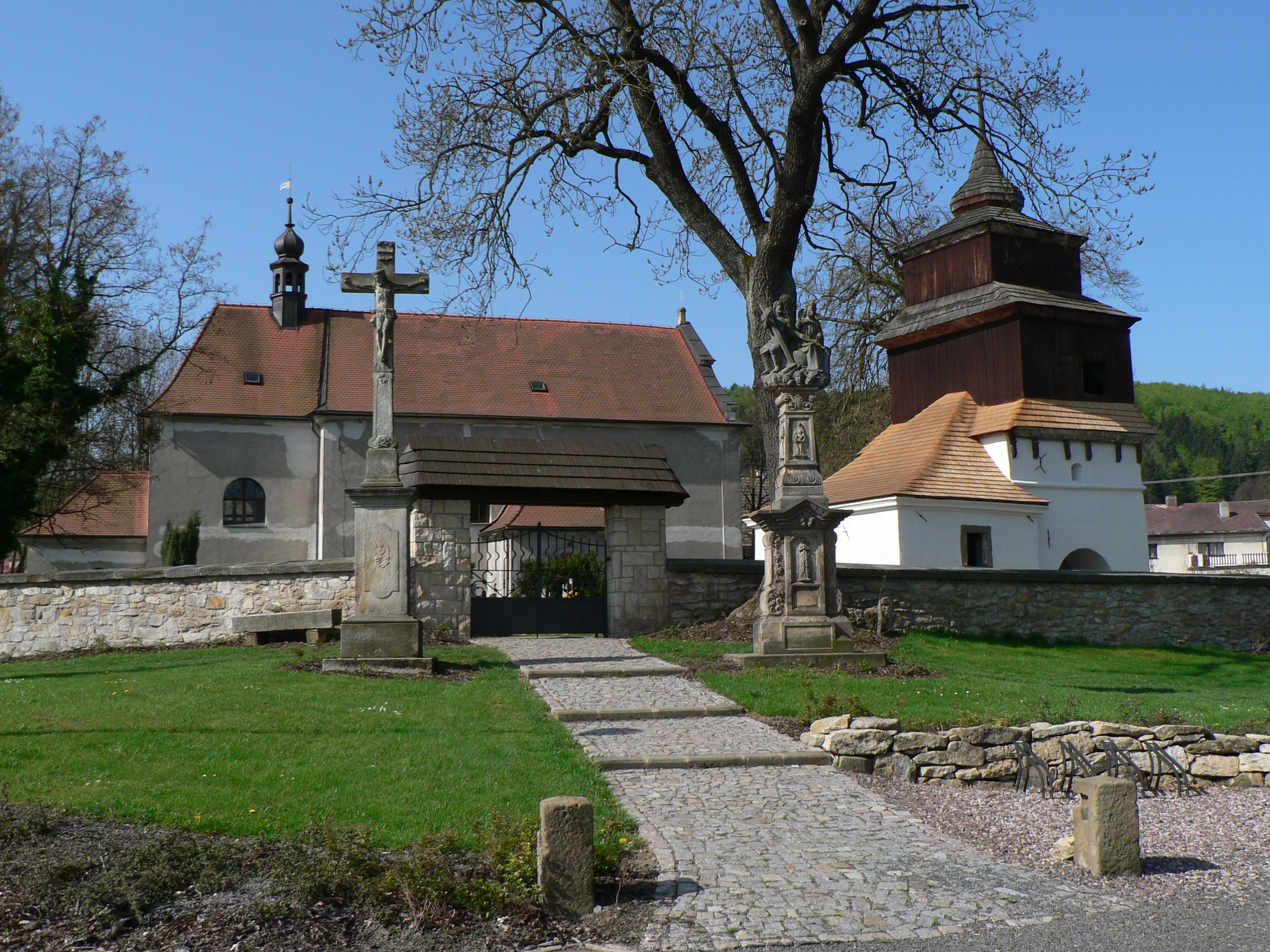
- Church of Saint Bartholomew

- Flag Coat of arms

- Location in the Czech Republic
- Coordinates: 49°52′10″N 16°27′11″E
- Country: Czech Republic
- Region: Pardubice
- District: Ústí nad Orlicí
- First mentioned: 1347

Area
  - Total: 8.80 km^{2} (3.40 sq mi)
- Elevation: 368 m (1,207 ft)

Population (2026-01-01)
  - Total: 656
  - Density: 74.5/km^{2} (193/sq mi)
- Time zone: UTC+1 (CET)
  - Summer (DST): UTC+2 (CEST)
- Postal code: 560 02
- Website: www.obecsemanin.cz

Semanín (German: Schirmdorf) is a municipality and village in Ústí nad Orlicí District in the Pardubice Region of the Czech Republic. It has about 700 inhabitants.

Semanín lies approximately 13 kilometres (8 mi) south of Ústí nad Orlicí, 52 kilometres (32 mi) east of Pardubice, and 148 kilometres (92 mi) east of Prague.

== Demographics ==
Historical population
Year	Pop.	±%
1869	866	—
1880	875	+1.0%
1890	870	−0.6%
1900	864	−0.7%
1910	882	+2.1%
1921	802	−9.1%
1930	732	−8.7%
1950	581	−20.6%
1961	610	+5.0%
1970	632	+3.6%
1980	587	−7.1%
1991	516	−12.1%
2001	550	+6.6%
2011	604	+9.8%
2021	602	−0.3%
Source: Censuses
