= Rybník (Ústí nad Orlicí District) =

- Municipality
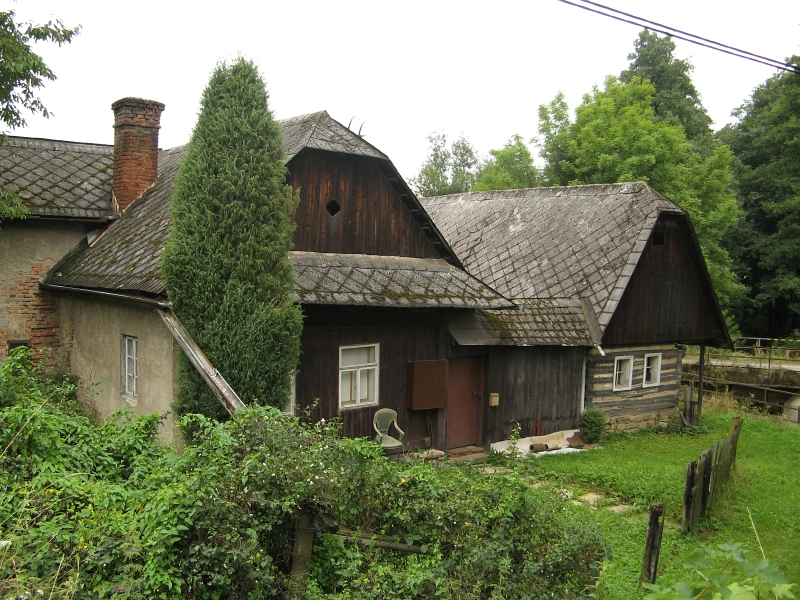
- Homestead No. 57, a cultural monument

- Flag Coat of arms

- Location in the Czech Republic
- Coordinates: 49°53′19″N 16°28′28″E
- Country: Czech Republic
- Region: Pardubice
- District: Ústí nad Orlicí
- First mentioned: 1292

Area
  - Total: 11.13 km^{2} (4.30 sq mi)
- Elevation: 385 m (1,263 ft)

Population (2026-01-01)
  - Total: 851
  - Density: 76.5/km^{2} (198/sq mi)
- Time zone: UTC+1 (CET)
  - Summer (DST): UTC+2 (CEST)
- Postal code: 560 02
- Website: www.rybnik.cz

Rybník is a municipality and village in Ústí nad Orlicí District in the Pardubice Region of the Czech Republic. It has about 900 inhabitants.

Rybník lies approximately 11 kilometres (7 mi) south-east of Ústí nad Orlicí, 53 km (33 mi) east of Pardubice, and 149 km (93 mi) east of Prague.

== Demographics ==
Historical population
| Year | Pop. | ±% |
|---|---|---|
| 1869 | 1,002 | — |
| 1880 | 925 | −7.7% |
| 1890 | 937 | +1.3% |
| 1900 | 934 | −0.3% |
| 1910 | 984 | +5.4% |
| 1921 | 991 | +0.7% |
| 1930 | 1,071 | +8.1% |
| 1950 | 1,085 | +1.3% |
| 1961 | 1,010 | −6.9% |
| 1970 | 916 | −9.3% |
| 1980 | 874 | −4.6% |
| 1991 | 746 | −14.6% |
| 2001 | 747 | +0.1% |
| 2011 | 808 | +8.2% |
| 2021 | 811 | +0.4% |
Source: Censuses
