= Třebovice =

- Municipality
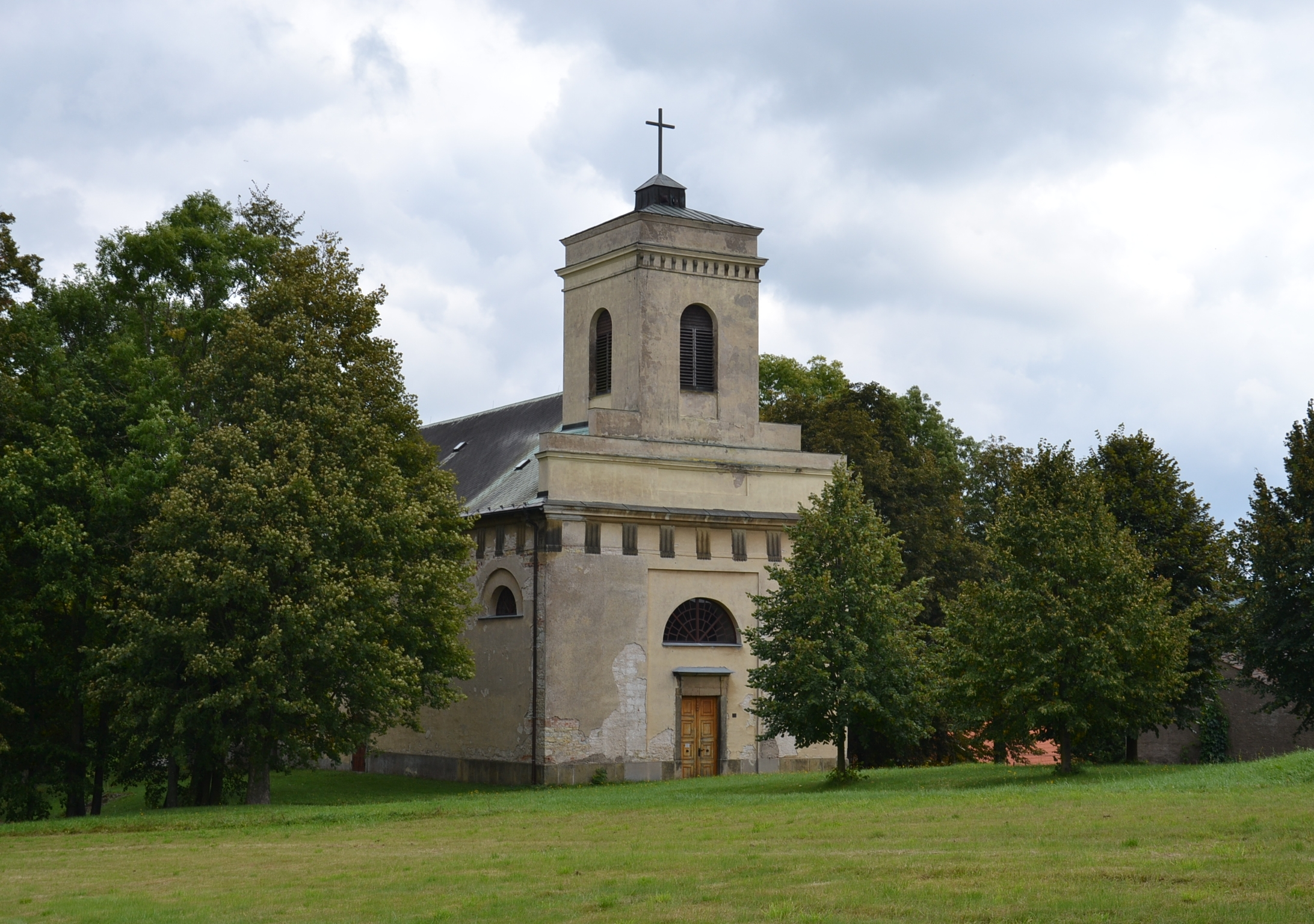
- Church of Saint George

- Flag Coat of arms

- Location in the Czech Republic
- Coordinates: 49°51′33″N 16°30′8″E
- Country: Czech Republic
- Region: Pardubice
- District: Ústí nad Orlicí
- First mentioned: 1304

Area
  - Total: 11.46 km^{2} (4.42 sq mi)
- Elevation: 415 m (1,362 ft)

Population (2026-01-01)
  - Total: 819
  - Density: 71.5/km^{2} (185/sq mi)
- Time zone: UTC+1 (CET)
  - Summer (DST): UTC+2 (CEST)
- Postal code: 561 24
- Website: www.trebovice.cz

Třebovice (German: Triebitz) is a municipality and village in Ústí nad Orlicí District in the Pardubice Region of the Czech Republic. It has about 800 inhabitants.

Třebovice lies approximately 14 kilometres (9 mi) south-east of Ústí nad Orlicí, 55 km (34 mi) east of Pardubice, and 151 km (94 mi) east of Prague.

== Demographics ==
Historical population
Year	Pop.	±%
1869	1,086	—
1880	1,156	+6.4%
1890	1,167	+1.0%
1900	1,163	−0.3%
1910	1,207	+3.8%
1921	1,138	−5.7%
1930	1,176	+3.3%
1950	943	−19.8%
1961	1,010	+7.1%
1970	951	−5.8%
1980	857	−9.9%
1991	796	−7.1%
2001	813	+2.1%
2011	824	+1.4%
2021	733	−11.0%
Source: Censuses

== Notable people ==
- Josef Schwarz (born 1941), German long jumper
