= Koclířov =

- Municipality
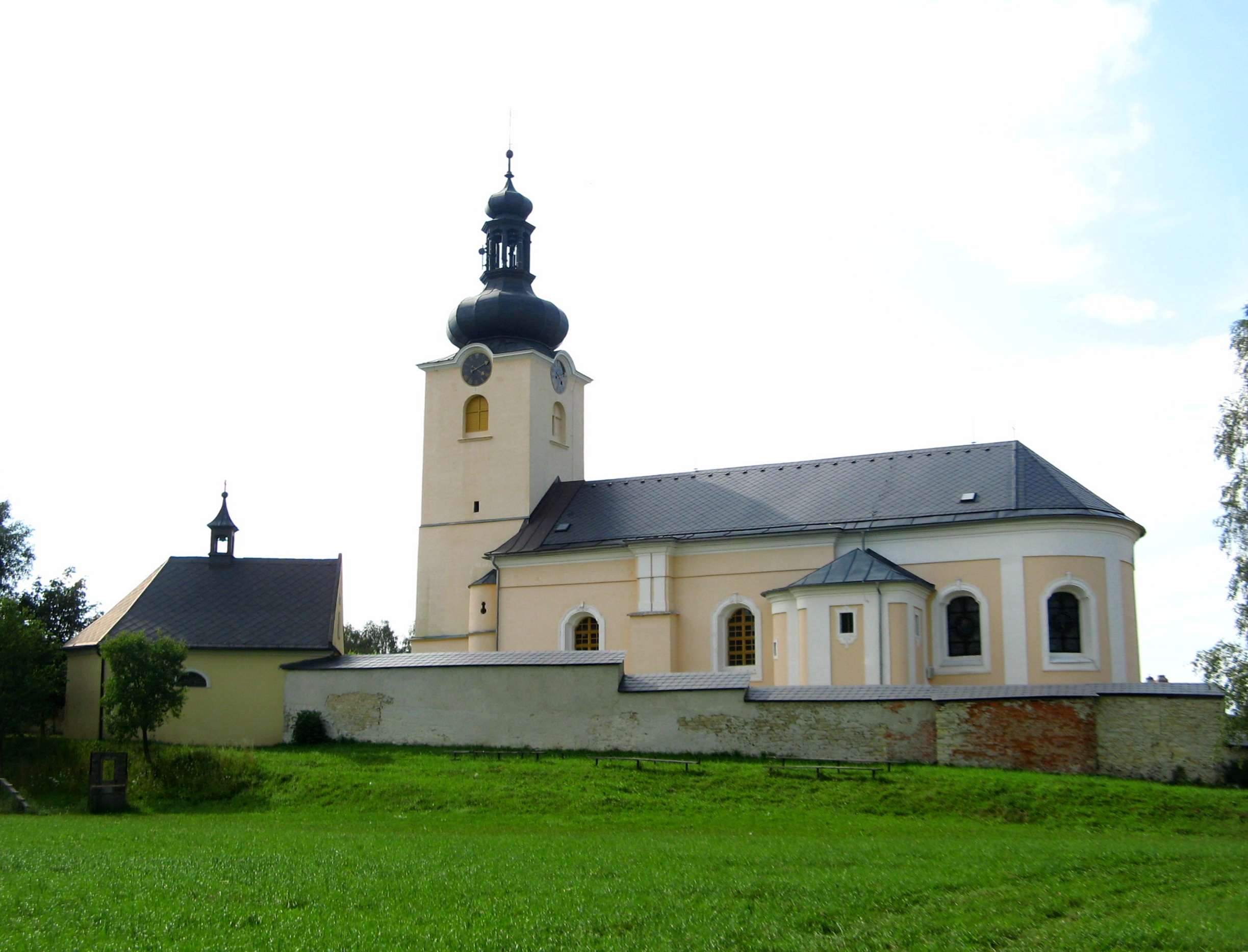
- Church of Saints James the Great and Philomena

- Flag Coat of arms

- Location in the Czech Republic
- Coordinates: 49°45′59″N 16°32′24″E
- Country: Czech Republic
- Region: Pardubice
- District: Svitavy
- First mentioned: 1347

Area
  - Total: 17.28 km^{2} (6.67 sq mi)
- Elevation: 502 m (1,647 ft)

Population (2026-01-01)
  - Total: 740
  - Density: 43/km^{2} (110/sq mi)
- Time zone: UTC+1 (CET)
  - Summer (DST): UTC+2 (CEST)
- Postal code: 569 11
- Website: www.koclirov.cz

Koclířov is a municipality and village in Svitavy District in the Pardubice Region of the Czech Republic. It has about 700 inhabitants.

Koclířov lies approximately 6 kilometres (4 mi) east of Svitavy, 63 km (39 mi) south-east of Pardubice, and 157 km (98 mi) east of Prague. The Třebovka River originates in the municipal territory.

== Administrative division ==
Koclířov consists of two municipal parts (in brackets population according to the 2021 census):

- Koclířov (651)
- Hřebeč (20)

== Demographics ==
Historical population
| Year | Pop. | ±% |
|---|---|---|
| 1869 | 1,604 | — |
| 1880 | 1,714 | +6.9% |
| 1890 | 1,682 | −1.9% |
| 1900 | 1,623 | −3.5% |
| 1910 | 1,653 | +1.8% |
| 1921 | 1,578 | −4.5% |
| 1930 | 1,564 | −0.9% |
| 1950 | 824 | −47.3% |
| 1961 | 1,059 | +28.5% |
| 1970 | 886 | −16.3% |
| 1980 | 832 | −6.1% |
| 1991 | 682 | −18.0% |
| 2001 | 660 | −3.2% |
| 2011 | 709 | +7.4% |
| 2021 | 671 | −5.4% |
Source: Censuses
