= Opatov (Svitavy District) =

- Municipality
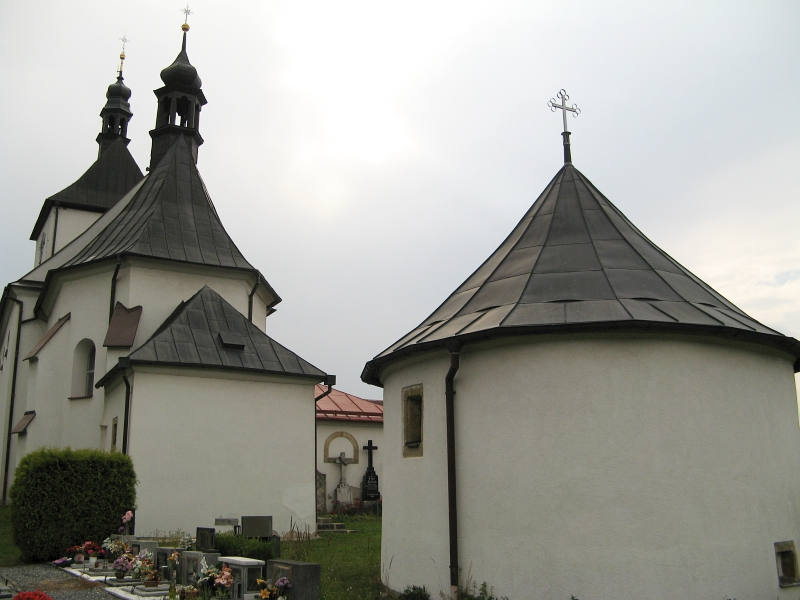
- Church of Saint Anthony the Great

- Location in the Czech Republic
- Coordinates: 49°49′30″N 16°30′17″E
- Country: Czech Republic
- Region: Pardubice
- District: Svitavy
- First mentioned: 1347

Area
  - Total: 29.73 km^{2} (11.48 sq mi)
- Elevation: 438 m (1,437 ft)

Population (2026-01-01)
  - Total: 1,103
  - Density: 37.10/km^{2} (96.09/sq mi)
- Time zone: UTC+1 (CET)
  - Summer (DST): UTC+2 (CEST)
- Postal code: 569 12
- Website: www.obecopatov.cz

Opatov (German: Abtsdorf) is a municipality and village in Svitavy District in the Pardubice Region of the Czech Republic. It has about 1,100 inhabitants.

== Etymology ==
The name is derived from the Czech word opat ('abbot'), meaning "abbot's property". It refers to the fact that the village was initially a property of the monastery in Litomyšl.

== Geography ==
Opatov is located about 8 kilometres (5 mi) north of Svitavy and 56 km (35 mi) southeast of Pardubice. It lies in the Svitavy Uplands. The highest point is at 550 m (1,804 ft) above sea level. The Třebovka River flows through the municipality.

The municipal territory is rich in fishponds, the largest of which are Hvězda and Nový rybník. These are important ornithological sites.

== History ==
The first written mention of Opatov is from 1347. It was founded around 1247 by Abbot Herrman from the monastery in Litomyšl as a village of German settlers. In the 14th century, fishponds were established around Opatov. From 1364 until the Thirty Years' War, Opatov was a market town. During these wars, part of Opatov was looted and burned down. In 1771–1772, the village was hit by famine. A large fire badly damaged the central part of the village in 1841. In 1846, the railway was opened.

Until World War II, Germans formed majority of the population. After World War II, the German-speaking inhabitants were expelled. The hamlets of Královec and Nový Rybník, which were administratively part of Opatov, disappeared as a result. the municipality was then partly resettled by Czechs.

== Demographics ==
Historical population

| Year | Pop. | ±% |
|---|---|---|
| 1869 | 2,206 | — |
| 1880 | 2,231 | +1.1% |
| 1890 | 2,150 | −3.6% |
| 1900 | 2,021 | −6.0% |
| 1910 | 2,090 | +3.4% |

| Year | Pop. | ±% |
|---|---|---|
| 1921 | 1,981 | −5.2% |
| 1930 | 1,911 | −3.5% |
| 1950 | 1,267 | −33.7% |
| 1961 | 1,330 | +5.0% |
| 1970 | 1,252 | −5.9% |

| Year | Pop. | ±% |
|---|---|---|
| 1980 | 1,168 | −6.7% |
| 1991 | 1,115 | −4.5% |
| 2001 | 1,097 | −1.6% |
| 2011 | 1,163 | +6.0% |
| 2021 | 1,126 | −3.2% |

Source: Censuses

== Economy ==
Opatov is known for the Opatov Photovoltaics Plant.

== Transport ==
The I/43 road (from Brno and Svitavy to the Czech–Polish border in Králíky) runs through the municipality.

Opatov is located on the railway line Česká Třebová–Letovice.

== Sights ==
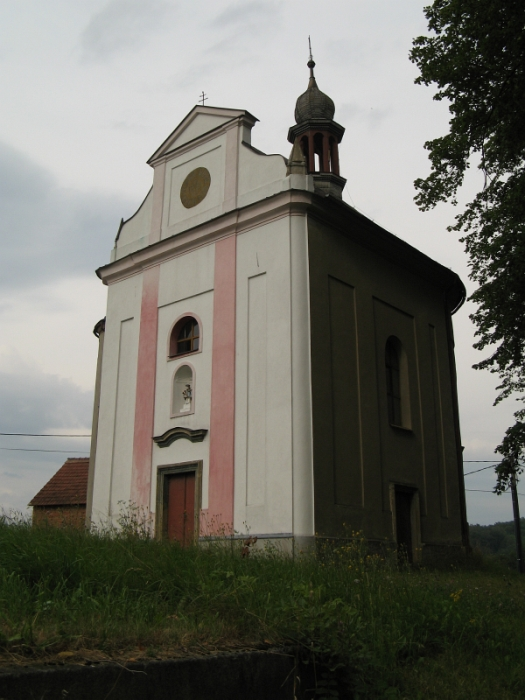
Chapel of Saint John of Nepomuk

The main landmark of Opatov is the Church of Saint Anthony the Great. It was founded in the first half of the 13th century, but was rebuilt several times. It has a massive Renaissance tower with a Romanesque core from 1240.

In the northern part of Opatov is the Chapel of Saint John of Nepomuk. It was built in the Baroque style in 1722 and is considered an artistically valuable building. In front of the chapel is a statue of Saint John of Nepomuk from 1720.

== Twin towns – sister cities ==
Opatov is twinned with:

- Drezzo (Colverde), Italy
