= Slatina (Svitavy District) =

- Municipality
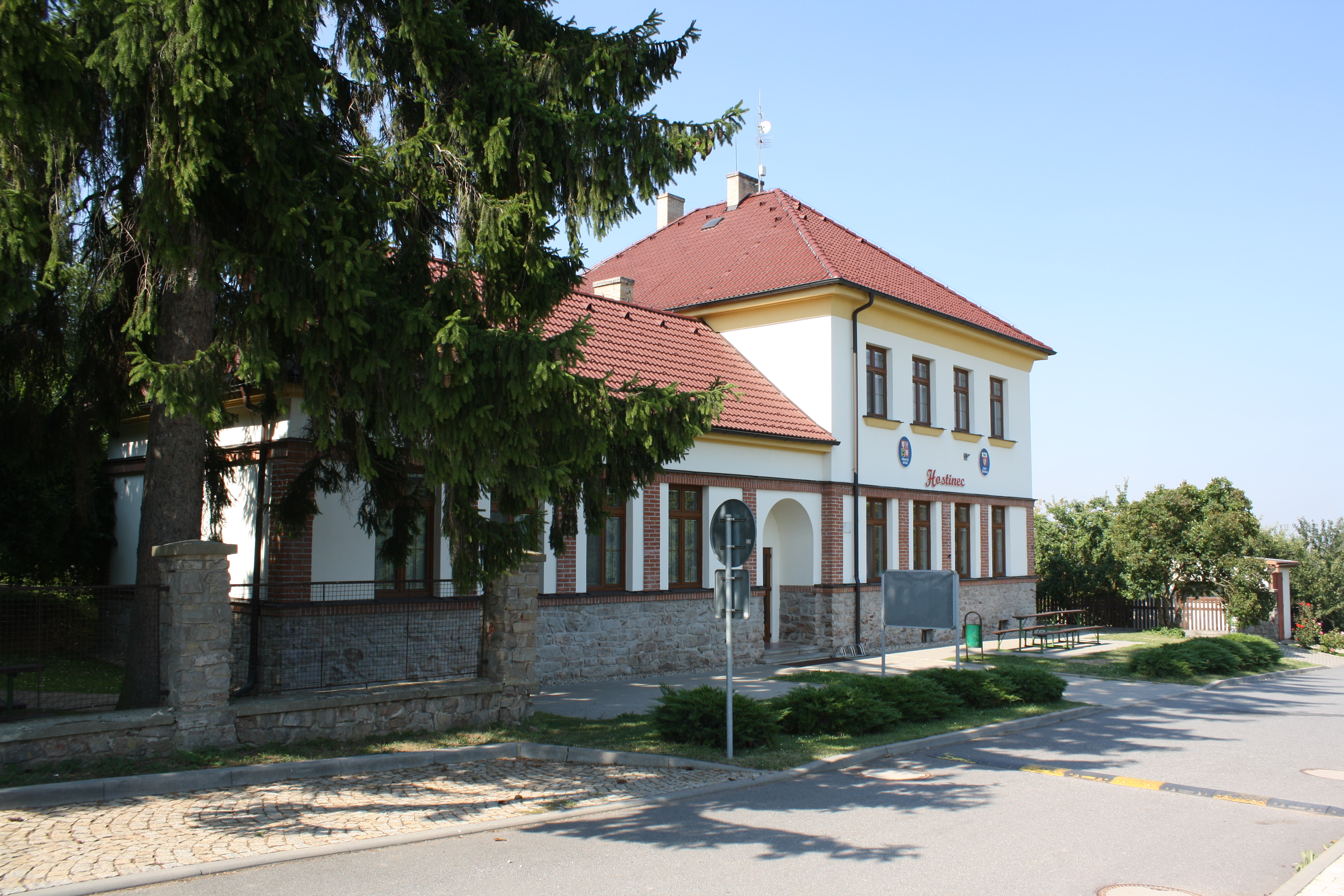
- Municipal office

- Flag Coat of arms

- Location in the Czech Republic
- Coordinates: 49°37′47″N 16°36′28″E
- Country: Czech Republic
- Region: Pardubice
- District: Svitavy
- First mentioned: 1573

Area
  - Total: 3.99 km^{2} (1.54 sq mi)
- Elevation: 453 m (1,486 ft)

Population (2026-01-01)
  - Total: 166
  - Density: 41.6/km^{2} (108/sq mi)
- Time zone: UTC+1 (CET)
  - Summer (DST): UTC+2 (CEST)
- Postal code: 569 43
- Website: www.obec-slatina.cz

Slatina (German: Schlettau) is a municipality and village in Svitavy District in the Pardubice Region of the Czech Republic. It has about 200 inhabitants.

Slatina lies approximately 18 kilometres (11 mi) south-east of Svitavy, 75 km (47 mi) south-east of Pardubice, and 165 km (103 mi) east of Prague.

== Administrative division ==
Slatina consists of two municipal parts (in brackets population according to the 2021 census):

- Slatina (147)
- Březinka (0)

== Demographics ==
Historical population
Year	Pop.	±%
1869	309	—
1880	315	+1.9%
1890	328	+4.1%
1900	321	−2.1%
1910	351	+9.3%
1921	357	+1.7%
1930	306	−14.3%
1950	240	−21.6%
1961	218	−9.2%
1970	194	−11.0%
1980	168	−13.4%
1991	114	−32.1%
2001	113	−0.9%
2011	127	+12.4%
2021	147	+15.7%
Source: Censuses
