= Dětřichov u Moravské Třebové =

- Municipality
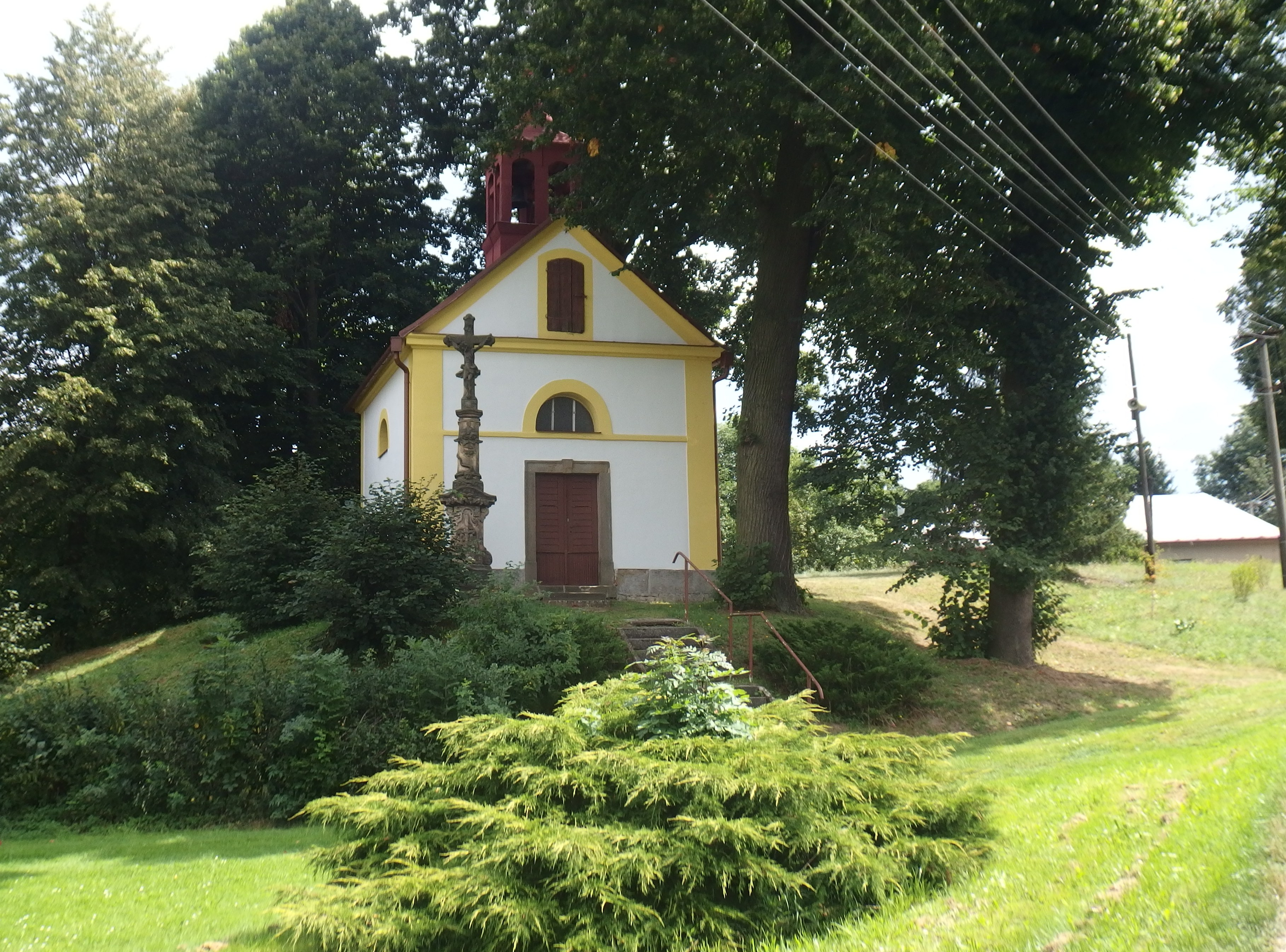
- Chapel of Saint Anne

- Flag Coat of arms

- Location in the Czech Republic
- Coordinates: 49°47′14″N 16°42′38″E
- Country: Czech Republic
- Region: Pardubice
- District: Svitavy
- First mentioned: 1321

Area
  - Total: 5.91 km^{2} (2.28 sq mi)
- Elevation: 505 m (1,657 ft)

Population (2026-01-01)
  - Total: 185
  - Density: 31.3/km^{2} (81.1/sq mi)
- Time zone: UTC+1 (CET)
  - Summer (DST): UTC+2 (CEST)
- Postal code: 571 01
- Website: www.detrichovumt.cz

Dětřichov u Moravské Třebové (German: Dittersdorf) is a municipality and village in Svitavy District in the Pardubice Region of the Czech Republic. It has about 200 inhabitants.

Dětřichov u Moravské Třebové lies approximately 19 kilometres (12 mi) east of Svitavy, 74 km (46 mi) east of Pardubice, and 169 km (105 mi) east of Prague.

== History ==
The first written mention of Dětřichov u Moravské Třebové is from 1321. The originally Slavic settlement was gradually settled by Germans.

During World War II, the municipality was annexed by Nazi Germany. A small concentration camp for pregnant forced laborers was established there. After the war, the German population was expelled.

== Demographics ==
Historical population
Year	Pop.	±%
1869	531	—
1880	500	−5.8%
1890	476	−4.8%
1900	457	−4.0%
1910	425	−7.0%
1921	429	+0.9%
1930	451	+5.1%
1950	304	−32.6%
1961	256	−15.8%
1970	251	−2.0%
1980	252	+0.4%
1991	225	−10.7%
2001	219	−2.7%
2011	194	−11.4%
2021	180	−7.2%
Source: Censuses
