= Česká Třebová =

- Town
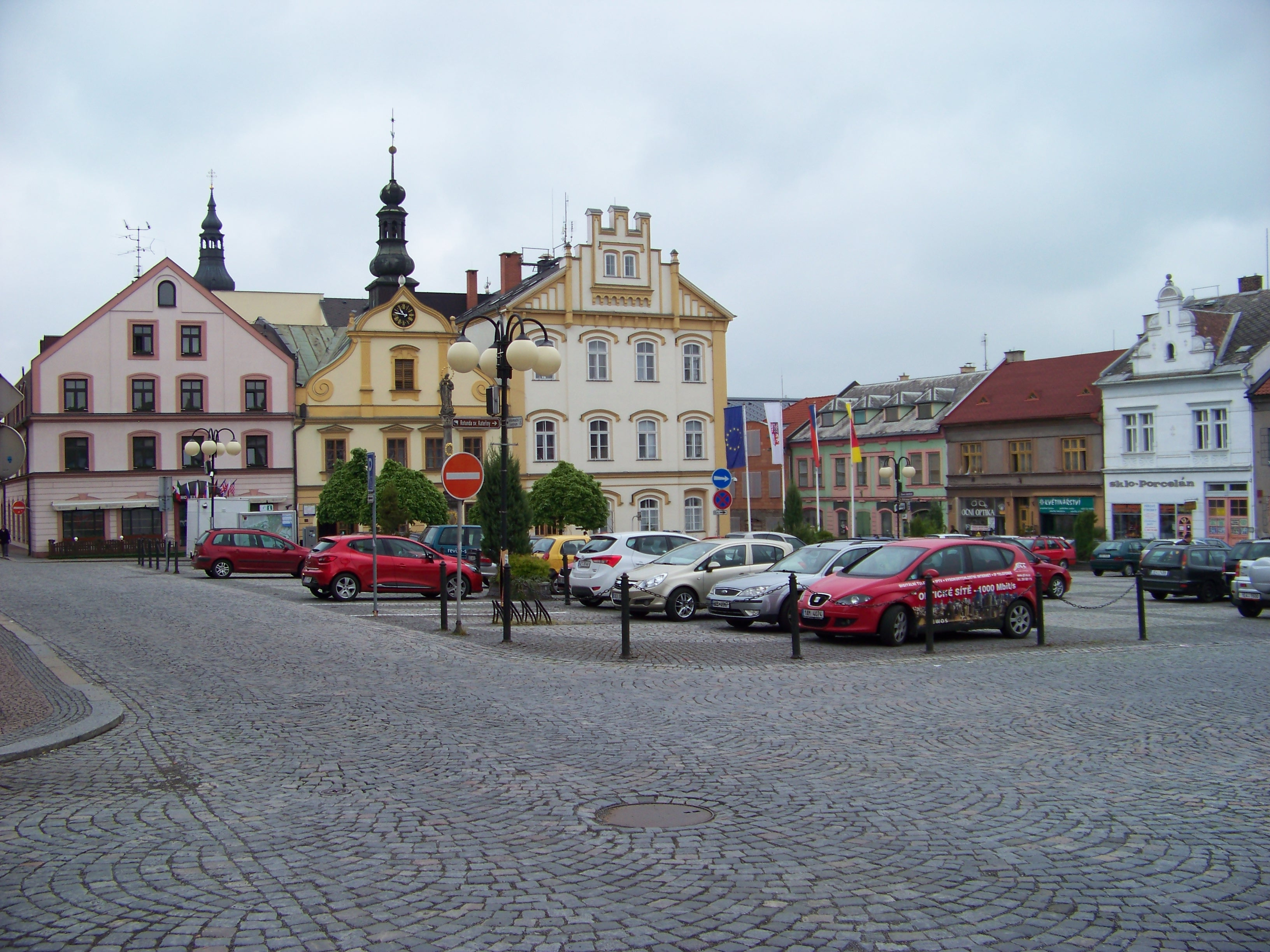
- The square Staré náměstí

- Flag Coat of arms

- Location in the Czech Republic
- Coordinates: 49°54′7″N 16°26′50″E
- Country: Czech Republic
- Region: Pardubice
- District: Ústí nad Orlicí
- First mentioned: 1278

Government
  - Mayor: Zdeněk Řehák

Area
  - Total: 41.01 km^{2} (15.83 sq mi)
- Elevation: 375 m (1,230 ft)

Population (2026-01-01)
  - Total: 14,982
  - Density: 365.3/km^{2} (946.2/sq mi)
- Time zone: UTC+1 (CET)
  - Summer (DST): UTC+2 (CEST)
- Postal code: 560 02
- Website: www.ceska-trebova.cz

Česká Třebová (Czech pronunciation: [ˈtʃɛskaː ˈtr̝̊ɛbovaː]; German: Böhmisch Trübau) is a town in Ústí nad Orlicí District in the Pardubice Region of the Czech Republic. It has about 15,000 inhabitants. The town is located on the Třebovka River in the Svitavy Uplands and is known as a railway junction.

Česká Třebová was founded in the second half 13th century. The historic town centre is well preserved and is protected as an urban monument zone.

== Administrative division ==
Česká Třebová consists of six municipal parts (in brackets population according to the 2021 census):

- Česká Třebová (10,154)
- Kozlov (120)
- Lhotka (1,681)
- Parník (2,589)
- Skuhrov (206)
- Svinná (116)

== Etymology ==
The name Třebová is derived from the Old Czech verb triebiti, which meant 'chop down', 'clear'. The name refers to the founding of settlements on the site of forest that had to be cleared first. First the name of the Třebovka River was created, then it was transferred to the settlements along the river. The prefix česká (meaning 'Bohemian') was added to distinguish it from Moravská Třebová.

== Geography ==
Česká Třebová is located about 8 kilometres (5 mi) south of Ústí nad Orlicí and 49 km (30 mi) southeast of Pardubice. It lies in the Svitavy Uplands. The highest point is the hill Palice at 613 m (2,011 ft) above sea level. The town is situated in the valley of the Třebovka River.

== History ==
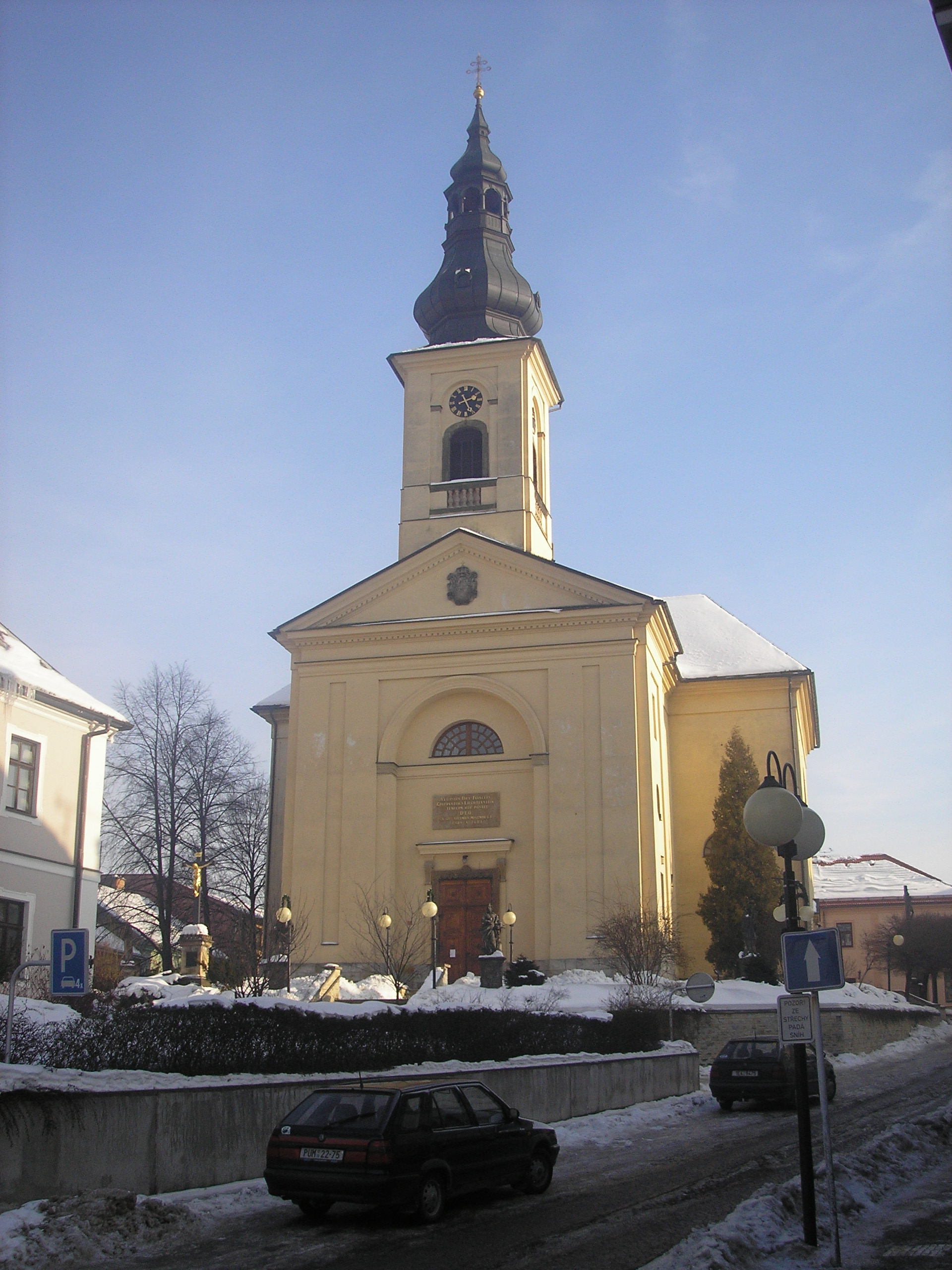
Church of Saint James the Great

The first written mention of Česká Třebová is from 1278. It was founded during the reign of King Ottokar II as a town with regular ground plan and rectangular square in its centre.

In 1304, King Wenceslaus II gave it to the Zbraslav Monastery and later, in the 14th century, the town belonged to the bishops of Litomyšl. In the 15th and 16th centuries, the town prospered. It was owned by various noble families, including the Pernštejn family and the Bohdanecký of Hodkov family, which supported textile crafts and had the Renaissance bell tower built.

Due to the Thirty Years' War, plagues and fires, it became poor and insignificant. This state lasted until the middle of the 19th century. In 1845, the railway from Prague to Olomouc via Česká Třebová was built and in 1849, the railway from Brno to Česká Třebová was built. This greatly aided the town development, helped to create new jobs and attract new people.

== Demographics ==
Historical population

Year	Pop.	±%
1869	8,288	—
1880	7,607	−8.2%
1890	8,205	+7.9%
1900	9,725	+18.5%
1910	13,028	+34.0%

Year	Pop.	±%
1921	13,256	+1.8%
1930	14,587	+10.0%
1950	13,676	−6.2%
1961	14,470	+5.8%
1970	15,488	+7.0%

Year	Pop.	±%
1980	16,107	+4.0%
1991	17,091	+6.1%
2001	17,036	−0.3%
2011	15,653	−8.1%
2021	14,866	−5.0%

Source: Censuses

== Economy ==
The main employer based in the town is the company CZ LOKO, which is engaged in the production, repair and modernisation of locomotives. It has more than 600 employees. The second largest company is Korado, a manufacturer of radiators.

== Transport ==
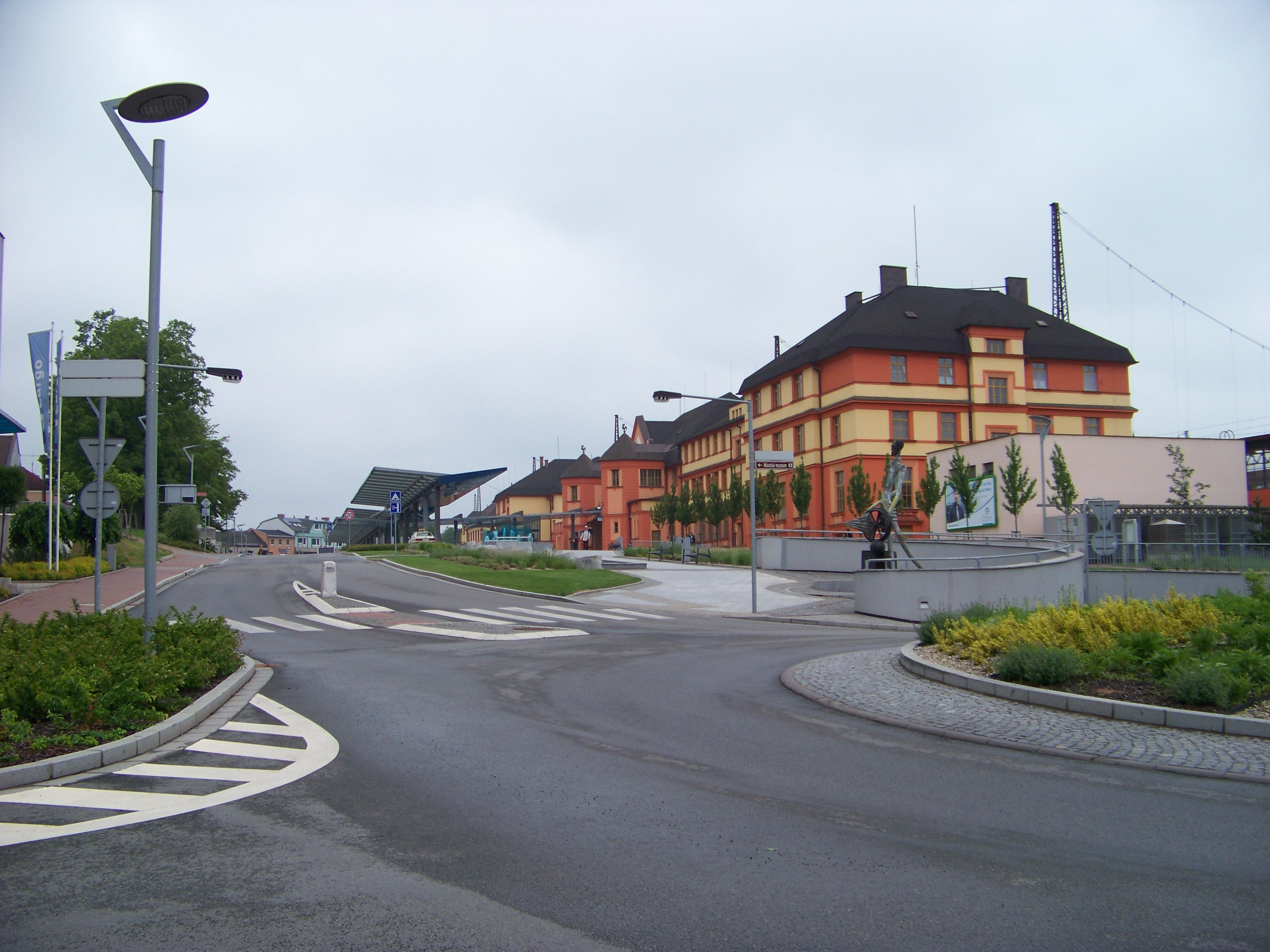
The square Náměstí Jana Pernera with the bus and railway stations

The I/14 road, which connects Liberec with Hradec Králové and Pardubice regions, runs through the town.

Česká Třebová railway station is located on the major railway lines Prague–Olomouc (further continuing to Ostrava and Poland, Slovakia, and Luhačovice) and Prague–Brno.

== Sport ==
Česká Třebová is home to a 4th league ice hockey club, HC Kohouti Česká Třebová, which plays at the Na Skále stadium with a capacity of 1,000 spectators.

== Sights ==
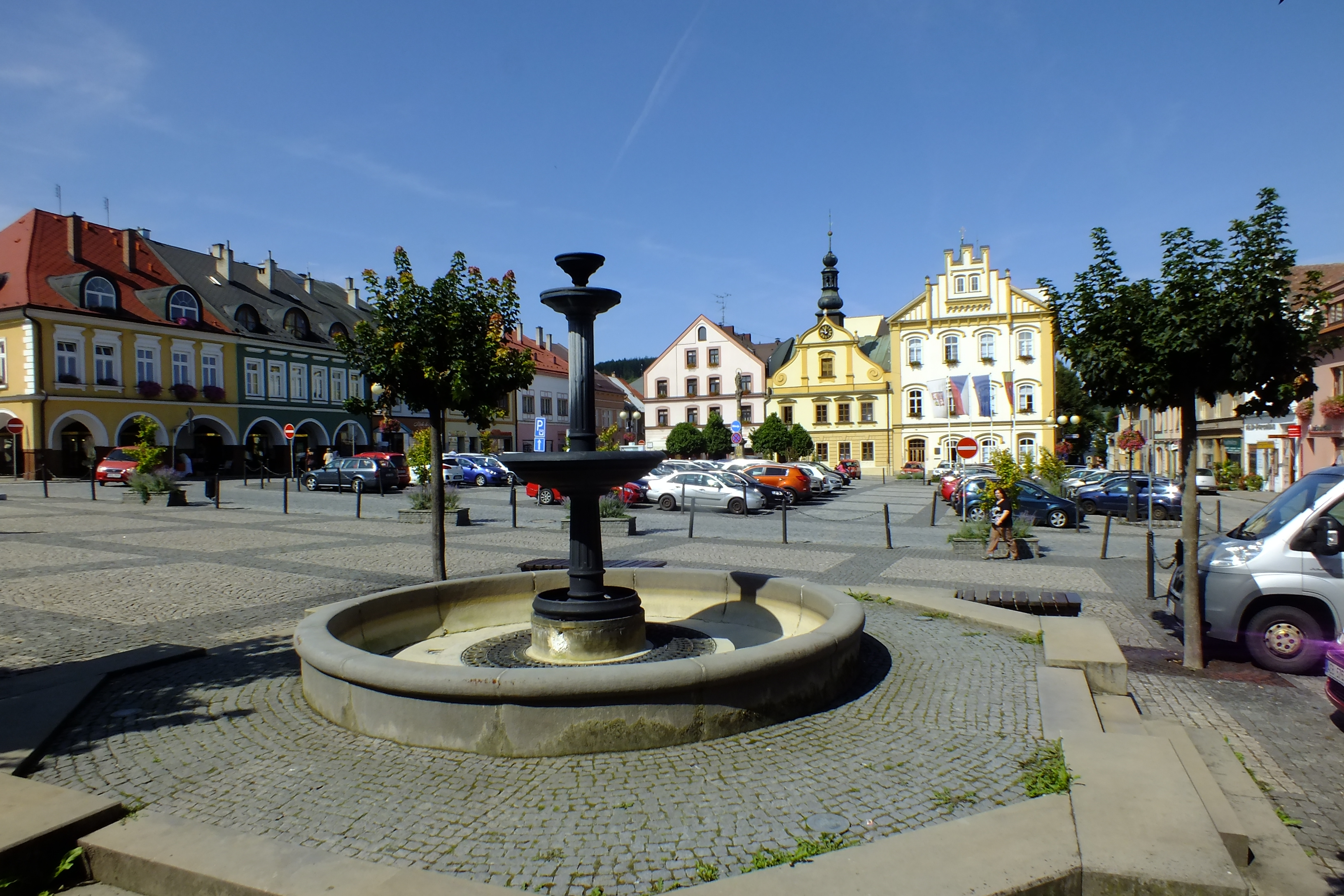
Staré náměstí

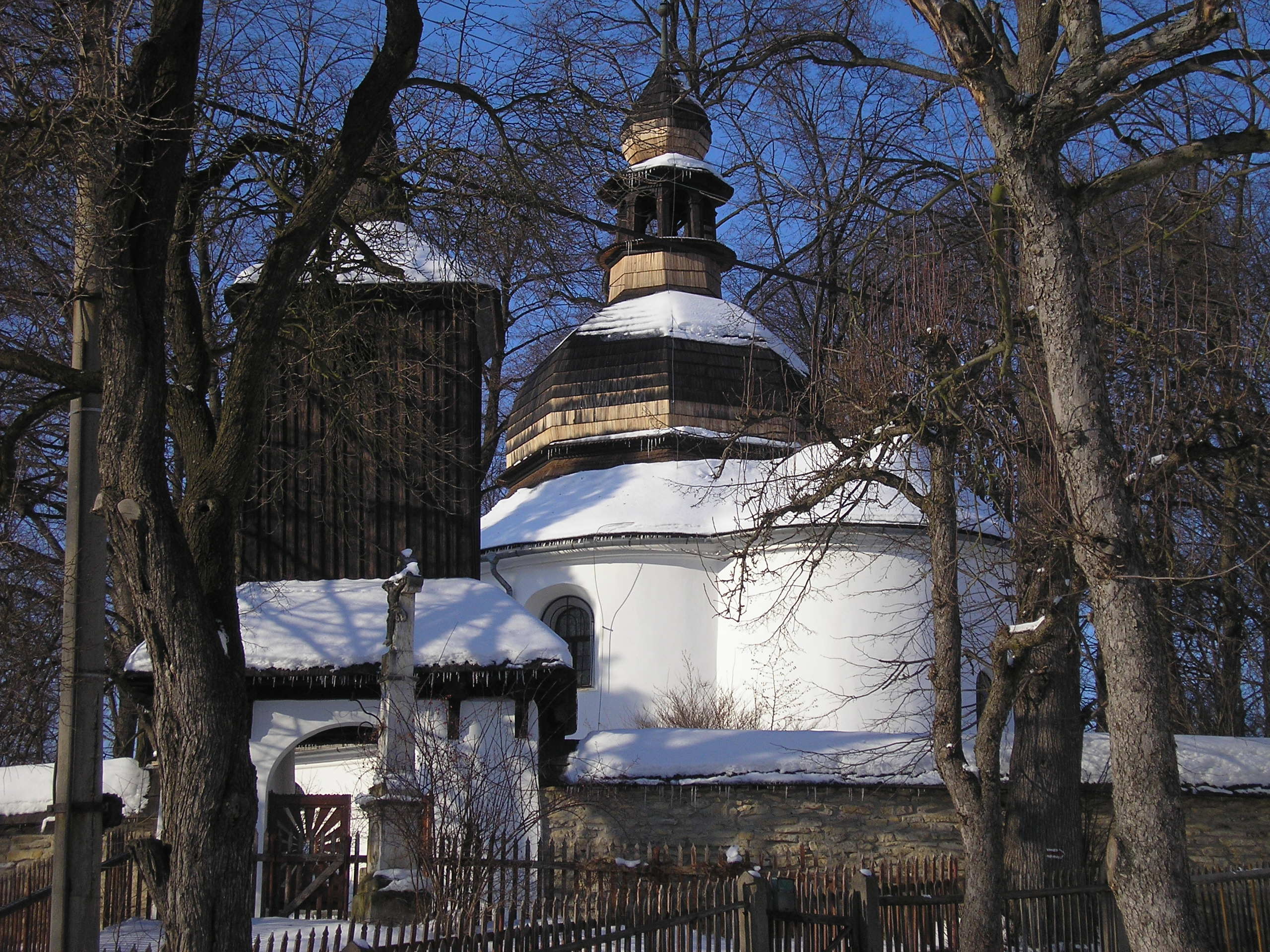
Chapel of Saint Catherine with the wooden bell tower

The historic centre is located around the square Staré náměstí. The main landmark of the square is the town hall, probably built in 1547. In the middle of the square is the Marian column from 1706. The Church of Saint James the Great was built in the Neoclassical style in 1794–1801. There are several valuable late Baroque statues around the church, created between 1712 and 1719. The deanery next to the church was built in 1783–1786. The church is connected to the square by two parallel streets, Klácelova and Hýblova. In Klácelova street is the Neoclassical house No. 11 from 1804, which houses the town museum and the tourist information centre.

The Chapel of Saint Catherine was built in the early 13th century and is older than the town. The originally Romanesque rotunda was mixed with other styles during several reconstructions.

Kozlov is known for the cottage which Max Švabinský often visited and painted here. Today there is an exposition of the town museum. In Kozlov there is also the wooden Chapel of the Virgin mary from 1753. Above Kozlov on the Kozlovský hill with an altitude of 601 metres (1,972 ft) is a 55 metres (180 ft)-high observation tower.

== Notable people ==
- František Klácel (1808–1882), author and philosopher
- Max Švabinský (1873–1962), painter; worked here
- Fritz Freisler (1881–1955), Austrian screenwriter and film director
- Zdeňka Baldová (1885–1958), actress
- Helen Hughes (1928–2013), Australian economist; lived here until 1939
- Libuše Dušková (born 1930), linguist

== Twin towns – sister cities ==
Česká Třebová is twinned with:

- Agrate Brianza, Italy
- Horní Lhota, Czech Republic
- Oława, Poland
- Svit, Slovakia
