= Opatov Photovoltaics Plant =

Photovoltaic power station in the Czech Republic

- Country: Czech Republic
- Coordinates: 49°50′31″N 16°29′24″E
- Status: Operational
- Commission date: 2006

Solar farm
- Type: Standard PV

Power generation
- Nameplate capacity: 60 kW

The Opatov Photovoltaics Plant (Czech: Fotovoltaická elektrárna Opatov) is a photovoltaic power station in the Czech Republic commissioned in 2006. The plant is located in Opatov, Svitavy District. It has an installed capacity of 60 kW. It was shortly the largest photovoltaic plant in the country.
