= Dětřichov (Svitavy District) =

- Municipality
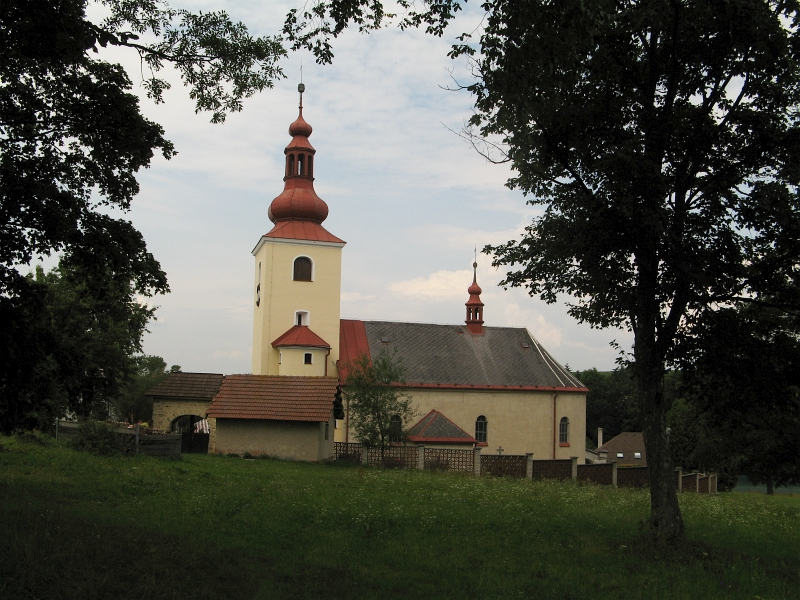
- Church of Saints Peter and Paul

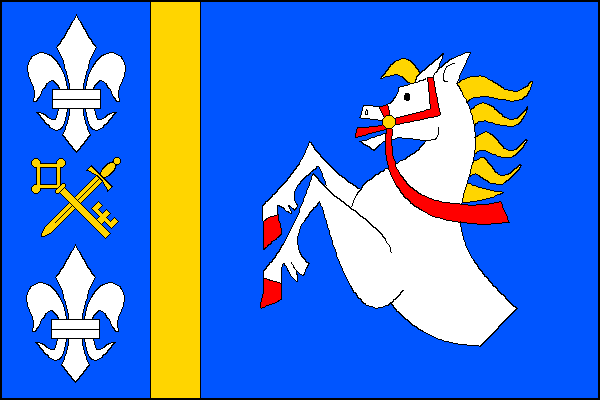
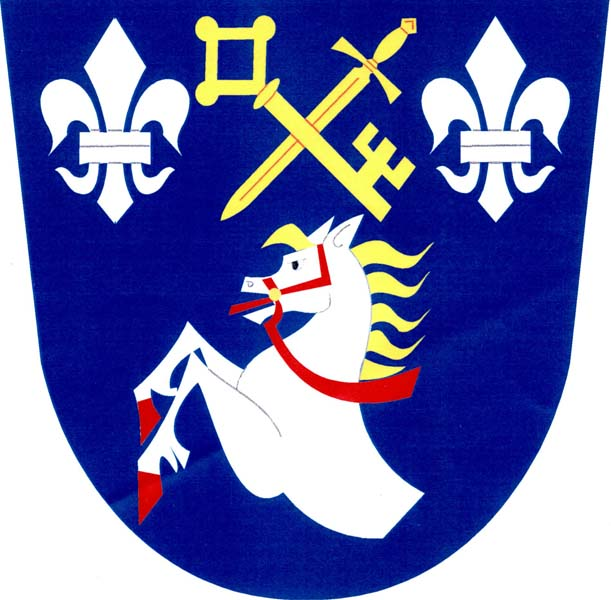
- Flag Coat of arms

- Location in the Czech Republic
- Coordinates: 49°48′0″N 16°31′58″E
- Country: Czech Republic
- Region: Pardubice
- District: Svitavy
- First mentioned: 1167

Area
  - Total: 15.70 km^{2} (6.06 sq mi)
- Elevation: 505 m (1,657 ft)

Population (2026-01-01)
  - Total: 391
  - Density: 24.9/km^{2} (64.5/sq mi)
- Time zone: UTC+1 (CET)
  - Summer (DST): UTC+2 (CEST)
- Postal code: 568 02
- Website: www.obecdetrichov.cz

Dětřichov (German: Dittersdorf) is a municipality and village in Svitavy District in the Pardubice Region of the Czech Republic. It has about 400 inhabitants.

== Etymology ==
The initial Latin name of the village was Theodriciuilla. It was derived from the personal German name Dietrich (Czech: Dětřich), Latinised as Theodericus, meaning "Dietrich's village". The Czech and German names were created by translation. The German name later appeared as Dittersdorf.

== Geography ==
Dětřichov is located about 6 kilometres (4 mi) northeast of Svitavy and 59 km (37 mi) southeast of Pardubice. It lies in the Svitavy Uplands. The highest point is a nameless hill at 641 m (2,103 ft) above sea level. The upper course of the Třebovka River flows through the western part of the municipality.

== History ==
The first written mention of Dětřichov is from 1167. In 1278, the area was colonised by German settlers. The hamlet of Vysoké Pole, nowadays a local part of Dětřichov, was founded in 1777. After World War II, the German population was expelled and partially replaced by Czechs.

== Demographics ==
Historical population

Year	Pop.	±%
1869	1,453	—
1880	1,429	−1.7%
1890	1,372	−4.0%
1900	1,321	−3.7%
1910	1,281	−3.0%

Year	Pop.	±%
1921	1,104	−13.8%
1930	1,009	−8.6%
1950	380	−62.3%
1961	328	−13.7%
1970	298	−9.1%

Year	Pop.	±%
1980	299	+0.3%
1991	301	+0.7%
2001	311	+3.3%
2011	312	+0.3%
2021	330	+5.8%

Source: Censuses

== Transport ==
The I/35 road (the section from Hradec Králové to Svitavy, part of the European route E442) runs along the southwestern municipal border.

== Sights ==
The main landmark of Dětřichov is the Church of Saints Peter and Paul. Its existence was first documented in 1350. In 1793, it was rebuilt into its current Baroque form.
