= Opatov (Jihlava District) =

- Municipality
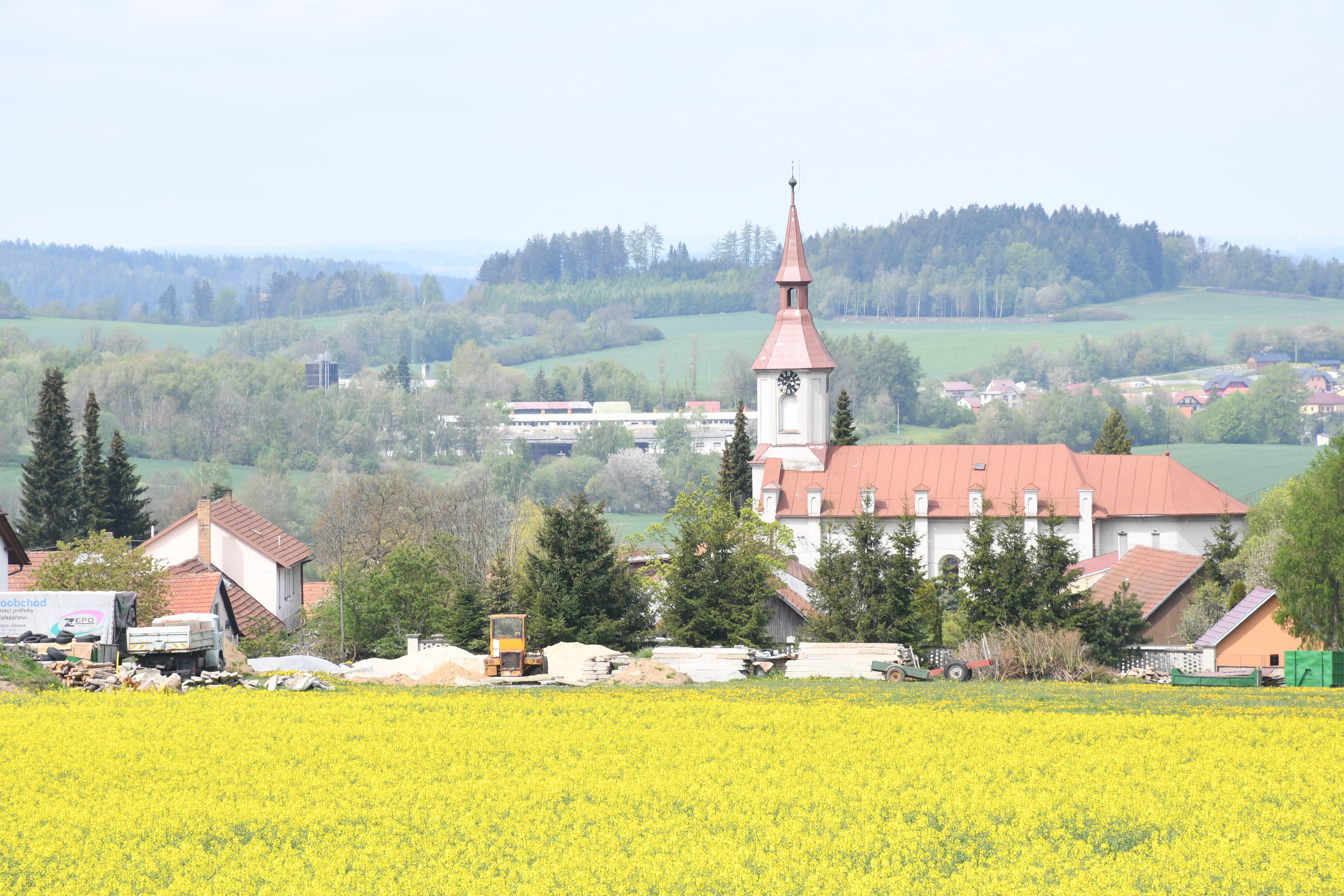
- View towards the Evangelical church

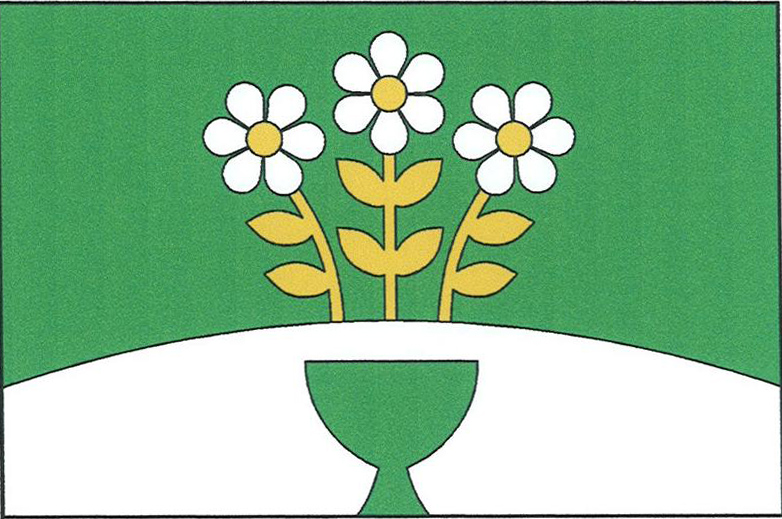
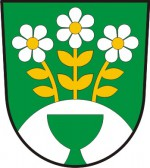
- Flag Coat of arms

- Location in the Czech Republic
- Coordinates: 49°25′52″N 15°23′40″E
- Country: Czech Republic
- Region: Vysočina
- District: Jihlava
- First mentioned: 1303

Area
  - Total: 6.75 km^{2} (2.61 sq mi)
- Elevation: 650 m (2,130 ft)

Population (2026-01-01)
  - Total: 196
  - Density: 29.0/km^{2} (75.2/sq mi)
- Time zone: UTC+1 (CET)
  - Summer (DST): UTC+2 (CEST)
- Postal code: 588 05
- Website: www.opatov.info

Opatov (Czech pronunciation: [ˈopatof]) is a municipality and village in Jihlava District in the Vysočina Region of the Czech Republic. It has about 200 inhabitants.

Opatov lies approximately 16 kilometres (10 mi) west of Jihlava and 100 km (62 mi) south-east of Prague.

== History ==
The first written mention of Opatov is from 1303.

== Demographics ==
Historical population
Year	Pop.	±%
1869	578	—
1880	518	−10.4%
1890	499	−3.7%
1900	496	−0.6%
1910	482	−2.8%
1921	495	+2.7%
1930	401	−19.0%
1950	286	−28.7%
1961	274	−4.2%
1970	227	−17.2%
1980	177	−22.0%
1991	174	−1.7%
2001	207	+19.0%
2011	186	−10.1%
2021	198	+6.5%
Source: Censuses
