= Dlouhá Třebová =

- Municipality
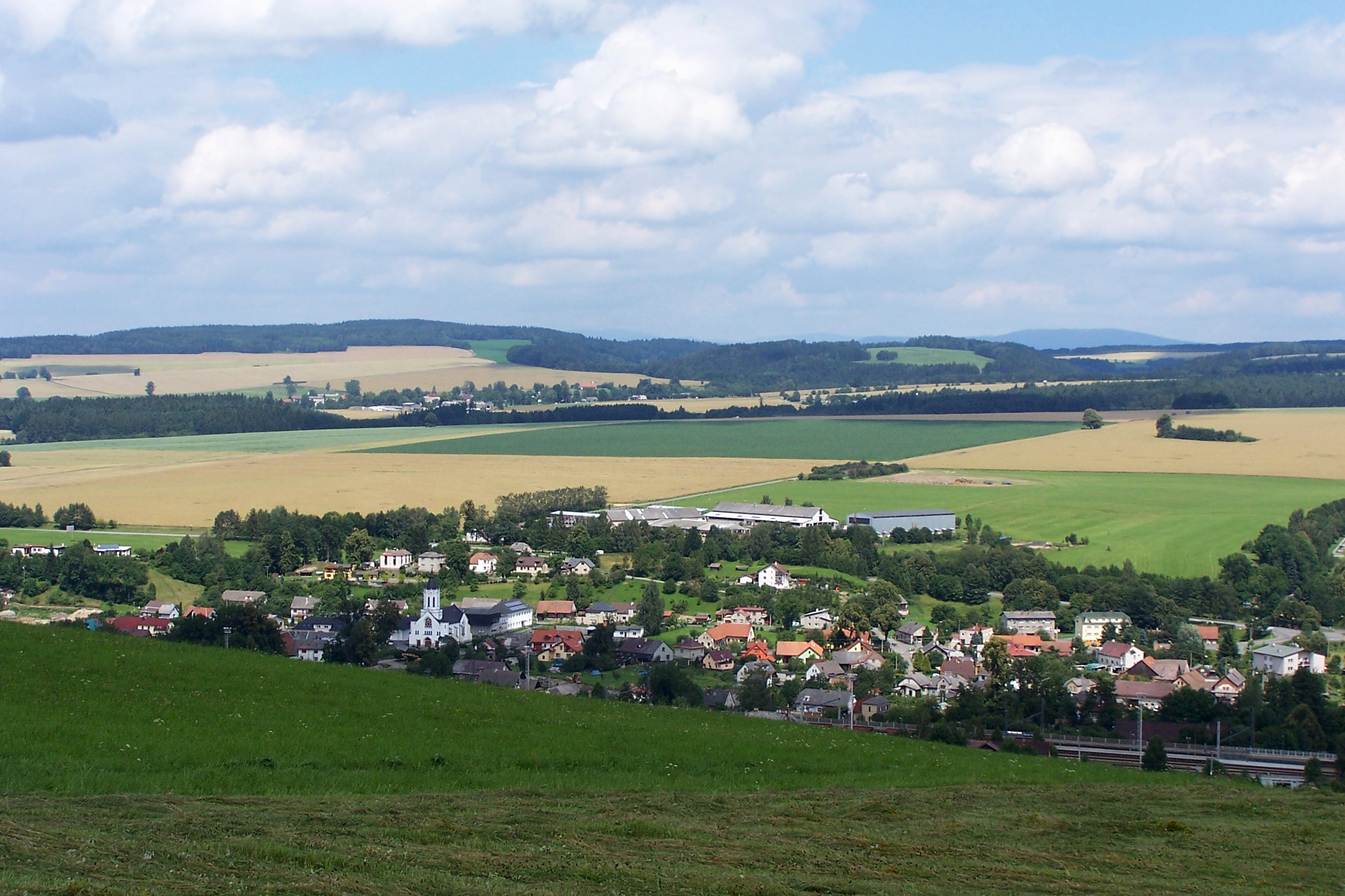
- View from the west

- Flag Coat of arms

- Location in the Czech Republic
- Coordinates: 49°56′26″N 16°25′24″E
- Country: Czech Republic
- Region: Pardubice
- District: Ústí nad Orlicí
- First mentioned: 1304

Area
  - Total: 10.44 km^{2} (4.03 sq mi)
- Elevation: 345 m (1,132 ft)

Population (2026-01-01)
  - Total: 1,298
  - Density: 124.3/km^{2} (322.0/sq mi)
- Time zone: UTC+1 (CET)
  - Summer (DST): UTC+2 (CEST)
- Postal code: 561 17
- Website: dlouhatrebova.cz

Dlouhá Třebová (German: Langentriebe) is a municipality and village in Ústí nad Orlicí District in the Pardubice Region of the Czech Republic. It has about 1,300 inhabitants.

== History ==
The first written mention of Dlouhá Třebová is from 1304.

== Demographics ==
Historical population
Year	Pop.	±%
1869	1,484	—
1880	1,409	−5.1%
1890	1,320	−6.3%
1900	1,383	+4.8%
1910	1,479	+6.9%
1921	1,465	−0.9%
1930	1,491	+1.8%
1950	1,232	−17.4%
1961	1,215	−1.4%
1970	1,143	−5.9%
1980	1,122	−1.8%
1991	1,196	+6.6%
2001	1,227	+2.6%
2011	1,223	−0.3%
2021	1,256	+2.7%
Source: Censuses

== Sights ==
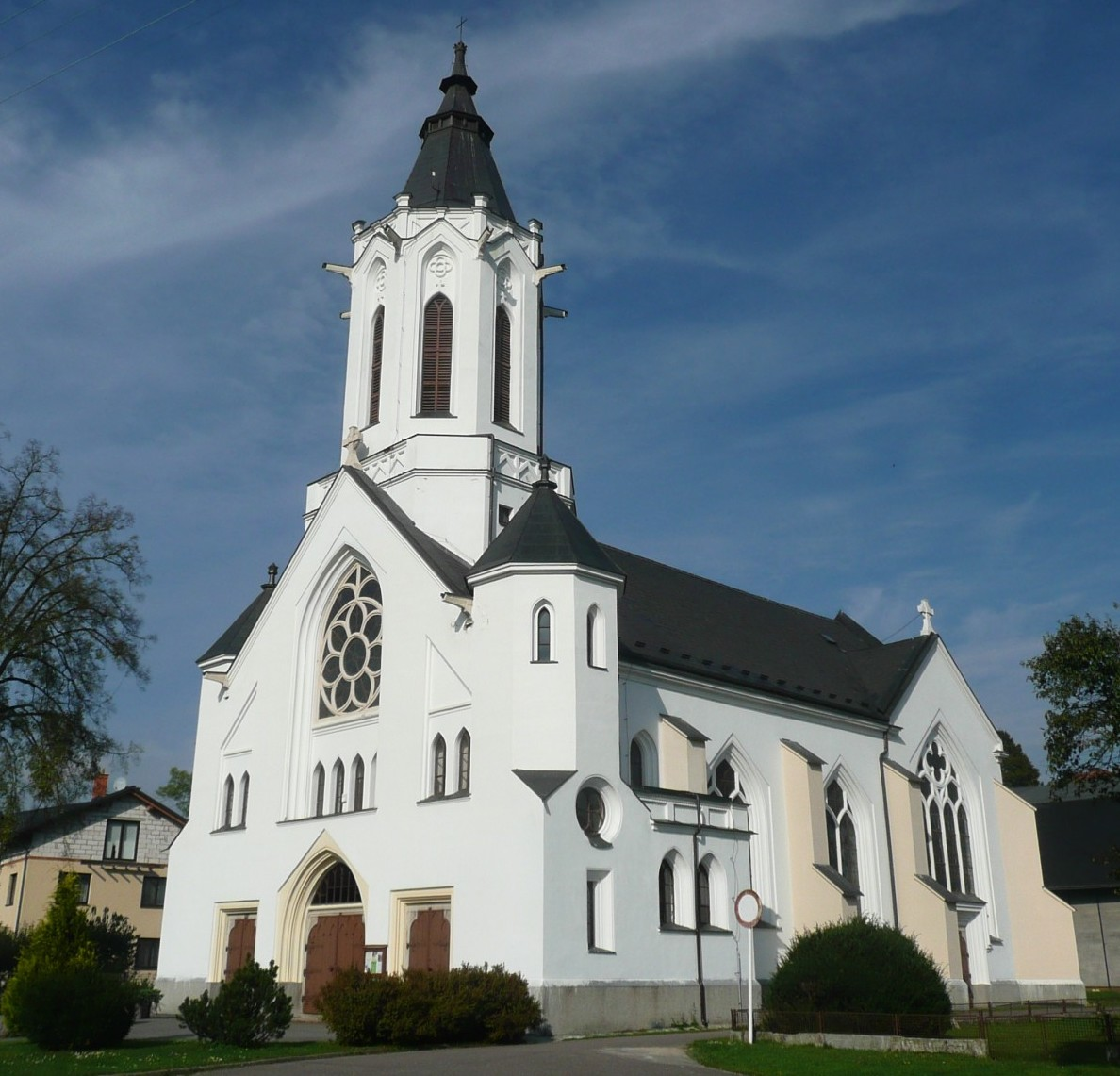
Church of Saint Procopius

The main landmark of Dlouhá Třebová is the Church of Saint Procopius. It was built in 1906.
