= Ústí nad Orlicí =

Town in Pardubice Region, Czech Republic

- Town
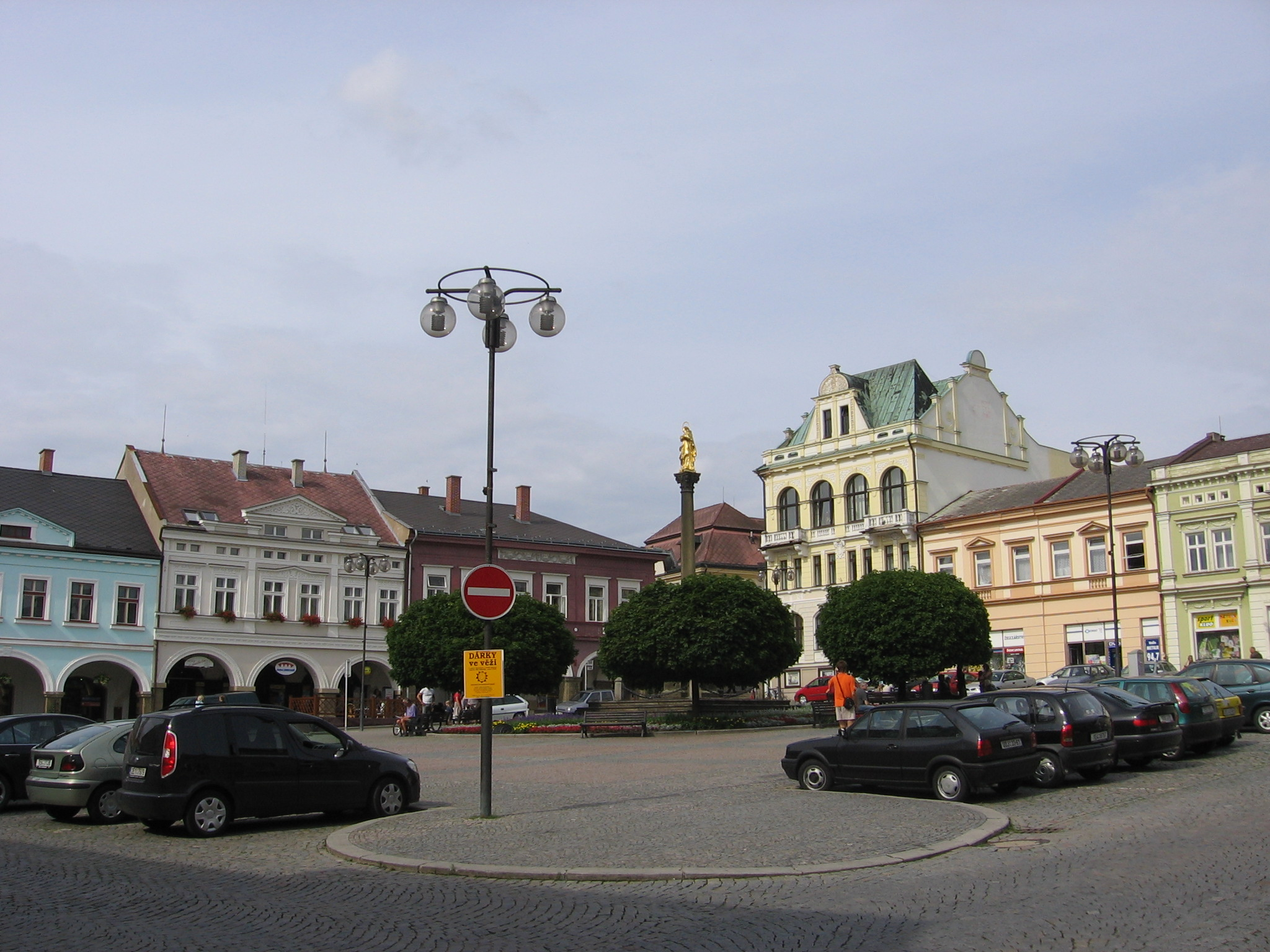
- The square Mírové náměstí

- Flag Coat of arms

- Location in the Czech Republic
- Coordinates: 49°58′26″N 16°23′37″E
- Country: Czech Republic
- Region: Pardubice
- District: Ústí nad Orlicí
- First mentioned: 1285

Government
  - Mayor: Petr Hájek

Area
  - Total: 36.37 km^{2} (14.04 sq mi)
- Elevation: 340 m (1,120 ft)

Population (2026-01-01)
  - Total: 13,988
  - Density: 384.6/km^{2} (996.1/sq mi)
- Time zone: UTC+1 (CET)
  - Summer (DST): UTC+2 (CEST)
- Postal codes: 562 01, 562 03, 562 04, 562 06
- Website: www.ustinadorlici.cz

Ústí nad Orlicí (Czech pronunciation: [ˈuːsciː ˈnat orlɪtsiː]; German: Wildenschwert) is a town in the Pardubice Region of the Czech Republic. It has about 14,000 inhabitants. The town is located at the confluence of the Tichá Orlice and Třebovka rivers, in the Svitavy Uplands. The historic town centre is well preserved and is protected as an urban monument zone.

== Administrative division ==
Ústí nad Orlicí consists of five municipal parts (in brackets population according to the 2021 census):

- Ústí nad Orlicí (8,978)
- Černovír (295)
- Dolní Houžovec (52)
- Horní Houžovec (48)
- Hylváty (3,017)
- Kerhartice (888)
- Knapovec (326)
- Oldřichovice (354)

== Etymology ==
The name Ústí literally means 'mouth (of the river)' in Czech. It refers to its location at the confluence of rivers. The German name Wildenschwert was created by a distortion of the original German name Wilhelmswerd, which referred to one of colonisers on the area, Wilhelm von Dürnholz, and meant "Wilhelm's promontory".

== Geography ==
Ústí nad Orlicí is located about 44 kilometres (27 mi) east of Pardubice. It lies in the Svitavy Uplands. The highest point is the Strážný hill at 584 m (1,916 ft) above sea level. The town is situated at the confluence of the Tichá Orlice and Třebovka rivers.

=== Climate ===
Climate data for Ústí nad Orlicí (1991–2020)
| Month | Jan | Feb | Mar | Apr | May | Jun | Jul | Aug | Sep | Oct | Nov | Dec | Year |
|---|---|---|---|---|---|---|---|---|---|---|---|---|---|
| Record high °C (°F) | 15.3 (59.5) | 16.0 (60.8) | 21.8 (71.2) | 28.3 (82.9) | 32.7 (90.9) | 35.1 (95.2) | 36.6 (97.9) | 37.4 (99.3) | 32.5 (90.5) | 24.7 (76.5) | 18.7 (65.7) | 13.5 (56.3) | 37.4 (99.3) |
| Mean daily maximum °C (°F) | 1.0 (33.8) | 2.9 (37.2) | 7.4 (45.3) | 14.1 (57.4) | 19.0 (66.2) | 22.3 (72.1) | 24.5 (76.1) | 24.6 (76.3) | 18.9 (66.0) | 12.6 (54.7) | 6.5 (43.7) | 1.9 (35.4) | 13.0 (55.4) |
| Daily mean °C (°F) | −1.7 (28.9) | −0.6 (30.9) | 3.1 (37.6) | 8.5 (47.3) | 13.1 (55.6) | 16.4 (61.5) | 18.1 (64.6) | 17.7 (63.9) | 12.8 (55.0) | 8.2 (46.8) | 3.7 (38.7) | −0.6 (30.9) | 8.2 (46.8) |
| Mean daily minimum °C (°F) | −4.4 (24.1) | −3.7 (25.3) | −0.8 (30.6) | 3.0 (37.4) | 7.4 (45.3) | 10.9 (51.6) | 12.5 (54.5) | 12.2 (54.0) | 8.4 (47.1) | 4.8 (40.6) | 1.2 (34.2) | −2.9 (26.8) | 4.1 (39.4) |
| Record low °C (°F) | −24.5 (−12.1) | −22.7 (−8.9) | −18.0 (−0.4) | −9.6 (14.7) | −2.3 (27.9) | 0.9 (33.6) | 1.7 (35.1) | 4.1 (39.4) | −2.6 (27.3) | −7.7 (18.1) | −13.5 (7.7) | −24.6 (−12.3) | −24.6 (−12.3) |
| Average precipitation mm (inches) | 54.3 (2.14) | 43.2 (1.70) | 48.9 (1.93) | 38.9 (1.53) | 70.9 (2.79) | 85.6 (3.37) | 103.4 (4.07) | 75.3 (2.96) | 62.1 (2.44) | 47.8 (1.88) | 50.1 (1.97) | 56.3 (2.22) | 736.6 (29.00) |
| Average precipitation days (≥ 1.0 mm) | 11.0 | 8.7 | 10.2 | 7.4 | 9.8 | 10.4 | 11.1 | 8.7 | 8.4 | 8.7 | 9.3 | 11.0 | 114.8 |
| Mean monthly sunshine hours | 50.3 | 76.5 | 124.5 | 190.5 | 224.1 | 228.6 | 237.7 | 236.3 | 165.6 | 105.8 | 46.1 | 37.3 | 1,723.4 |
Source: NOAA

== History ==
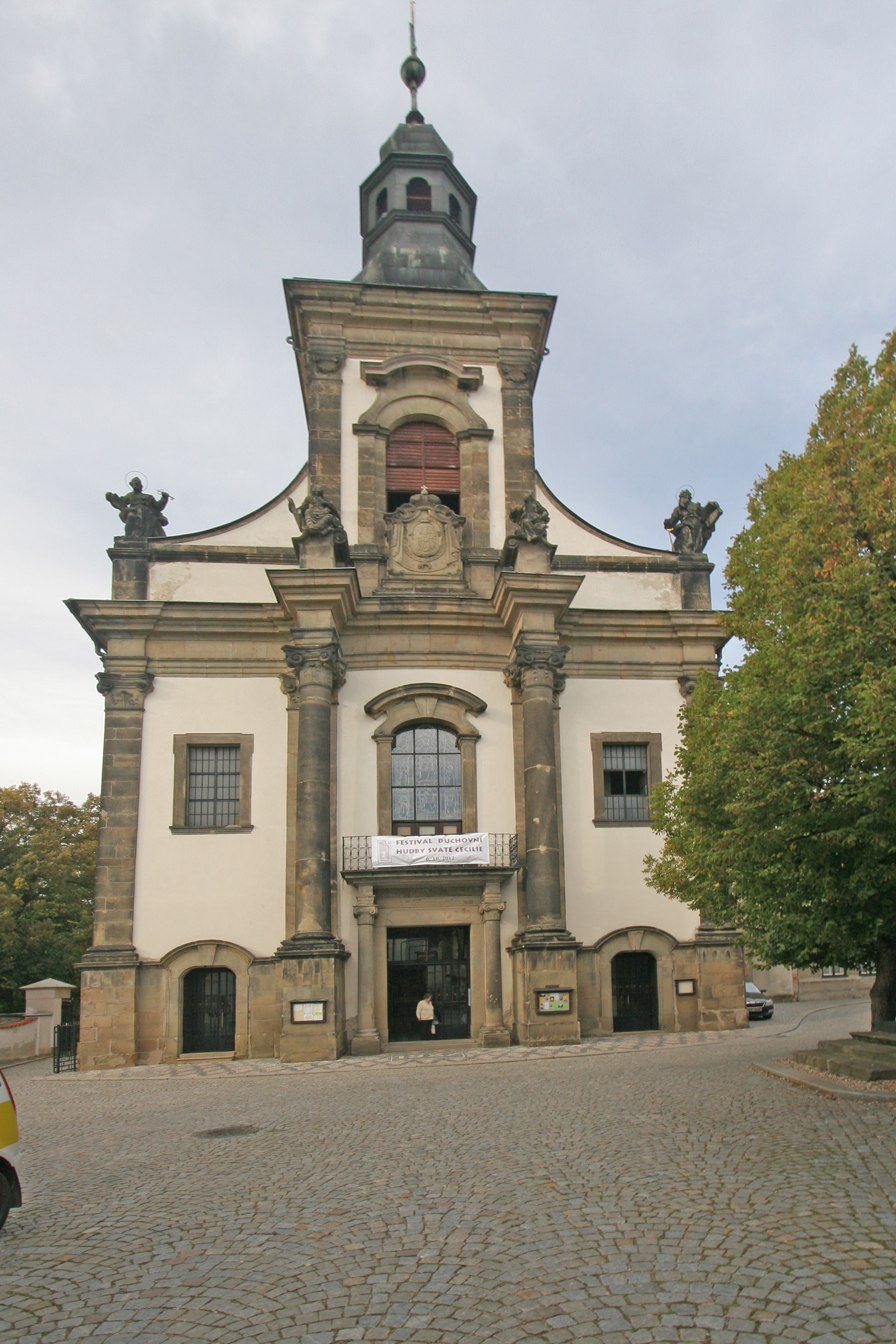
Church of the Assumption of the Virgin Mary

Ústí nad Orlicí was founded in the second half of the 13th century, during the reign of King Ottokar II of Bohemia. Its predecessor was a Slavic settlement called Oustí. The first written mention of the town is from 1285, when King Wenceslaus II gifted it to Záviš of Falkenstein.

In 1292, after death of Záviš, Wenceslaus II gifted the settlement to the Cistercian monks at Königsaal. They passed the town to the Litomyšl bishopric in 1358. During the 15th and 16th centuries, it was owned by various noble families, including the Kostkas of Postupice and the Pernštejn family.

The town was damaged by a large fire in 1495. After the Battle of White Mountain in 1620, Ústí was acquired by the Liechtenstein family. There were guilds of weavers established here in the 16th century. The town was slow to recover from the lootings of the Thirty Years' War, then was destroyed by fire in 1705.

It gained municipal status in 1795. When Ústí was connected to the railway network by the Olomouc–Prague line in 1845, the textile business boomed. It gained the tagline of "the Manchester of Eastern Bohemia", and became an important textile centre. It was an important railway junction and from 1850 became a regional centre.

== Demographics ==
Historical population

| Year | Pop. | ±% |
|---|---|---|
| 1869 | 7,814 | — |
| 1880 | 7,799 | −0.2% |
| 1890 | 8,282 | +6.2% |
| 1900 | 10,334 | +24.8% |
| 1910 | 11,290 | +9.3% |

| Year | Pop. | ±% |
|---|---|---|
| 1921 | 9,804 | −13.2% |
| 1930 | 12,127 | +23.7% |
| 1950 | 11,121 | −8.3% |
| 1961 | 11,634 | +4.6% |
| 1970 | 12,843 | +10.4% |

| Year | Pop. | ±% |
|---|---|---|
| 1980 | 15,288 | +19.0% |
| 1991 | 15,295 | +0.0% |
| 2001 | 15,192 | −0.7% |
| 2011 | 14,414 | −5.1% |
| 2021 | 13,958 | −3.2% |

Source: Censuses

== Economy ==
The largest industrial employer based in the town is Rieter CZ, a manufacturer of textile machinery with more than 250 employees.

== Transport ==
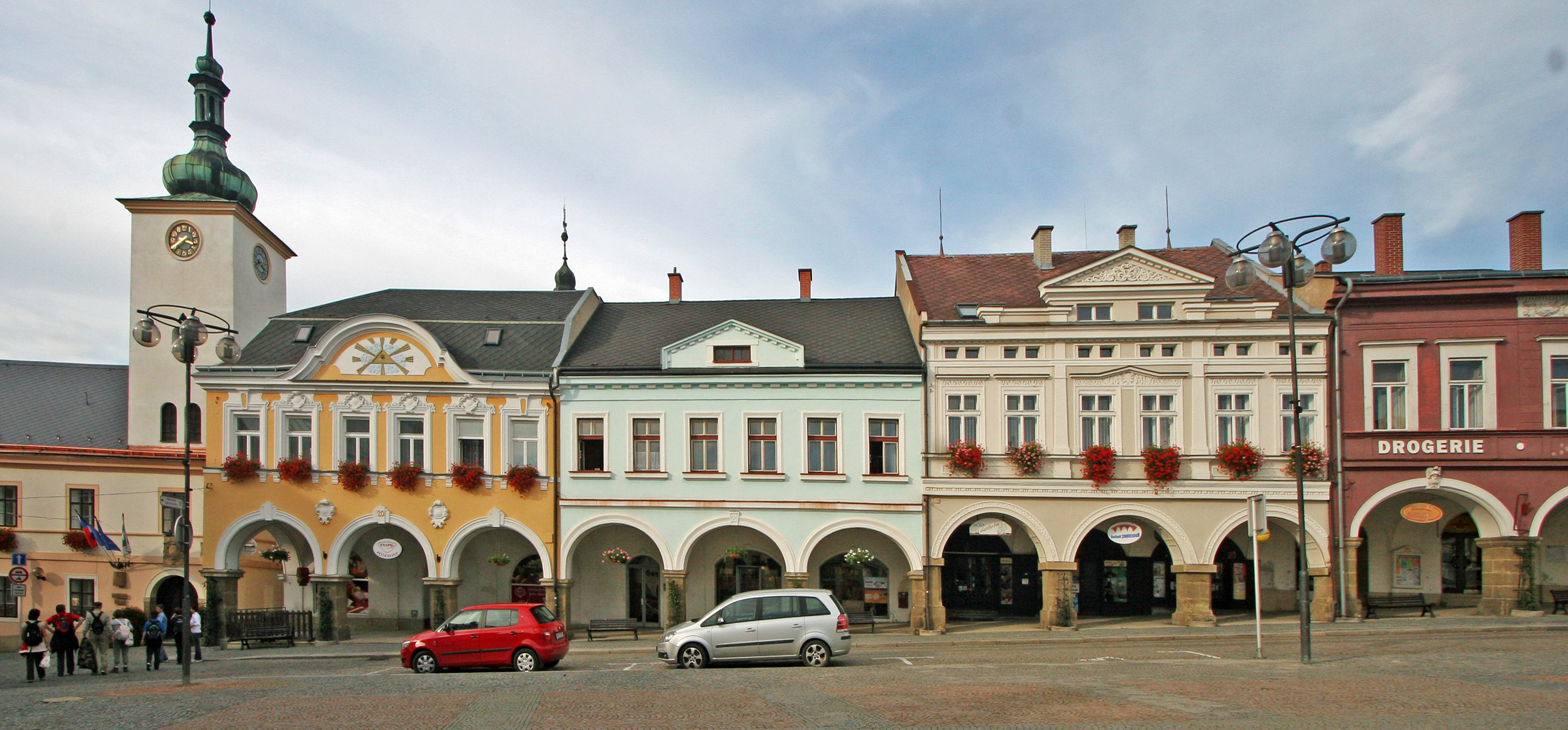
Town hall and houses on Mírové náměstí

The I/14 road (the section from Rychnov nad Kněžnou to Česká Třebová) runs through the town.

Ústí nad Orlicí is located on the Prague–Košice international railway line. The town is also served by the Prague–Luhačovice and Prague–Gdynia interregional lines and by a regional line heading from Česká Třebová to Litomyšl.

== Sights ==
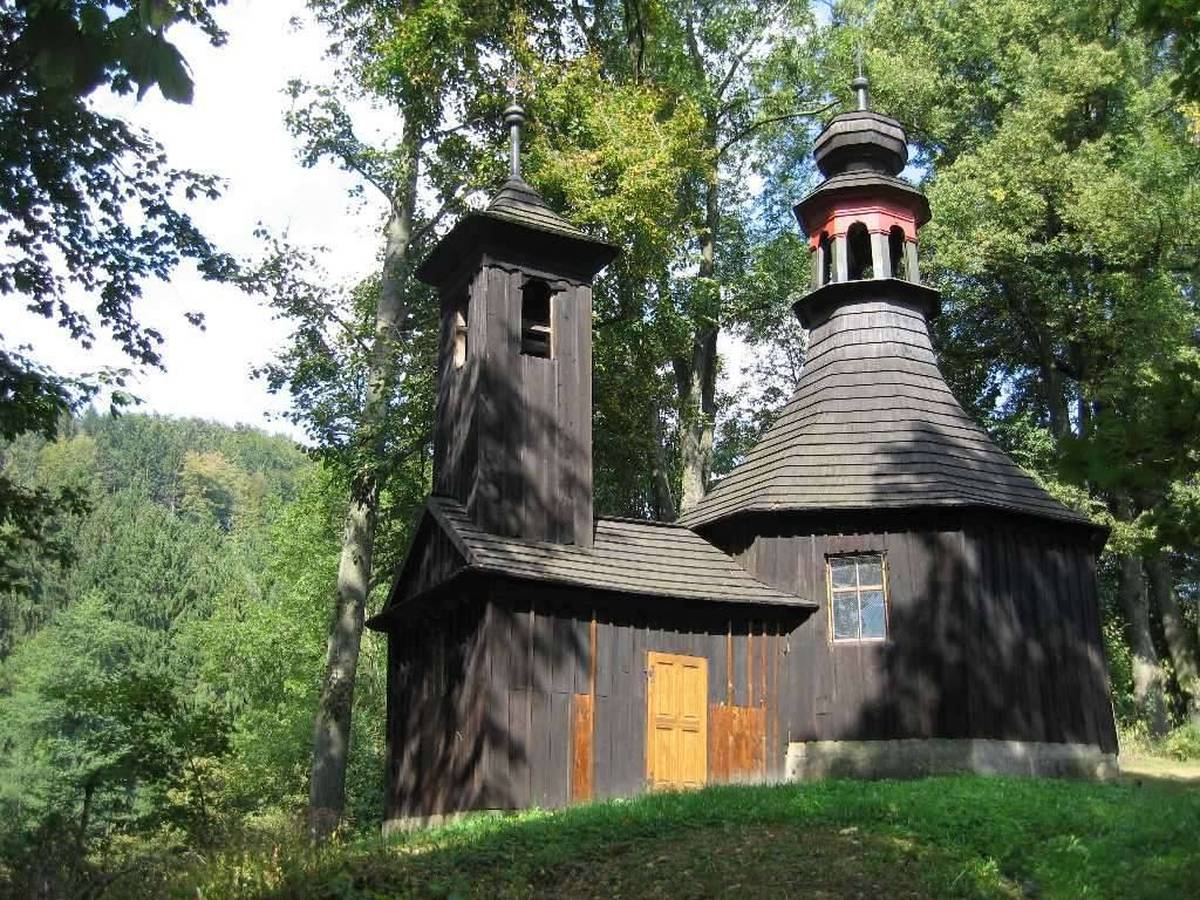
Church of the Visitation of Our Lady in Horní Houžovec

The square Mírové náměstí is a regular rectangular square with a floor plan preserved since the founding of the town. The square is surrounded by valuable arcaded houses. In the middle of the square is Marian column from 1737. The Baroque town hall was built in 1721–1723 and replaced the old town hall destroyed by fire. A school was built next to it in 1793. In 1850, the two buildings were structurally connected.

The Church of the Assumption of the Virgin Mary is a late Baroque church, built in 1770–1776. The adjoining deanery building was built in 1742–1748.

The Church of the Visitation of Our Lady in Horní Houžovec was built around 1800. It is a wooden rural church with an octagonal nave, valued as an example of vernacular architecture in the region.

The Church of Saints Peter and Paul is located in Knapovec. It was built in the late Empire style in 1832–1834. The adjoining deanery building was built in 1742–1748.

== Notable people ==
- František Martin Pecháček (1763–1816), composer
- Leopold Jansa (1795–1875), violinist and composer
- Fritz Löhner-Beda (1883–1942), Jewish author
- Jaroslav Kocian (1883–1950), violinist
- Oldřich Marek (1911–1986), entomologist
- Emila Medková (1928–1985), photographer
- Josef Lux (1956–1999), politician
- Luboš Adamec (1959–2025), sport shooter
- Roman Dostál (born 1970), biathlete
- Zdeňka Žádníková-Volencová (born 1974), actress
- Martin Netolický (born 1982), politician
- Michal Šlesingr (born 1983), biathlete
- Ondřej Moravec (born 1984), biathlete
- Jaroslav Kulhavý (born 1985), mountain biker, Olympic winner
- Kamil Vacek (born 1987), footballer

== Twin towns – sister cities ==
Ústí nad Orlicí is twinned with:

- Amberg, Germany
- Bystrzyca Kłodzka, Poland
- Massa Martana, Italy
- Neukölln (Berlin), Germany
- Poprad, Slovakia

== Gallery ==
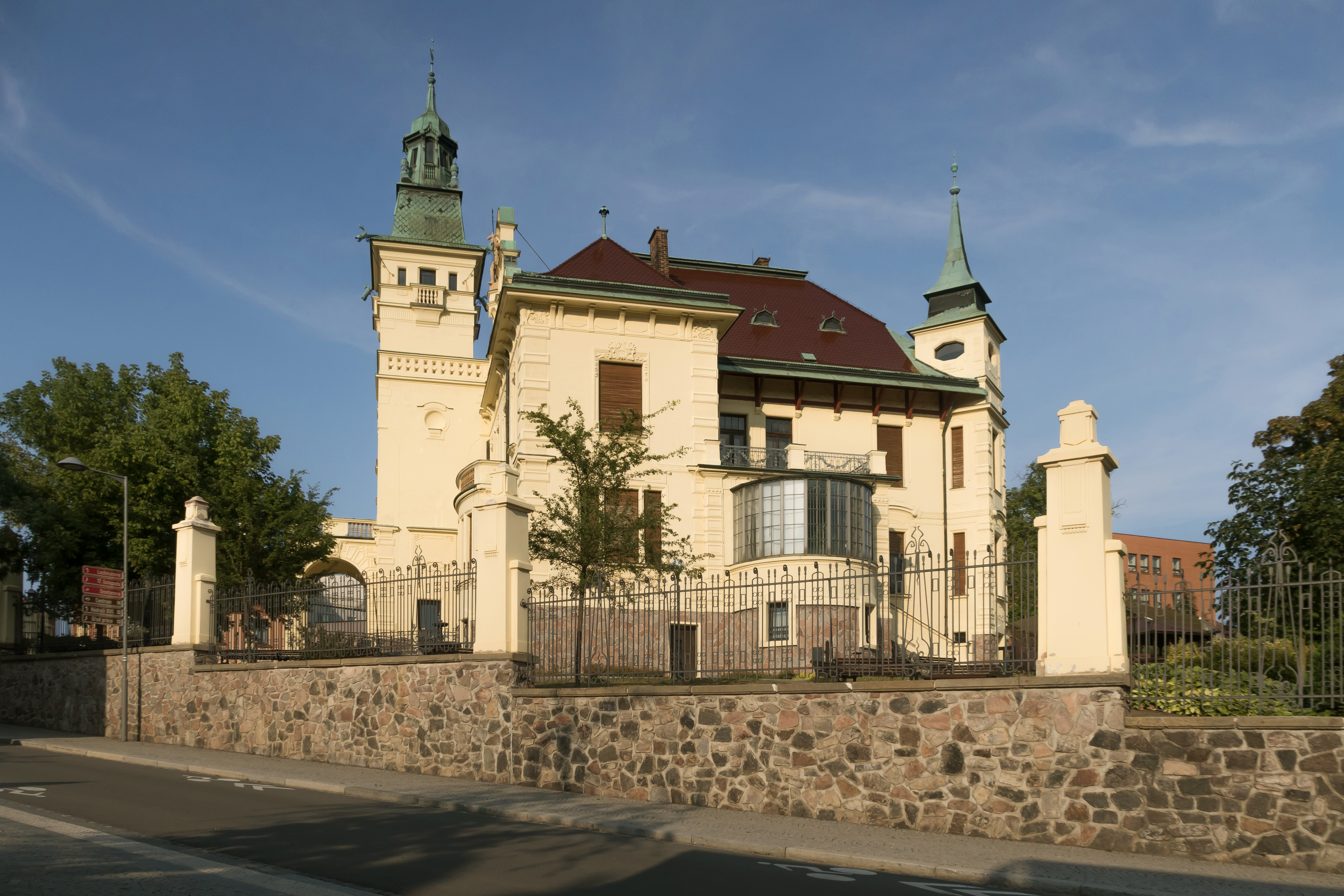
Hernych's villa

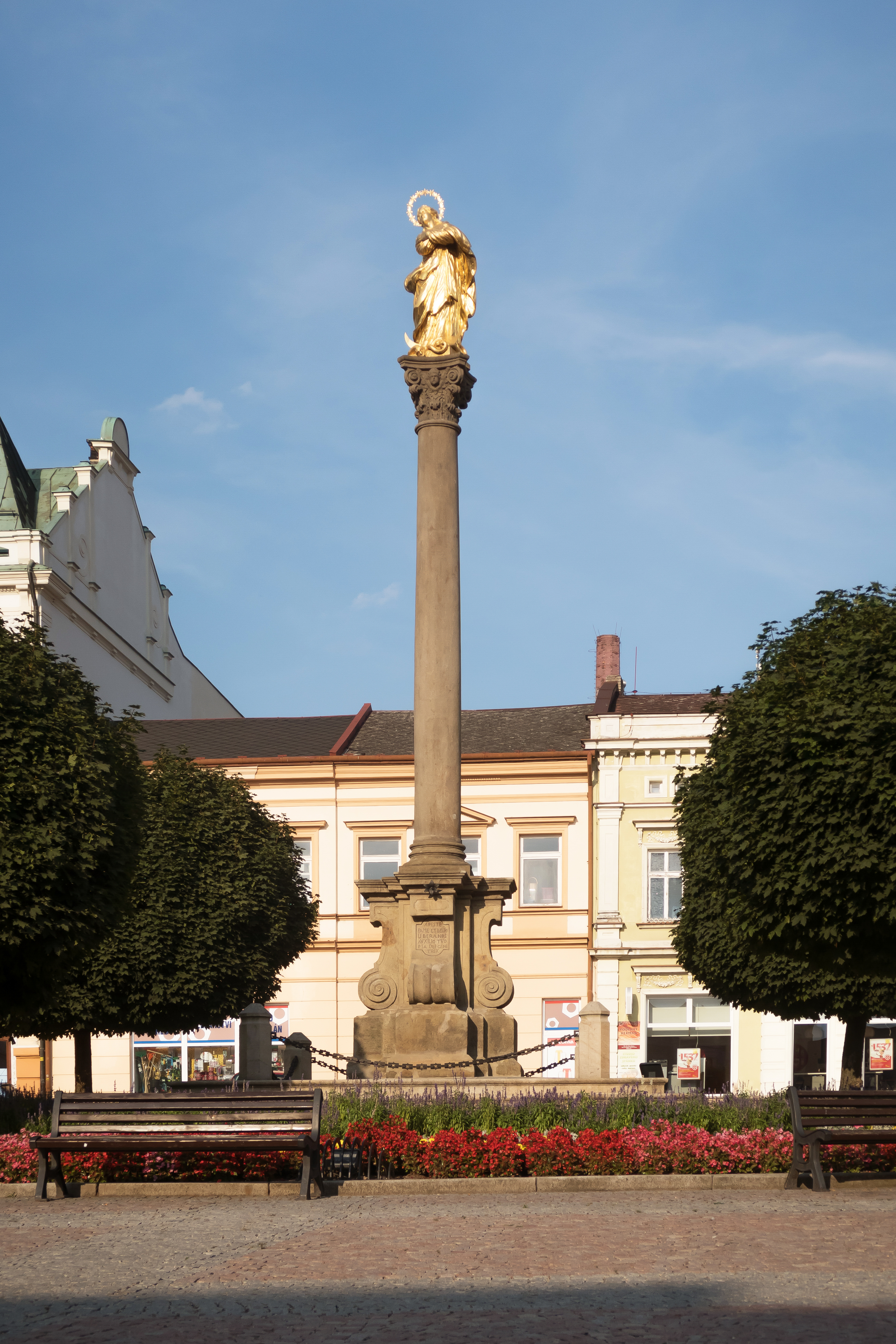
Marian column

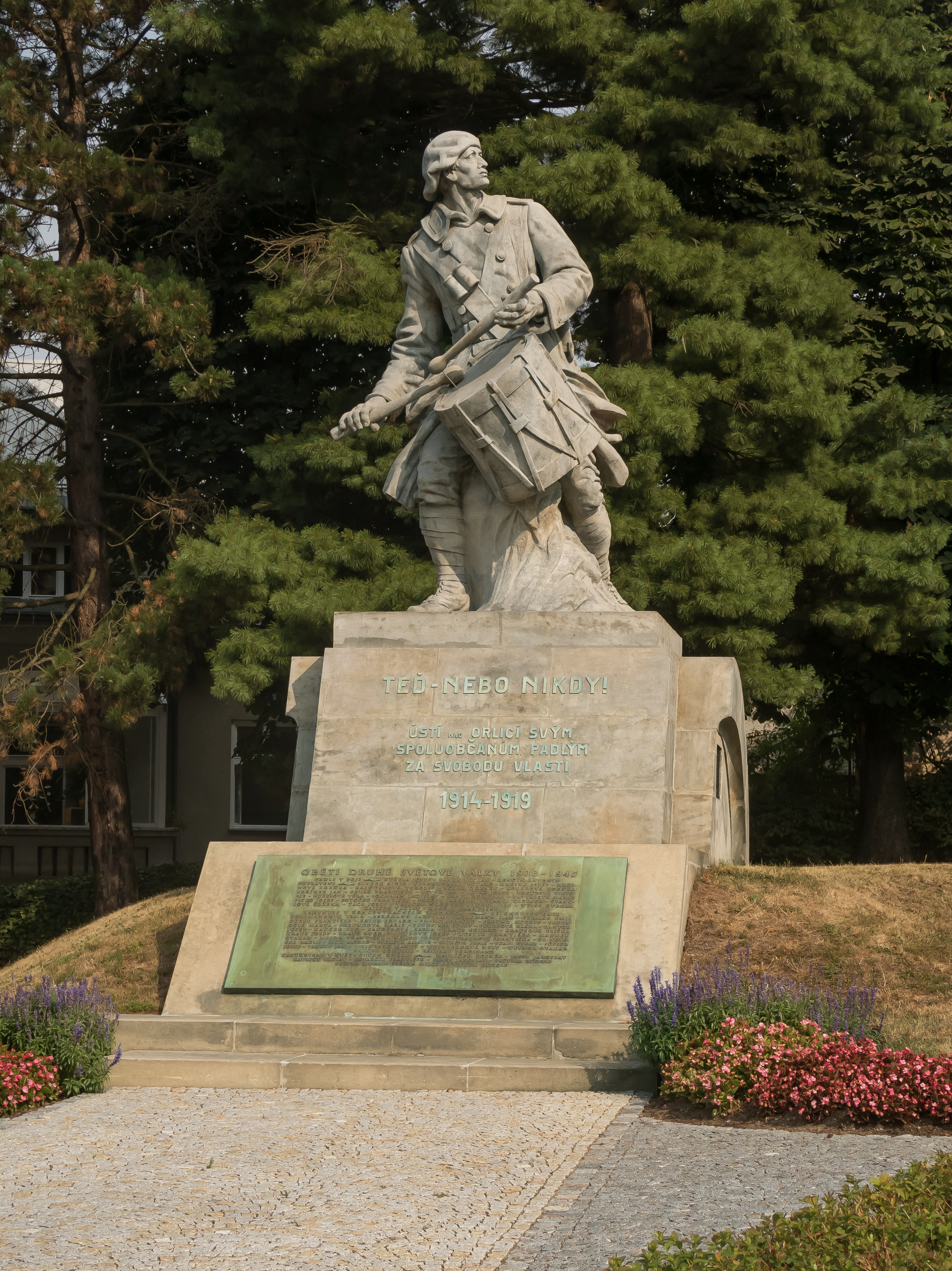
Bubnující legionář Sculpture
