= List of castles in the Pardubice Region =

Castles in the Czech Republic

This is a list of castles and chateaux located in the Pardubice Region of the Czech Republic.

== B ==
- Běstvina Chateau
- Biskupice Chateau
- Boršov Castle
- Brandýs nad Orlicí Castle
- Březovice Chateau

== C ==
- Čachnov Chateau
- Choceň Chateau
- Choltice Chateau
- Chrast Chateau
- Chroustovice Chateau
- Chrudim Castle
- Cimburk Castle

== D ==
- Dlouhá Loučka Castle
- Domoradice Chateau
- Dřel Castle

== H ==
- Heřmanův Městec Chateau
- Hoješín Chateau
- Hrad u Nekoře Castle
- Hradiště nad Semtěší Castle
- Hrochův Týnec Chateau

== J ==
- Jaroměřice Chateau
- Jevíčko Chateau

== K ==
- Karle Castle
- Kladruby nad Labem Chateau
- Koclířov Chateau
- Kočičí hrádek Castle
- Koldín Chateau
- Kostelec u Heřmanova Městce Castle
- Košumberk Castle
- Kunětická hora Castle
- Kyšperk Castle

== L ==
- Lanškroun Chateau
- Lanšperk Castle
- Letohrad Chateau
- Lichnice Castle
- Litice Castle
- Litomyšl Chateau

== M ==
- Medlešice Chateau
- Mendryka Chateau
- Moravany Chateau
- Moravská Třebová Chateau

== N ==
- Nabočany Chateau
- Nasavrky Chateau
- Neulust Chateau
- Nové Hrady Castle
- Nové Hrady Chateau

== O ==
- Oheb Castle
- Orlice Chateau
- Orlík Castle

== P ==
- Pardubice Chateau
- Plankenberk Castle
- Polička Castle
- Přestavlky Chateau

== R ==
- Rabštejnek Castle
- Radkov Castle
- Ronov nad Doubravou Chateau
- Rosice Chateau
- Rozpakov Castle
- Rudoltice Chateau
- Rychmburk Castle

== S ==
- Seč Chateau
- Semín Chateau
- Slatiňany Chateau
- Strádov Castle
- Svobodné Hamry Chateau
- Svojanov Castle

== T ==
- Tatenice Chateau
- Třebovské hradisko Castle
- Třemošnice Chateau

== V ==
- Vildštejn Castle
- Vraní Hora Castle

== Z ==
- Zdechovice Chateau
- Žamberk Chateau
- Žampach Castle
- Žumberk Castle
- Zámrsk Chateau
- Zítkov Castle

== See also ==
- List of castles in the Czech Republic
- List of castles in Europe
- List of castles
