= List of castles in Bremen =

This list encompasses castles in the Free Hanseatic City of Bremen described in German as Burg (castle), Festung (fort/fortress), Schloss (manor house) and Palais/Palast (palace). Many German castles after the Middle Ages were mainly built as royal or ducal palaces rather than as fortified buildings.

== List ==
- Schönebeck Castle, Vegesack
- Wätjens Castle, Bremen-Blumenthal
- Burg Blomendal, Bremen-Blumenthal

== See also ==
- List of castles
- List of castles in Germany
