= Chroustovice =

- Market town
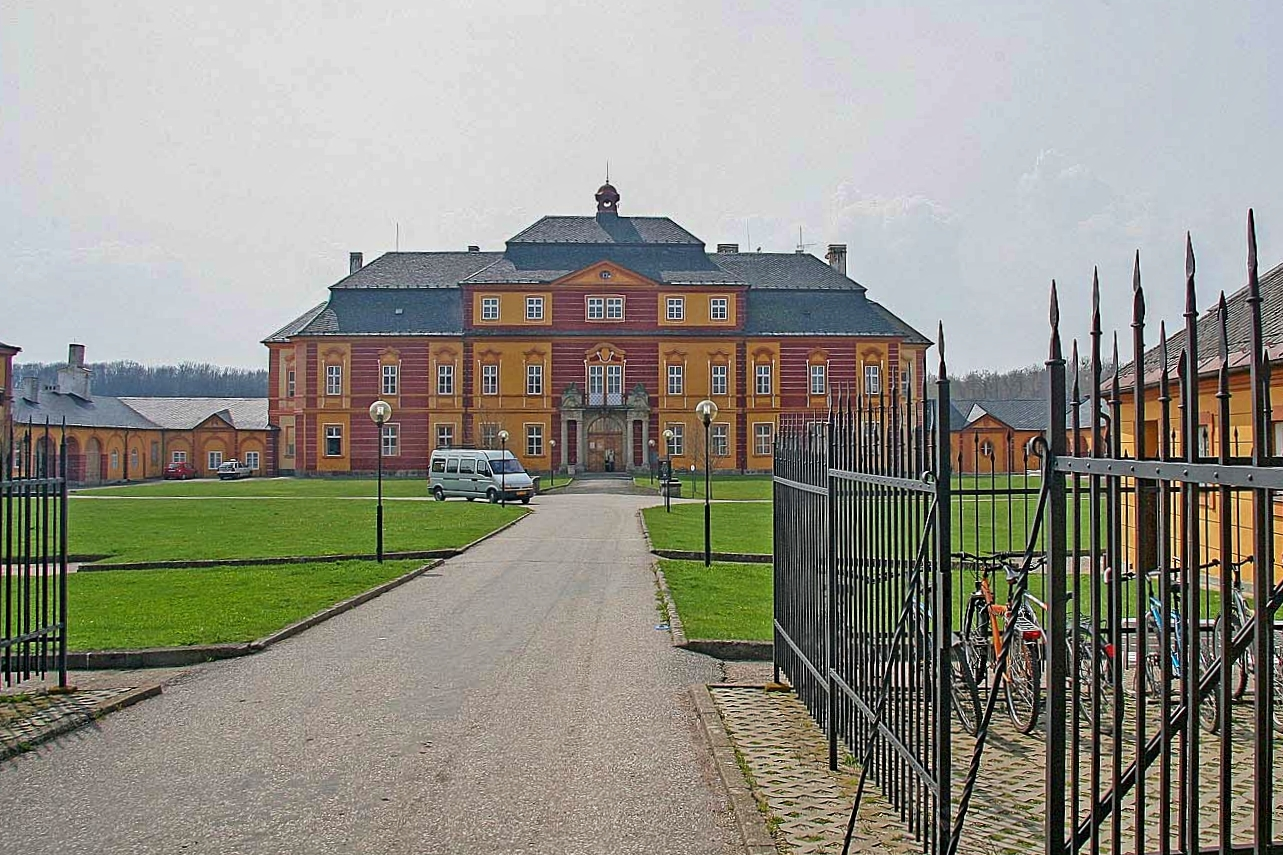
- Chroustovice Castle

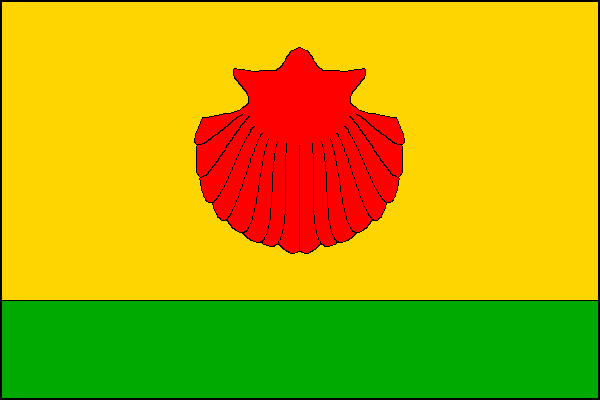
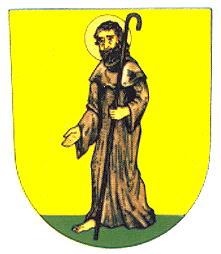
- Flag Coat of arms

- Location in the Czech Republic
- Coordinates: 49°57′22″N 15°59′40″E
- Country: Czech Republic
- Region: Pardubice
- District: Chrudim
- First mentioned: 1349

Area
  - Total: 21.61 km^{2} (8.34 sq mi)
- Elevation: 225 m (738 ft)

Population (2026-01-01)
  - Total: 1,292
  - Density: 59.79/km^{2} (154.8/sq mi)
- Time zone: UTC+1 (CET)
  - Summer (DST): UTC+2 (CEST)
- Postal code: 538 63
- Website: www.obec-chroustovice.net

Chroustovice (Czech pronunciation: [ˈxroustovɪtsɛ]) is a market town in Chrudim District in the Pardubice Region of the Czech Republic. It has about 1,300 inhabitants.

== Administrative division ==
Chroustovice consists of seven municipal parts (in brackets population according to the 2021 census):

- Chroustovice (692)
- Březovice (20)
- Holešovice (78)
- Lhota u Chroustovic (103)
- Mentour (43)
- Městec (212)
- Poděčely (45)

== Etymology ==
The settlement was originally called Chrústovice. The name was derived from the personal name Chrúst, meaning "the village of Chrúst's people".

== Geography ==
Chroustovice is located about 13 kilometres (8 mi) east of Chrudim and 17 km (11 mi) southeast of Pardubice. It lies mostly in the Svitavy Uplands, only the northern part of the municipal territory extends into the East Elbe Table. The Novohradka River flows through the market town. The Loučná River briefly flows along the northern municipal border.

== History ==
The first written mention of Chroustovice is from 1349. In 1418, it became a market town. Until the 16th century, the estate was owned by various lower noblemen and the owners often changed. In the 16th century, Chroustovice was bought by the Slavata of Chlum family, who annexed it to the Košumberk estate. Zachariáš Slavata of Chlum had rebuilt the local fortress into a Renaissance castle.

In 1663, Chroustovice was bought by a branch of the Kolowrat family. In 1676, Count František Karel Libštejnský of Kolowrat had demolished the old castle and replaced it with a new Baroque one. In 1779, it was acquired by the Kinsky family. The last feudal owners of Chroustovice was the Thurn und Taxis family, which purchased the estate in 1823.

== Demographics ==
Historical population

Year	Pop.	±%
1869	2,253	—
1880	2,258	+0.2%
1890	2,288	+1.3%
1900	2,311	+1.0%
1910	2,415	+4.5%

Year	Pop.	±%
1921	2,418	+0.1%
1930	2,310	−4.5%
1950	1,725	−25.3%
1961	1,766	+2.4%
1970	1,510	−14.5%

Year	Pop.	±%
1980	1,355	−10.3%
1991	1,230	−9.2%
2001	1,243	+1.1%
2011	1,230	−1.0%
2021	1,193	−3.0%

Source: Censuses

== Transport ==
The I/17 road from Čáslav to Zámrsk runs through the market town. The D35 motorway briefly crosses the municipal territory in the north.

In the northern tip of the municipal territory is the train station Uhersko, located on the Kolín–Česká Třebová railway line. It is named after the neighbouring village of Uhersko.

== Sights ==
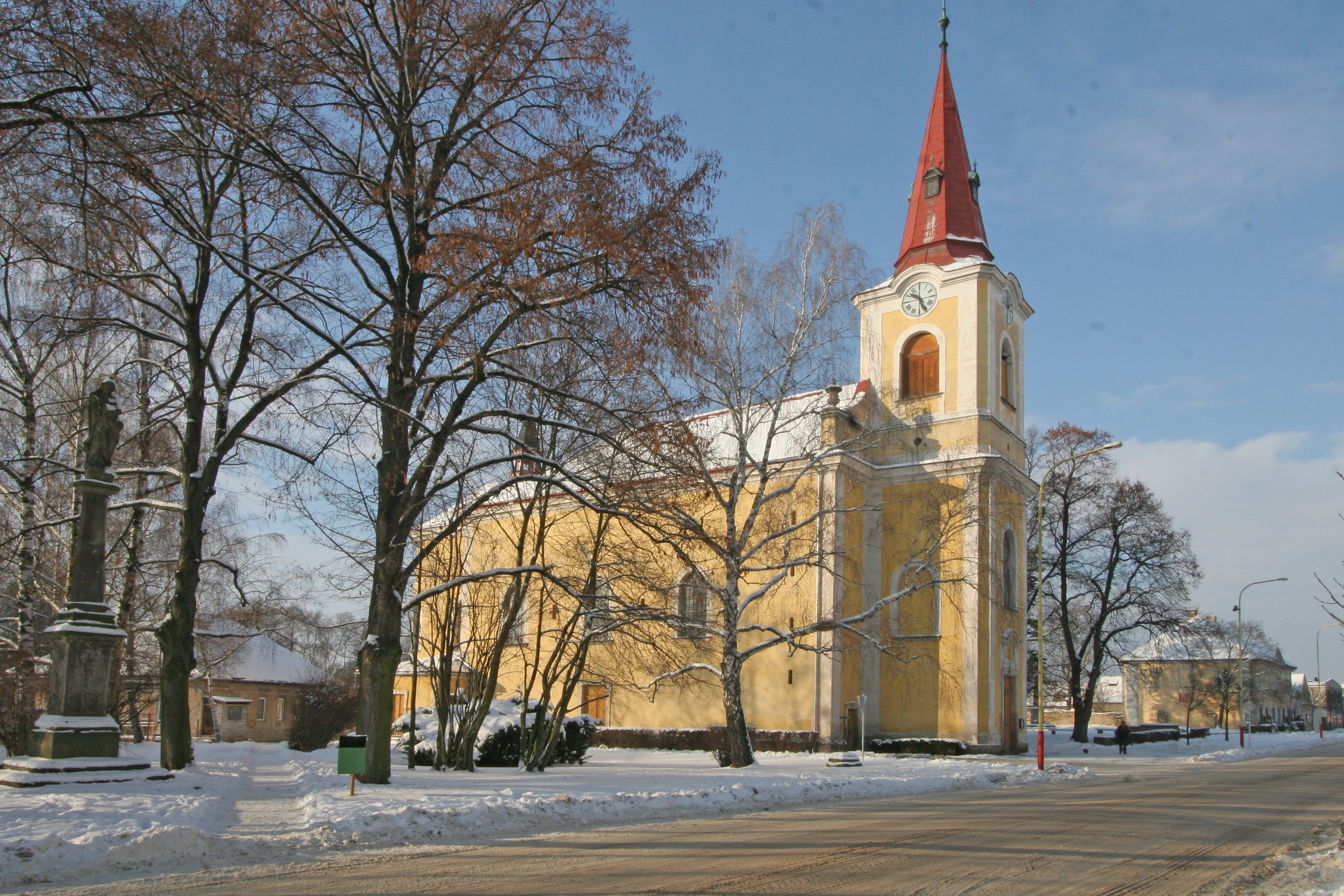
Church of Saint James the Great

One of the two main landmarks of Chroustovice is the Church of Saint James the Great. It was built in the late Baroque style in 1774.

The Chroustovice Castle was built in the Baroque style in the second half of the 17th century. In 1779–1780, it was modified in the Rococo style. next to the castle is a French formal garden. Today the castle houses a vocational school and a practical school.

== Notable people ==
- Rudolph Novak (1887–1968), American gymnast
- Zdeněk Černohorský (1910–2001), lichenologist
- František Pitra (1932–2018), politician, Prime Minister of Czechoslovakia (1988–1990)
