= Rabštejnská Lhota =

- Municipality
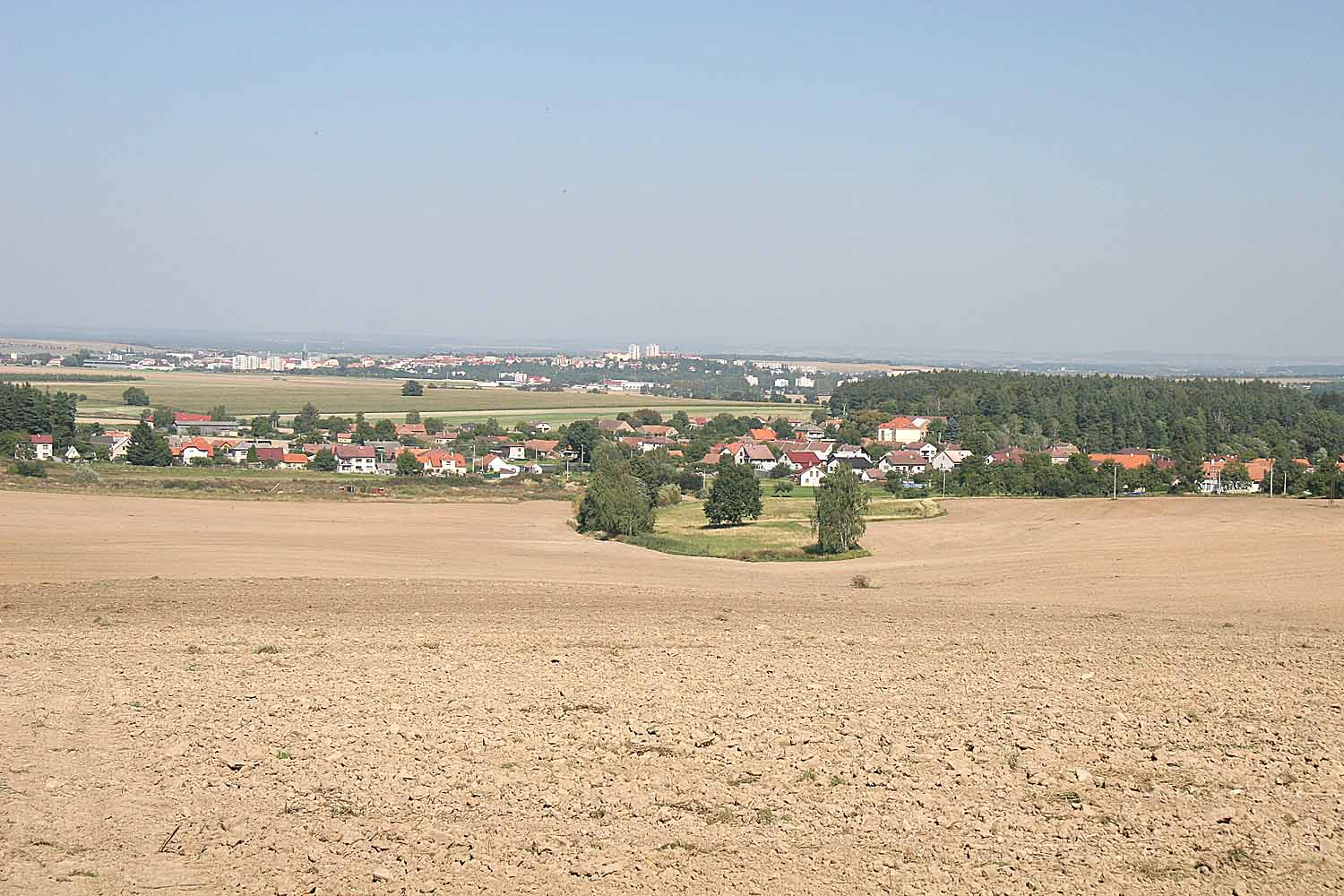
- General view

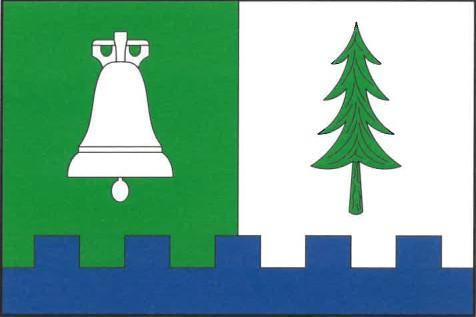
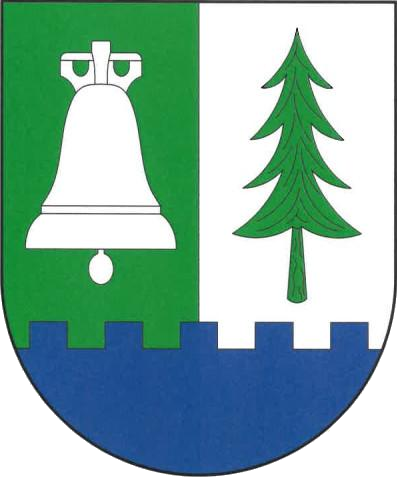
- Flag Coat of arms

- Location in the Czech Republic
- Coordinates: 49°54′56″N 15°46′5″E
- Country: Czech Republic
- Region: Pardubice
- District: Chrudim
- First mentioned: 1414

Area
  - Total: 7.11 km^{2} (2.75 sq mi)
- Elevation: 306 m (1,004 ft)

Population (2026-01-01)
  - Total: 888
  - Density: 125/km^{2} (323/sq mi)
- Time zone: UTC+1 (CET)
  - Summer (DST): UTC+2 (CEST)
- Postal codes: 537 01, 538 21
- Website: www.rabstejnskalhota.cz

Rabštejnská Lhota is a municipality and village in Chrudim District in the Pardubice Region of the Czech Republic. It has about 900 inhabitants.

== Administrative division ==
Rabštejnská Lhota consists of three municipal parts (in brackets population according to the 2021 census):

- Rabštejnská Lhota (609)
- Rabštejn (61)
- Smrkový Týnec (161)

== Demographics ==
Historical population
Year	Pop.	±%
1869	434	—
1880	453	+4.4%
1890	513	+13.2%
1900	561	+9.4%
1910	593	+5.7%
1921	561	−5.4%
1930	612	+9.1%
1950	551	−10.0%
1961	544	−1.3%
1970	515	−5.3%
1980	504	−2.1%
1991	560	+11.1%
2001	595	+6.2%
2011	691	+16.1%
2021	831	+20.3%
Source: Censuses

== Sights ==
Ruins of Rabštejnek Castle lie next to Rabštejn.
