= Zdeněk Černohorský =

Czech lichenologist (27 December 1910–5 September 2001)

- Born: 27 December 1910; Chroustovice, Kingdom of Bohemia
- Died: 5 September 2001 (aged 90); Prague, Czech Republic
- Education: Charles University
- Scientific career
- Fields: Lichenology
- Author abbrev. (botany): Čern.

Zdeněk Černohorský (27 December 1910 – 5 September 2001) was a Czech lichenologist and educator.

== Life and career ==
Zdeněk Černohorský was born in a poor family of a village baker in the village Chroustovice (east Bohemia). Černohorský attended Charles University in Prague. He graduated in 1933 with a degree in natural sciences with a specialisation in lichenology. Following university he taught in several schools–first, a primary school in Chroustovice, and later, secondary schools in Český Krumlov, Mělník and Prague. In 1938 he lost a lot of his property following involuntary resettlement resulting from the Munich Agreement.

After WWII, Černohorský was able to start his professional career at the University of Agriculture and Forestry (now the Czech University of Life Sciences Prague). In 1949 he received his habilitation, and that same year was appointed professor at the Faculty of Education at Charles University. In 1959, he was transferred to the Faculty of Sciences at the same institution, where he stayed until his retirement in 1977. He was dean of the university from 1961 to 1963.

Černohorský contributions to lichenology include co-authoring new Czechoslovak species, introducing fluorescence analysis into lichen identification, and a series of taxonomical and chorological studies on the genus Rhizocarpon. He was also interested in the anatomy and morphology of seed plants. Černohorský wrote a monograph on seeds of the plant family Cruciferae, and a textbook on plant morphology that was published in eight editions. Černohorský enjoyed teaching, and frequently published articles in Vesmír, a Czech popular science magazine.

Černohorský was the chairman of the Czech Botanical Society for twelve years, and an honorary member of that society since 1976. He was the chief editor of its periodical Preslia for 27 years. Because of his contributions to Slovak botany and lichenology, he became an honorary member of the Slovak Botanical Society (SBS) in 1979, and in 1996 he was awarded the SBS Commemorative Medal.

== Eponyms ==
Several taxa have been named to honour Černohorský. These include the lichen species Russula cernohorskyi Singer 1935); Thyrea cernohorskyi Servít (1935); Physcia cernohorskyi Nádv. (1947); Verrucaria cernohorskyi Servít (1950); Polyblastia cernohorskyana Servít (1954); Gyalecta cernohorskyi Vězda (1958); Lecanora cernohorskyana Clauzade & Vězda (1970); and the variety Verrucaria timkoii var. cernohorskyi Servít (1948).

== Selected works ==
- Servít, Miroslav; Černohorský, Zdeněk (1934). Flechten aus der Čechoslovakei. Nákladem Královské České Společnosti Nauk.
- Černohorský, Zdeněk (1950). "Fluorescence of lichens in ultra-violet light. Genus Parmelia Ach". Studia Botanica Čechoslovaca. 11: 98–100.
- Černohorský, Zdeněk (1963). "Survival of lichens during the glacial age in the North Atlantic Basin". North Atlantic Biota and Their History. Oxford: Pergamon Press. pp. 233–240.
- Černohorský, Zdeněk (1966). "Die Verbreitung der Flechte Rhizocarpon viridiatrum (Wulf.) Körb. in der Tschechoslowakei". Preslia, Praha (in German). 38: 391–402.
- Černohorský, Zdeněk (1974). Graines des Crucifères de Bohème: étude anatomique et morphologique (in French). Československá botanická společnost.
