= Bohumil Laušman =

Czech politician

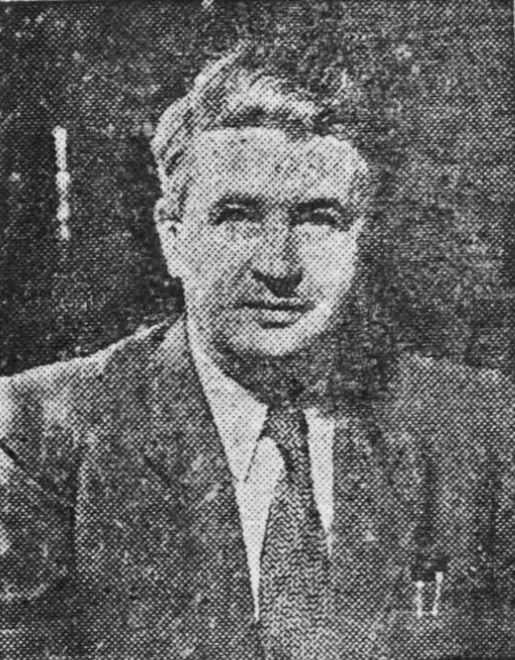
Laušman in February 1948

Bohumil Laušman (30 August 1903, Žumberk, Kingdom of Bohemia – 9 May 1963, Prague) was a Czech Social Democratic politician.

During World War II he was in exile in Great Britain, where he was a member of the Czechoslovak government in exile. He returned after the war and was Minister of Industry from 1945 until he was elected chairman of the Social Democratic party in 1947. In 1949 he went to exile again - via Yugoslavia to Austria.

He was kidnapped from exile in Austria by the Czech StB in 1953, imprisoned in Czechoslovakia and died "in unclear circumstances" in Ruzyně Prison in Prague in 1963.
