= Žumberk =

- Market town
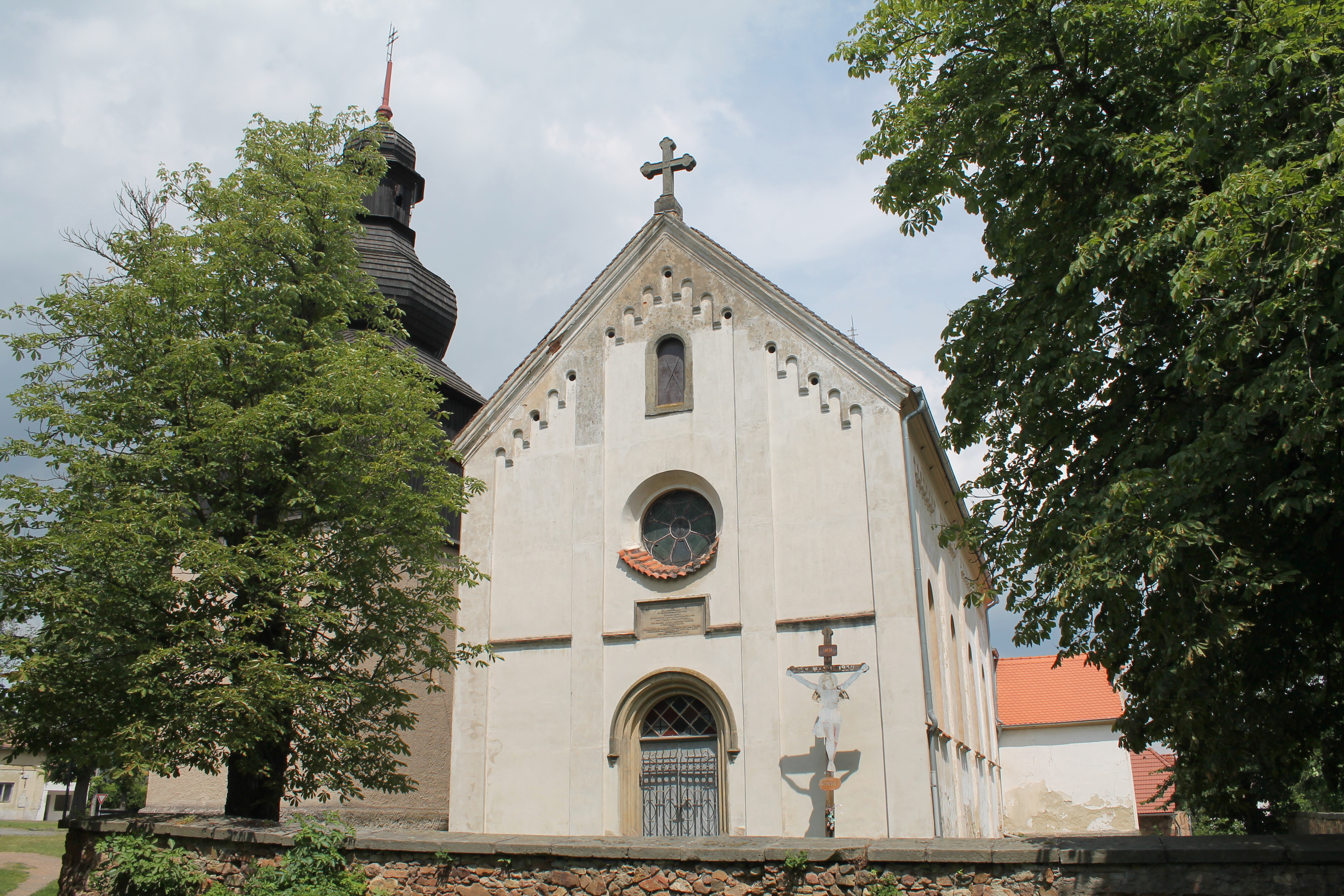
- Church of All Saints

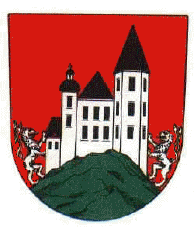
- Coat of arms

- Location in the Czech Republic
- Coordinates: 49°52′22″N 15°51′30″E
- Country: Czech Republic
- Region: Pardubice
- District: Chrudim
- First mentioned: 1318

Area
  - Total: 4.79 km^{2} (1.85 sq mi)
- Elevation: 355 m (1,165 ft)

Population (2026-01-01)
  - Total: 289
  - Density: 60.3/km^{2} (156/sq mi)
- Time zone: UTC+1 (CET)
  - Summer (DST): UTC+2 (CEST)
- Postal code: 538 36
- Website: www.obec-zumberk.cz

Žumberk (Czech pronunciation: [ˈʒumbɛrk]; German: Sonnenberg) is a market town in Chrudim District in the Pardubice Region of the Czech Republic. It has about 300 inhabitants.

== Administrative division ==
Žumberk consists of three municipal parts (in brackets population according to the 2021 census):

- Žumberk (234)
- Částkov (17)
- Prostějov (13)

== Etymology ==
The original German name Sonnenberg means 'sunny mountain'. The Czech name was created by transcription.

== Geography ==
Žumberk is located about 9 kilometres (6 mi) southeast of Chrudim and 18 km (11 mi) south of Pardubice. It lies in the Iron Mountains. The highest point is at 417 m (1,368 ft) above sea level. The Ležák River flows through the market town.

== History ==
The first written mention of Žumberk is from 1318. From 1487, Žumberk was referred to as a market town.

== Demographics ==
Historical population

Year	Pop.	±%
1869	664	—
1880	628	−5.4%
1890	666	+6.1%
1900	650	−2.4%
1910	749	+15.2%

Year	Pop.	±%
1921	708	−5.5%
1930	708	+0.0%
1950	497	−29.8%
1961	434	−12.7%
1970	369	−15.0%

Year	Pop.	±%
1980	295	−20.1%
1991	231	−21.7%
2001	222	−3.9%
2011	243	+9.5%
2021	264	+8.6%

Source: Censuses

== Transport ==
There are no railways or major roads passing through the municipality.

== Sights ==
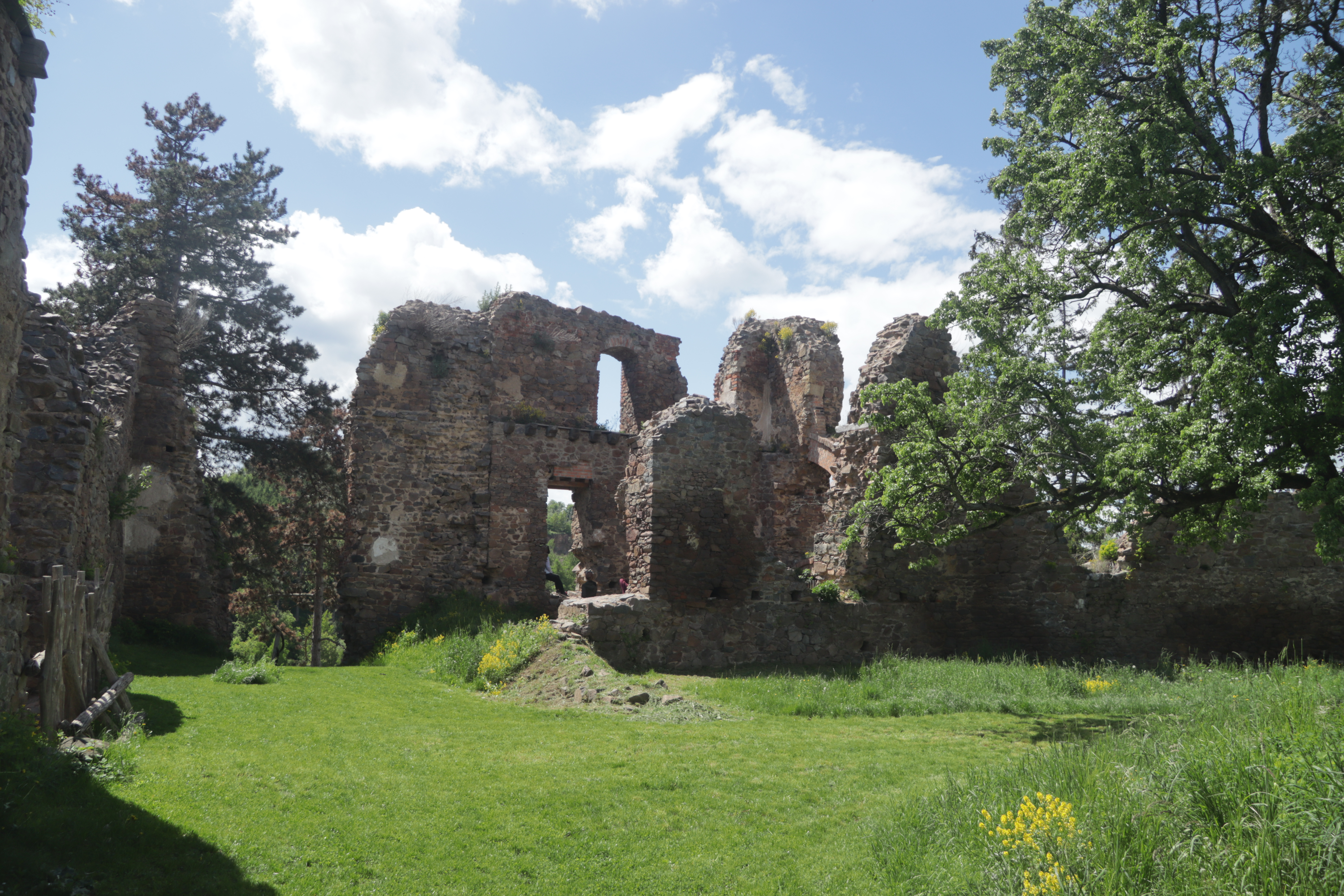
Ruins of Žumberk Castle

The main landmark of Žumberk is the Church of All Saints. It was originally a Gothic church, first documented in 1350. In 1782, it was completely rebuilt. The present form is a result of the pseudo-Romanesque reconstruction from 1880. Next to the church is a separate bell tower. It was built on the Gothic core in 1789.

Žumberk is known for the ruins of Žumberk Castle. It was built in the early 14th century. At the end of the 16th century, it was rebuilt into a Renaissance residence. At the end of the 18th century, it became a ruin.

== Notable people ==
- Bohumil Laušman (1903–1963), politician
