= Lists of castles by country =

The list of castles is a link page for any castle in the sense of a fortified building.

== Colombia ==
- Castillo San Felipe de Barajas

== Cuba ==
- La Cabaña
- Morro Castle
- Real Fuerza castle
- San Pedro de la Roca Castle

== Czech Republic ==
- List of castles in the Central Bohemian Region
- List of castles in the Hradec Králové Region
- List of castles in the Karlovy Vary Region
- List of castles in the Liberec Region
- List of castles in the Moravian-Silesian Region
- List of castles in the Olomouc Region
- List of castles in the Pardubice Region
- List of castles in the Plzeň Region
- List of castles in Prague
- List of castles in the South Bohemian Region
- List of castles in the South Moravian Region
- List of castles in the Ústí nad Labem Region
- List of castles in the Vysočina Region
- List of castles in the Zlín Region

== Denmark ==
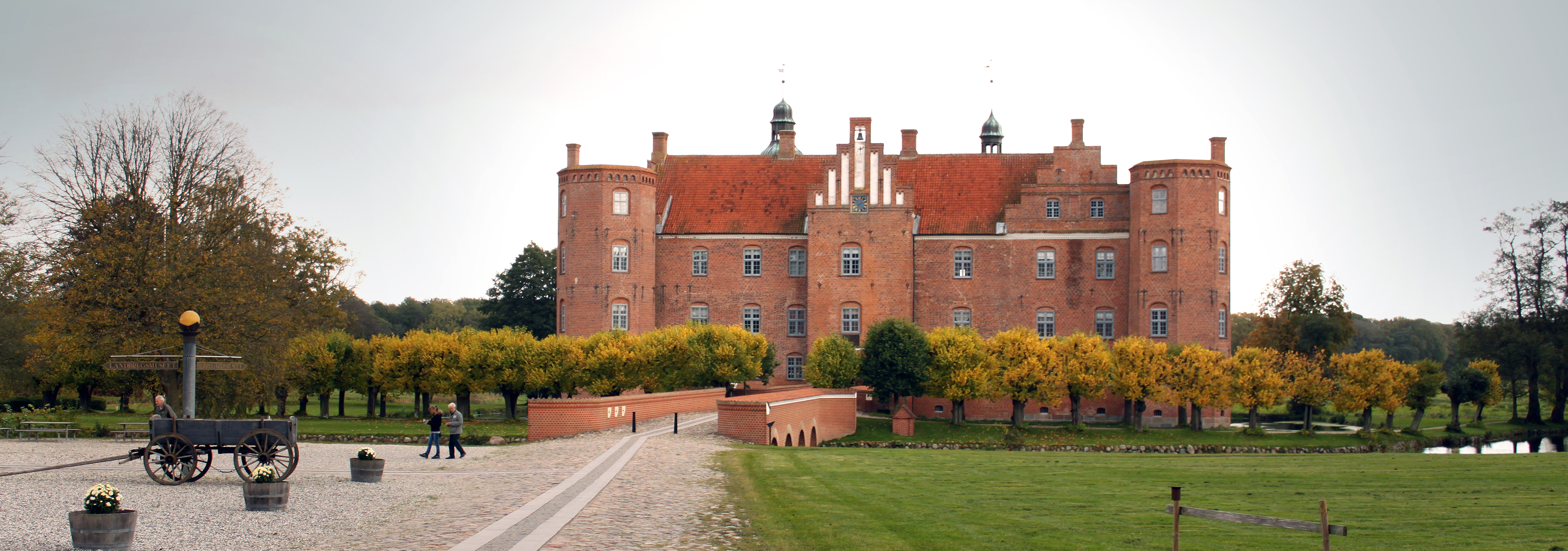
List of castles and palaces in Denmark

== Dominican Republic ==
- Fortaleza Ozama

== Egypt ==
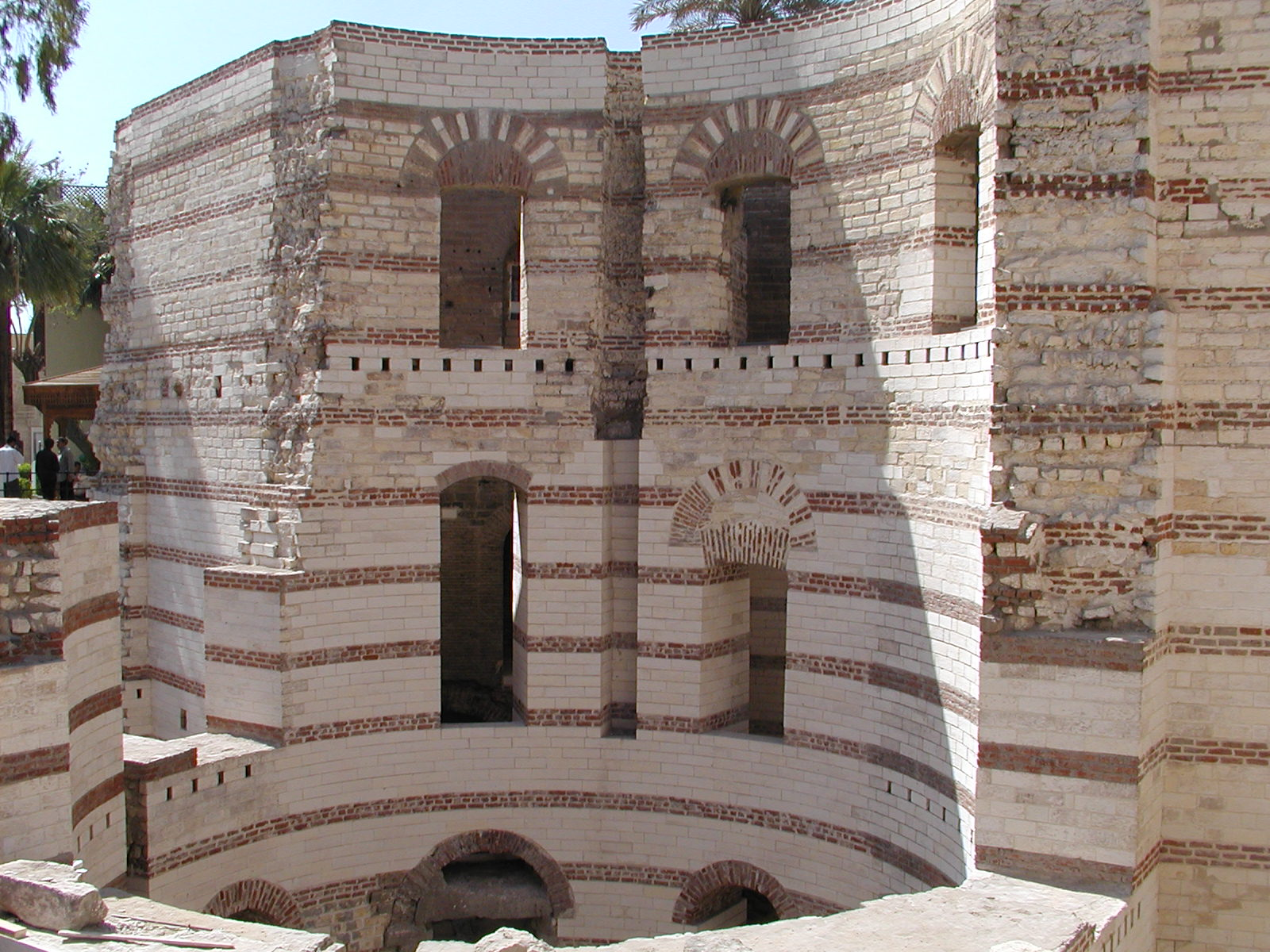
List of Egypt castles, forts, fortifications and city walls

== Ethiopia ==
- Guzara Castle
- Fasilides Castle
- Kusquam Castle

== Finland ==
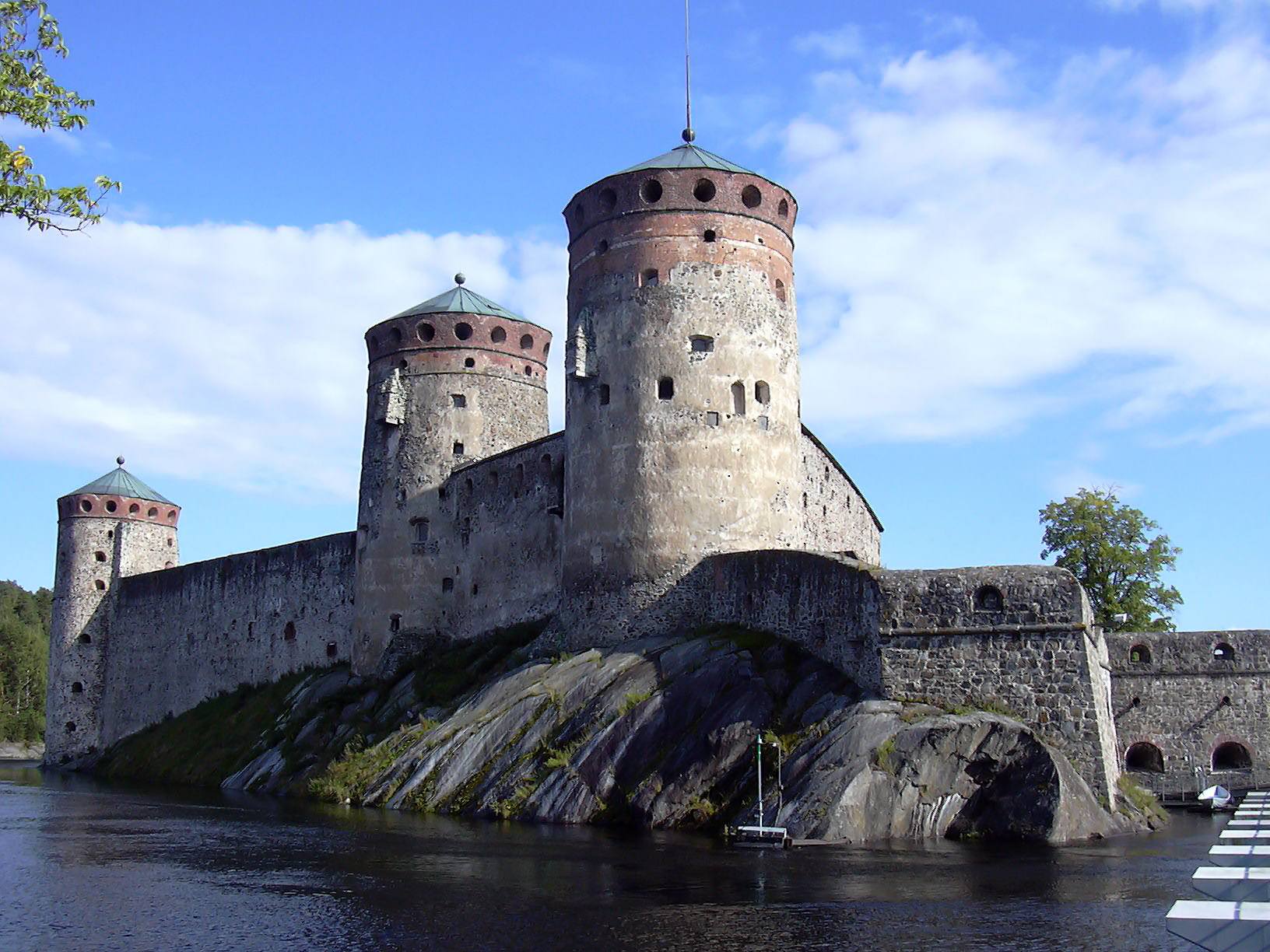
List of castles in Finland

== Germany ==
- List of castles in Baden-Württemberg
- List of castles in Bavaria
- List of castles in Berlin and Brandenburg
- List of castles in Bremen
- List of castles in Hamburg
- List of castles in Hesse
- List of castles and palaces in Lower Saxony
- List of castles and palaces in Mecklenburg-Vorpommern
- List of castles in North Rhine-Westphalia
- List of castles in Rhineland-Palatinate
- List of castles and palaces in Saarland
- List of castles and palaces in Saxony
- List of castles in Saxony-Anhalt
- List of castles in Schleswig-Holstein
- List of castles in Thuringia
- List of castles in the Eifel

== Ghana ==
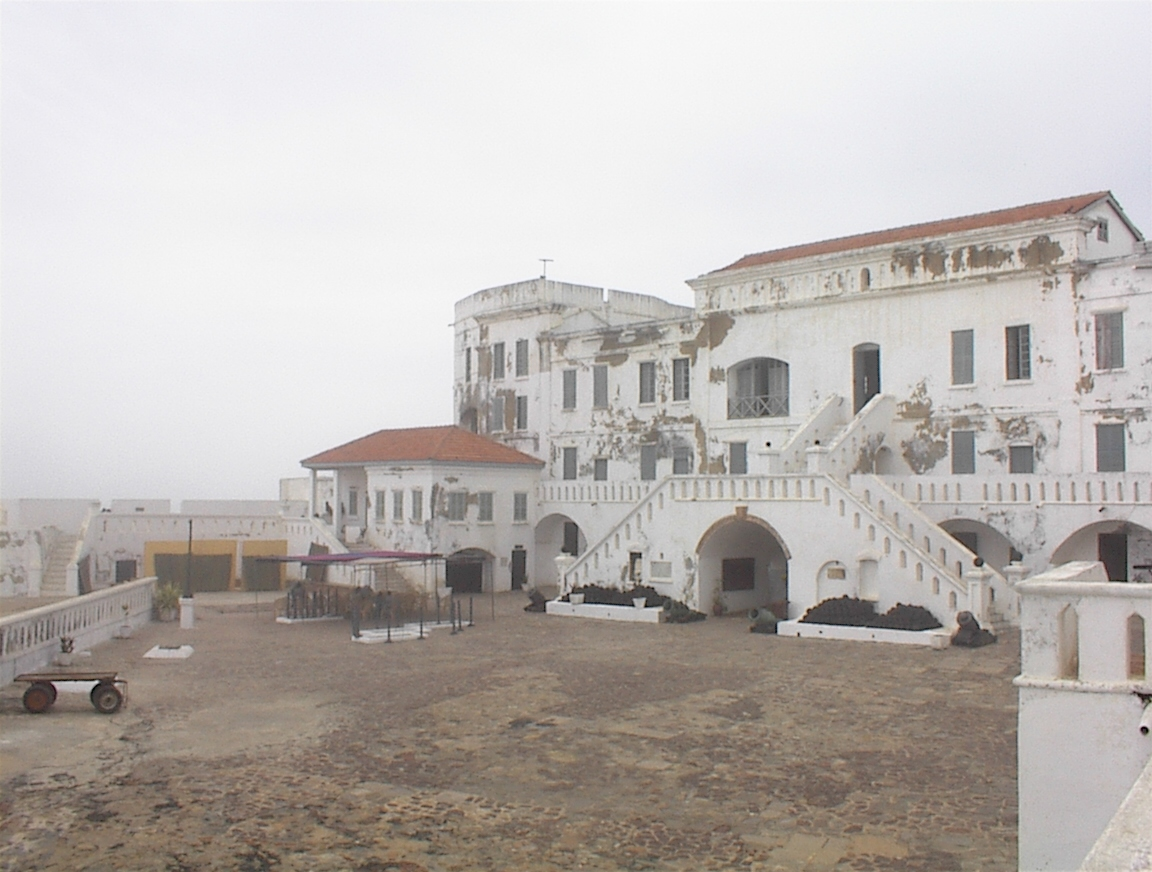
List of castles in Ghana

== Greece ==
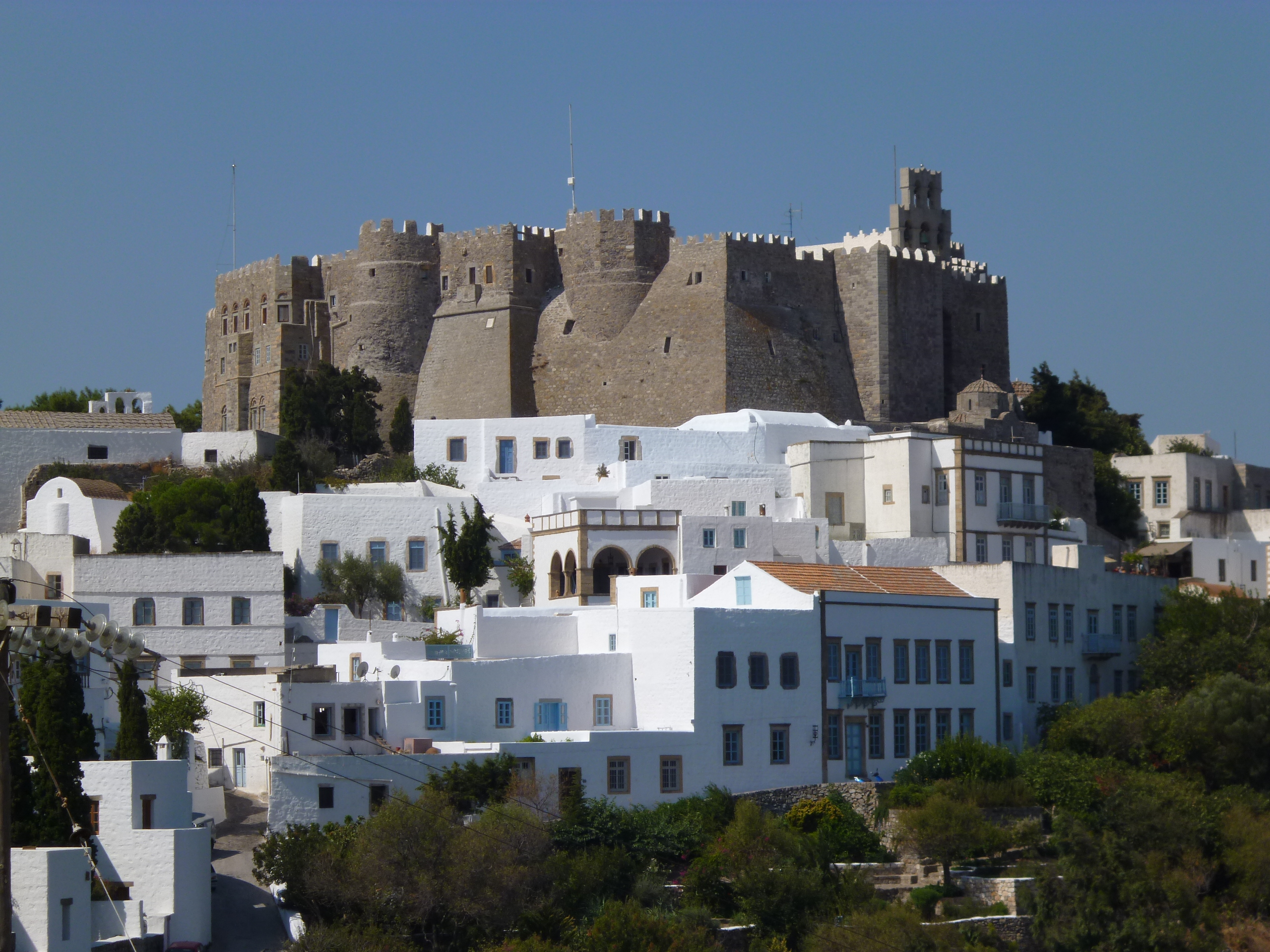
List of castles in Greece

== Ireland ==
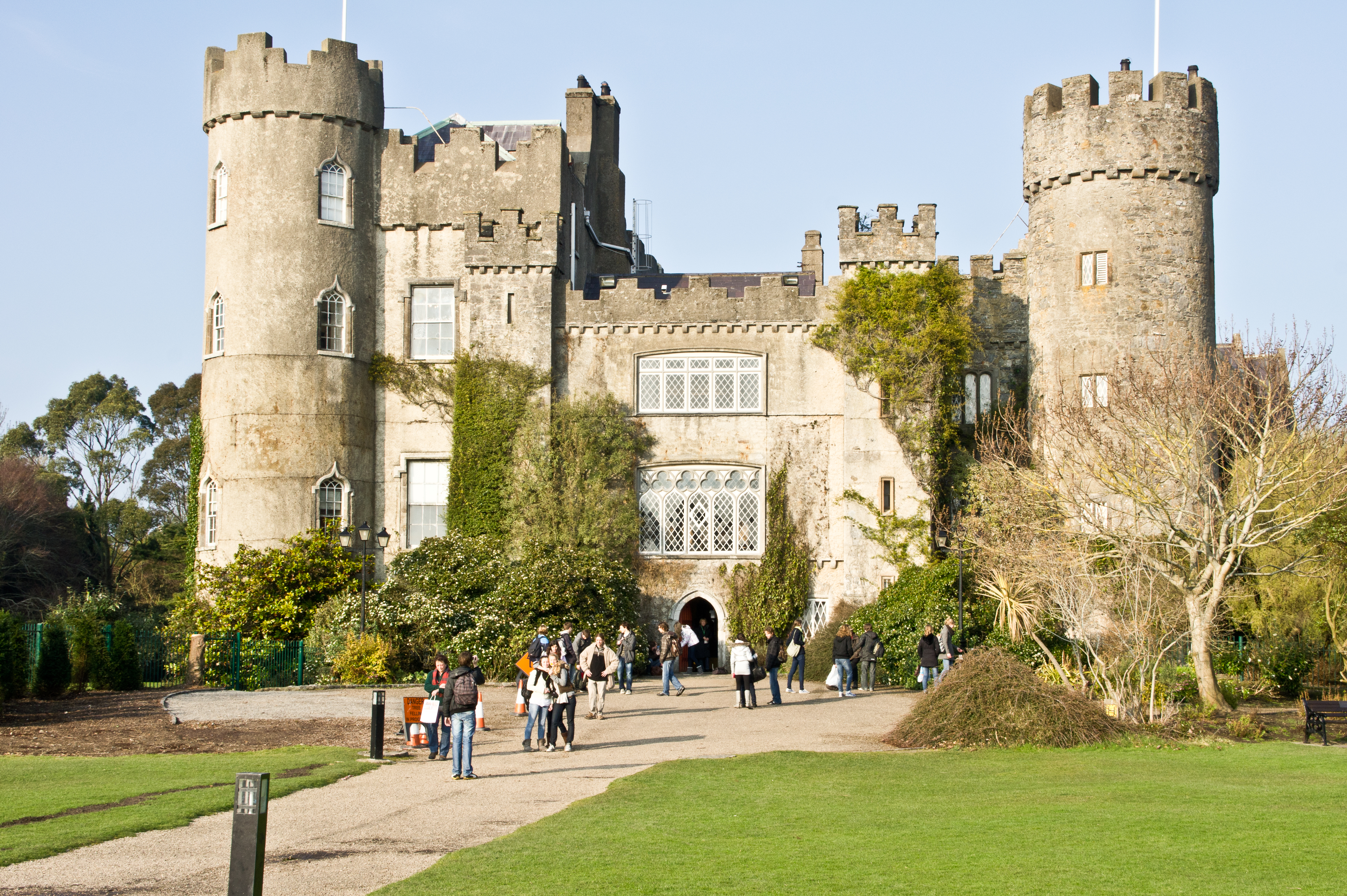
List of castles in Northern Ireland

== Japan ==
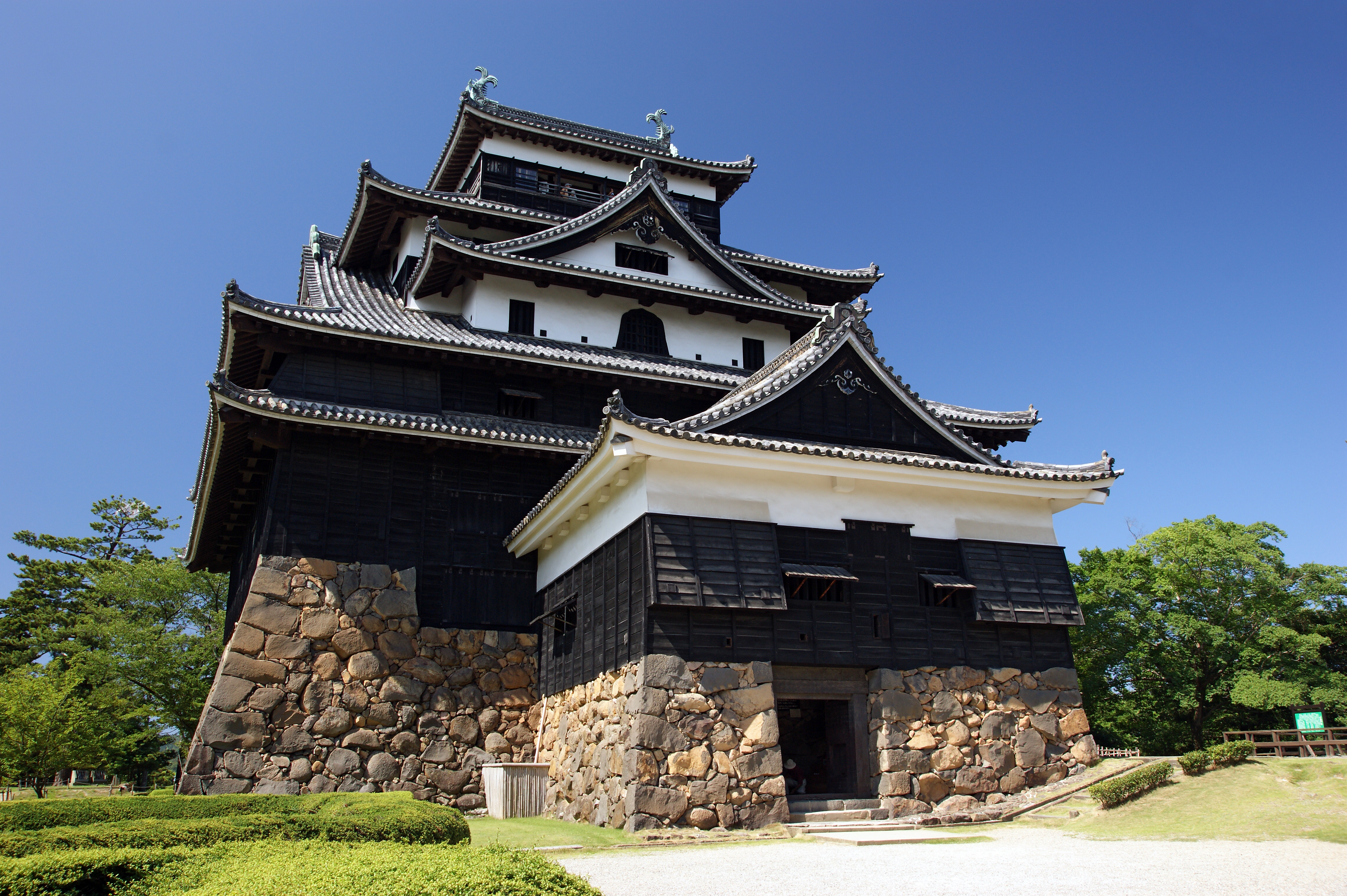
List of castles in Japan

== Jordan ==
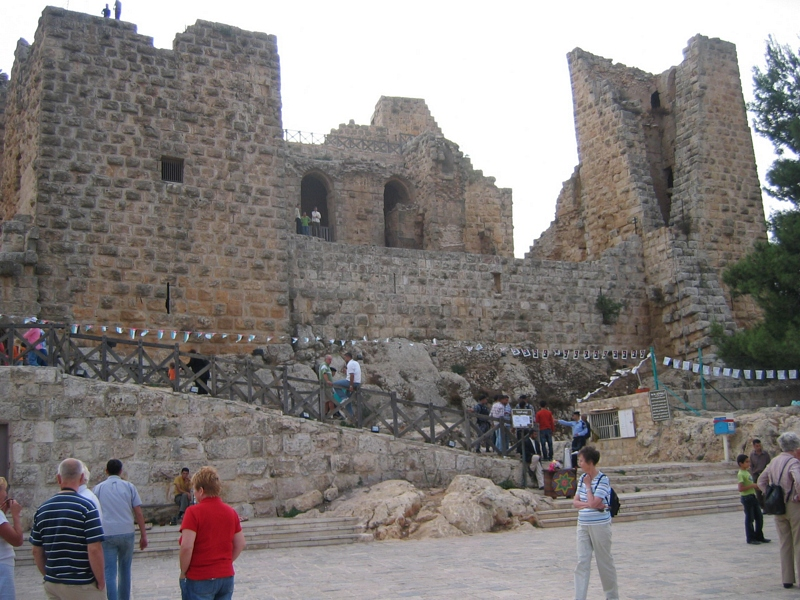
Ajlun Castle, Jordan

== Kenya ==
- Fort Jesus
- Lord Egerton Castle (Ngata)

== Korea ==
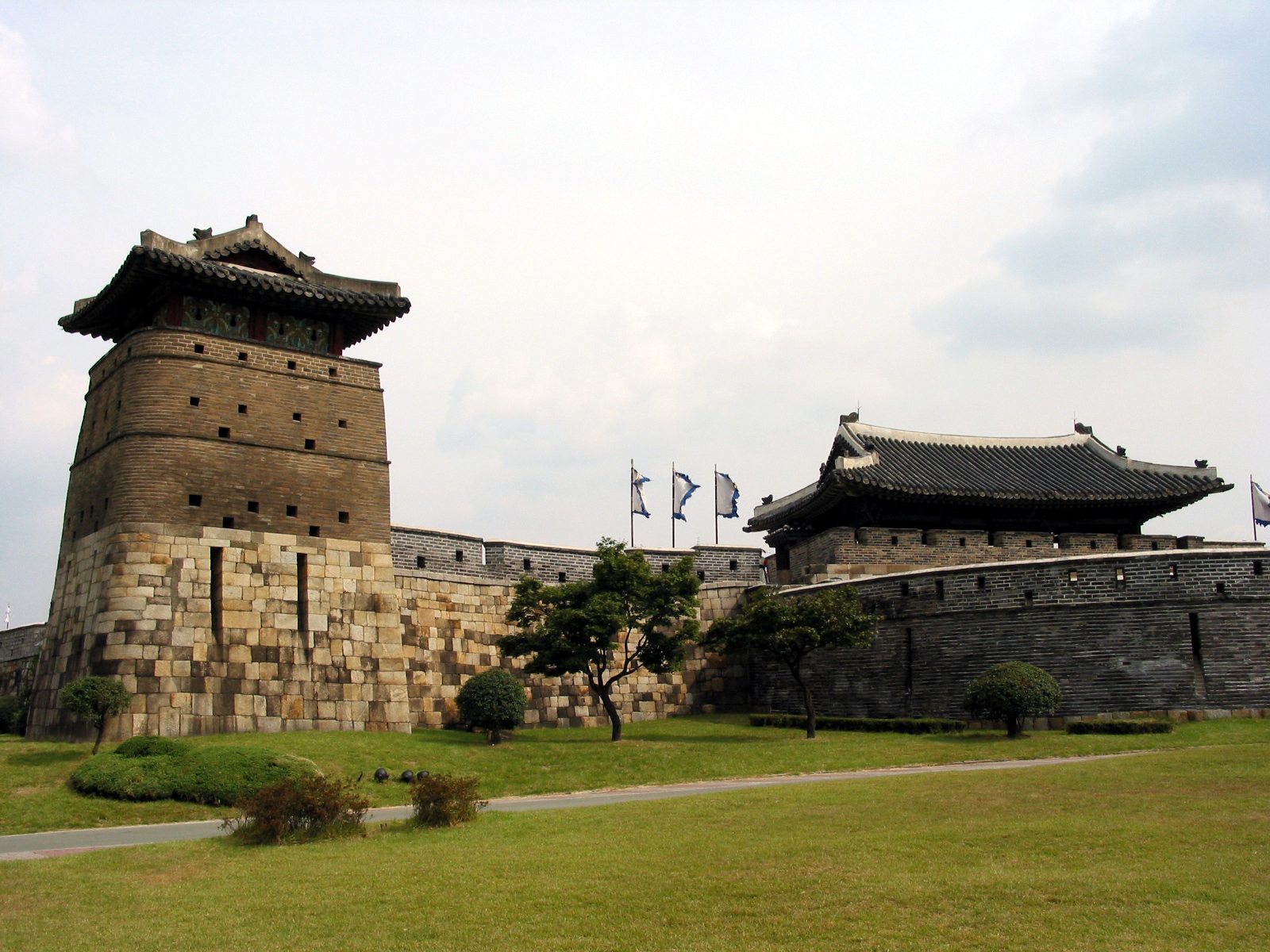
List of castles in Korea

== Lebanon ==
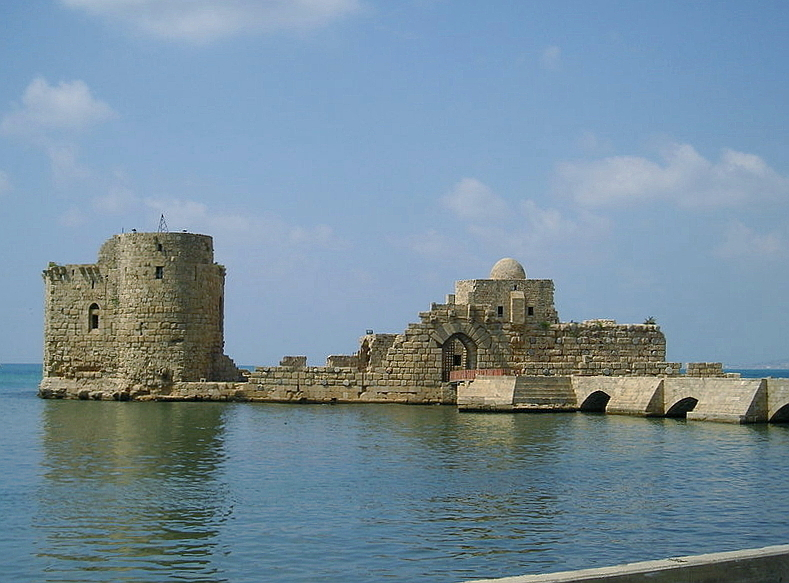
List of castles in Lebanon

== Libya ==
- Murzuk Castle in Murzuk
- Sabha Castle in Sabha
- Red Castle in Tripoli

== Moldova ==
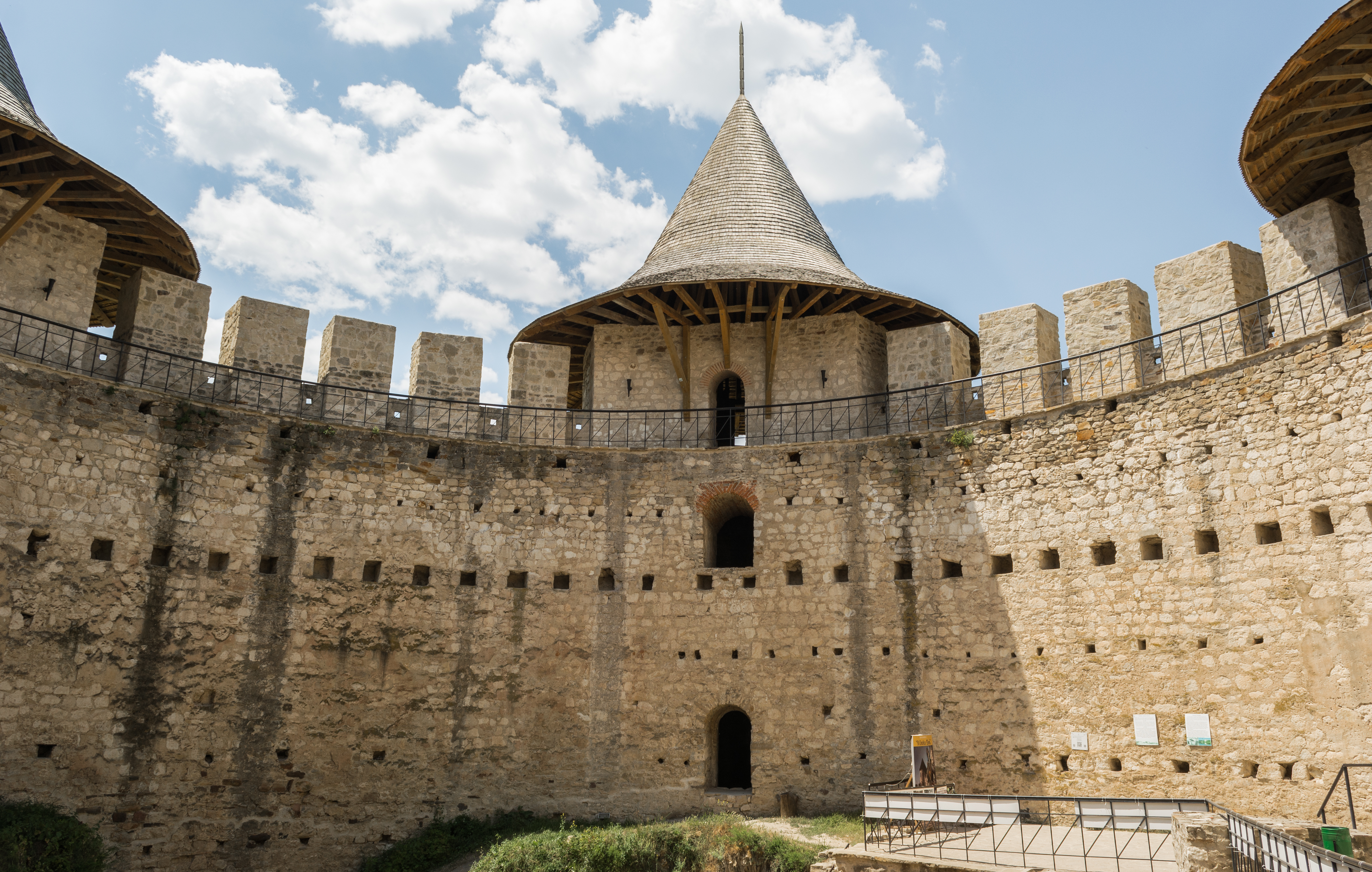
Soroca Fort, Moldova

- Soroca Castle

== Mongolia ==
- Artificial Lake Castle
- Mongol Castle
- Ordu-Baliq
- Sangiin Kerem
- Tsagaan Baishin of Choghtu Khong Tayiji

== Netherlands ==
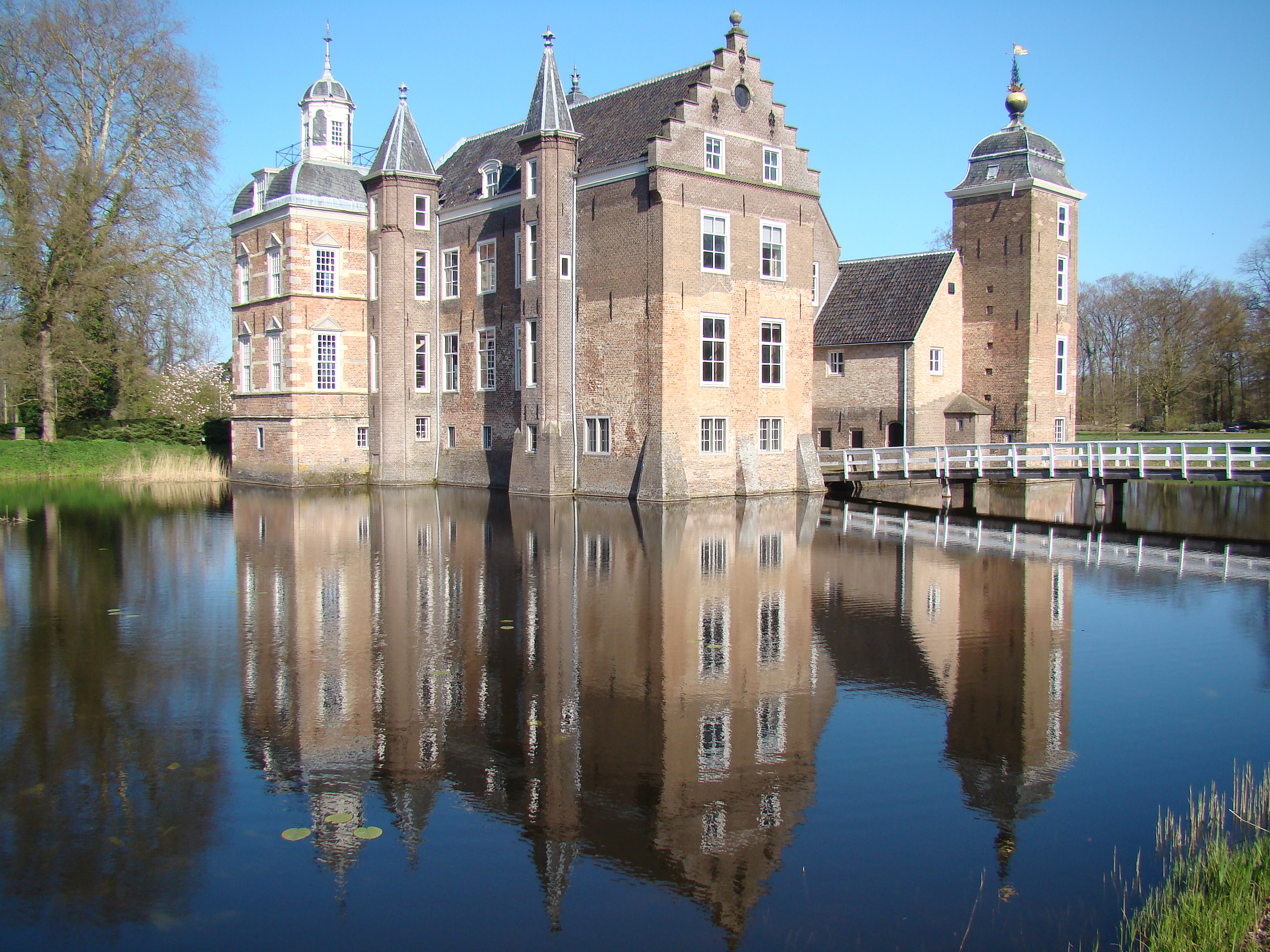
List of castles in the Netherlands

== New Zealand ==
- Cargill's Castle
- Glatisaunt Castle
- Larnach Castle
- Norman Castle
- Pamela Castle
- Riverstone Castle
- The Great Wall Castle
- Warwick House
- Werksworth Castle

== North Macedonia ==
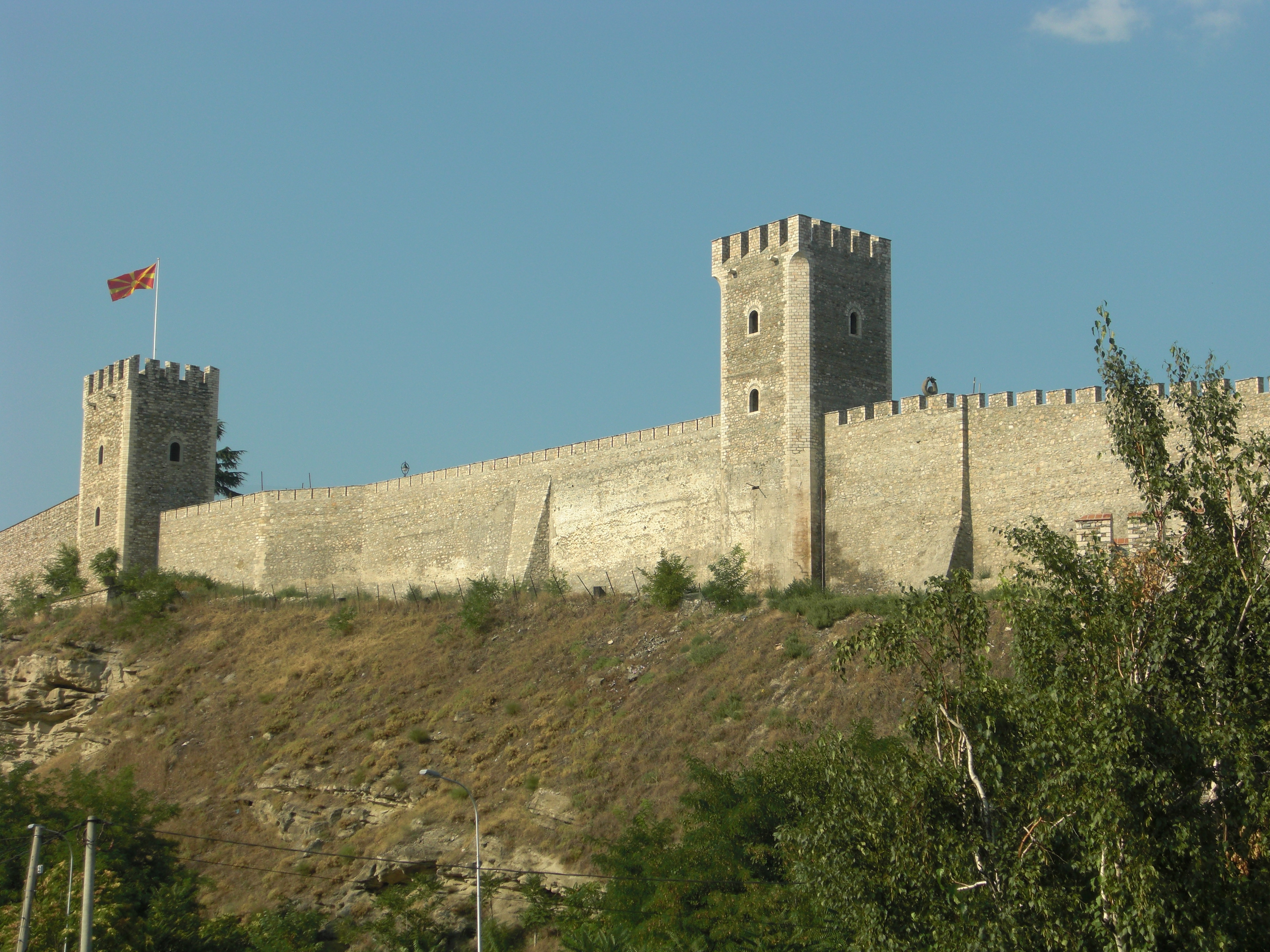
List of castles in North Macedonia

== Oman ==
- Al Hazm Castle
- Jabrin Castle
- Nizwa Castle
- Rustaq Castle

== Pakistan ==
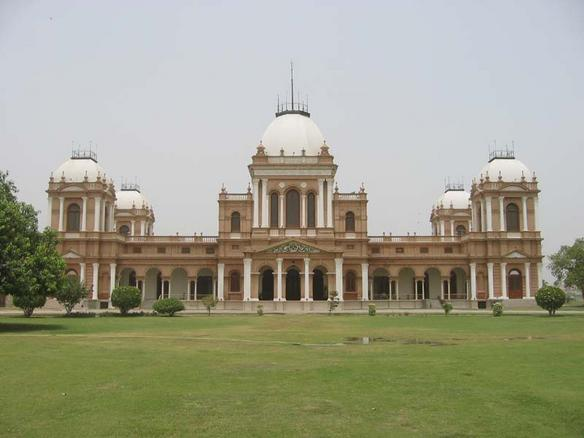
List of castles in Pakistan

== Romania ==
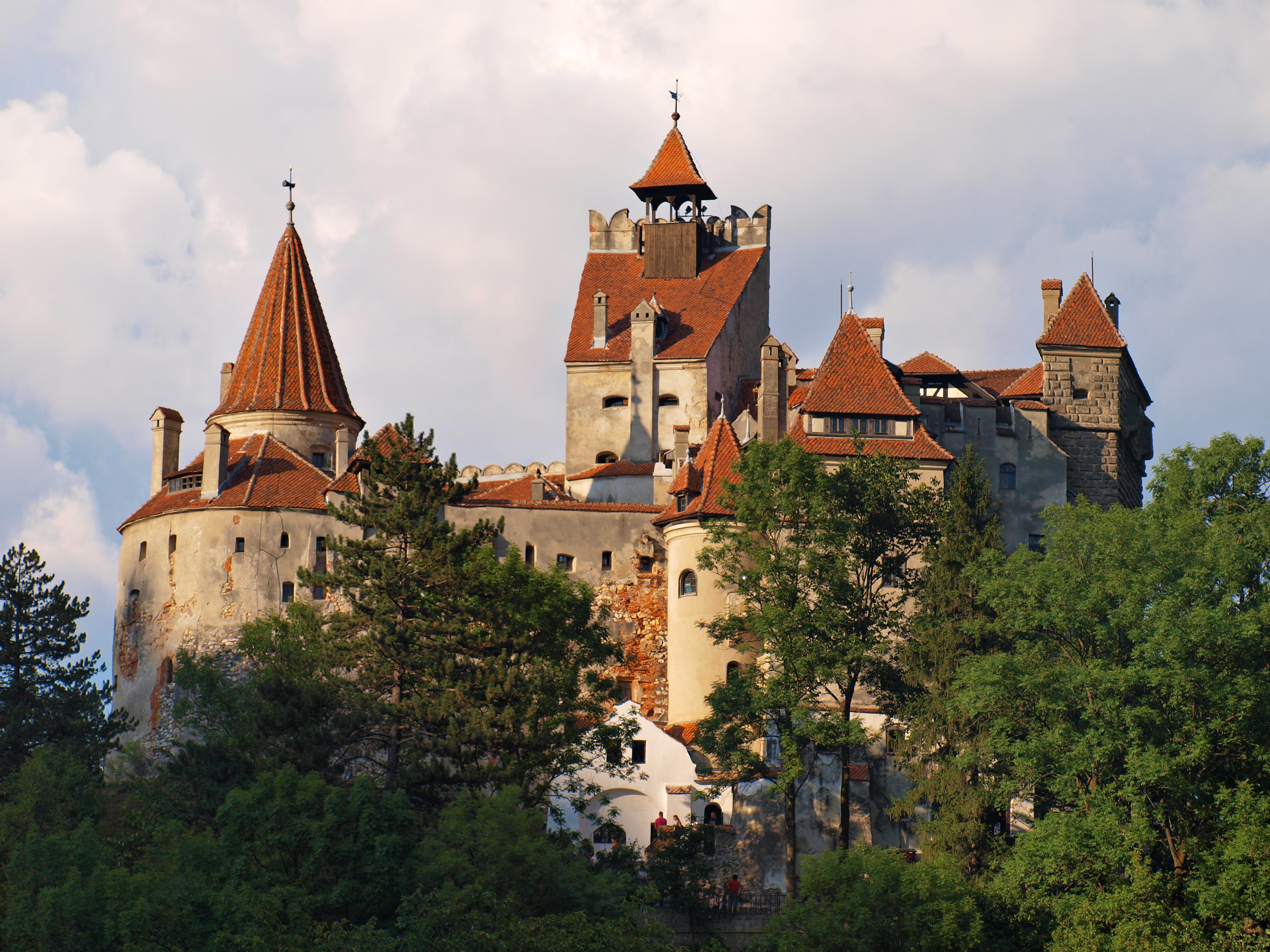
List of castles in Romania

== Slovakia ==
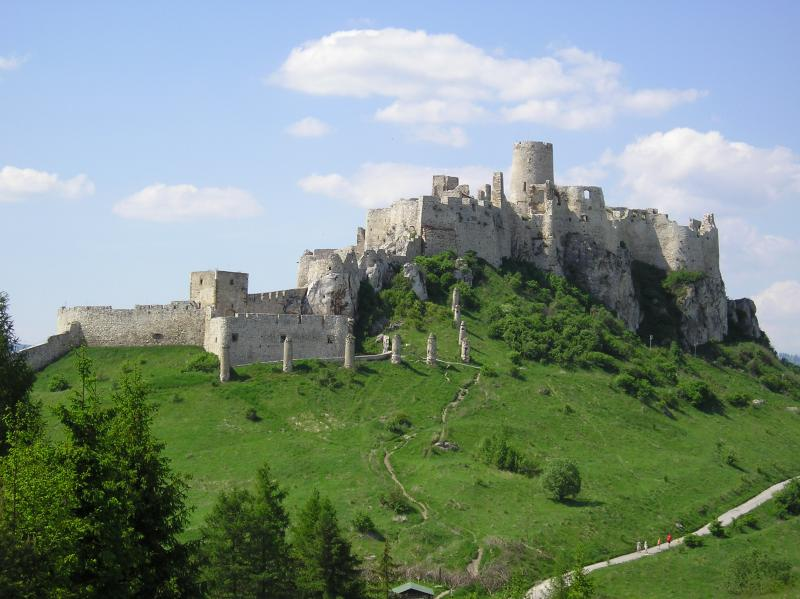
List of castles in Slovakia

== Tibet ==
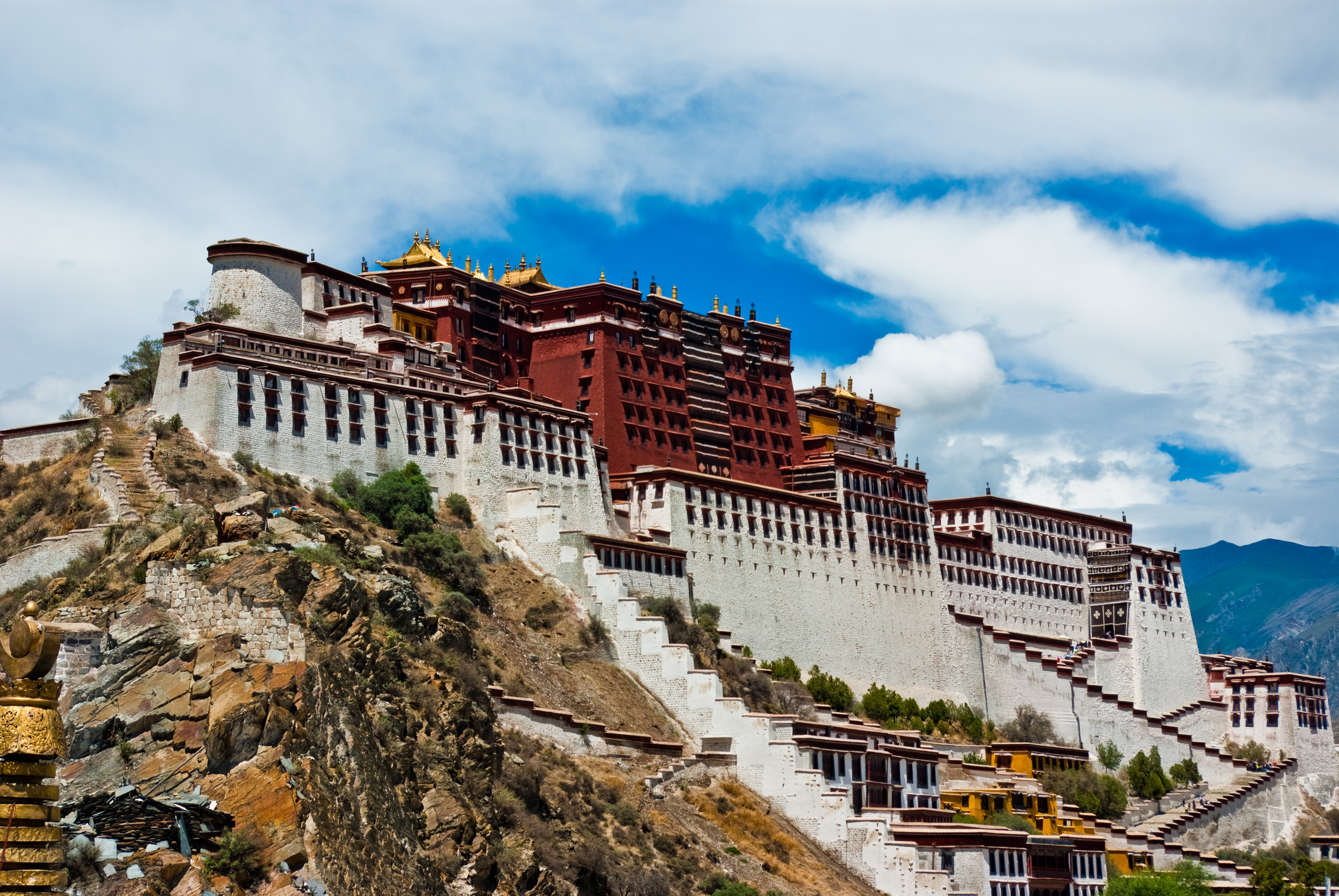
Potala, Tibet

- Potala
- Yungbulakang Castle

== Turkey ==
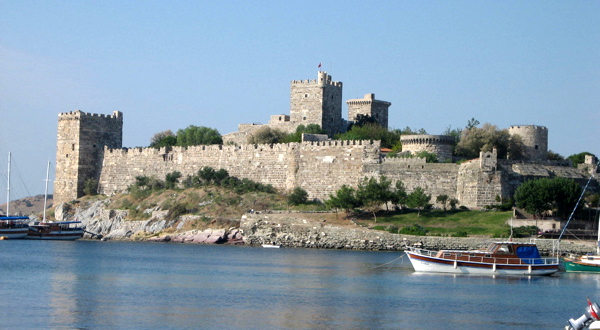
List of castles in Turkey

== United States ==
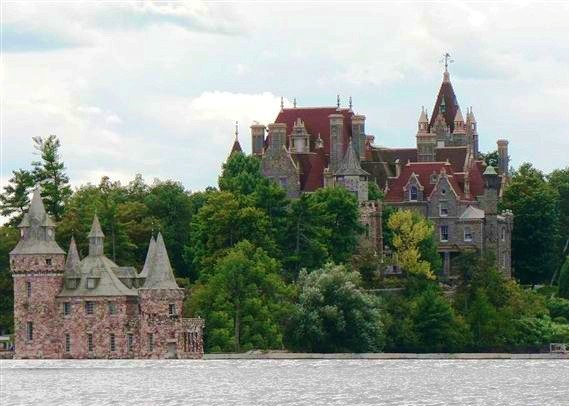
List of castles in the United States
