= Rudolph Novak =

American gymnast (1887–1968)

- Full name: Rudolph Novak
- Born: January 29, 1887 Chroustovice, Bohemia
- Died: October 16, 1968 (aged 81) Cedar Rapids, Iowa, U.S.
- Height: 178 cm (5 ft 10 in)

Gymnastics career
- Discipline: Men's artistic gymnastics
- Country represented: United States
- Gym: Cedar Rapids Sokol

Rudolph Novak (January 29, 1887, in Chroustovice – October 16, 1968, in Cedar Rapids, Iowa) was an American gymnast. He was a member of the United States men's national artistic gymnastics team and competed in the 1924 Summer Olympics.

He was a gymnastics director at Olivet College and raised the popularity of the sport there.

As a gymnast, he was a member of Cedar Rapids Sokol. Following his performance in the 1924 Summer Olympics, he was aboard the RMS Homeric when it encountered a hurricane and he was nearly swept overboard.
