= Uhersko =

- Municipality
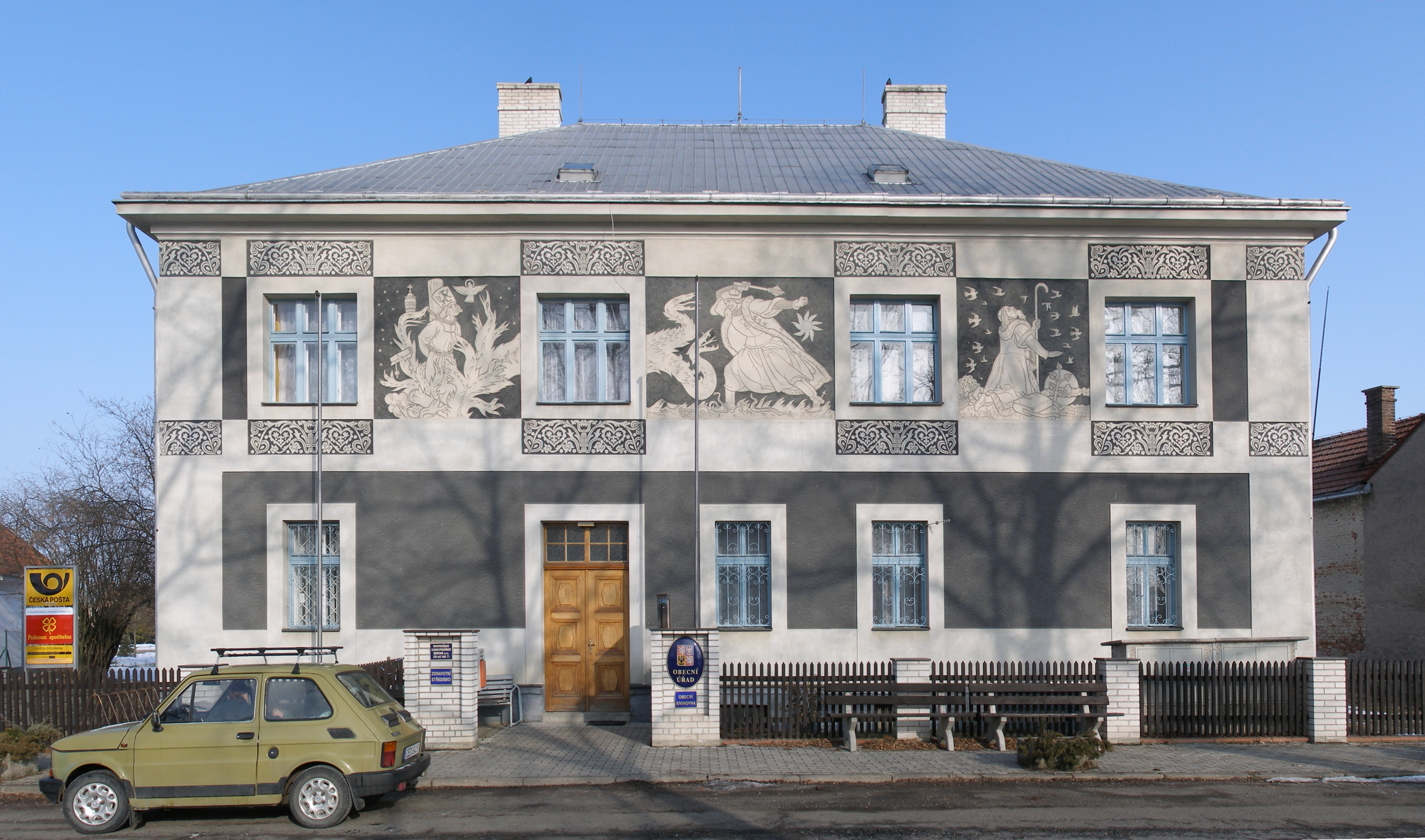
- Municipal office and post office

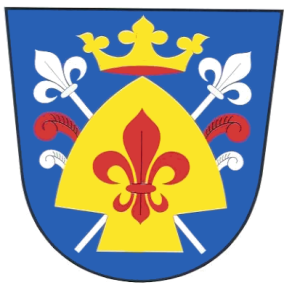
- Flag Coat of arms

- Location in the Czech Republic
- Coordinates: 49°59′33″N 16°1′4″E
- Country: Czech Republic
- Region: Pardubice
- District: Pardubice
- First mentioned: 1308

Area
  - Total: 3.67 km^{2} (1.42 sq mi)
- Elevation: 252 m (827 ft)

Population (2026-01-01)
  - Total: 304
  - Density: 82.8/km^{2} (215/sq mi)
- Time zone: UTC+1 (CET)
  - Summer (DST): UTC+2 (CEST)
- Postal code: 533 73
- Website: www.uhersko.cz

Uhersko a municipality and village in Pardubice District in the Pardubice Region of the Czech Republic. It has about 300 inhabitants.

== History ==
The first written mention of Uhersko is from 1308.

== Demographics ==
Historical population
Year	Pop.	±%
1869	453	—
1880	439	−3.1%
1890	470	+7.1%
1900	430	−8.5%
1910	421	−2.1%
1921	414	−1.7%
1930	419	+1.2%
1950	330	−21.2%
1961	363	+10.0%
1970	340	−6.3%
1980	276	−18.8%
1991	251	−9.1%
2001	266	+6.0%
2011	272	+2.3%
2021	296	+8.8%
Source: Censuses

== Sights ==
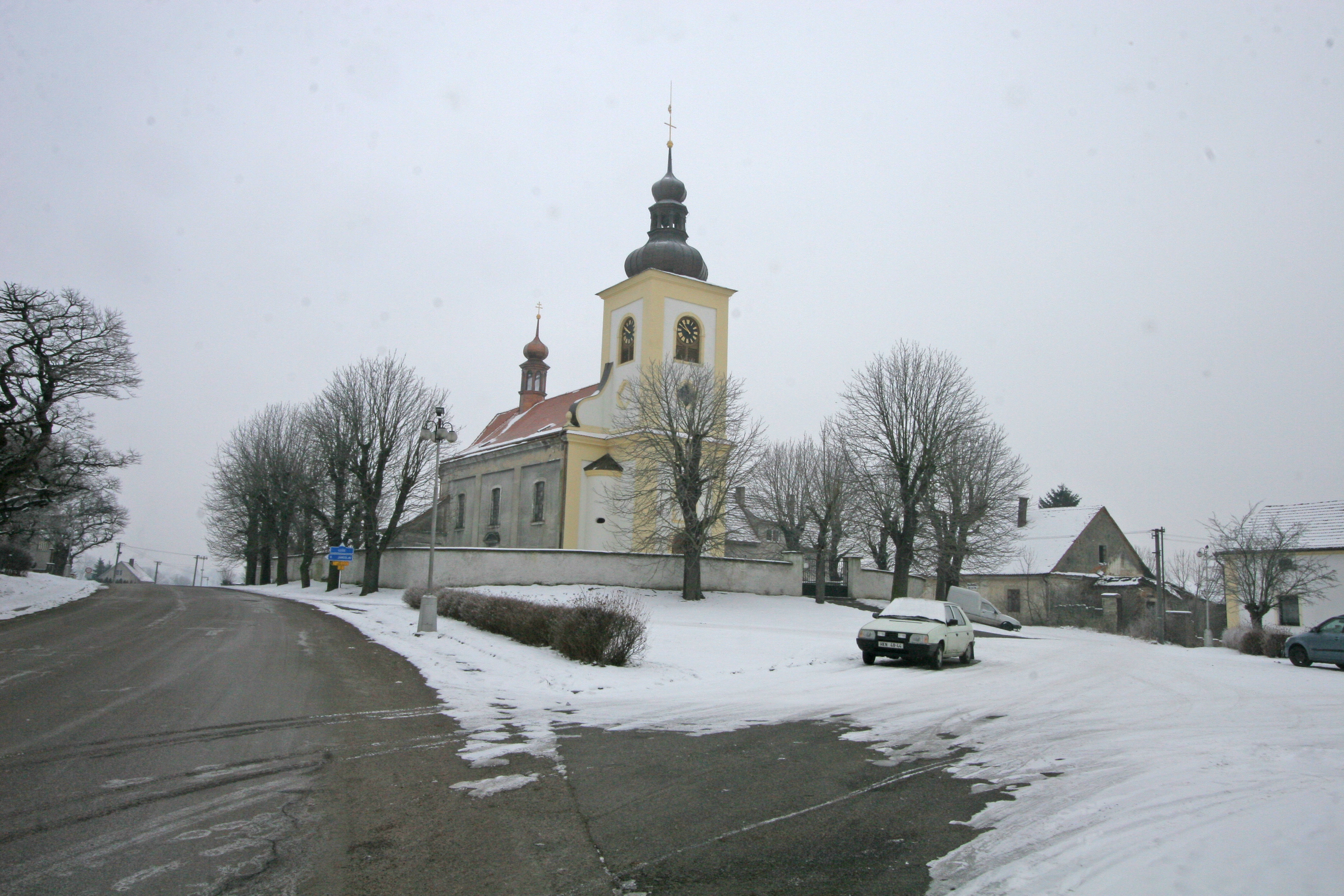
Church of the Assumption of the Virgin Mary

The main landmark of Uhersko is the Church of the Assumption of the Virgin Mary. It was built in the Baroque style in 1704.
