= Rabštejnek Castle =

Coordinates: 49°54′16.7″N 15°45′10.6″E

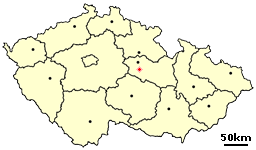
Location of Rabštejnek Castle in the Czech Republic

Rabštejnek Castle is a ruined castle in Rabštejnská Lhota in the Pardubice Region of the Czech Republic.

== History ==
The Gothic style castle was constructed on a small rock during first half of the 14th century for a local nobleman. The name originates in German Rabenstein, meaning raven's nest (because of resemblance of a nest). Current form of the name was used since cca 1450. Castle ownership had changed frequently between several noble families, the king and town Chrudim. Toward the end of the 16th century the place was reported as abandoned. During the second half of the 19th century the ruins were reconstructed in romantic style to serve as a shelter for hunts by local nobility.

A rectangular dungeon (donjon, a tower), narrowly sized building and smaller tower on opposite side were cramped on the rock. The structures were designed high because of lack of space. Rectangular rampart was surrounded by a moat. The inbuilt structure added in the 19th century had pseudo-Romanesque windows decorated by sgraffiti.

Before World War II remnants of the castle were maintained. After the war it was nationalized, the furniture moved out and the rest left to decay.

== Tourism ==
Today, the ruins are freely accessible.
