= Burg Blomendal =

Castle in Bremen, Germany

Coordinates: 53.1846°N 8.5814°E

Burg Blomendal (also known as Hus Blomendal or Haus Blomendal) is a medieval moated castle in the Bremen district of Blumenthal (Bremen) and the oldest secular building in Bremen. The name Blomendal is the Low German spelling of Blumenthal. The castle complex is located at the confluence of Blumenthaler Aue and Beckedorfer Beeke.

The building and outbuildings (19th century) have been under monument protection since 1973.

== History ==
In the 13th century, the knights von Oumünde (von Aumund) built the first Burg zu Blomendal on the Burgberg above the Aue valley in the area of Lüssum, which was destroyed in 1305 during the Bremen Council Feud. In 1354, the knights built the second Burg Blomendal. The owners mentioned were the lords von Oumünde, Diderich von Reken, and Johann von der Hude.

In 1436, the knights Johann and Otto von Borch sold "dat slot Blomendale" for 1400 Rhineland guilders to the Bremen Council. Bremen leased the house with its extensive income to deserving councilors or mayors for ten years each.

In 1542, the Bremen mayor Diedrich Hoyer the Elder moved into Blomendal as a lessee. His son Erich Hoyer, also a Bremen mayor, commissioned the still-preserved ceiling painting.

From the 16th century onwards, Burg Blomendal served only as an administrative and judicial seat, becoming the "Amt Blomendal". From 1638 to 1652, Johann Hoppe served here as a meritorious bailiff; a street in Blumenthal was named after him.

In the run-up to the First Bremen-Swedish War in 1653, Swedish troops under Count Königsmarck occupied this castle (now called "Haus Blomendal"), as well as the places Lesum and Burg.

In the Second Stade Compromise of 1742, Haus Blomendal was separated from its connection to Bremen and awarded to the Electorate of Brunswick-Lüneburg.

With the annexation of the Kingdom of Hanover by Prussia in 1866, Blumenthal also came under Prussian administration. Under district administrator Paul Berthold, the district office of the Blumenthal district was established in Haus Blomendal in 1884. As part of the incorporation of Blumenthal into Bremen, Burg Blomendal fell back to Bremen in 1939.

== Current use ==
After extensive restoration in the 1970s, the castle currently houses the archive rooms of the Heimatverein Blumenthal e. V. and a kindergarten. The premises are used for concerts, stage plays, lectures, private celebrations, conferences, and exhibitions. Burg Blomendal is located in the immediate vicinity of the Station Bremen-Blumenthal of the NordWestBahn route Vegesack–Farge as well as the Bahnhof Blumenthal bus stop for bus lines 90 to 92 and 94 to 97 of the Bremer Straßenbahn AG.

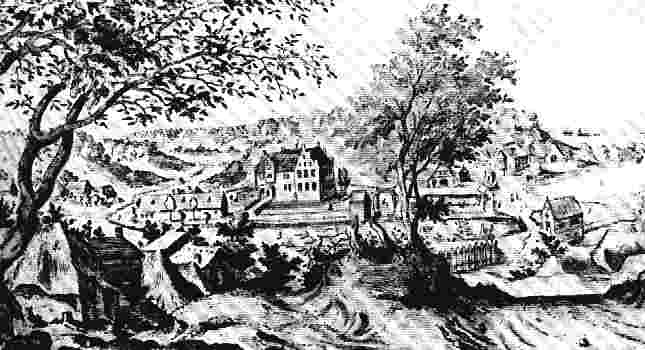
Moated Castle Blumenthal, 1600 after Wilhelm Dilich

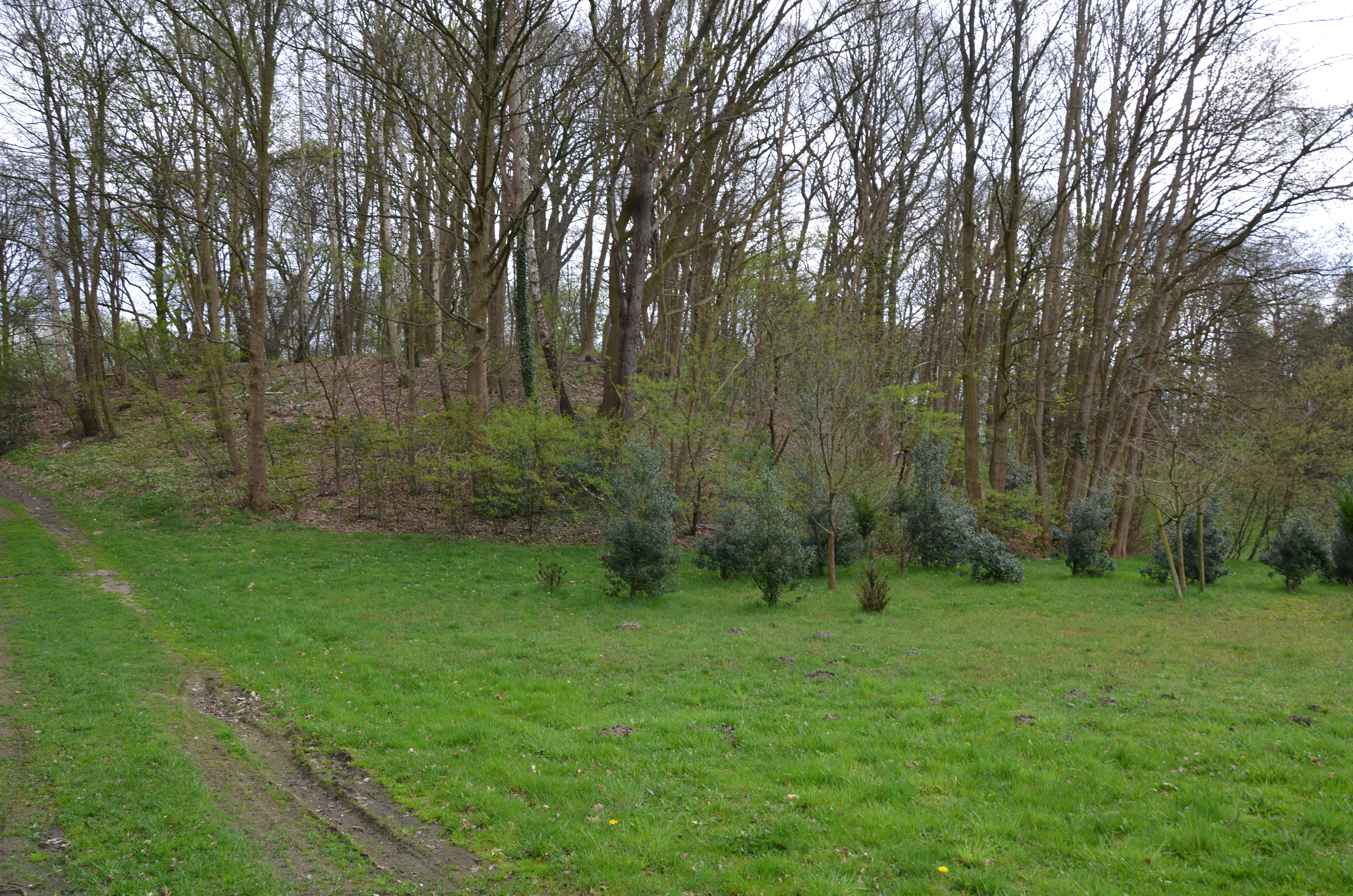
Area of the old Burgberg

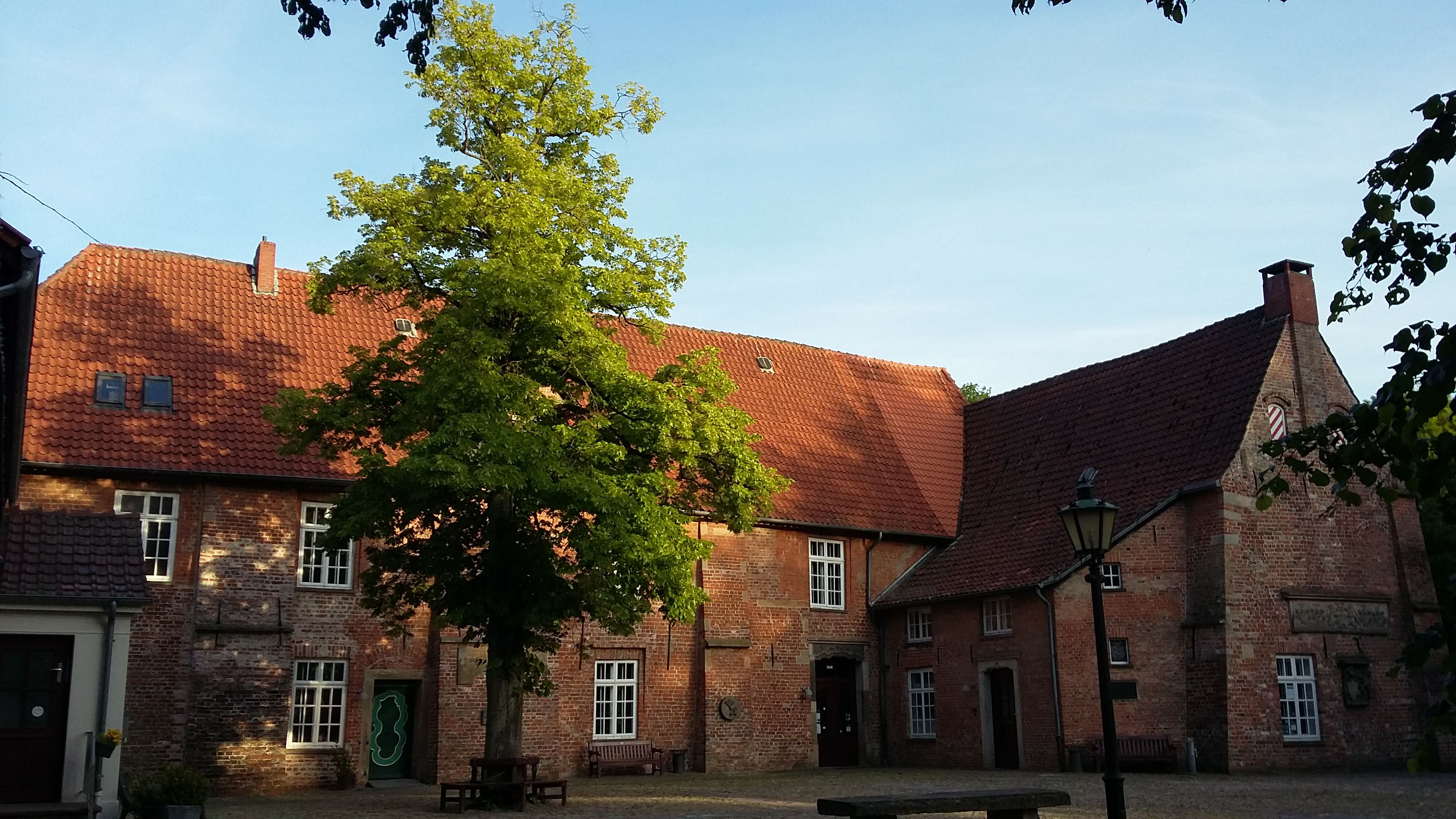
Castle courtyard

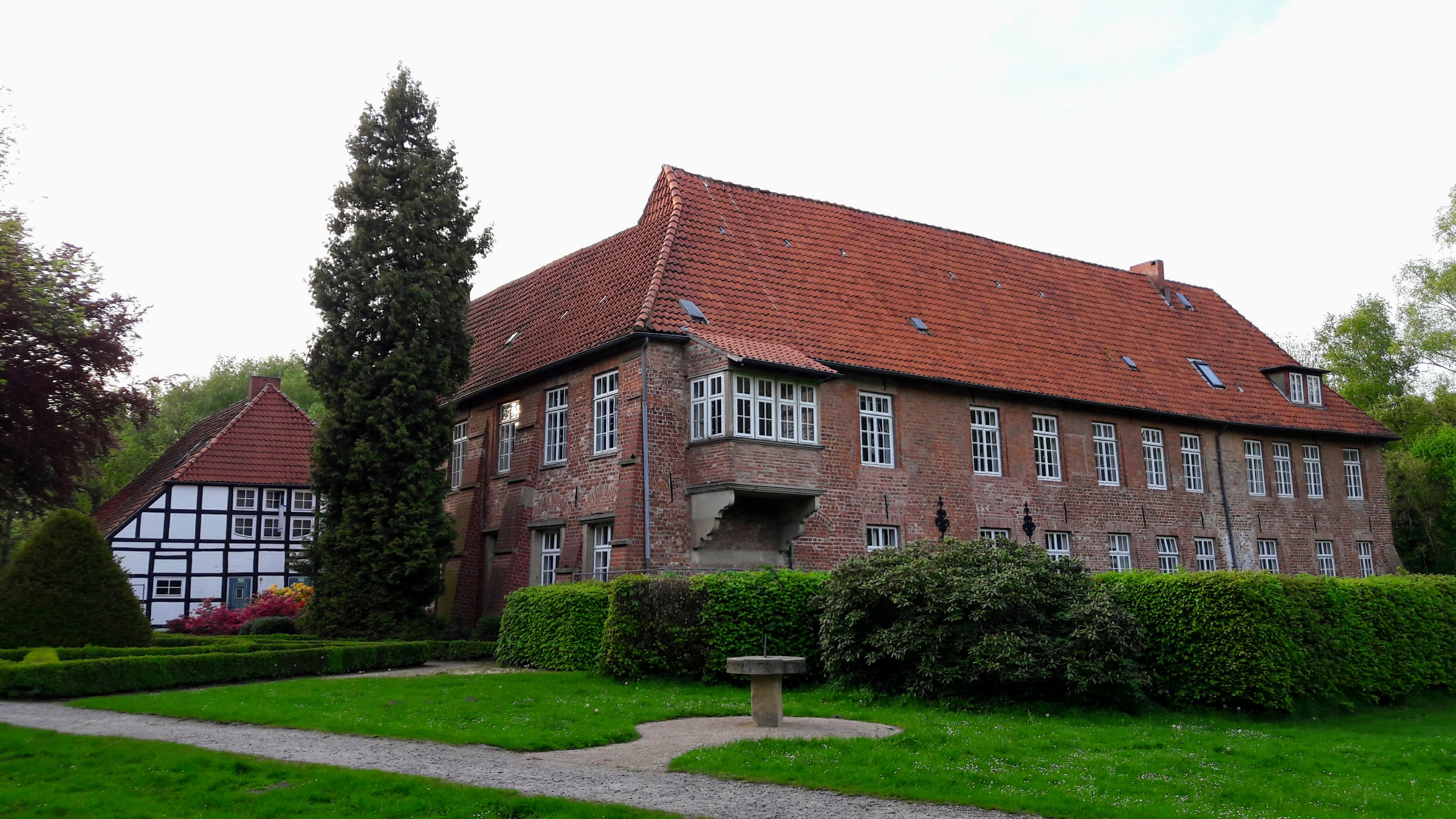
View from the south of the castle
