= Boršov =

- Municipality
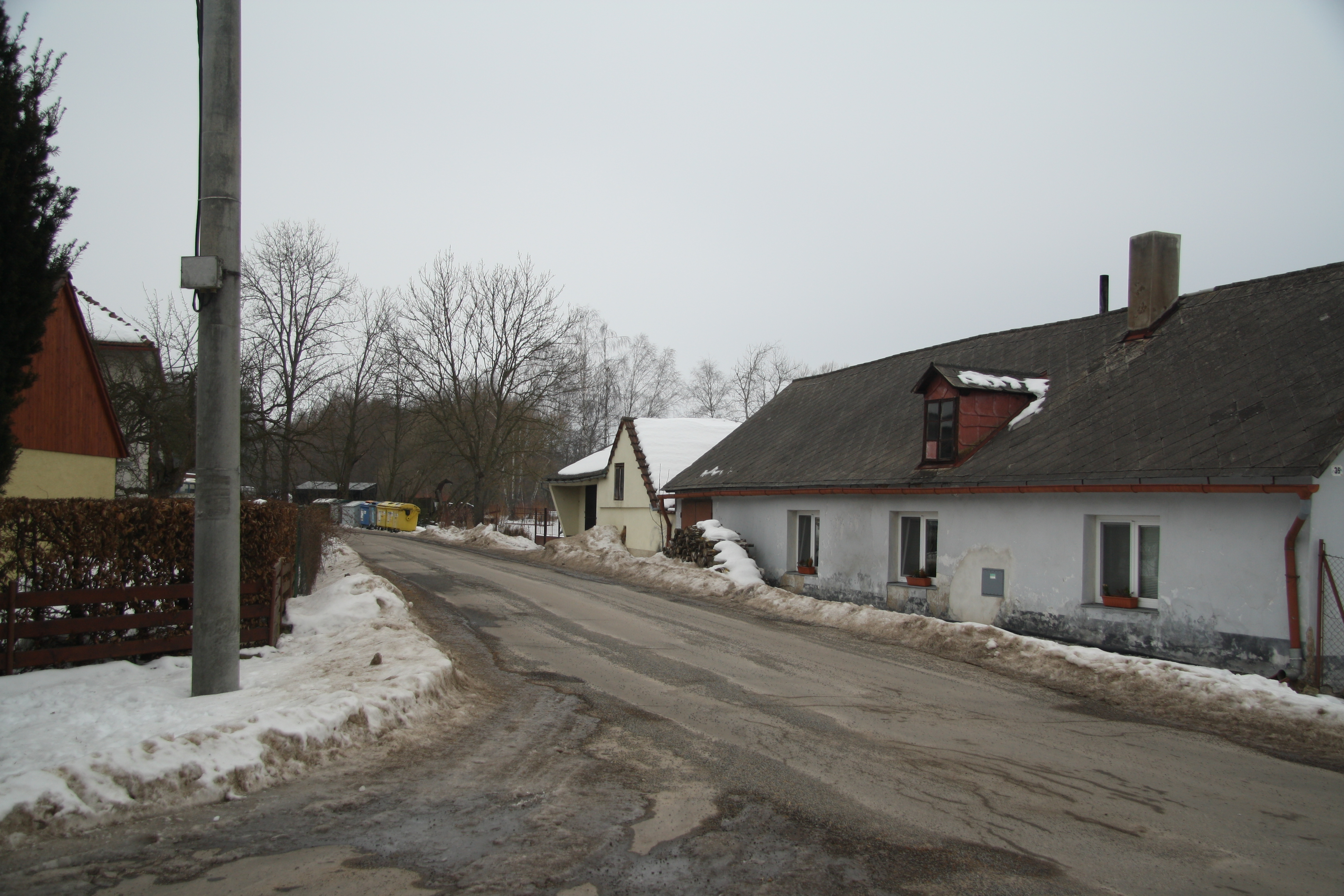
- Centre of Boršov

- Location in the Czech Republic
- Coordinates: 49°24′14″N 15°26′3″E
- Country: Czech Republic
- Region: Vysočina
- District: Jihlava
- First mentioned: 1379

Area
  - Total: 2.57 km^{2} (0.99 sq mi)
- Elevation: 602 m (1,975 ft)

Population (2026-01-01)
  - Total: 184
  - Density: 71.6/km^{2} (185/sq mi)
- Time zone: UTC+1 (CET)
  - Summer (DST): UTC+2 (CEST)
- Postal code: 588 05
- Website: www.obecborsov.cz

Boršov (Czech pronunciation: [ˈborʃof]; German: Borschau) is a municipality and village in Jihlava District in the Vysočina Region of the Czech Republic. It has about 200 inhabitants.

Boršov lies approximately 11 kilometres (7 mi) west of Jihlava and 107 km (66 mi) southeast of Prague.

== Demographics ==
Historical population
Year	Pop.	±%
1869	238	—
1880	235	−1.3%
1890	265	+12.8%
1900	291	+9.8%
1910	305	+4.8%
1921	272	−10.8%
1930	241	−11.4%
1950	187	−22.4%
1961	186	−0.5%
1970	164	−11.8%
1980	131	−20.1%
1991	110	−16.0%
2001	104	−5.5%
2011	158	+51.9%
2021	158	+0.0%
Source: Censuses
