= Žumberk Castle =

Czech castle

Coordinates: 49°52′17.26″N 15°51′24.25″E

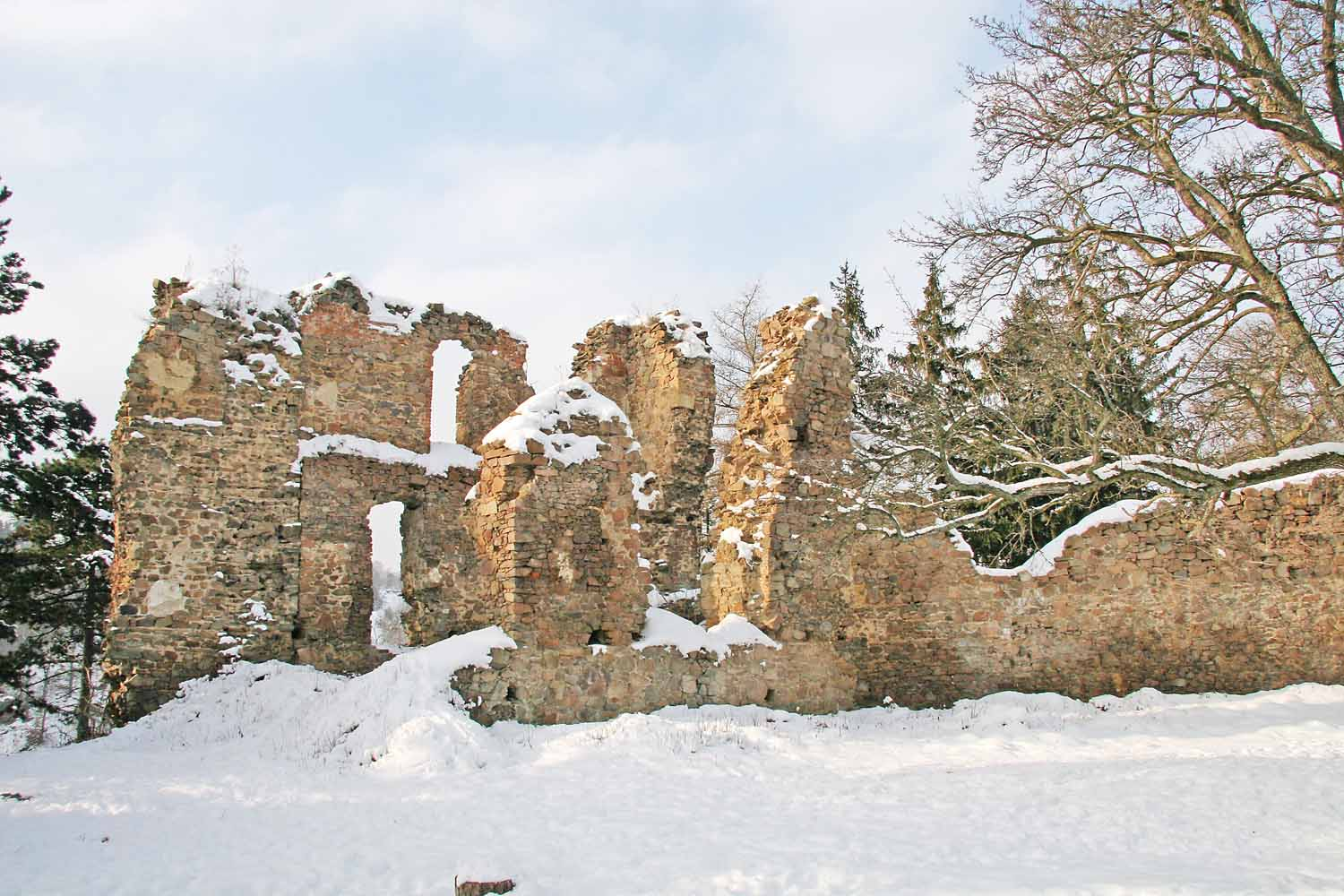
Ruins of the castle in winter

The ruins of Žumberk Castle (Czech: Hrad Žumberk, German: Burg Sonnenberg) are located next to the market town of Žumberk in the Pardubice Region of the Czech Republic.

== History ==
The castle was probably built during the end of the 13th century, on a hilltop above the village, and was known under the German name Sunenberg (or Sonnenberg, later Sommerberg), which means sun (German = Sonne) mountain (or later namend summer (German = Sommer) mountain). Its walls formed a pentagon and were surrounded by a deep moat, with a service yard was placed next to the castle. Later, a township grew up under the hill.

The first known owner of the castle and neighbouring villages was a robber knight; ownership of the castle changed many times afterwards. At the beginning of the 18th century, the castle was not inhabited, though during 1760–70 a physician lived there. The castle became desolate and was left to be a source of construction material.

During 1926–48 the castle was owned by the Club of Czech Tourists, and its structure was stabilized to prevent further destruction. Today the market town of Žumberk is responsible for its maintenance, and access to the castle is unlimited and free.
