= Zámrsk =

- Municipality
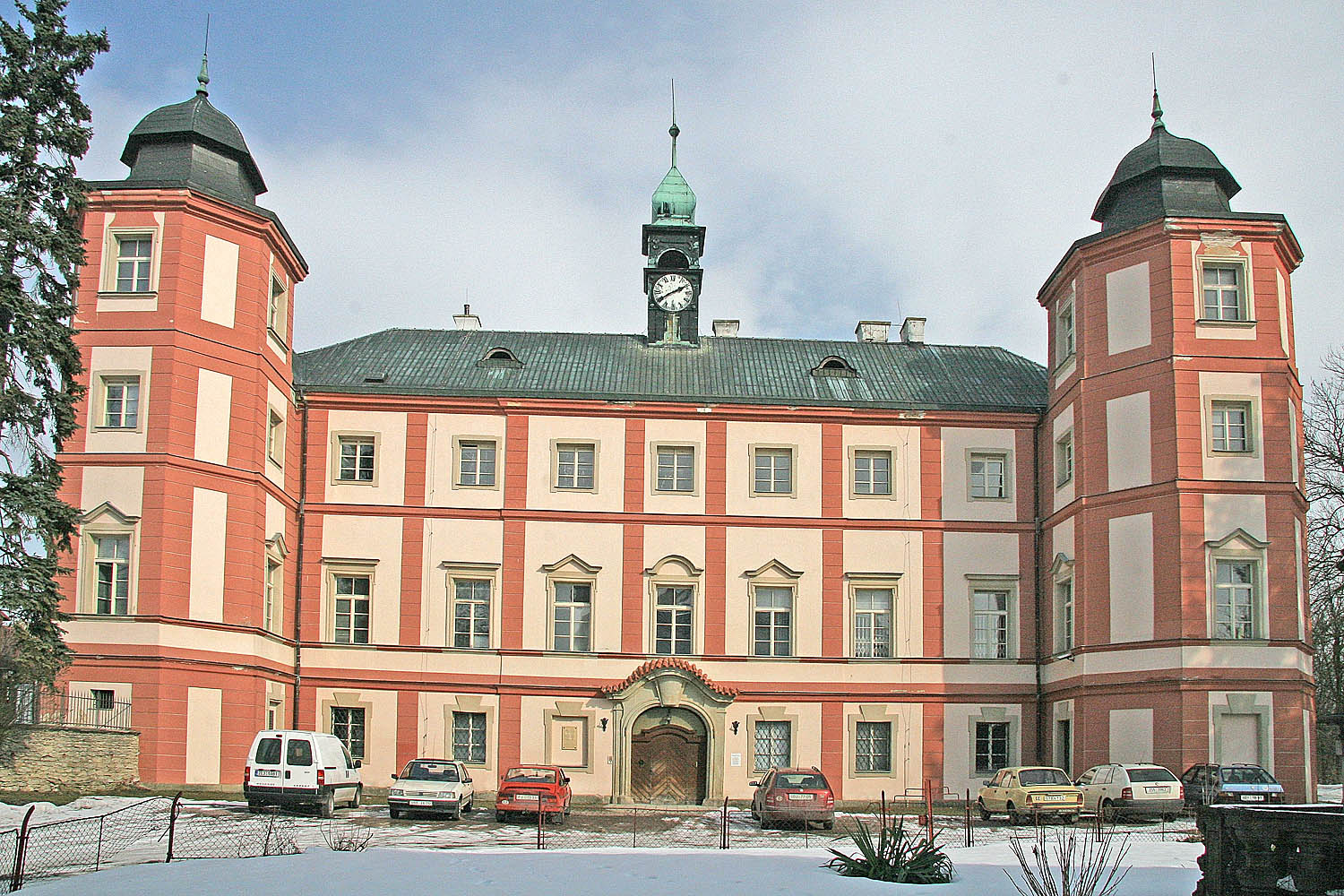
- Zámrsk Castle

- Flag Coat of arms

- Location in the Czech Republic
- Coordinates: 49°59′10″N 16°7′44″E
- Country: Czech Republic
- Region: Pardubice
- District: Ústí nad Orlicí
- First mentioned: 1349

Area
  - Total: 7.47 km^{2} (2.88 sq mi)
- Elevation: 260 m (850 ft)

Population (2026-01-01)
  - Total: 765
  - Density: 102/km^{2} (265/sq mi)
- Time zone: UTC+1 (CET)
  - Summer (DST): UTC+2 (CEST)
- Postal code: 565 43
- Website: www.zamrsk.cz

Zámrsk is a municipality and village in Ústí nad Orlicí District in the Pardubice Region of the Czech Republic. It has about 800 inhabitants.

Zámrsk lies approximately 20 kilometres (12 mi) west of Ústí nad Orlicí, 26 kilometres (16 mi) east of Pardubice, and 123 kilometres (76 mi) east of Prague.

== Administrative division ==
Zámrsk consists of three municipal parts (in brackets population according to the 2021 census):

- Zámrsk (434)
- Janovičky (99)
- Nová Ves (184)

== Demographics ==
Historical population
Year	Pop.	±%
1869	1,076	—
1880	1,010	−6.1%
1890	963	−4.7%
1900	860	−10.7%
1910	968	+12.6%
1921	957	−1.1%
1930	969	+1.3%
1950	1,057	+9.1%
1961	920	−13.0%
1970	873	−5.1%
1980	704	−19.4%
1991	687	−2.4%
2001	710	+3.3%
2011	724	+2.0%
2021	717	−1.0%
Source: Censuses
