= Senftenberg (disambiguation) =

Senftenberg may refer to:

- Senftenberg, a town in southern Brandenburg, Germany
- Senftenberg, Austria
- Žamberk, a town in the Pardubice Region of the Czech Republic, known as Senftenberg in German
