= Václav F. Kumpošt =

Václav Kumpošt
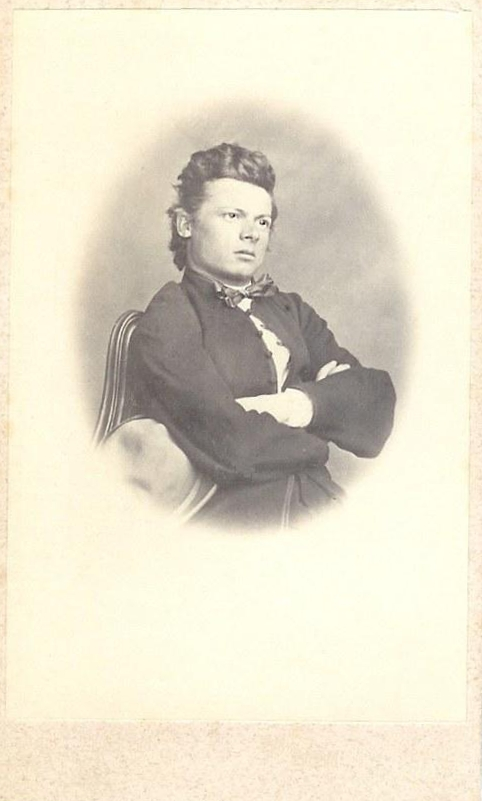
- Václav F. Kumpošt
- Born: 1846; Žamberk, Austrian Empire
- Died: 26 February 1874 (aged 27–28); Prague, Austria-Hungary
- Education: University of Prague

Václav F. Kumpošt (1846–1874) was founder of the magazine Vesmír.

Václav Kumpošt was born in Žamberk and spent his childhood in the family of clockmaker Albert. He grew up there with stepbrother Eduard Albert who was a famous surgeon and with other siblings (František Albert, Tereza Svatová and Kateřina Thomová). He studied medicine on University in Prague and is known as founder of the magazine Vesmír (1871). He died of tuberculosis on 26 February 1874 at general hospital in Prague.
