= Antonio Grossich =

Italian surgeon, politician, and writer

Antonio Grossich

Antonio Grossich (7 June 1849 – 1 October 1926) was an Italian surgeon from Fiume (now Rijeka, Croatia), a politician, and a writer.

Born in Draguć (Draguccio d'Istria), halfway between Buzet (Pinguente) and Pazin (Pisino), Istria, Grossich at first studied law in Graz, but then shifted to medicine in Vienna, graduating in 1875. He at first (1876–1878) worked as a physician in Kastav, close to Fiume. Antonio Grossich was mobilised and took part in the Austrian campaign in Bosnia in 1878, serving in the Austrian army as Oberarzt. In 1879, he came to Fiume but went back to Vienna in 1884 to specialize in surgery and obstetrical medicine. There, he worked at the First Surgery Clinic of the University of Vienna with Karel Maydl. He practised obstetrical medicine under the supervision of Eduard Albert, who from 1873 to 1881 was a professor of surgery in Innsbruck, where he introduced mandatory antiseptic treatment for wounds. In 1886, he became Chief of the Surgery Division at the City Hospital of Fiume. Grossich was among the first to use sterilisation of the operative field and, in 1908, tincture of iodine was introduced by Grossich as a way for rapid sterilization of the human skin in the surgical field. It was tested on a mass level during the Italo-Turkish War of 1912. For this reason, he was awarded with the Order of the Crown of Italy and became a surgeon. Grossich was involved in the political life of the city, taking an Italian irredentist stance, eventually becoming the head of the Italian National Council of Fiume in 1918. In 1924, he consigned the Key to the City to Italian King Victor Emmanuel III on the day of the official annexation of Fiume to Italy, where he later died.
