= Museum of old machines and technologies =

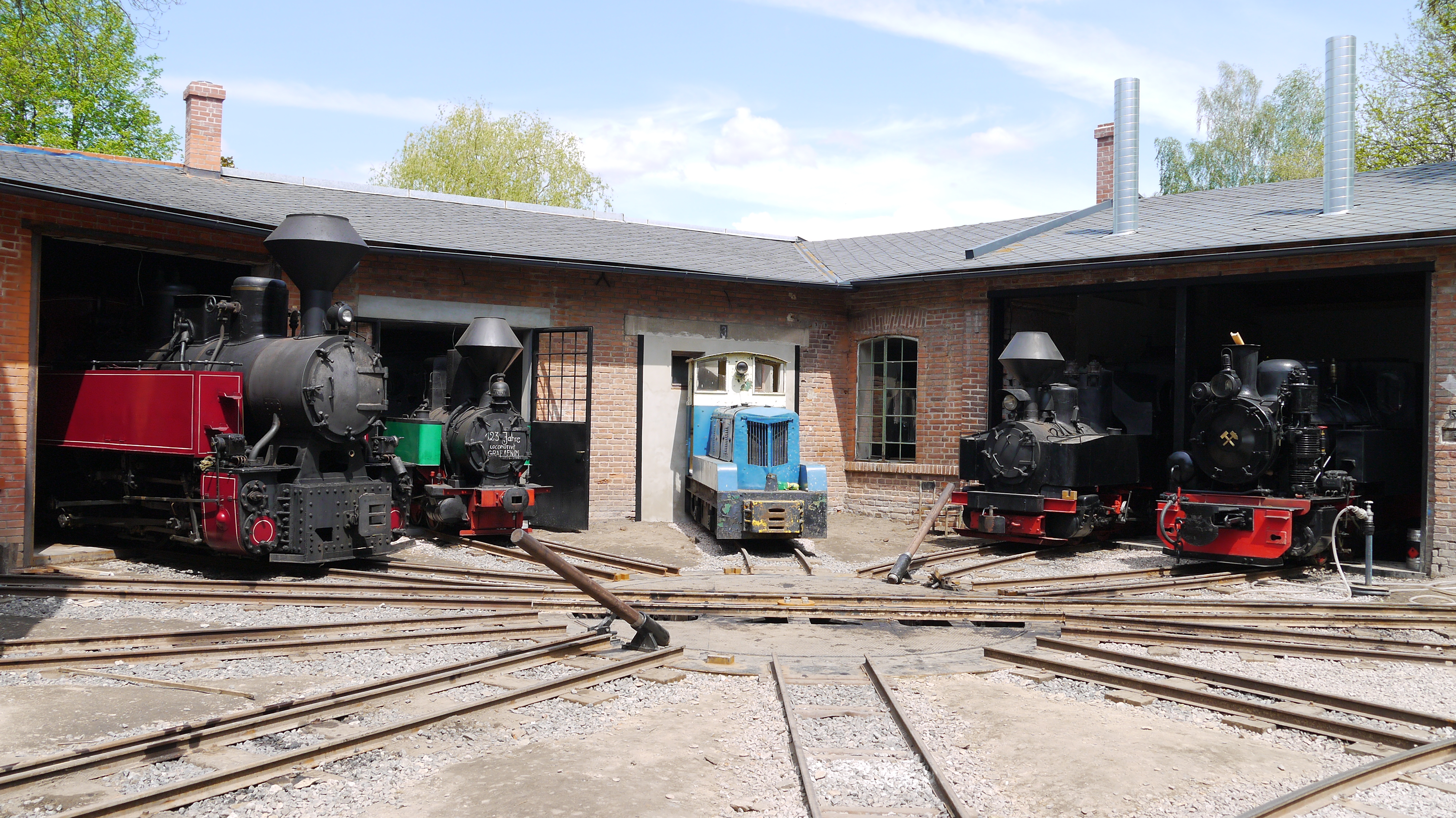
Turntable with locomotives

The Museum of Old Machines and Technologies (Czech: Muzeum starých strojů a technologií) is a technical history museum in Žamberk in the Czech Republic. It is located in the area of the former Vonwiller textile factory. It presents old locomotives, vehicles, steam engines, machine tools and similar exhibits.

== Buildings and area ==
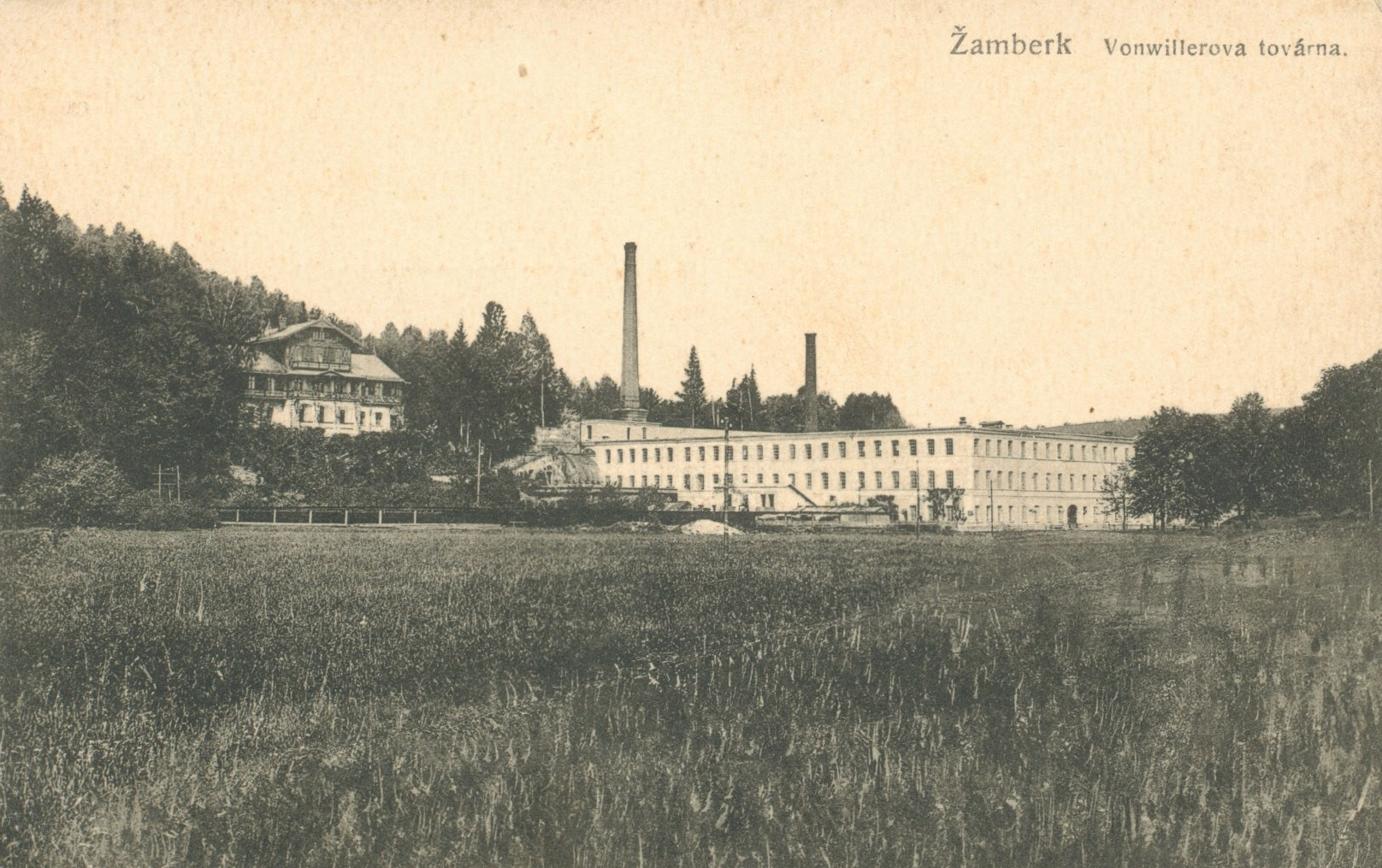
Vonwiller Factory around 1900

The site, then located in the Kingdom of Bohemia within the Austrian Empire, was used from 1838 onwards as one of many production facilities of the Vonwiller entrepreneurial family. After several changes of ownership, textile production was discontinued in 2006. The last operator was Royan, a.s., based in Pardubice. The inscription "ROYAN" on the main building still recalls the last industrial operator.

== Focus and exhibits ==
The museum was opened in 2023 after extensive preparatory work, but had already been open for special events in previous years.

A main focus of the collection is in the area of historical machines. Particularly noteworthy are the originally preserved machines for textile production, as well as stationary and mobile steam engines. The oldest machine in the museum is a steam engine from 1875.

For vehicles, the focus is on steam traction, but road vehicles with internal combustion engines are also collected. In the field of road transport, traction engines or steam lorries are shown.

In the field of rail transport, the collection primarily focuses on narrow-gauge and industrial narrow-gauge steam locomotives with reference to the Austrian-Hungarian, Czechoslovak, and German railway history. Many of these have been restored to operational condition.

== Demonstration track ==
For the demonstration of the numerous existing steam locomotives, there is a track several hundred meters long that runs both between the factory buildings and in the outdoor area. In some sections, the trackage is designed as dual gauge track with 600 mm and 760 mm track gauge. Inside the factory complex, a turntable with several stalls similar to a roundhouse was built.

== Cultural centre and event location ==
The premises of the museum and the historical factory complex are also used as a cultural centre. Furthermore, parts of the complex are rented out as an event location for events such as weddings.

== Gallery ==
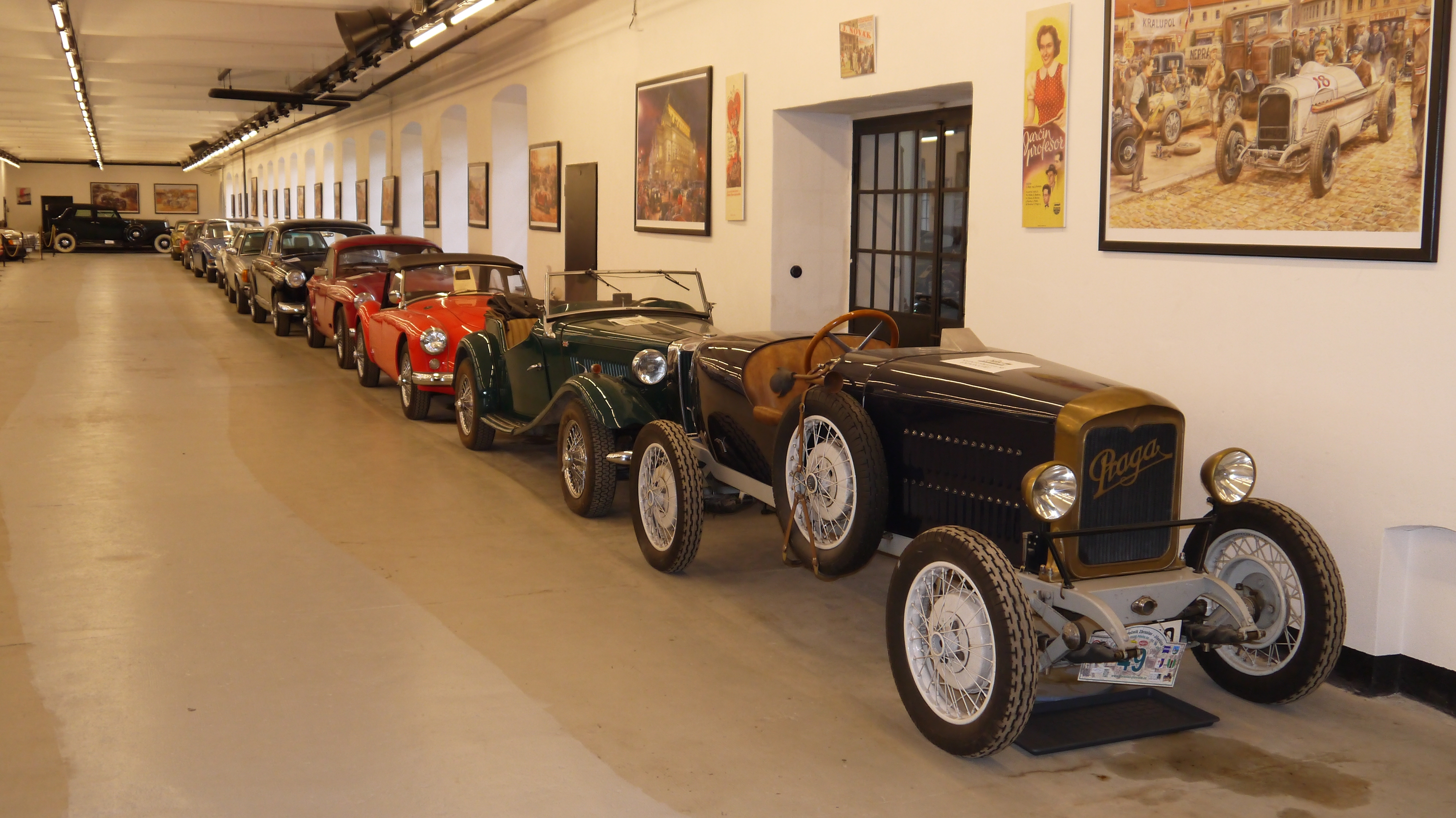
Motor vehicle collection

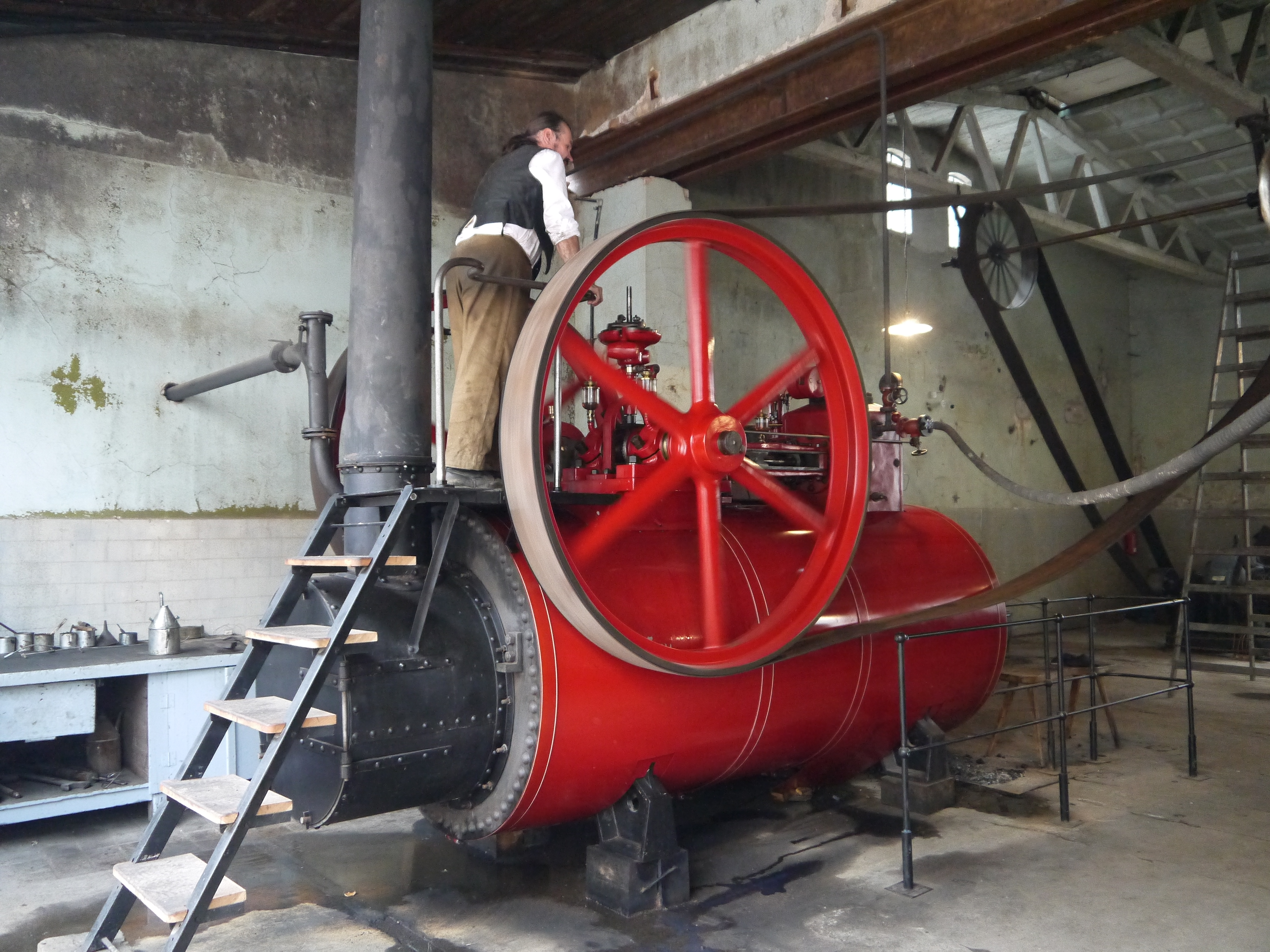
Steam engine

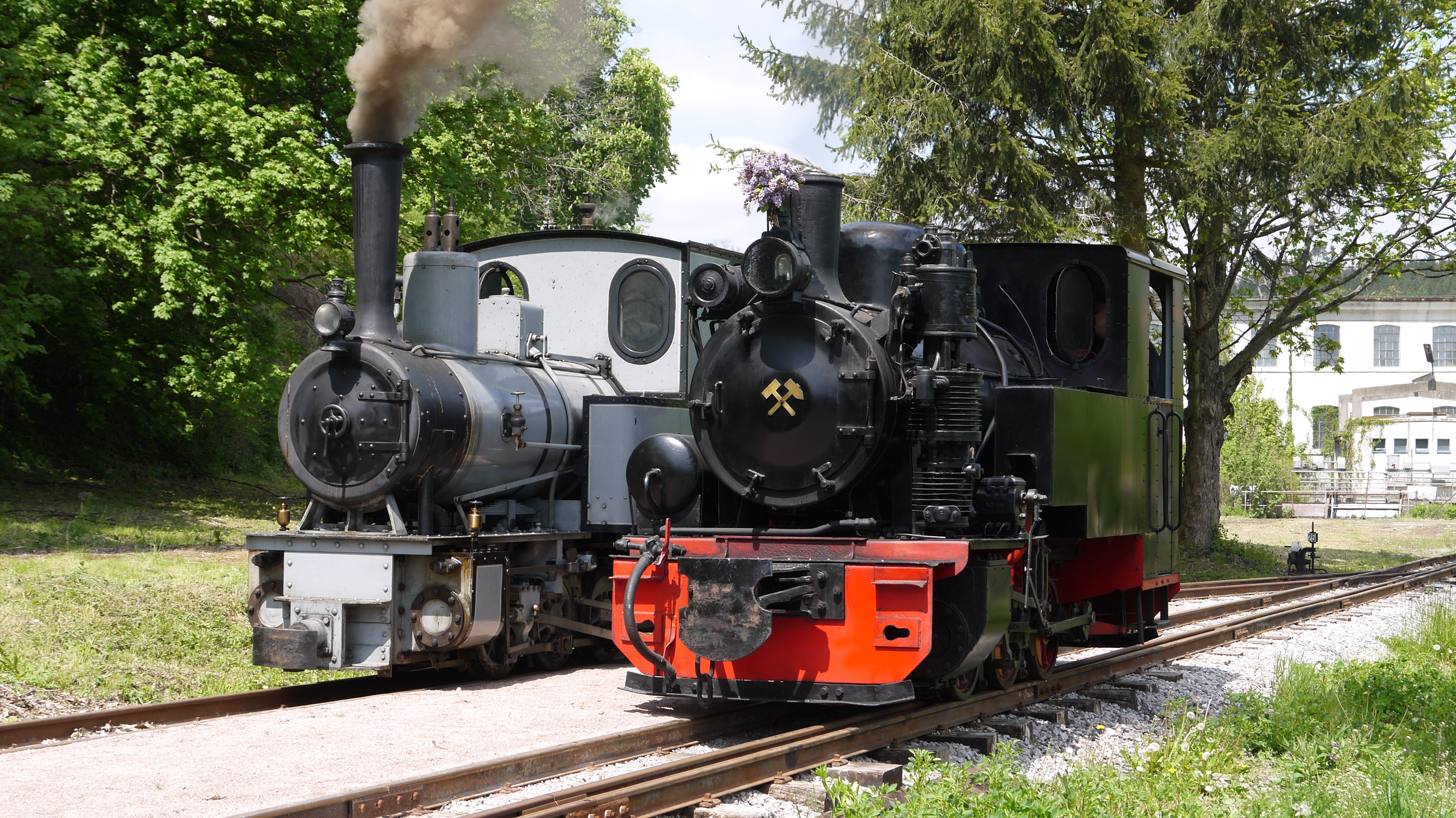
Steam locomotives
