= August Seydler =

Czech astronomer and theoretical physicist

August Jan Bedřich Seydler (German: August Johann Friedrich Seydler; 1 June 1849 – 22 June 1891) was a Czech astronomer and theoretical physicist. He was professor at Charles University in Prague and the founder of the Astronomical Institute of the university (1886).

== Life ==
Seydler was born on 1 June 1849 in Žamberk, into a family of a commissioner of customs. He was a revered pedagogue and contributed significantly to astronomical studies, specifically, he elaborated sophisticated methods for the determination of orbits of minor planets. Appropriately, a minor planet is named after him: 6586 Seydler.

Seydler died on 22 June 1891 in Prague and is buried at the Prague's Olšany Cemetery.
