= Maydl's hernia =

- 1 – peritoneum ;2 – herina sack; 3 – instetinal loops
- Specialty: Gastroenterology

Maydl's hernia (Hernia-in-W) is a rare type of hernia and may be lethal if undiagnosed. The hernial sac contains two loops of bowel with another loop of bowel being intra-abdominal. A loop of bowel in the form of 'W lies in the hernial sac and the centre portion of the 'W loop may become strangulated, either alone or in combination with the bowel in the hernial sac. It is more often seen in men, and predominantly on the right side. Maydl's hernia should be suspected in patients with large incarcerated herniae and in patients with evidence of intra-abdominal strangulation or peritonitis. Postural or manual reduction of the hernia is contra-indicated as it may result in non-viable bowel being missed.

It is named after Czech surgeon Karel Maydl.
