= Adolf Lorenz =

Austrian orthopedic surgeon

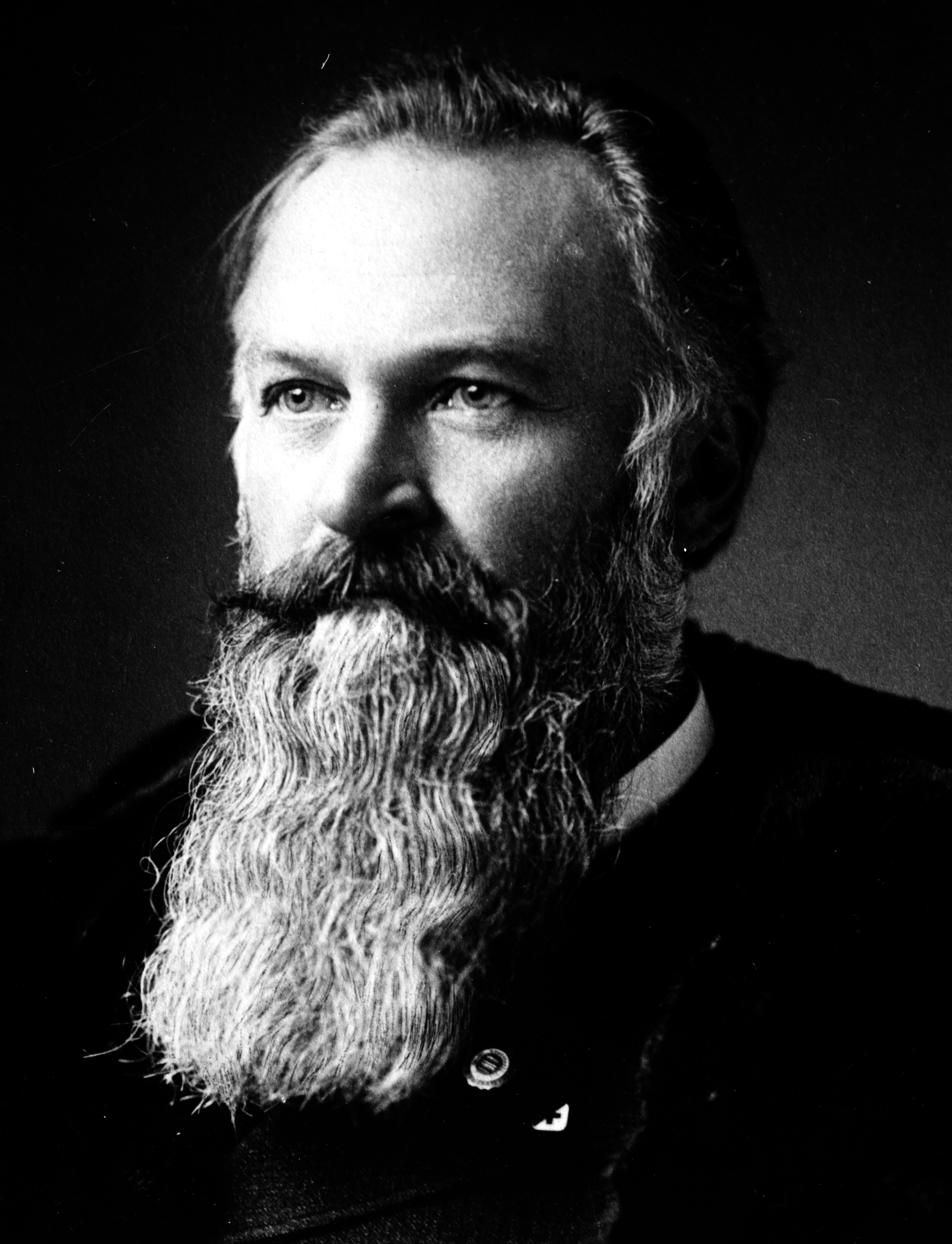
Adolf Lorenz

Adolf Lorenz (21 April 1854, Vidnava – 12 February 1946, Sankt Andrä-Wördern) was an Austrian orthopedic surgeon.

== Career ==
He studied medicine at the University of Vienna and subsequently worked as an assistant to surgeon Eduard Albert (1841–1900) in Vienna. In 1901 he was one of the founders of the German Society of Orthopaedic Surgery. He was the father of famed ethologist Konrad Lorenz (1903–1989).

Adolf Lorenz is remembered for his work with bone deformities. As a young surgeon during the 1880s, he developed a severe allergic skin reaction to carbolic acid, a compound that was used extensively in operating rooms. Although the condition prevented him from performing traditional surgical operations, he continued in the medical profession as a "dry surgeon", treating patients without cutting into skin or tissue. Subsequently, he was given the nickname "The Bloodless Surgeon of Vienna". His techniques became known as bloodless surgery, reflecting his noninvasive techniques. He was also a eugenicist who said that babies born prematurely should be left to die rather than develop spastic paralysis.

He was renowned for his treatment of congenital dislocation of the hip in children. His technique involved putting the patient under light anesthesia, placing the child in a plaster spica cast in abduction, then using external rotation as the child matured. Also, he added a specialized walking frame to give the patient a measure of mobility.

He created a manipulative treatment for club feet, a process that involved stretching or breaking the tendons, ligaments, and epiphyseal plates until the foot was properly aligned. Once alignment was achieved, he applied a cast so that the foot healed in the corrected position.

Through the use of traction and pulleys, Lorenz developed a mechanism for treatment of scoliosis.

Due to his fame in orthopedics, he became acquainted with several dignitaries, including U.S. President Theodore Roosevelt. During his travels in the United States, he gave an inspirational exhibition in Dallas, an exhibition that became a catalyst in the creation of the Texas Baptist Memorial Sanitarium, later known as the Baylor University Medical Center and Baylor Health Care System.

== Personal life ==
Lorenz married his assistant, physician Emma Lecher. The family owned a large estate at Altenburg, including a "fantastical neo-baroque mansion" which Konrad Lorenz inherited, and had a city apartment in Vienna.
