= Rokytnice nad Jizerou =

- Town
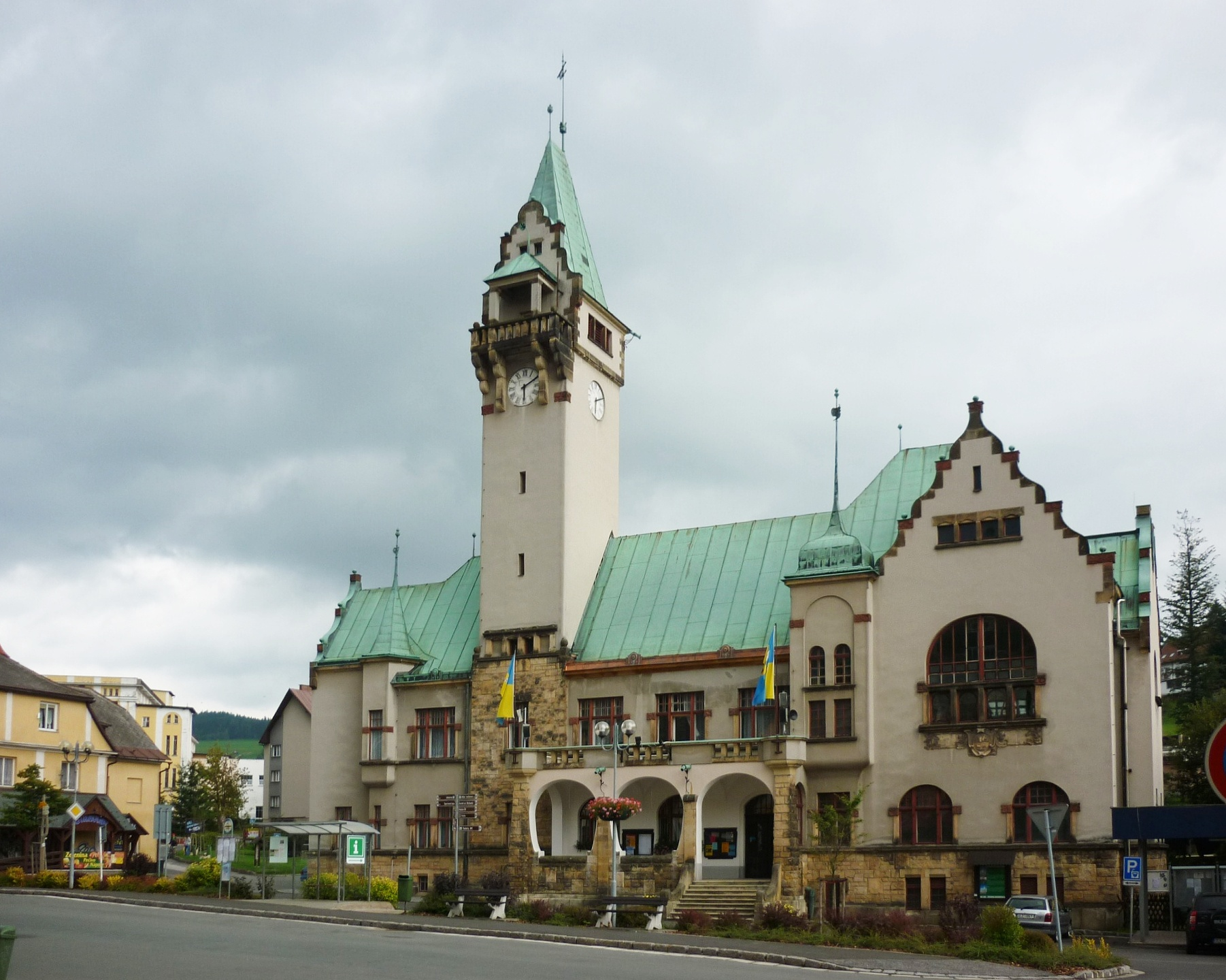
- Town hall

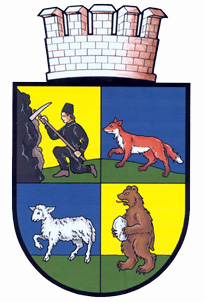
- Flag Coat of arms

- Location in the Czech Republic
- Coordinates: 50°43′48″N 15°27′0″E
- Country: Czech Republic
- Region: Liberec
- District: Semily
- Founded: 1574

Government
  - Mayor: Petr Matyáš

Area
  - Total: 36.94 km^{2} (14.26 sq mi)
- Elevation: 520 m (1,710 ft)

Population (2026-01-01)
  - Total: 2,459
  - Density: 66.57/km^{2} (172.4/sq mi)
- Time zone: UTC+1 (CET)
  - Summer (DST): UTC+2 (CEST)
- Postal codes: 512 44, 512 45
- Website: www.rokytnice.com

Rokytnice nad Jizerou (Czech pronunciation: [ˈrokɪtɲɪtsɛ ˈnad jɪzɛrou]; German: Rochlitz an der Iser) is a town in Semily District in the Liberec Region of the Czech Republic. It has about 2,500 inhabitants. The town is located on the stream Huťský potok in the Giant Mountains.

Rokytnice nad Jizerou was founded in 1574. The town is known mainly as a centre of winter sports.

== Administrative division ==
Rokytnice nad Jizerou consists of seven municipal parts (in brackets population according to the 2021 census):

- Dolní Rokytnice (874)
- Horní Rokytnice (1,454)
- Františkov (58)
- Hleďsebe (0)
- Hranice (11)
- Rokytno (73)
- Studenov (12)

== Etymology ==
Rokytnice nad Jizerou was named after the stream Huťský potok, formerly called Rokytnice. The name Rokytnice refers to the Old Czech word rokyta (meaning 'willow', a common tree in the area).

== Geography ==
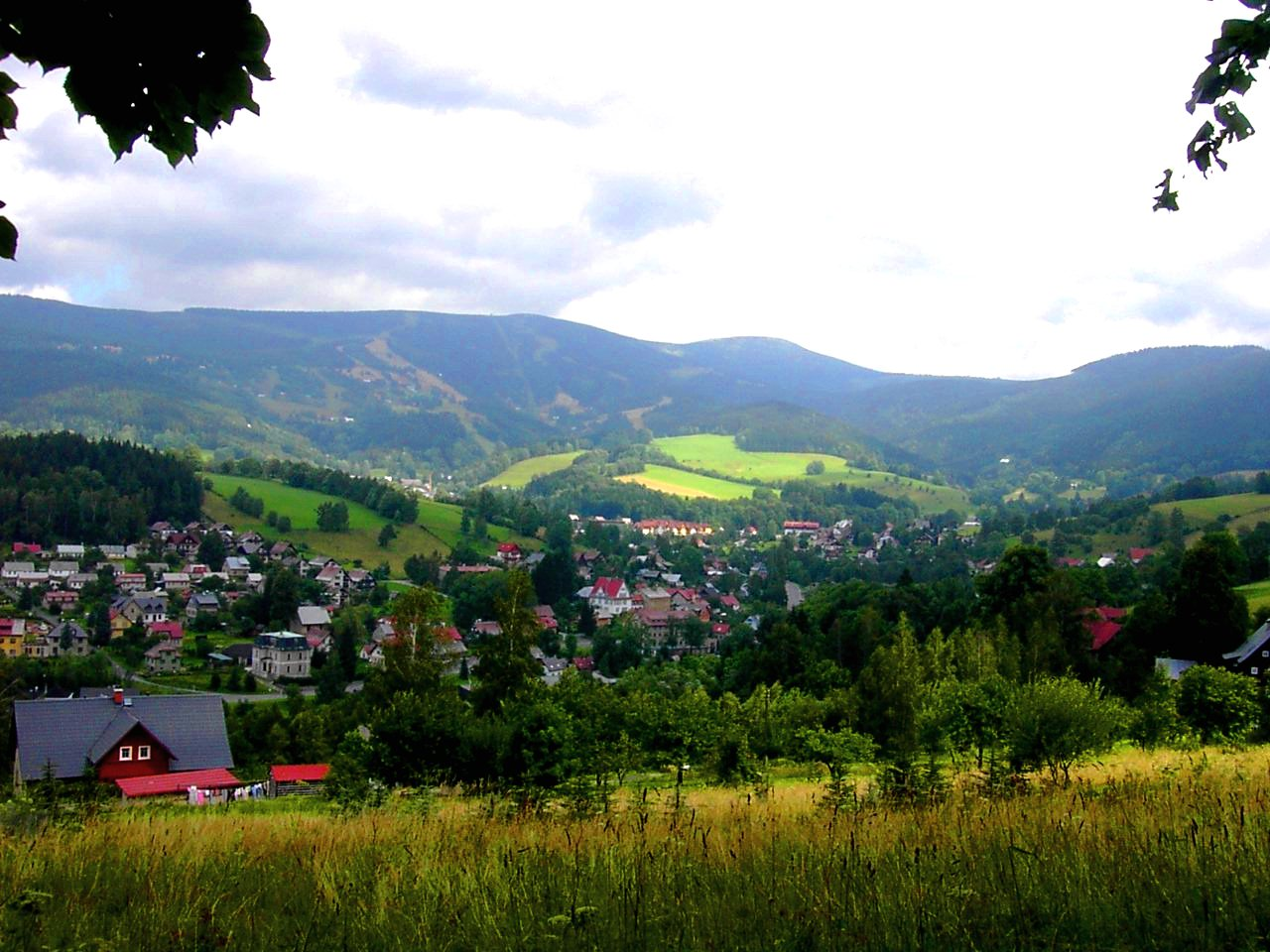
The town with the mountain Lysá hora

Rokytnice nad Jizerou is located about 27 kilometres (17 mi) east of Liberec. It is a mountain resort town in the western part of the Giant Mountains. The municipal territory borders Poland. The town is located in elongated valleys of the stream Huťský potok, covering an area between the mountains massifs Stráž at 782 m (2,566 ft) above sea level and Lysá hora at 1,344 m (4,409 ft), and the left bank of the Jizera River. The highest peak in the municipal territory is Sokolník at 1,384 m (4,541 ft), which is located on the border with Poland. The Mumlava River crosses the northern part of the municipal territory.

== History ==
Rokytnice nad Jizerou was founded in 1574. The first inhabitants engaged in logging and metal mining (copper, lead and silver). The mining stopped paying off at the beginning of the 20th century and ceased. Other important economic activity was glassmaking.

== Demographics ==
Historical population

Year	Pop.	±%
1869	8,097	—
1880	7,611	−6.0%
1890	7,391	−2.9%
1900	6,949	−6.0%
1910	6,480	−6.7%

Year	Pop.	±%
1921	5,227	−19.3%
1930	5,046	−3.5%
1950	3,385	−32.9%
1961	3,200	−5.5%
1970	3,307	+3.3%

Year	Pop.	±%
1980	3,505	+6.0%
1991	3,469	−1.0%
2001	3,388	−2.3%
2011	2,877	−15.1%
2021	2,482	−13.7%

Source: Censuses

== Transport ==
The I/14 road from Liberec to Trutnov runs through the town.

Rokytnice nad Jizerou is the starting point of the railway line to Martinice v Krkonoších.

== Sport ==
In winter, Rokytnice's two ski resorts in Studenov and at the mountain Lysá hora are among the most famous ski resorts in the Czech Republic. There are ten lifts and 17 km (11 mi) of ski slopes, including one of the longest slopes in the country with a length of 2,920 m (9,580 ft).

== Sights ==
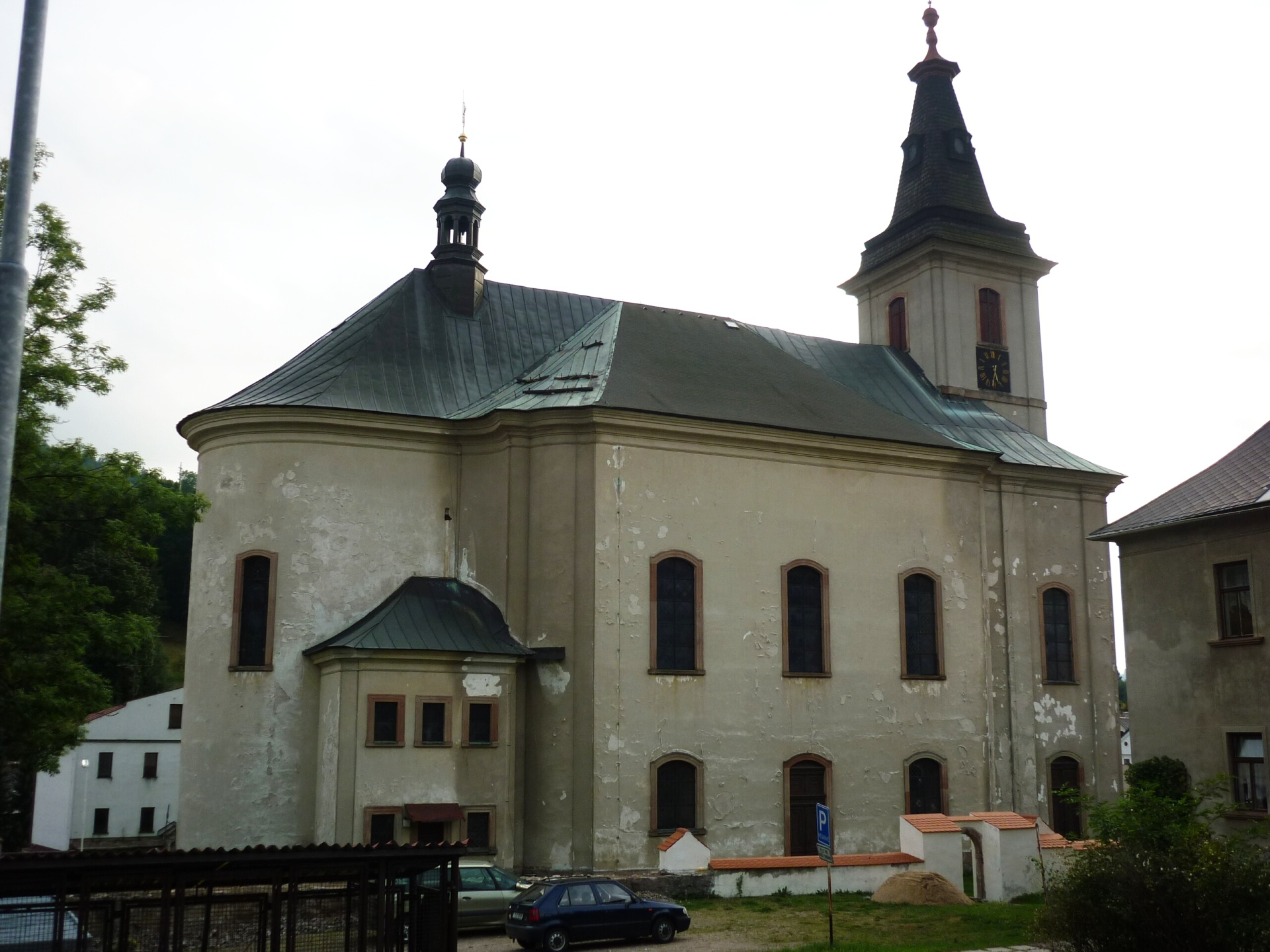
Church of Saint Michael the Archangel

The main landmark of the town is the Church of Saint Michael the Archangel, located in Dolní Rokytnice. It was built in the Baroque style in 1752–1759.

A notable building is the town hall, built in 1902–1903. It represents early modern architecture and has Art Nouveau elements in the interior.

== Notable people ==
- Karel Maydl (1853–1903), Czech-Austrian surgeon
- Franz Fühmann (1922–1984), German writer
- Milan Jarý (born 1952), cross-country skier
- Leona Neumannová (born 1987), volleyball player
