= Leona Neumannová =

Czech volleyball player

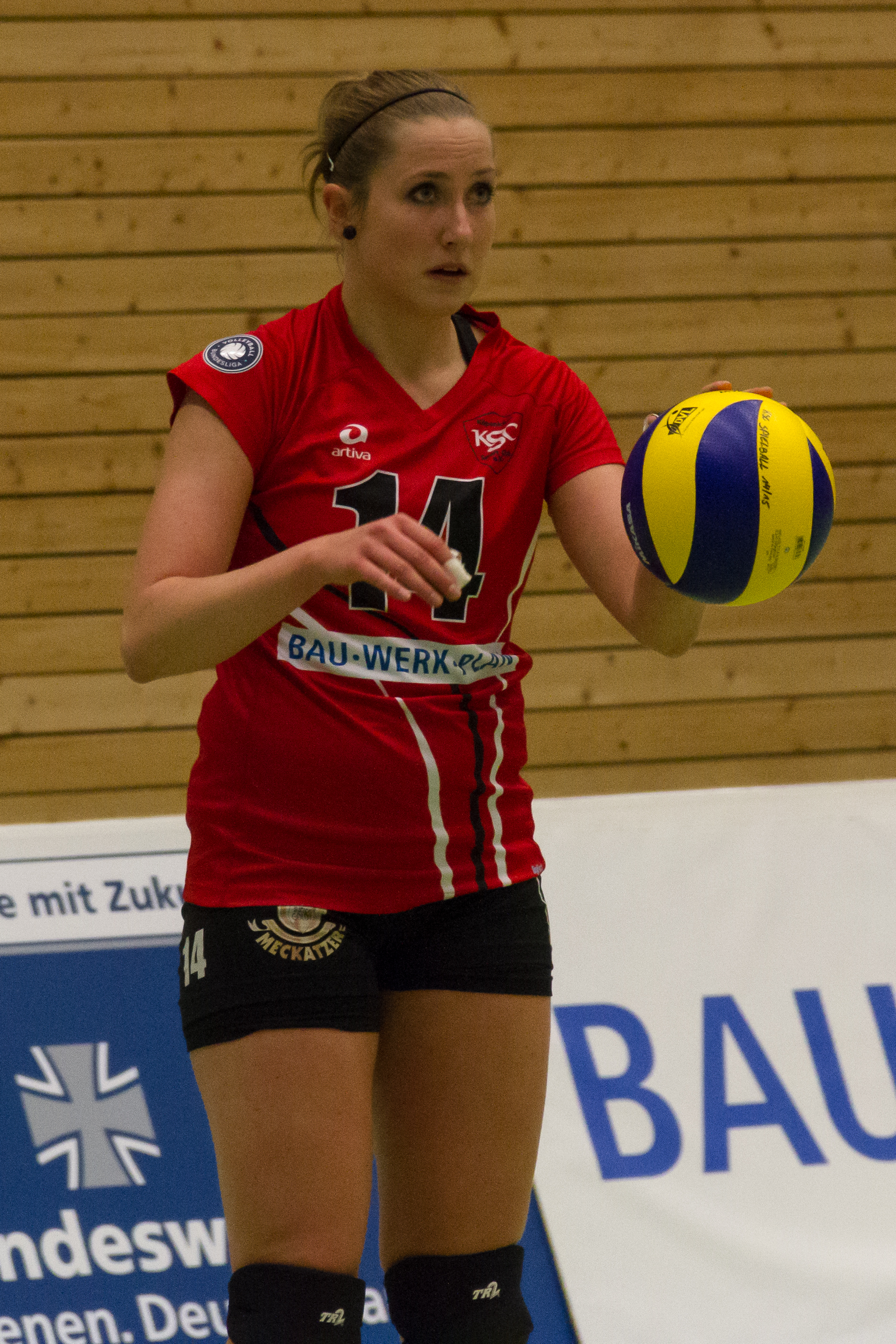
- Berlin 2014

Personal information
- Born: 14 August 1987 (age 39); Rokytnice nad Jizerou, Czechoslovakia
- Height: 1.79 m (5 ft 10 in)

Career
Years	Teams
2002–2003; 2003–2010; 2010–2012; 2012–2013; 2013–2014; 2014; 2015; 2015–	SK Ješzědská Liberec; VK Dukla Liberec; Slavia Prague; Dauphines Charleroi; Allgäu Team Sonthofen; Köpenicker SC; NawaRo Straubing; Volley Top Luzern

National team
2010–	Czech Republic
- Last updated: 18 August 2015

Leona Neumannová (born 14 August 1987 in Rokytnice nad Jizerou, Czechoslovakia) is a female Czech volleyball player.

== Career ==
After finishing her training at the Czech clubs of SK Ješzědská Liberec and VK Dukla Liberec, Neumannová played for Slavia Prague from 2010 until 2012. After that, she transferred to the Belgian club Dauphines Charleroi, with whom she reached 13th place in the 2012–13 Women's CEV Cup. In the 2014/15 season, Neumannová left TSV Sonthofen in the Second German League to join Köpenicker SC in the First German League. At the half-way stage in the season, she transferred to NawaRo Straubling in the Second German League, with whom she would win the Second German League South. After that, she moved to Swiss club Volley Top Luzern.
