= Dlouhoňovice =

- Municipality
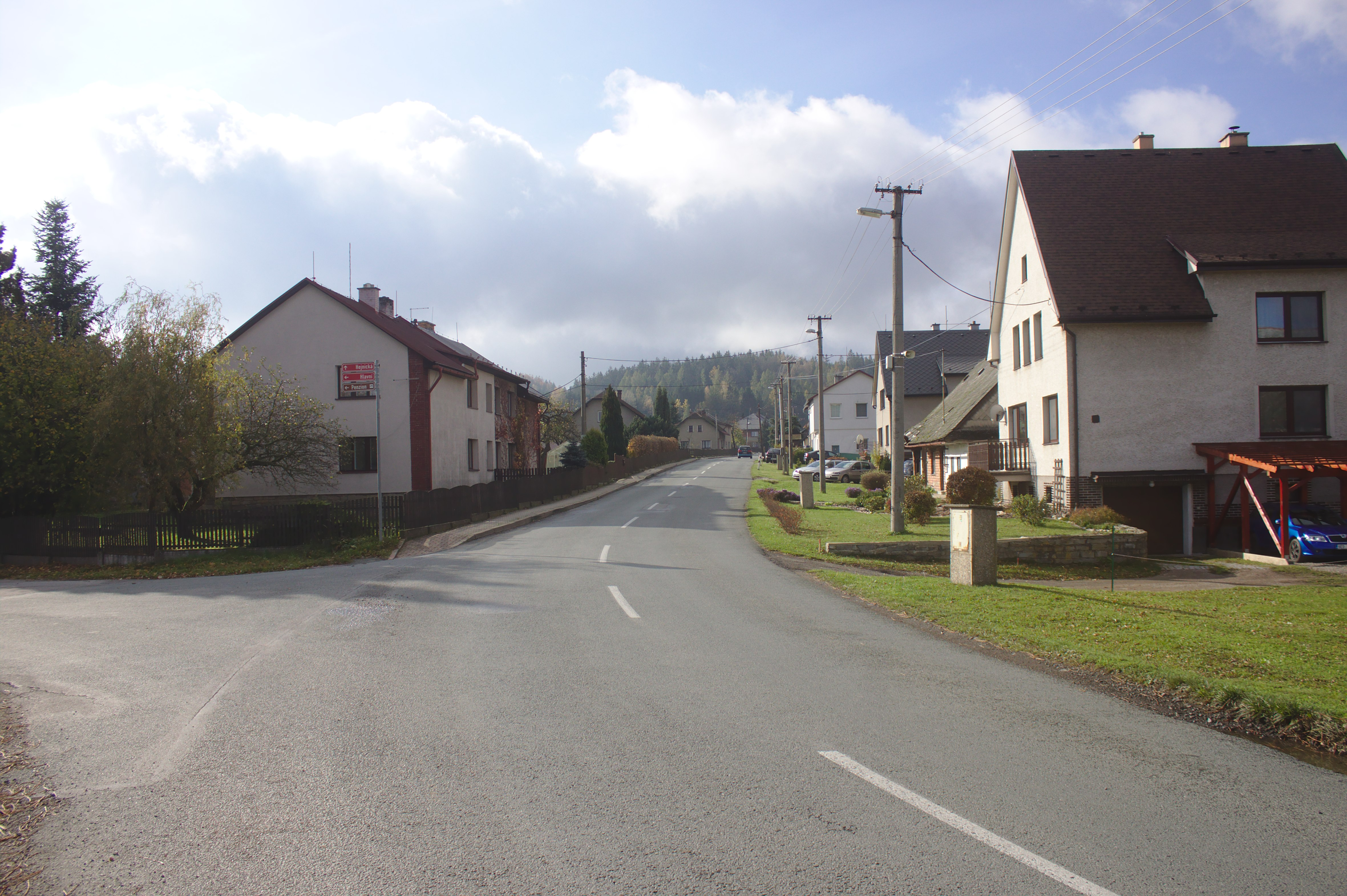
- Main road

- Flag Coat of arms

- Location in the Czech Republic
- Coordinates: 50°4′13″N 16°26′30″E
- Country: Czech Republic
- Region: Pardubice
- District: Ústí nad Orlicí
- First mentioned: 1543

Area
  - Total: 3.90 km^{2} (1.51 sq mi)
- Elevation: 416 m (1,365 ft)

Population (2026-01-01)
  - Total: 845
  - Density: 217/km^{2} (561/sq mi)
- Time zone: UTC+1 (CET)
  - Summer (DST): UTC+2 (CEST)
- Postal code: 564 01
- Website: www.dlouhonovice.cz

Dlouhoňovice is a municipality and village in Ústí nad Orlicí District in the Pardubice Region of the Czech Republic. It has about 800 inhabitants.

== Etymology ==
According to one theory, the name is derived from the personal name Dlúhoň, meaning "the village of Dlúhoň's people". According to another theory, the name is derived from dlouhé hony, which denoted long narrow fields.

== Geography ==
Dlouhoňovice is located about 11 kilometres (7 mi) north of Ústí nad Orlicí and 46 km (29 mi) east of Pardubice. It lies in the Orlické Foothills. The highest point is at 510 m (1,673 ft) above sea level.

== History ==
The first written mention of Dlouhoňovice is from 1543. The village was probably founded in the 14th century.

== Demographics ==
Historical population

Year	Pop.	±%
1869	324	—
1880	404	+24.7%
1890	438	+8.4%
1900	414	−5.5%
1910	411	−0.7%

Year	Pop.	±%
1921	400	−2.7%
1930	398	−0.5%
1950	410	+3.0%
1961	387	−5.6%
1970	455	+17.6%

Year	Pop.	±%
1980	437	−4.0%
1991	787	+80.1%
2001	769	−2.3%
2011	739	−3.9%
2021	814	+10.1%

Source: Censuses

== Transport ==
The railway station named Žamberk, which serves the town of Žamberk, is located in the territory of Dlouhoňovice. It lies on the railway line Hradec Králové–Letohrad.

== Sights ==
There are no protected cultural monuments in the municipality.
