= Burgruine Senftenberg =

Castle ruin in Austria

Coordinates: 48°26′56″N 15°33′57″E

- Lower Austria, Austria
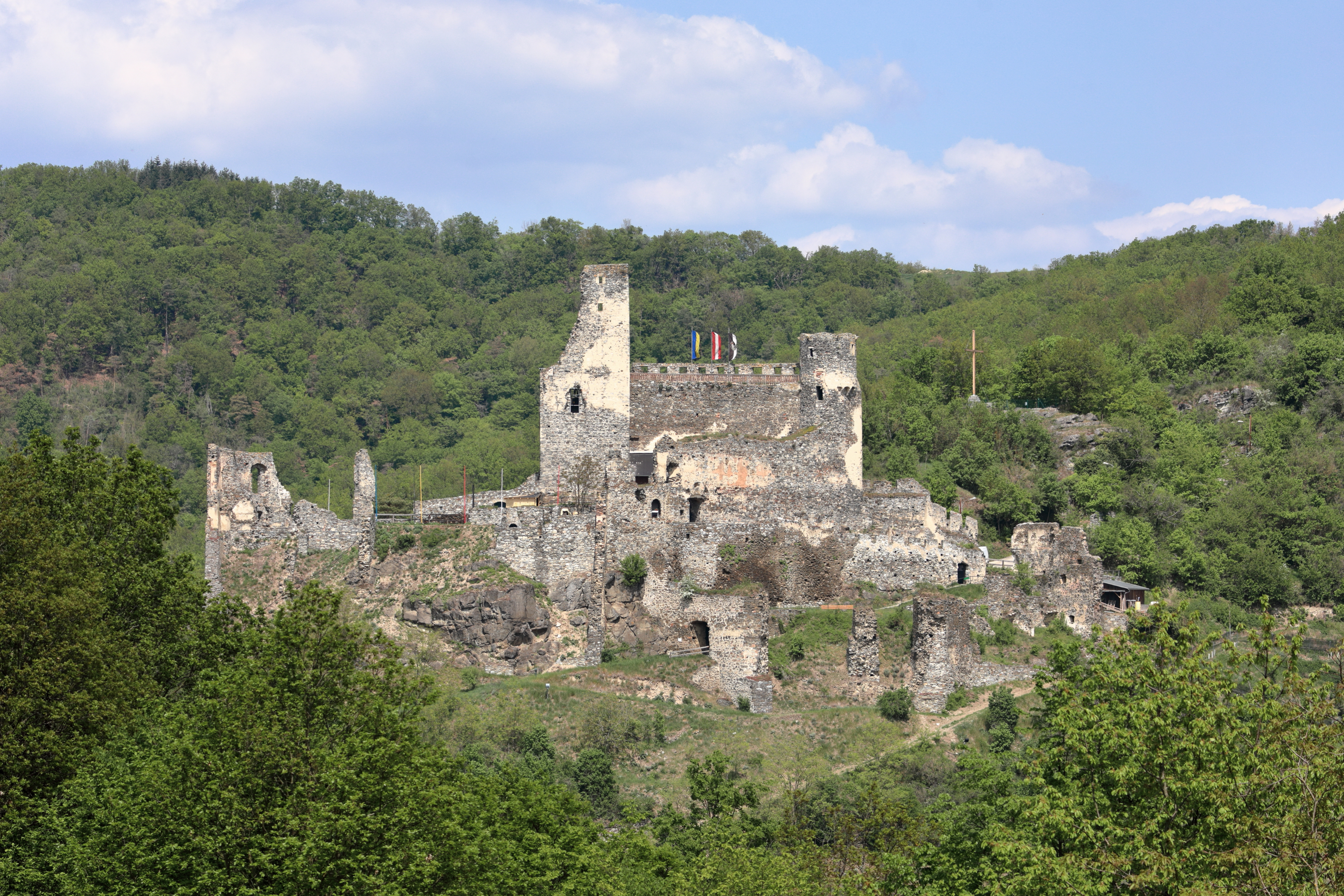

Site information
- Type: Castle
- Open to the public: Open all year around; access at own risk.

Burgruine Senftenberg is a castle in Lower Austria at the town Senftenberg, Austria. Burgruine Senftenberg is 271 metres (889 ft) above sea level.

== See also ==
- List of castles in Austria
