= Karel Maydl =

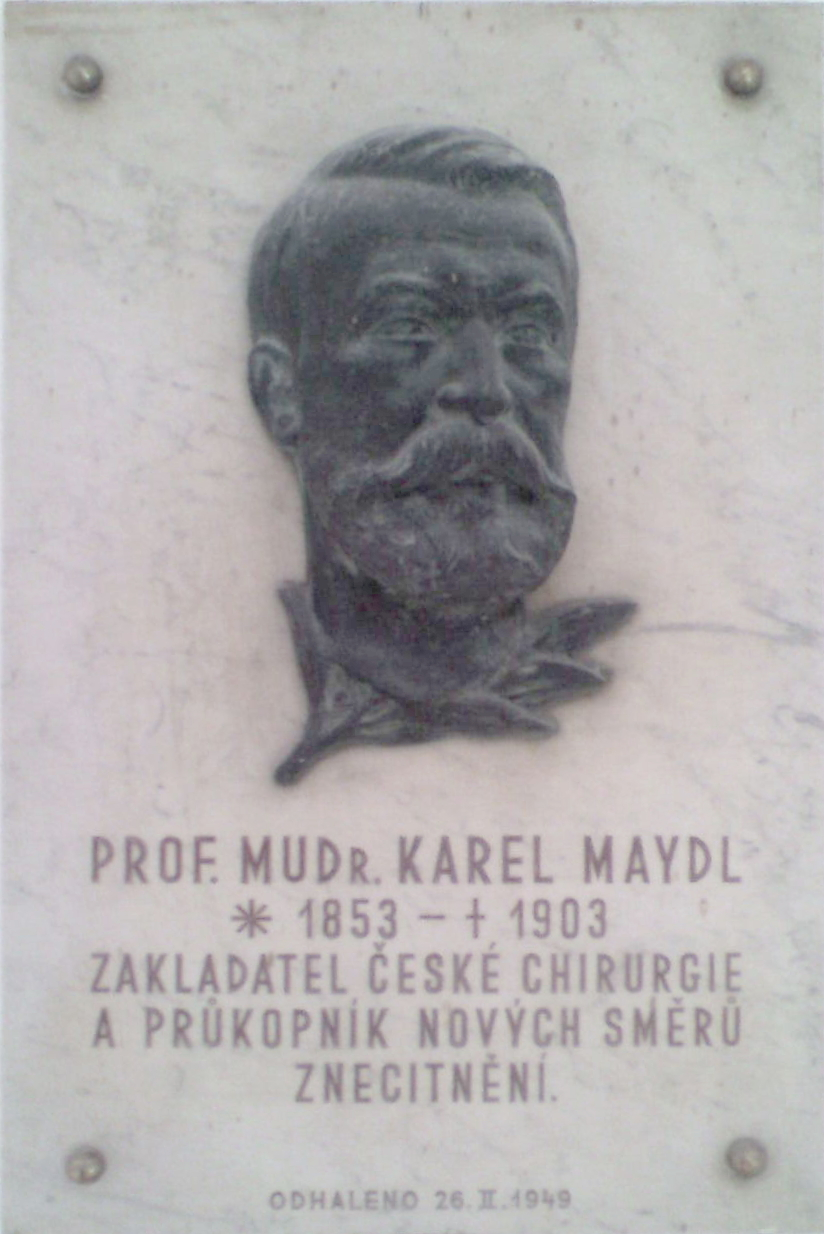
Memorial plaque of Karel Maydl by Julius Pelikán in Olomouc

Karel Maydl (10 March 1853 – 8 August 1903) was a Czech-Austrian surgeon. He is considered the founder of Czech surgery.

== Life and career ==
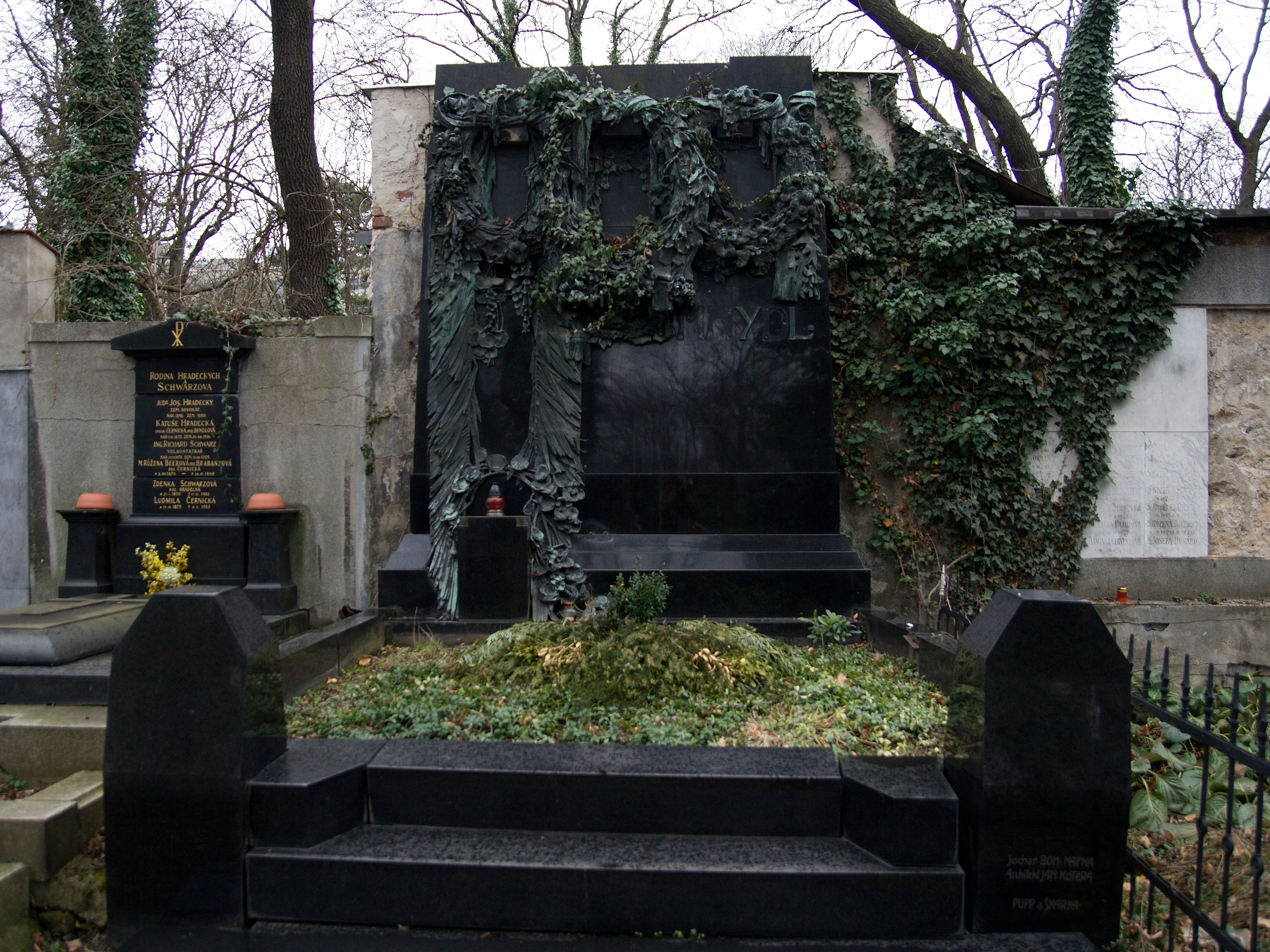
Grave of Maydl at Olšany Cemetery

Maydl was born on 10 March 1853 in Rokytnice nad Jizerou, Bohemia, Austrian Empire.

In 1876, he received his medical doctorate at Prague, and following graduation was a surgical assistant to Carl Wilhelm Heine (1838–1877). Afterwards he worked with Eduard Albert (1841–1900) at the Universities of Innsbruck and Vienna. In 1886, he became an associate professor in Vienna, and in 1891 was appointed professor of surgery at the Czech University in Prague.

Karel Maydl is remembered for the introduction of new surgical techniques, including a procedure for treatment of bladder exstrophy, as well as loop colostomy for use in cases of inoperable rectal cancer.

His name is associated with "Maydl's hernia", defined as a strangulated bowel within the abdominal cavity having the loops of the intestines forming a W.

In 1897 he was the first physician to describe the disease later known as Legg–Calvé–Perthes syndrome.

Maydl died on 8 August 1903 and is buried at the Olšany Cemetery in Prague.
