= Žamberk =

- Town
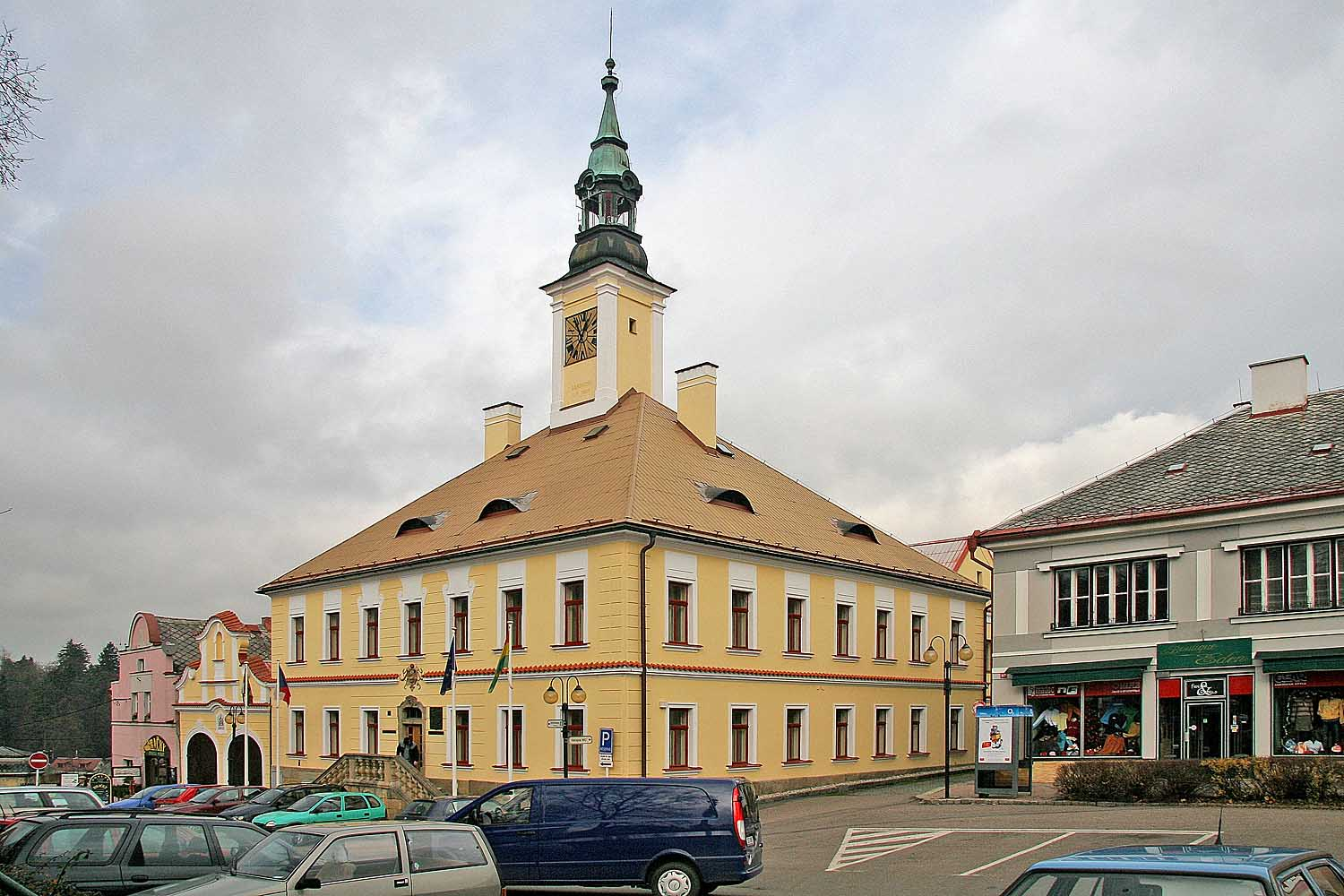
- Town hall

- Flag Coat of arms

- Location in the Czech Republic
- Coordinates: 50°5′10″N 16°28′3″E
- Country: Czech Republic
- Region: Pardubice
- District: Ústí nad Orlicí
- First mentioned: 1332

Government
  - Mayor: Jiří Mencák

Area
  - Total: 16.91 km^{2} (6.53 sq mi)
- Elevation: 418 m (1,371 ft)

Population (2026-01-01)
  - Total: 5,770
  - Density: 341/km^{2} (884/sq mi)
- Time zone: UTC+1 (CET)
  - Summer (DST): UTC+2 (CEST)
- Postal code: 564 01
- Website: www.zamberk.cz

Žamberk (Czech pronunciation: [ˈʒambɛrk]; German: Senftenberg) is a town in Ústí nad Orlicí District in the Pardubice Region of the Czech Republic. It has about 5,800 inhabitants. The town is located on the Divoká Orlice River in the Orlické Foothills. It is known as the birthplace of the inventor Prokop Diviš.

Žamberk was founded in the second half of the 13th century. The historic town centre is well preserved and is protected as an urban monument zone. The main landmark of the town is the Žamberk Castle.

== Etymology ==
The initial German name of the settlement was Senftenberg. It was created from the German word berg ('hill') and the Middle High German word senfte ('gentle', 'soft'). The Czech name was created by transcription of the German name.

== Geography ==
Žamberk is located about 13 kilometres (8 mi) northeast of Ústí nad Orlicí and 49 km (30 mi) east of Pardubice. It lies in the Orlické Foothills. The highest point is the hill Hůrka at 516 m (1,693 ft) above sea level. The Divoká Orlice River flows through the town.

=== Climate ===
Žamberk's climate is classified as humid continental climate (Köppen: Dfb; Trewartha: Dcbo). Among them, the annual average temperature is 8.3 °C (46.9 °F), the hottest month in July is 18.3 °C (64.9 °F), and the coldest month is −2.0 °C (28.4 °F) in January. The annual precipitation is 747.7 millimetres (29.44 in), of which July is the wettest with 98.4 millimetres (3.87 in), while April is the driest with only 37.2 millimetres (1.46 in). The extreme temperature throughout the year ranged from −30.3 °C (−22.5 °F) on 28 January 1942 to 34.8 °C (94.6 °F) on 7 August 2015.

Climate data for Žamberk, 1991–2020 normals, extremes 1850–present
Month	Jan	Feb	Mar	Apr	May	Jun	Jul	Aug	Sep	Oct	Nov	Dec	Year
Record high °C (°F)	13.9 (57.0)	16.4 (61.5)	22.1 (71.8)	27.3 (81.1)	31.3 (88.3)	34.4 (93.9)	34.6 (94.3)	34.8 (94.6)	30.9 (87.6)	25.1 (77.2)	19.8 (67.6)	13.2 (55.8)	34.8 (94.6)
Mean daily maximum °C (°F)	0.8 (33.4)	2.9 (37.2)	8.0 (46.4)	15.0 (59.0)	18.4 (65.1)	22.4 (72.3)	24.6 (76.3)	24.2 (75.6)	19.0 (66.2)	12.9 (55.2)	7.3 (45.1)	2.3 (36.1)	13.2 (55.8)
Daily mean °C (°F)	−2.0 (28.4)	−0.6 (30.9)	2.7 (36.9)	8.6 (47.5)	12.7 (54.9)	16.8 (62.2)	18.3 (64.9)	17.5 (63.5)	12.8 (55.0)	8.0 (46.4)	4.3 (39.7)	0.0 (32.0)	8.3 (46.9)
Mean daily minimum °C (°F)	−5.1 (22.8)	−4.0 (24.8)	−1.8 (28.8)	1.9 (35.4)	6.4 (43.5)	10.5 (50.9)	11.8 (53.2)	11.4 (52.5)	7.6 (45.7)	3.9 (39.0)	1.4 (34.5)	−2.4 (27.7)	3.5 (38.3)
Record low °C (°F)	−30.3 (−22.5)	−27.0 (−16.6)	−18.4 (−1.1)	−9.5 (14.9)	−4.6 (23.7)	−0.3 (31.5)	3.0 (37.4)	2.0 (35.6)	−2.8 (27.0)	−6.8 (19.8)	−14.7 (5.5)	−26.2 (−15.2)	−30.3 (−22.5)
Average precipitation mm (inches)	57.6 (2.27)	48.8 (1.92)	52.7 (2.07)	37.2 (1.46)	69.2 (2.72)	80.9 (3.19)	98.4 (3.87)	73.4 (2.89)	62.9 (2.48)	53.7 (2.11)	53.9 (2.12)	59.0 (2.32)	747.7 (29.44)
Average snowfall cm (inches)	29.5 (11.6)	29.8 (11.7)	14.2 (5.6)	3.4 (1.3)	0.0 (0.0)	0.0 (0.0)	0.0 (0.0)	0.0 (0.0)	0.0 (0.0)	0.6 (0.2)	12.1 (4.8)	28.5 (11.2)	118.1 (46.5)
Average relative humidity (%)	89.6	85.2	79.8	72.1	74.3	75.6	75.1	77.8	83.4	87.8	90.2	91.8	81.9
Mean monthly sunshine hours	33.2	57.8	116.2	204.8	204.9	223.2	245.8	232.2	157.5	79.7	37.7	25.6	1,618.6
Source: Czech Hydrometeorological Institute

== History ==
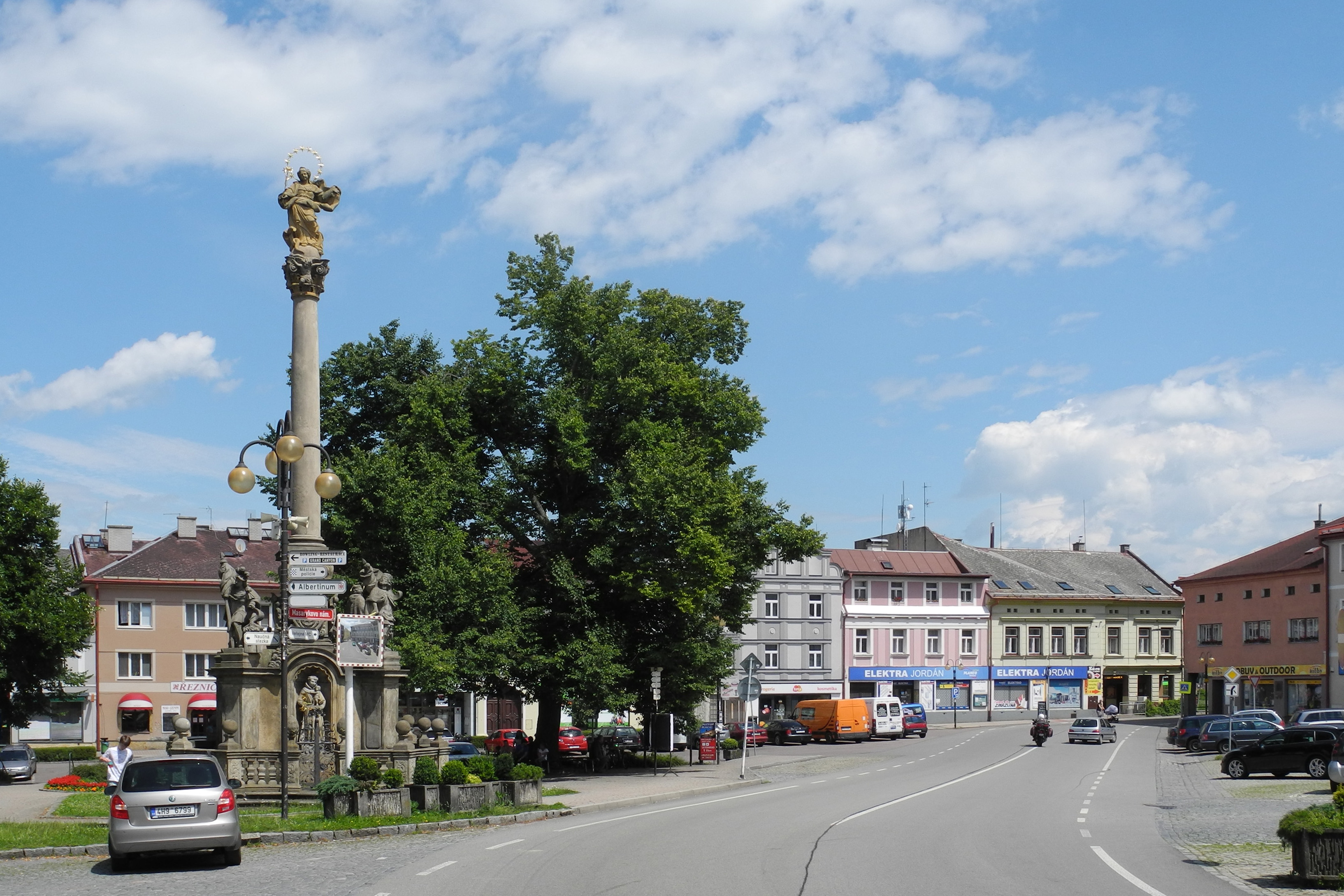
The square Masarykovo náměstí with the Marian column

Žamberk was founded in the second half of the 13th century, during the colonisation of this region. Its predecessor was a Slavic settlement on a trade route from Moravia to Kłodzko Land. The first written mention of Žamberk is from 1332, under its German name Senftenberg. Soon after, the Czech name began to be used, which testifies to the majority of the Czech population.

In the middle of the 14th century, Žamberk was divided between the estates of Litice and Žampach with different owners. As a part of the Litice estate, it was owned by the Pernštejn family and Ernest of Bavaria. In 1563, it was acquired by Mikuláš Bubna of Litice. In 1575, he bought the second part of Žamberk and merged the two parts. In 1575–1600, he had built a castle here and since then it was known as the Žamberk estate. The Bubna of Litice family owned the estate until 1809.

== Demographics ==
Historical population

Year	Pop.	±%
1869	3,353	—
1880	3,664	+9.3%
1890	3,678	+0.4%
1900	3,425	−6.9%
1910	3,641	+6.3%

Year	Pop.	±%
1921	3,702	+1.7%
1930	4,323	+16.8%
1950	4,170	−3.5%
1961	4,417	+5.9%
1970	4,605	+4.3%

Year	Pop.	±%
1980	5,366	+16.5%
1991	5,864	+9.3%
2001	6,153	+4.9%
2011	6,092	−1.0%
2021	5,788	−5.0%

Source: Censuses

== Economy ==
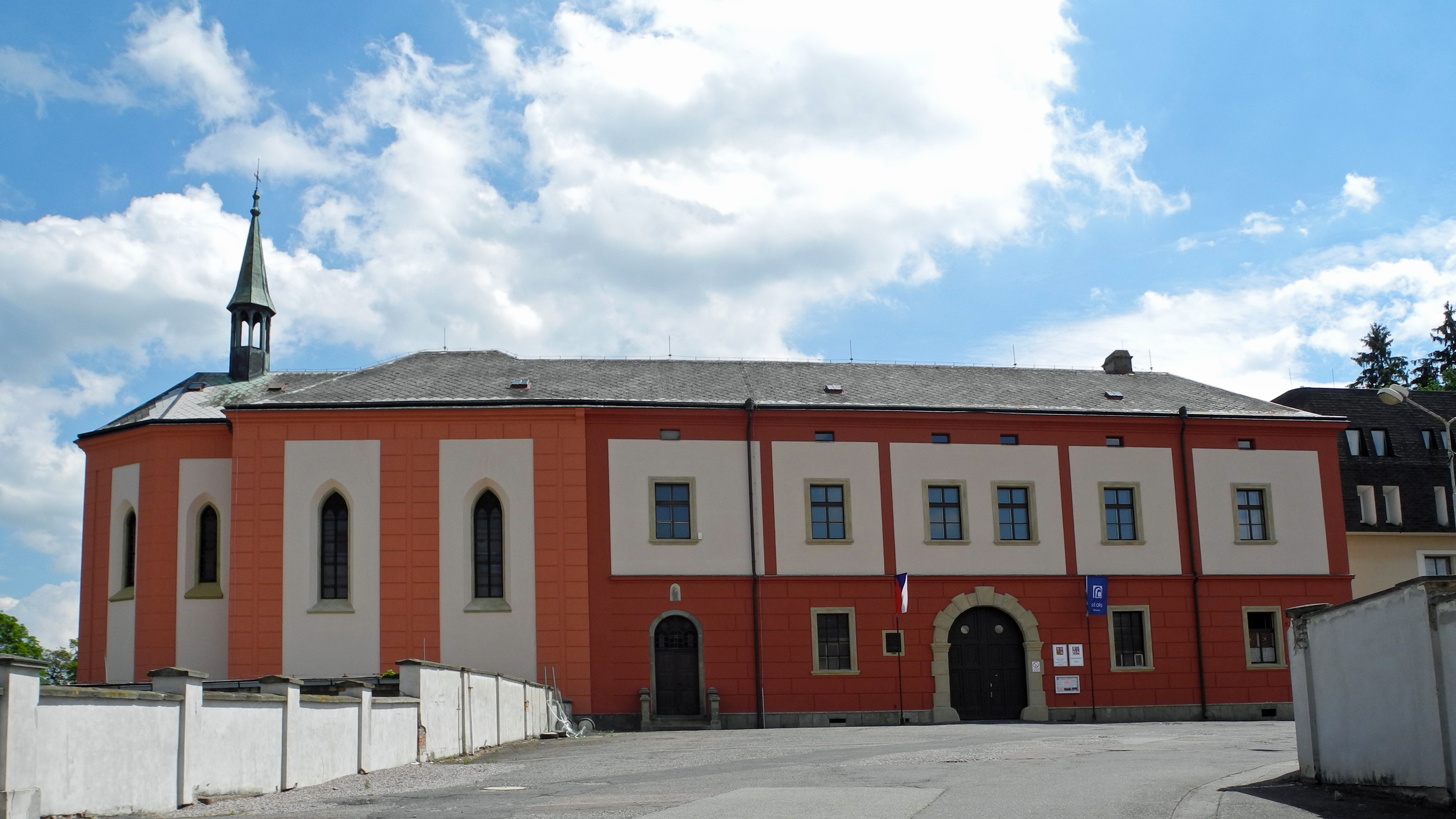
Žamberk Castle

The largest industrial employer based in the town is Bühler CZ, a manufacturer of food processing machines with more than 250 employees.

== Transport ==
The I/11 road from Hradec Králové to Šumperk runs through the town.

The railway station named Žamberk, which serves the town, is located in the territory of the neighbouring Dlouhoňovice. It lies on the railway line heading from Hradec Králové to Letohrad.

== Sights ==
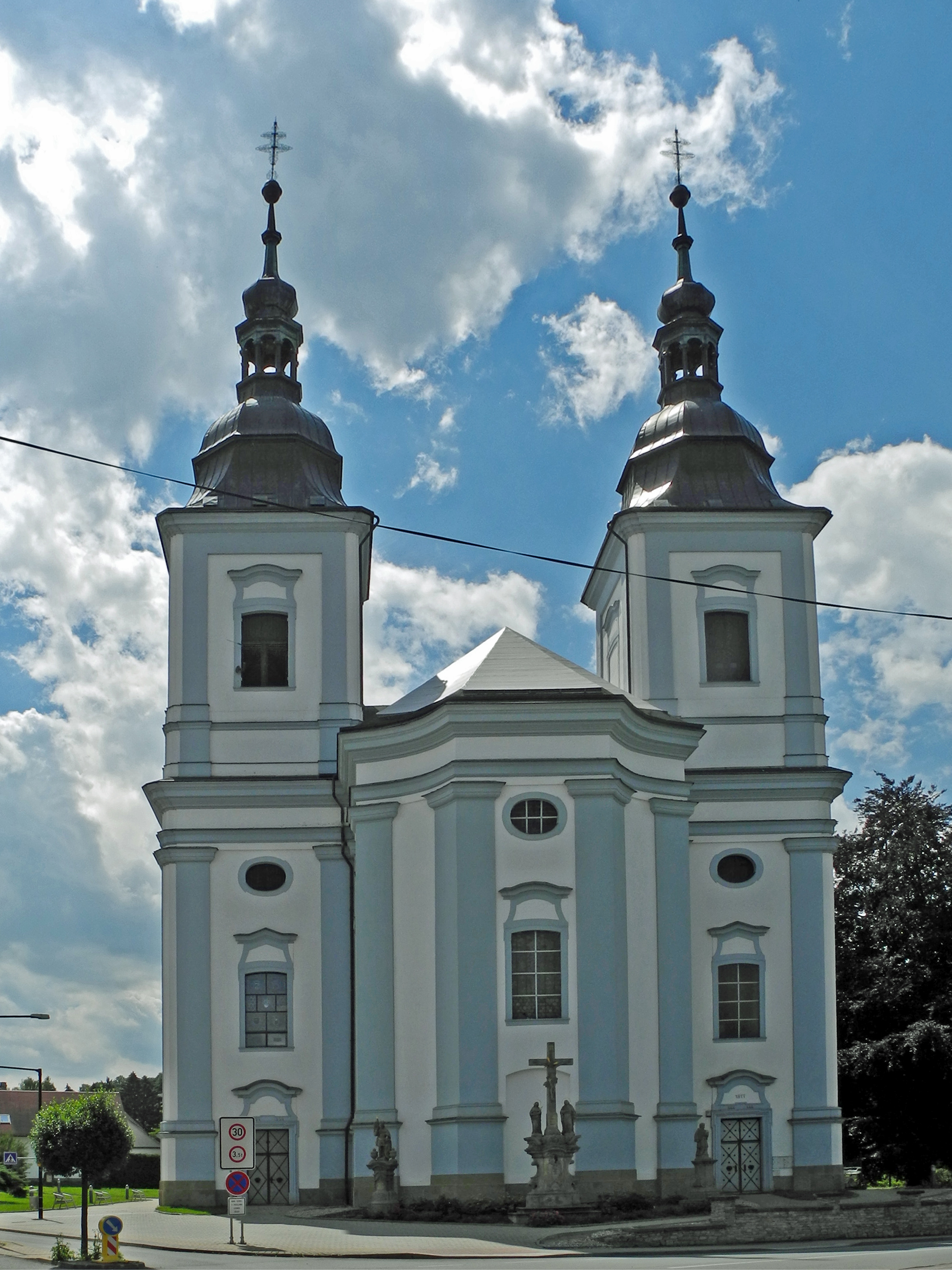
Church of Saint Wenceslaus

The historic centre is formed by the square Masarykovo náměstí and adjacent streets. The main landmark of the square is the town hall. It is a Neoclassical building from 1810. In the middle of the square are a Marian column from the late 17th century and a fountain with sculptures of a nymph and a centaur.

The Church of Saint Wencleslaus is the highest building in the town. Its existence was first mentioned in 1348.

The Žamberk Castle is a Renaissance building that includes the Chapel of the Assumption of the Virgin Mary and a castle park, probably founded in the 19th century. The castle is inaccessible to the public.

The Jewish cemetery was established in around 1700 and today there is a small exposition on Jewish population in the town.

== Notable people ==
- Prokop Diviš (1698–1765), inventor and Catholic priest
- Theodor Brorsen (1819–1895), Danish astronomer and botanist; worked here
- Eduard Albert (1841–1900), Austrian surgeon, professor and historian
- Václav F. Kumpošt (1846–1874), journalist and writer
- August Seydler (1849–1891), astronomer, theoretical physicist and professor
- Jan Vilímek (1860–1938), illustrator and painter
- Josef Ježek (1884–1969), politician
- Oldřich Marek (1911–1986), entomologist and teacher; worked here
- Petr Eben (1929–2007), composer

== Twin towns – sister cities ==
Žamberk is twinned with:

- Fresagrandinaria, Italy
- Nowa Sól, Poland
- Püttlingen, Germany
- Rice Lake, United States
- Saint-Michel-sur-Orge, France
- Senftenberg, Germany
- Senftenberg, Austria
- Veszprém, Hungary

Žamberk also has friendly relations with Miharu in Japan.
