= Emerich Ullmann =

Austrian surgeon

- Born: 23 February 1861
- Died: 1937 (aged 75–76)
- Occupation: surgeon
- Known for: renal transplantation pioneer
- Notable work: first successful kidney transplant in a dog (1902)

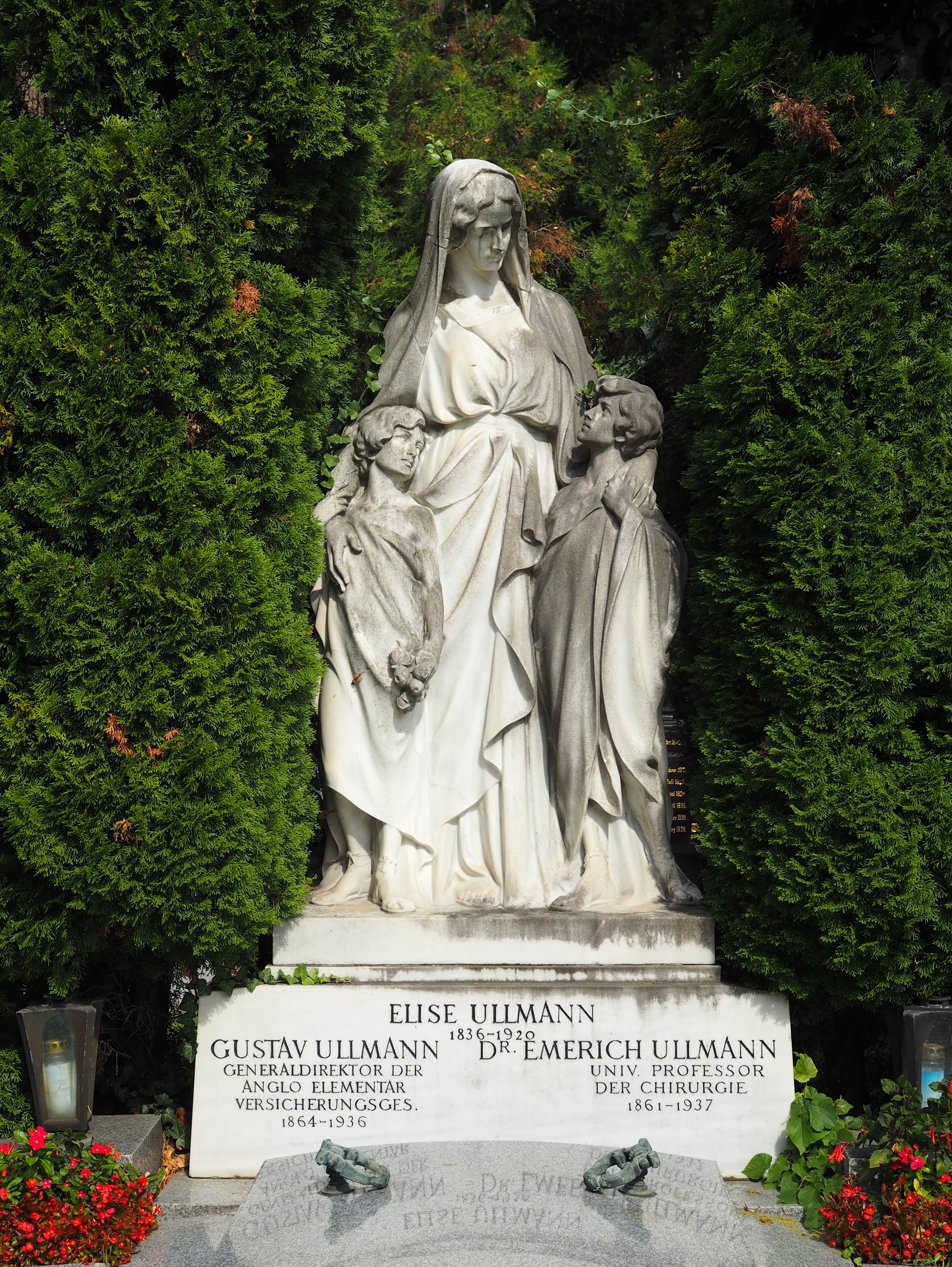
Grave of Emerich Ullmann, Vienna

Emerich Ullmann (23 February 1861 – 1937) was an Austrian surgeon who was a native of Pécs.

In 1884, he received his doctorate in Vienna, and afterwards worked in the surgical department of Theodor Billroth (1829–1894). Briefly, he worked as was an assistant to Louis Pasteur (1822–1895) in Paris, where he was involved with research of antisera against rabies. In 1885, he returned to the University of Vienna at the first department of surgery.

Ullmann was a pioneer of renal transplantation research. In 1902, he performed the first successful renal autotransplantation in a dog. Reportedly, the kidney remained functional for five days. Soon afterwards, he was unsuccessful in trying the first renal xenotransplantation (cross-species transplant) between a goat and a dog. Following an unsuccessful attempt to transplant a pig's kidney into a human patient, who was in the final stage of renal disease, he stopped research of kidney transplantation.

He also conducted investigations of tissue and other organ (non-kidney) transplants.

== Associated eponyms ==
- Ullmann's line: The line of displacement in spondylolisthesis.
- Ullmann's syndrome: A systemic angiomatosis due to multiple arteriovenous malformations.
