= Eduard Albert =

Czech surgeon and historian

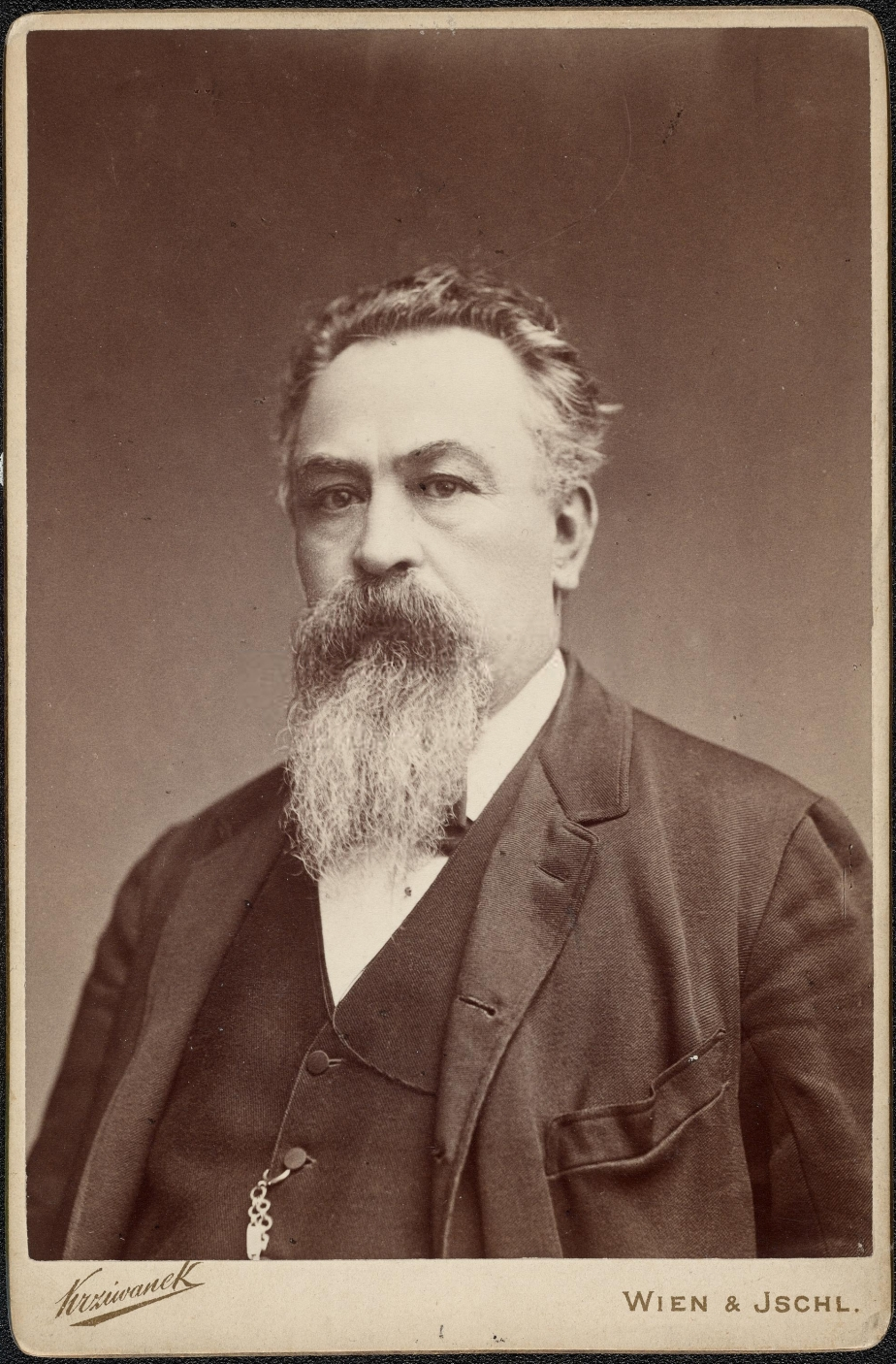
- Dr Eduard Albert
- Born: 20 January 1841; Žamberk, Bohemia, Austrian Empire
- Died: 26 September 1900 (aged 59); Žamberk, Bohemia, Austria-Hungary
- Education: University of Vienna
- Occupation: Surgeon

Eduard Albert (20 January 1841 – 26 September 1900) was a Czech surgeon, professor and historian.

== Life ==
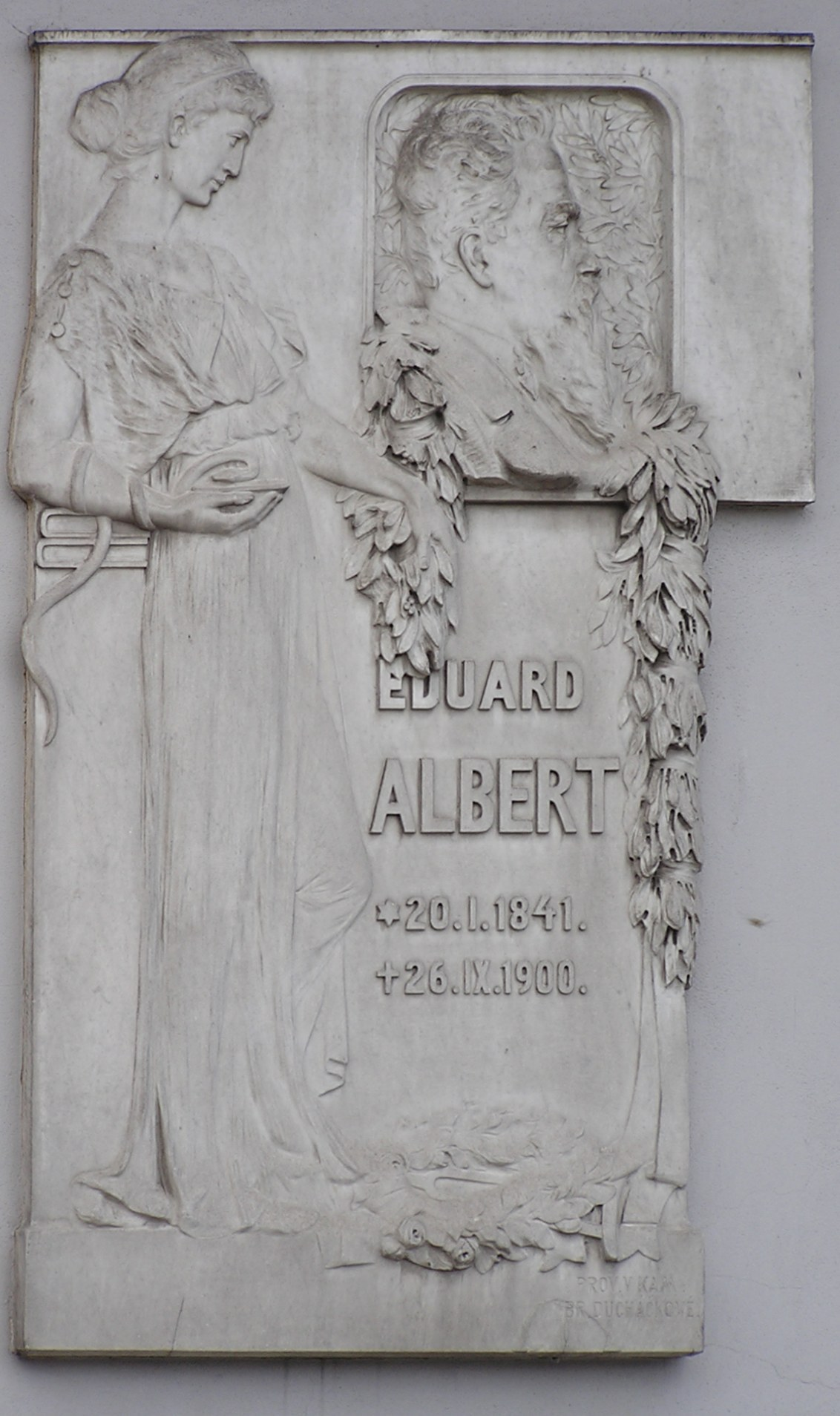
Plaque on Eduard Albert's family house in Žamberk

Eduard Albert was born on 20 January 1841in Žamberk, Bohemia, in the family of clockmaker František Albert and Kateřina Albertová (née Zdobnická). He married in 1868 with Marie Pietschová and they had two children, but one of them died in early childhood. Further notable people from their family were also František Albert (1856–1923), surgeon and writer; Tereza Svatová (1858–1940), writer; and Kateřina Thomová (1861–1952), creatress of amateur theatre in Žamberk and founder of municipal museum in Žamberk.

Eduard Albert studied medicine at the University of Vienna, where he earned his doctorate in 1867. At Vienna he was a student of Salomon Stricker (1834–1898) and Johann von Dumreicher (1815–1880). From 1873 to 1881, he was a professor of surgery in Innsbruck, where he introduced mandatory antiseptic treatment for wounds. In 1881, Albert attained the chair of surgery in Vienna, where he remained until 1900. He was succeeded at Innsbruck in 1881 by Carl Nicoladoni (1847–1902). Albert died of a stroke on 26 September 1900 in Žamberk.

Albert is remembered for pioneer research in the field of orthopedic surgery, in particular work involving tarsal and shoulder arthrodesis for paralysis and recurring joint dislocations. Among his better-known students were Adolf Lorenz (1854–1946), "The Bloodless Surgeon of Vienna", nephrologist Emerich Ullmann (1861–1937) and Antonio Grossich (1849–1926), who in 1908 introduced a procedure for applying the operative field with 10% tincture of iodine (at first in emergency surgeries, later on for all types of surgery).

== Works ==
- Diagnostika chirurgických nemocí (1876)
- Učebnice chirurgie a nauky operační (1877)
- Paměti Žamberské (1889)

== Gallery ==
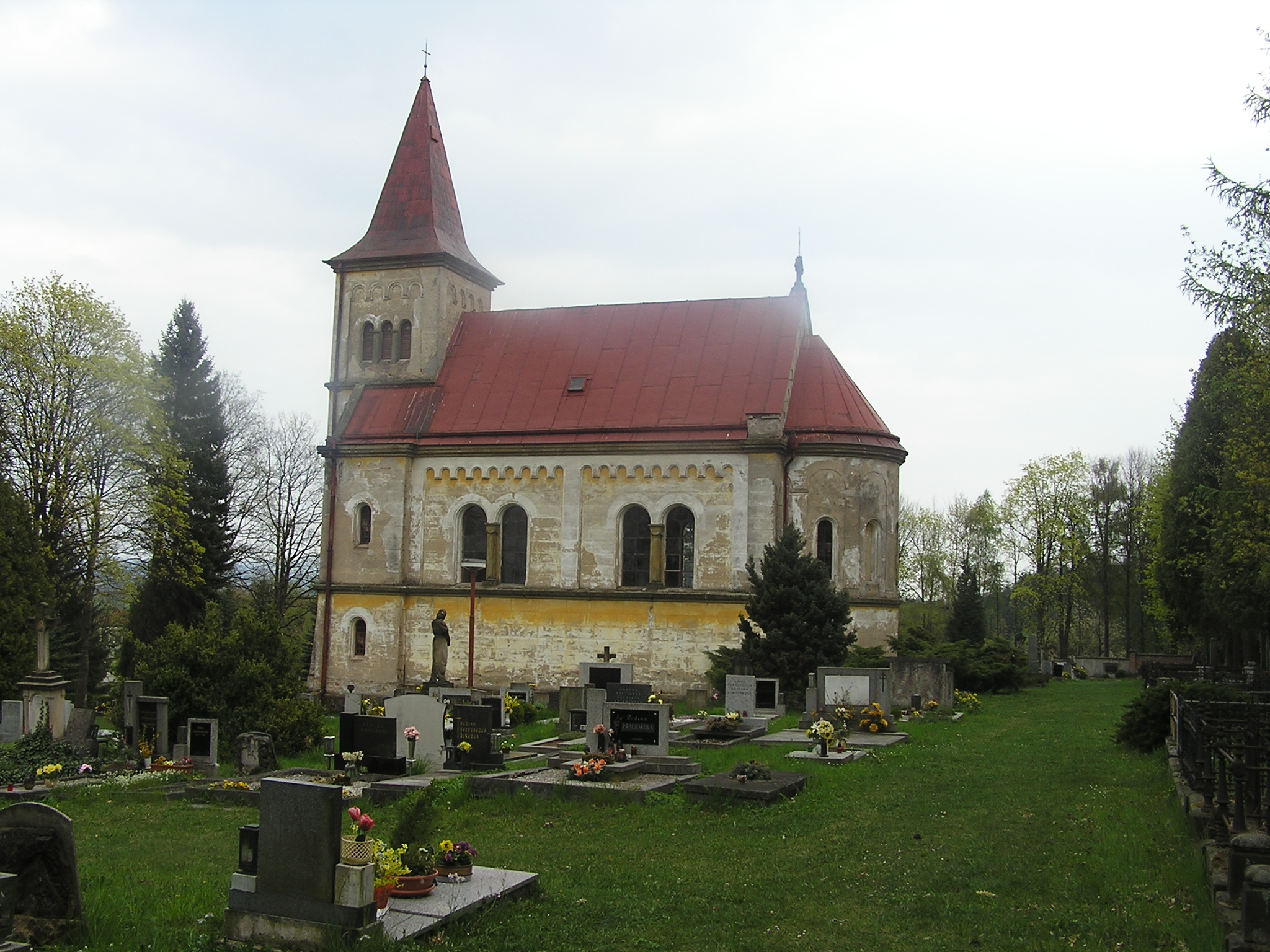
Chapel of Saint Adalbert in Žamberk's graveyard, built at expense of E. Albert

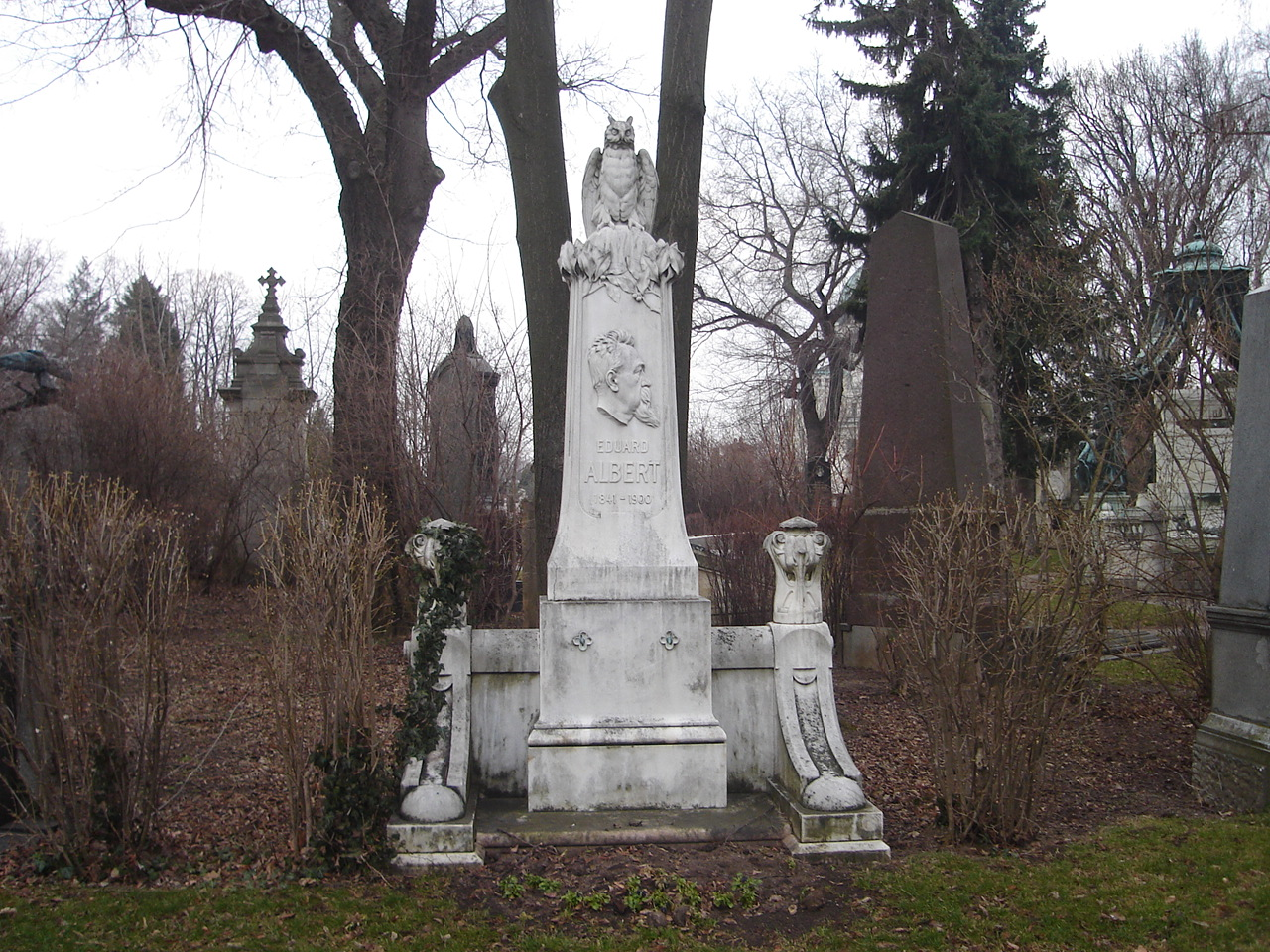
Grave of Eduard Albert in a cemetery in Vienna
