= Žampach (Ústí nad Orlicí District) =

- Municipality
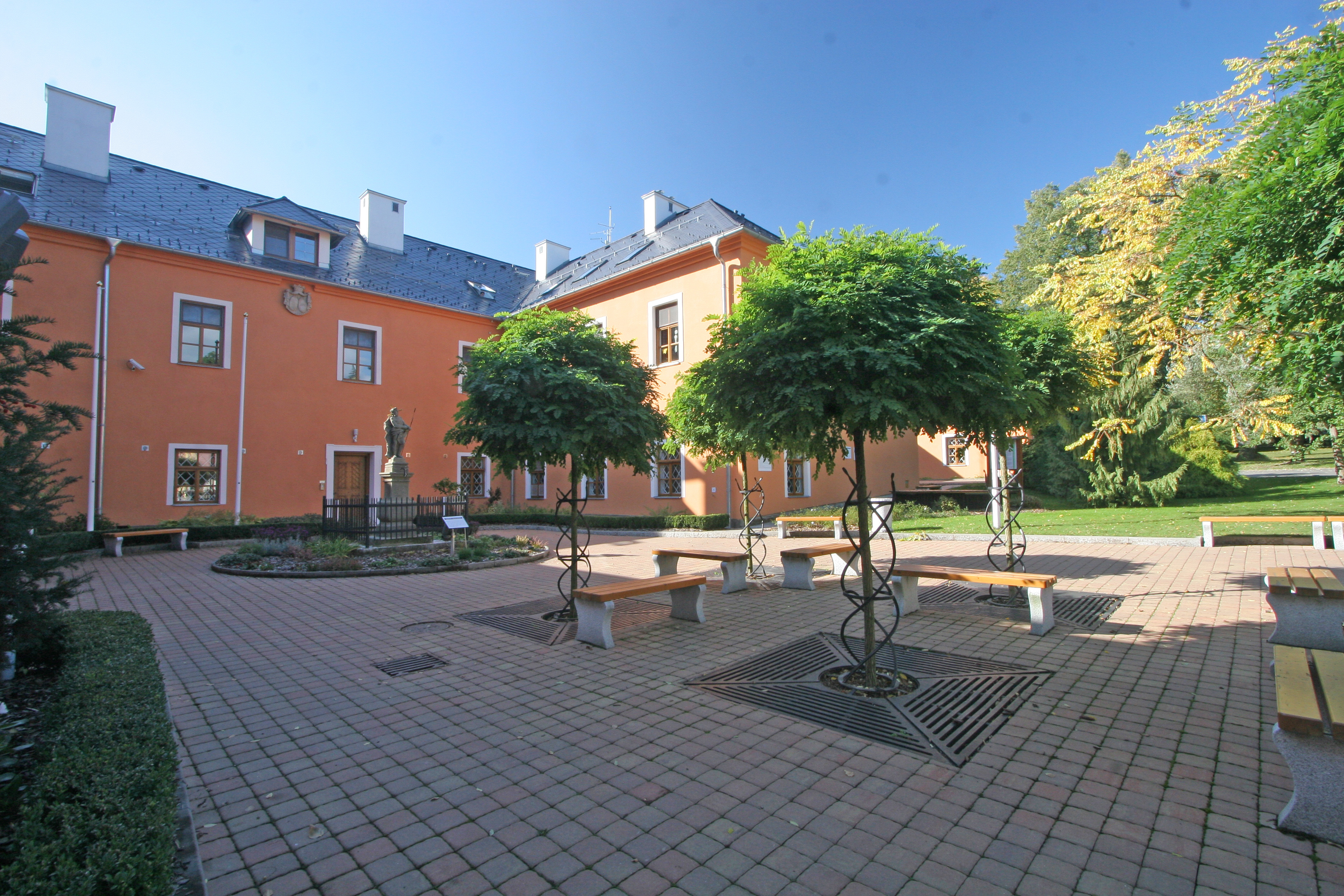
- Žampach Castle

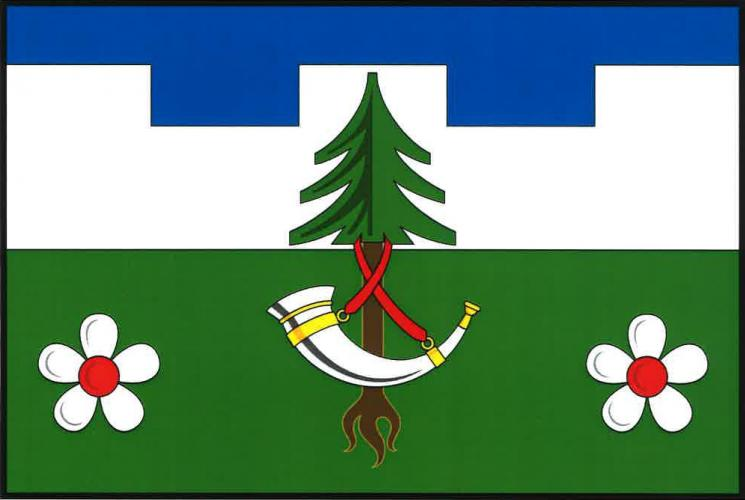
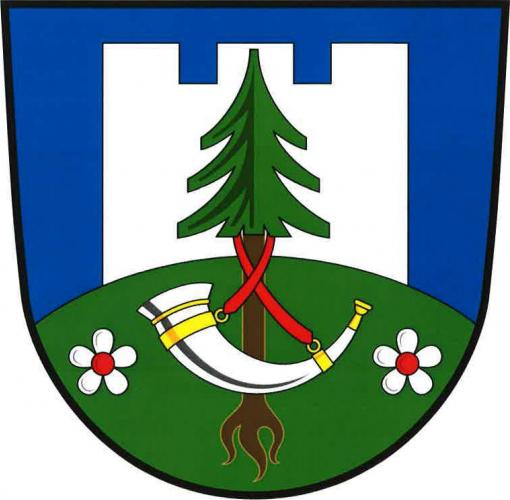
- Flag Coat of arms

- Location in the Czech Republic
- Coordinates: 50°2′17″N 16°25′38″E
- Country: Czech Republic
- Region: Pardubice
- District: Ústí nad Orlicí
- First mentioned: 1309

Area
  - Total: 5.55 km^{2} (2.14 sq mi)
- Elevation: 382 m (1,253 ft)

Population (2026-01-01)
  - Total: 298
  - Density: 53.7/km^{2} (139/sq mi)
- Time zone: UTC+1 (CET)
  - Summer (DST): UTC+2 (CEST)
- Postal code: 564 01
- Website: www.obeczampach.cz

Žampach is a municipality and village in Ústí nad Orlicí District in the Pardubice Region of the Czech Republic. It has about 300 inhabitants.

== Administrative division ==
Žampach consists of two municipal parts (in brackets population according to the 2021 census):

- Žampach (253)
- Hlavná (39)

== Demographics ==
Historical population
Year	Pop.	±%
1869	538	—
1880	496	−7.8%
1890	561	+13.1%
1900	521	−7.1%
1910	510	−2.1%
1921	397	−22.2%
1930	382	−3.8%
1950	237	−38.0%
1961	388	+63.7%
1970	262	−32.5%
1980	303	+15.6%
1991	326	+7.6%
2001	304	−6.7%
2011	294	−3.3%
2021	292	−0.7%
Source: Censuses

== Sights ==
In Žampach there are the early Baroque Žampach Castle and ruins of the former medieval Gothic castle.
