= Senftenberg, Austria =

Senftenberg
- Municipality
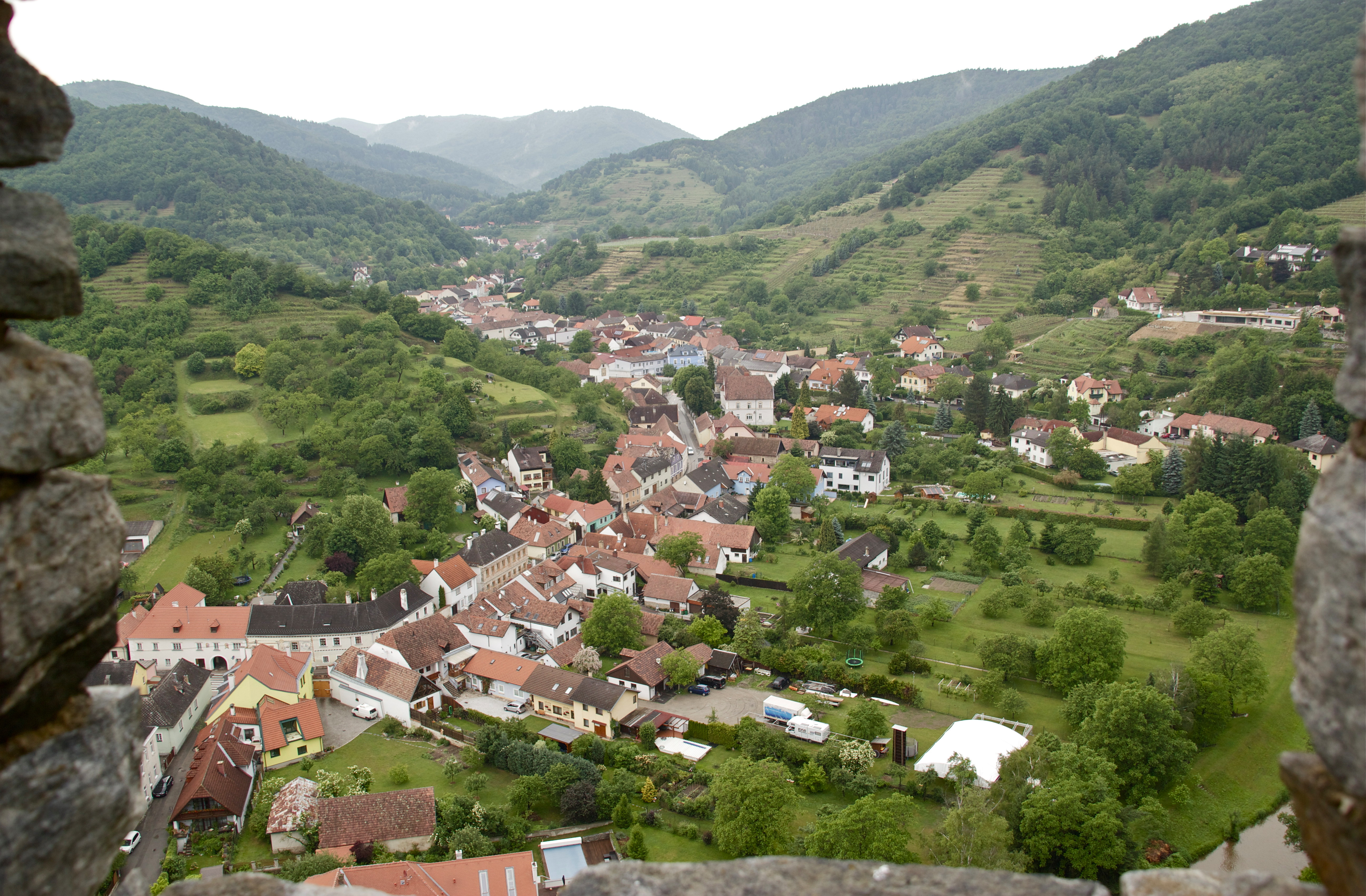
- Senftenberg seen from Burgruine Senftenberg

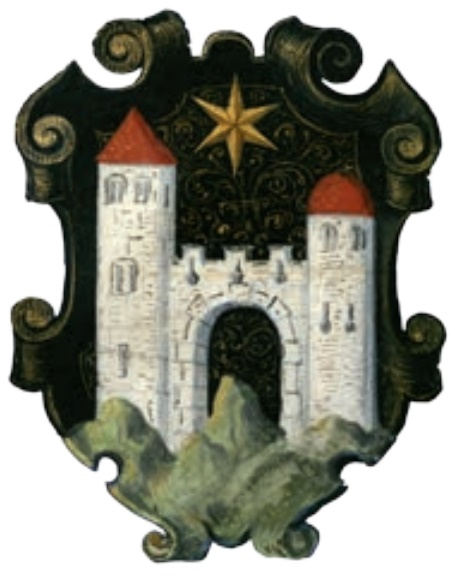
- Coat of arms

- Location within Austria
- Coordinates: 48°26′N 15°33′E
- Country: Austria
- State: Lower Austria
- District: Krems-Land

Government
  - Mayor: Markus Klamminger (ÖVP)

Area
  - Total: 34.77 km^{2} (13.42 sq mi)
- Elevation: 254 m (833 ft)

Population (2018-01-01)
  - Total: 1,977
  - Density: 56.86/km^{2} (147.3/sq mi)
- Time zone: UTC+1 (CET)
  - Summer (DST): UTC+2 (CEST)
- Postal code: 3541
- Area code: 02719
- Website: www.senftenberg.at

Senftenberg is a town in the district of Krems-Land in the Austrian state of Lower Austria.

== Geography ==
The municipality consists of six subdivisions:

- Imbach (population: 580)
- Meislingeramt (population: 55)
- Priel (population: 123)
- Reichaueramt (population: 60)
- Senftenberg (population: 1046)
- Senftenbergeramt (population: 107)

== Population ==
Historical population
Year	Pop.	±%
1869	1,694	—
1880	1,634	−3.5%
1890	1,654	+1.2%
1900	1,776	+7.4%
1910	2,015	+13.5%
1923	1,965	−2.5%
1934	1,907	−3.0%
1939	1,922	+0.8%
1951	2,017	+4.9%
1961	1,875	−7.0%
1971	1,937	+3.3%
1981	1,986	+2.5%
1991	2,067	+4.1%
2001	1,971	−4.6%
2011	1,937	−1.7%

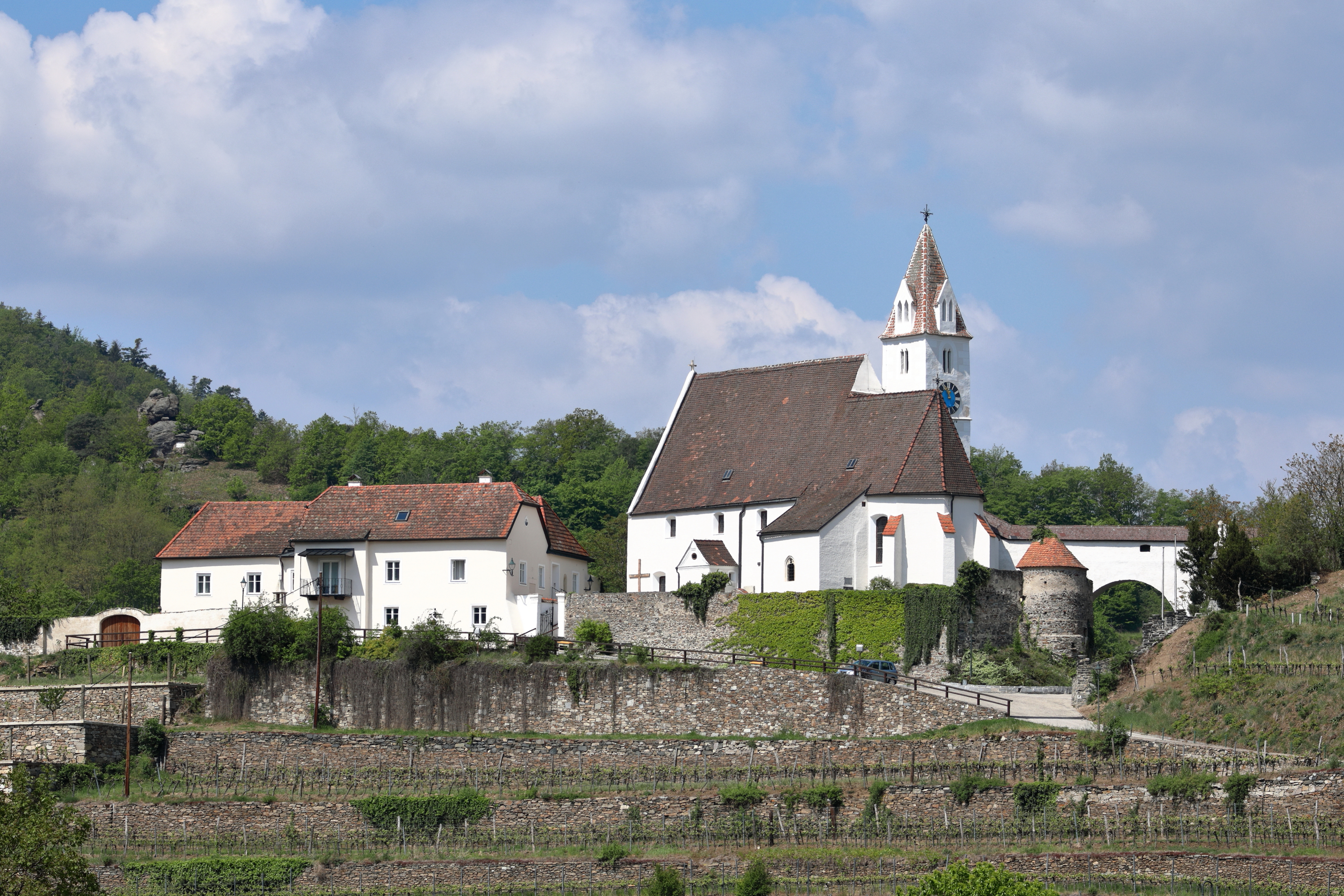
Parish church and rectory

== Sights ==
- Burgruine Senftenberg
