= Pardubice hlavní nádraží =

Railway station in the Czech Republic

Coordinates: 50.032°N 15.757°E

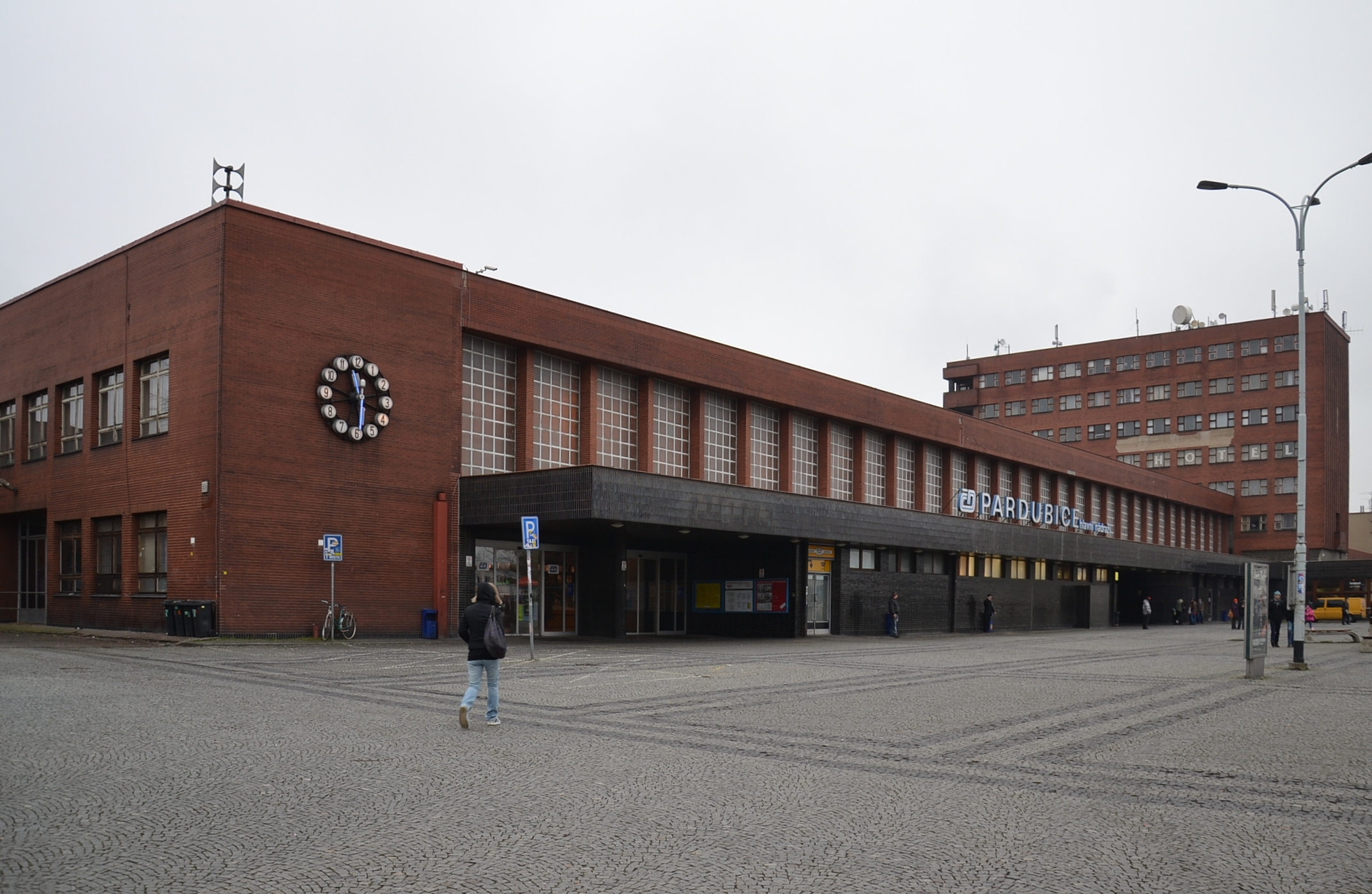
- Main entrance

General information
- Location: Pardubice; Czech Republic
- Owner: Czech Republic
- Platforms: 6 (9)

Construction
- Architect: Anton Jüngling; Josef Danda; Karel Řepa; Karel Kalvoda

Other information
- Station code: 54536136

History
- Opened: 20 August 1845; 181 years ago
- Rebuilt: 1857; 1958
- Electrified: 1957
Services
Preceding station	České dráhy	Following station
Kolín towards Praha hl.n.	EuroNight	Olomouc main towards Humenné
Kolín towards Praha hl.n.	EuroNight	Choceň towards Budapest Nyugati
Praha hl.n. towards Františkovy Lázně or Praha hl.n.	SuperCity Pendolino	Olomouc main towards Ostrava
Praha hl.n. Terminus	Railjet	Česká Třebová towards Graz
Kolín towards Praha hl.n.	EC	Česká Třebová towards Hamburg-Altona
Local trains
Přelouč toward Prague	Regional fast trains	Choceň toward Brno or Olomouc occasional terminus
Pardubice-Rosice nad Labem toward Liberec or Havlíčkův Brod	Regional fast trains	Terminus
Pardubice-Rosice nad Labem toward Hradec Králové or Havlíčkův Brod	Stopping trains	Terminus
Terminus	Stopping trains	Pardubice-Pardubičky toward Česká Třebová or Letohrad
Preceding station	Esko Prague	Following station
Pardubice-Svítkov towards Praha Masarykovo nádraží	S1	Terminus
Preceding station	Leo Express	Following station
Praha hl.n. Terminus	Leo Express	Olomouc hl.n. towards Bohumín
Location

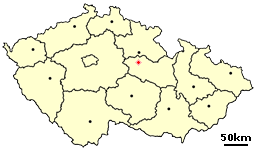
Location of Pardubice in the Czech Republic

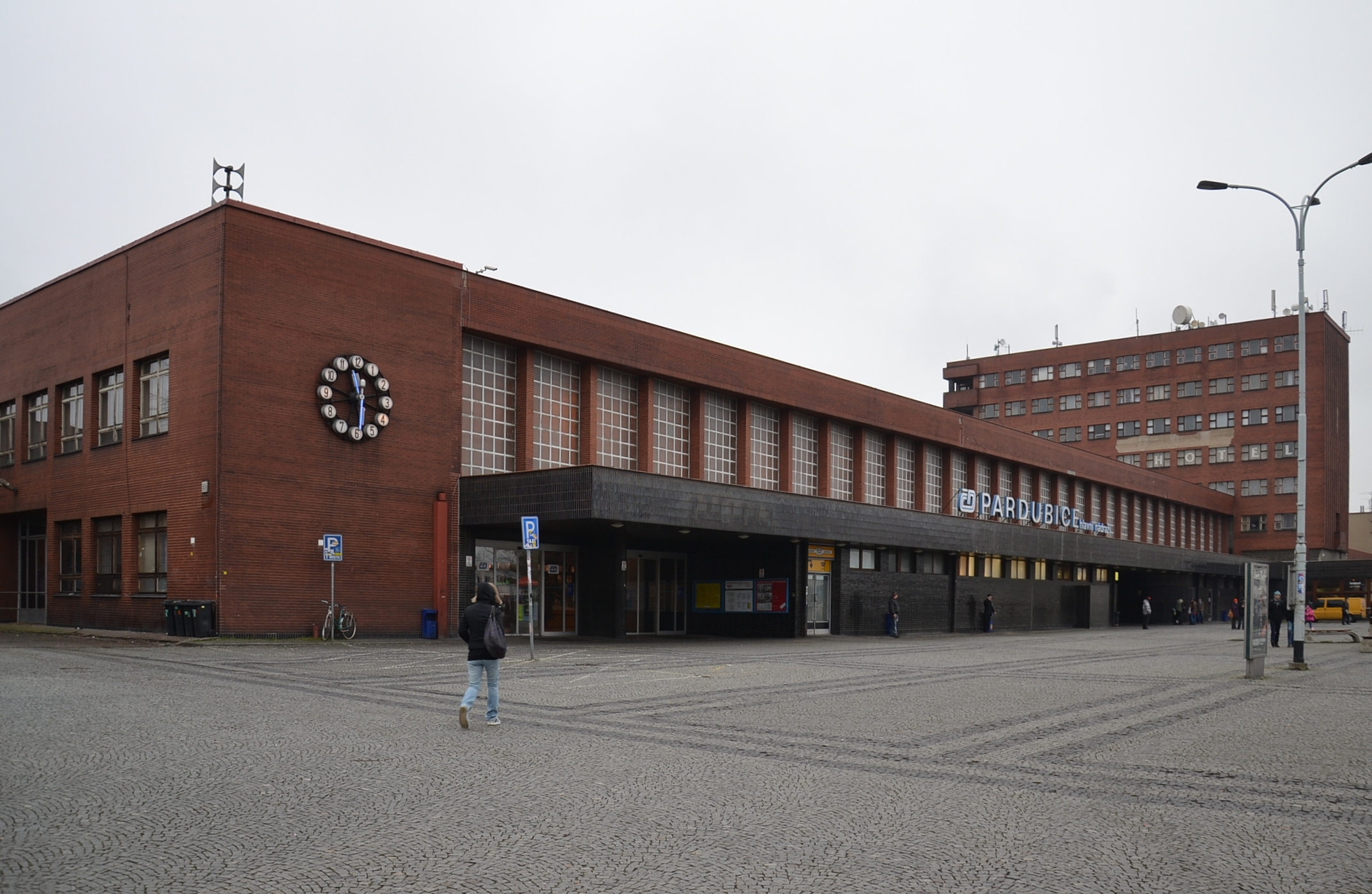
Front view of station building

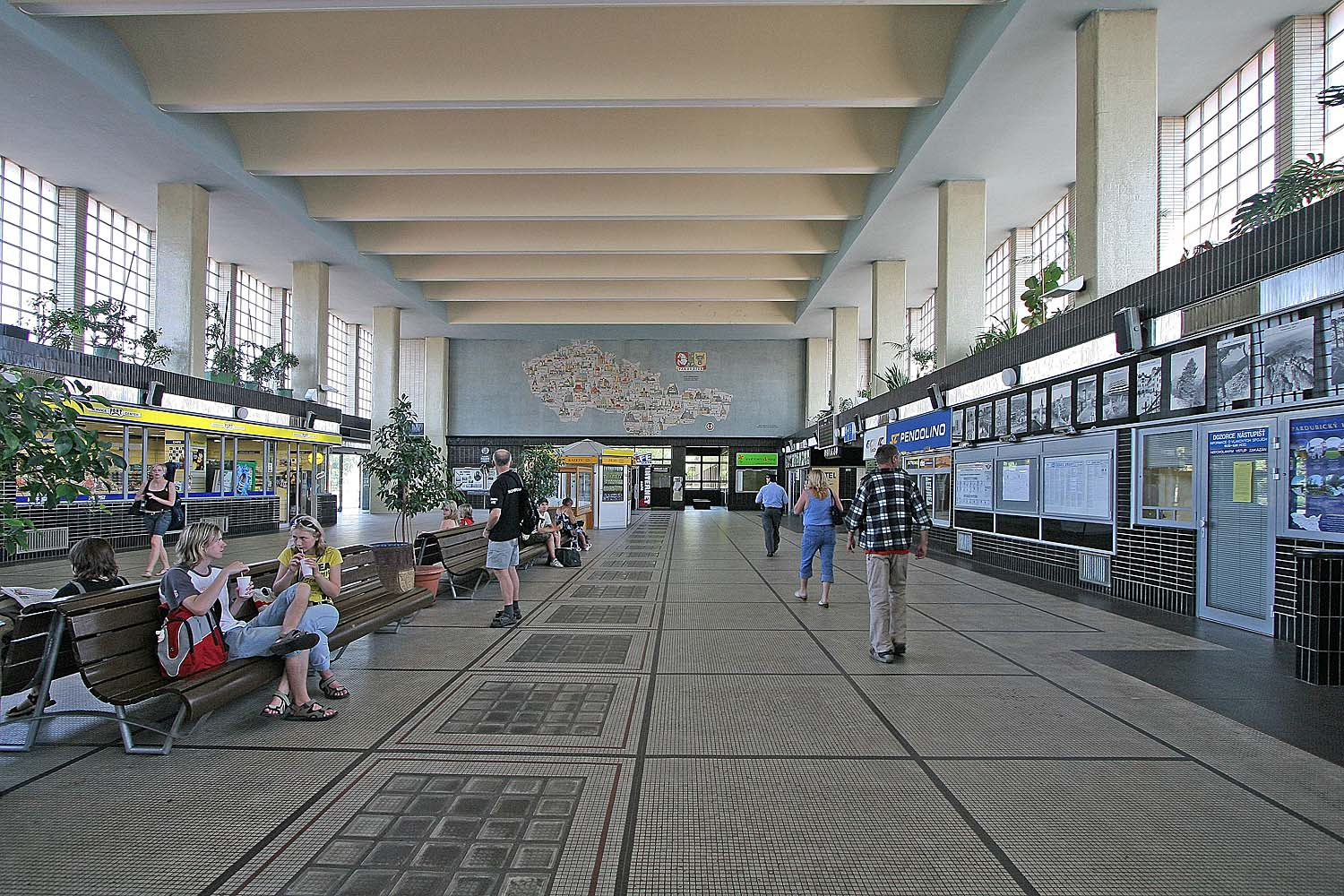
Passenger hall

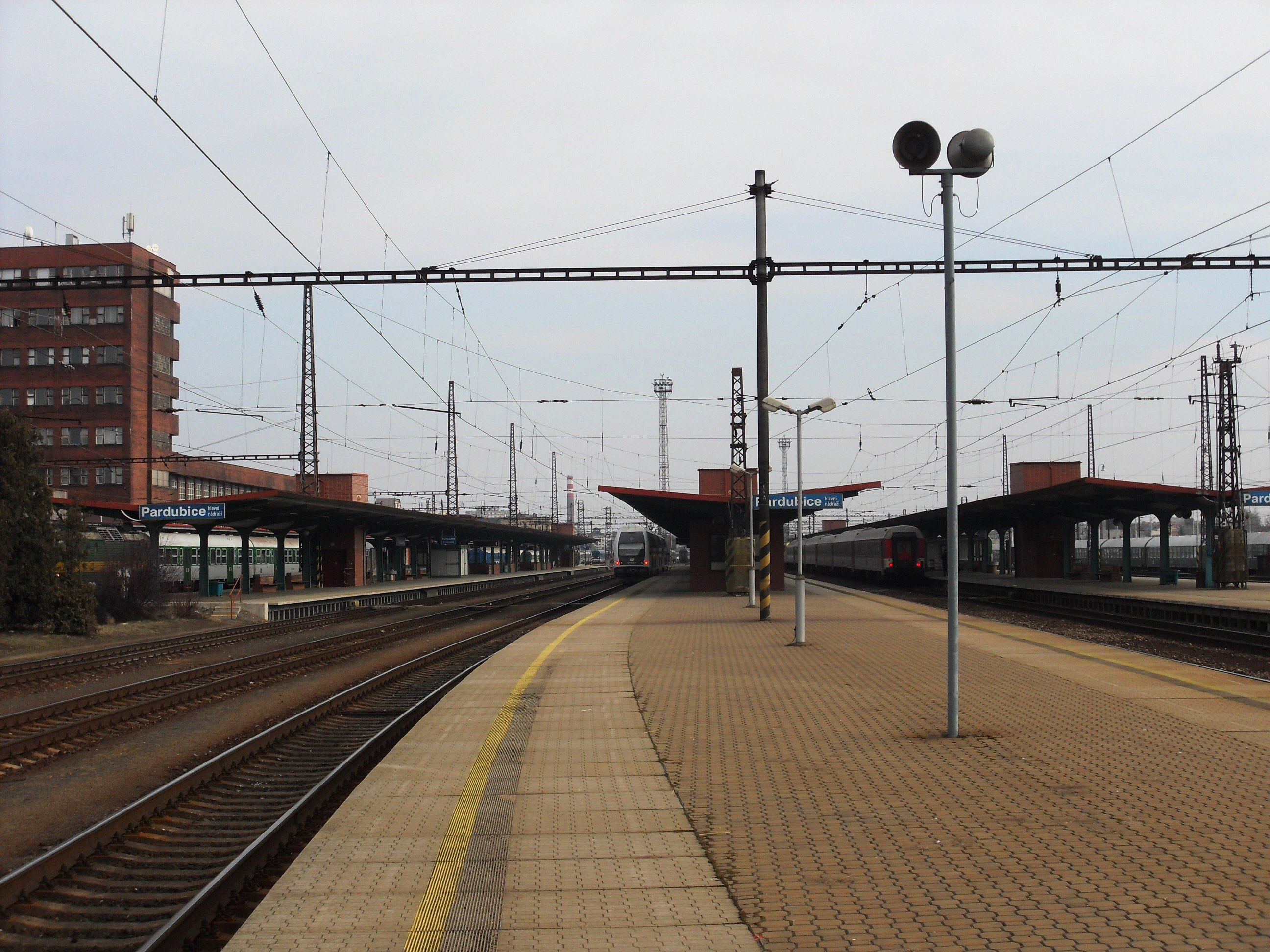
Platforms as seen from the west

Pardubice hlavní nádraží (lit. 'Pardubice main railway station') is a railway station in Pardubice in the Czech Republic. It is one of the largest railway stations in the country. It is located about 1.8 kilometres (1.1 mi) west-south-west from city centre of Pardubice, and an important railway network hub.

== History ==
Work on the railway connecting Prague and Olomouc started in 1842 and the line was finished in 1845. The construction was led by Jan Perner. A small railway station was opened on the same year, with four tracks, a roundhouse (výtopna) for eight steam locomotives and passenger hall covering two tracks. The building still exists and is used by the railway operator.

A line between Liberec and Pardubice was built during 1855–1859. In 1859, a new railway station was opened and used for both lines. A line between Pardubice and Německý Brod (now Havlíčkův Brod) was built during 1869–1871. Access to the railway turned a small town into a large industrial city.

In 1908, the station building was coupled with a glass hall over two tracks. In 1910, a locomotive repair shop was set up; it was rebuilt in 1924.

Factories in the city built industrial sidings to the main station: 37 lines had been constructed in 1908 and new ones were added after the war. Since the 1960s, this number dropped to 19 in 2000, and even these are not fully utilized.

Pardubice, a city with large petrochemical factories, was bombed several times during World War II. An air raid on 24 August 1944 damaged the station. All lines were shattered and the passenger hall was destroyed. After the war, repairs started and in October 1945 traffic was restored.

== New station ==
Architects Karel Řepa and Josef Danda started to work on the new station in 1947. Their design was a single floor large passenger hall with complete infrastructure connected to a seven-story administrative building. During 1951–1960, a block of flats was added to the complex. The new station was opened on May 1, 1958.

Since 1956 the lines in Pardubice have been electrified and work on improving them still continues. Work on the international railway corridor from Děčín to Břeclav (part of a Pan-European corridor) going through Pardubice had started in 1993 and was largely completed by 2004.

The station housed Sirius cinema, which closed at the end of 2006 after the first multiplex cinema opened in Pardubice. By 2023 the space had been converted into a hall. The station also formerly hosted a hotel, which was converted and reopened in 2023 as a training centre for Správa železnic – the Czech Railway Administration – at a cost of 574 million Czech koruna.

== The station today ==
The main railway station, operated by Správa železnic, is an important hub for both passenger and freight traffic. The station has connections to Prague, Brno, Vienna, Bratislava, Budapest and other cities and is served by InterCity, EuroCity, Pendolino and local trains. In station daily services of Arriva vlaky, České dráhy, LEO Express and RegioJet are operated.

After decades of use, the passenger hall became a rather dingy place where homeless people concentrate. In 2005, the reconstruction of stations in Pardubice and in neighbouring Hradec Králové began, with the intent to make them more attractive to the public. A four-year renovation project of the station, costing more than 6 billion koruna, resulted in new platforms and signalling equipment. A footbridge connecting the station with the Dukla housing estate, spanning 290 metres (950 ft), was completed in May 2024 as part of the work.

Pardubice has seven other railway stops in the city other than the main station. The stops Pardubice - Opočínek, Svítkov, Pardubičky and Černá za Bory are on the main line between Prague and Česká Třebová. Three more stops: Pardubice - Semtín, Rosice nad Labem and Pardubice závodiště, are on the train line connecting Hradec Králové with Havlíčkův Brod. An additional station, Pardubice centrum, opened in June 2024 to operate as a terminus for local trains to Hradec Králové and Chrudim.

== Provided services ==
- customer centre of Czech Railways
- restaurant and several fast food stalls
- bookstore
- lounge for first class passengers

== Connection with other transport ==
The central bus station of the city is located in the vicinity of the station. There is a taxi stand in front of the station hall.
