= Choceň railway station =

Railway station in Choceň, Czech Republic

Choceň
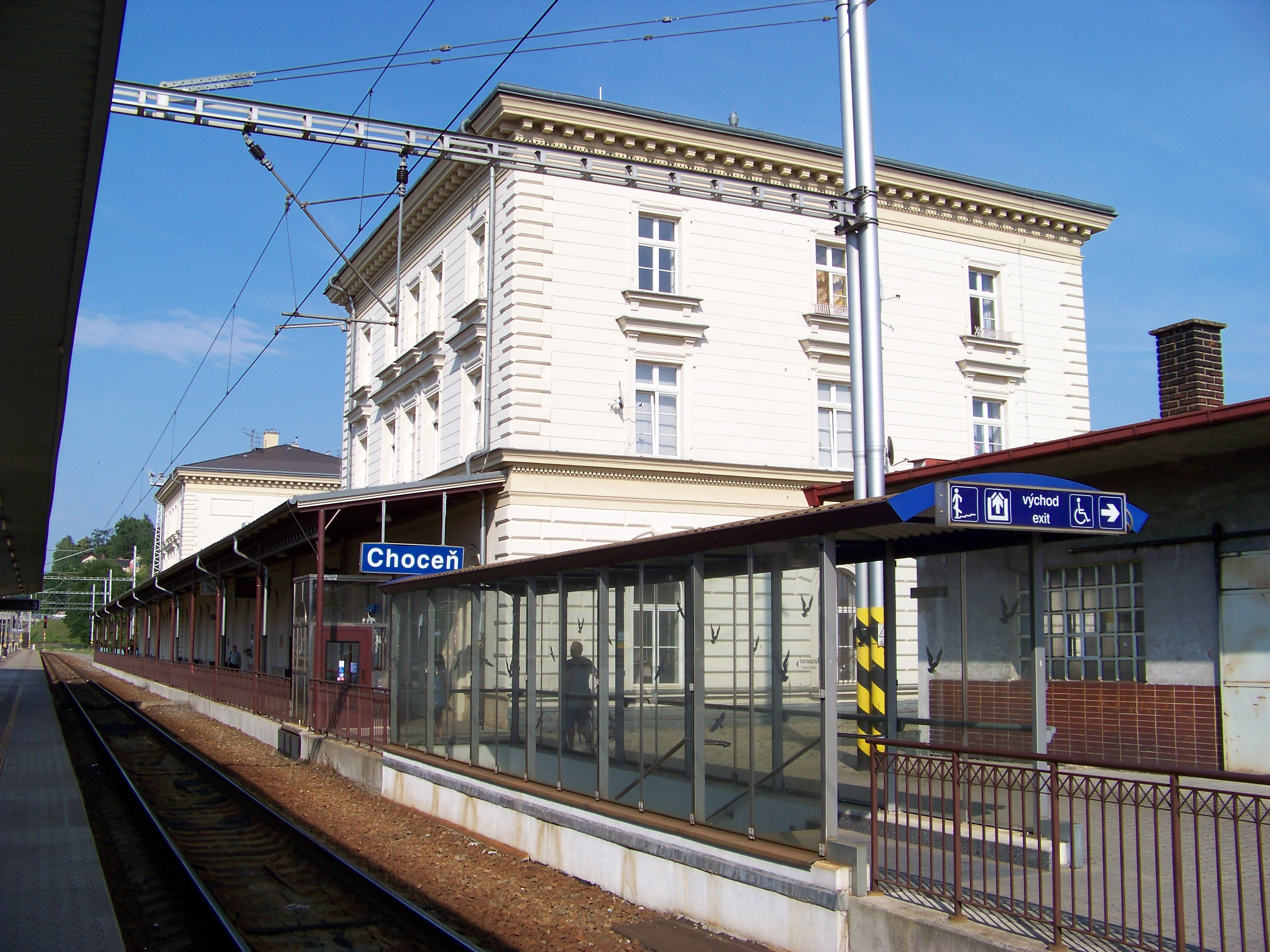
- Choceň station

General information
- Location: Choceň; Czech Republic
- Coordinates: 49°59′38″N 16°13′23″E
- Owner: Czech Republic
- Lines: Kolín – Česká Třebová; Choceň – Litomyšl; Choceň – Hradec Králové – Velký Osek
- Platforms: 8
- Tracks: 11

Construction
- Architect: Anton Jüngling

Other information
- Station code: 54538132

History
- Opened: 20 August 1845
Location

Choceň (Czech: Nádraží Choceň) is a railway station located in Choceň, Czech Republic. The station is located on the Kolín – Česká Třebová railway (Line 010), Choceň – Litomyšl railway (Line 018) and Choceň – Hradec Králové – Velký Osek railway (Line 020). The train services are operated by České dráhy and other carriers. In June 2005, a two year refurbishment of the station was completed.

== Train services ==
The following services currently call at the station:

- Prague – Kolín – Pardubice – Ústí nad Orlicí – Česká Třebová – Brno
- Kolín – Pardubice – Ústí nad Orlicí – Česká Třebová

Preceding station	Czech Railways	Following station
Pardubice toward Prague	Regional fast trains	Ústí nad Orlicí toward Brno or Luhačovice
Újezd u Chocně toward Hradec Králové	Stopping trains	Brandýs nad Orlicí toward Česká Třebová or Letohrad
Sruby toward Pardubice	Stopping trains	Brandýs nad Orlicí toward Česká Třebová or Letohrad
Dvořisko toward Litomyšl	Stopping trains	Brandýs nad Orlicí toward Česká Třebová or Letohrad
