= Rondocubism =

Art style

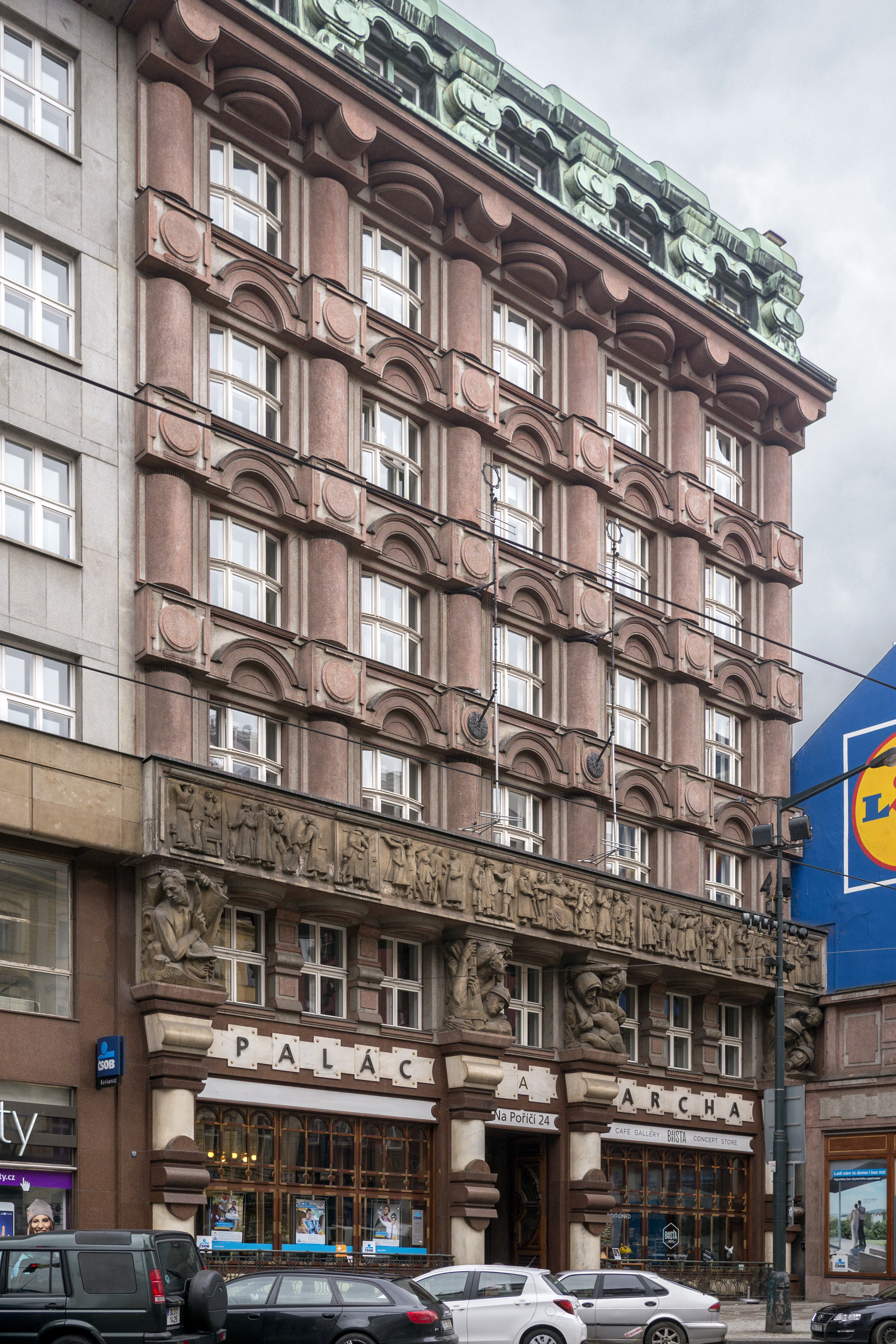
Legiobanka in Prague, Na poříčí Street

Czech Art Deco, Legiobank style, National style, National decorativeness, Curved Cubism, Rondocubism or Third Cubist style is a series of terms used to describe the characteristic style of architecture and applied arts, which existed mainly during the First Czechoslovak Republic. In the beginning, this particular style was completely neglected. Some rehabilitation has taken place since the 1950s. In the 1990s, attempts were made to place this specifically Czech style in the context of European Art Deco.

The style is "characterised by a striking wealth of colour and profusion of ornaments, probably derived from folklore sources."

== History ==
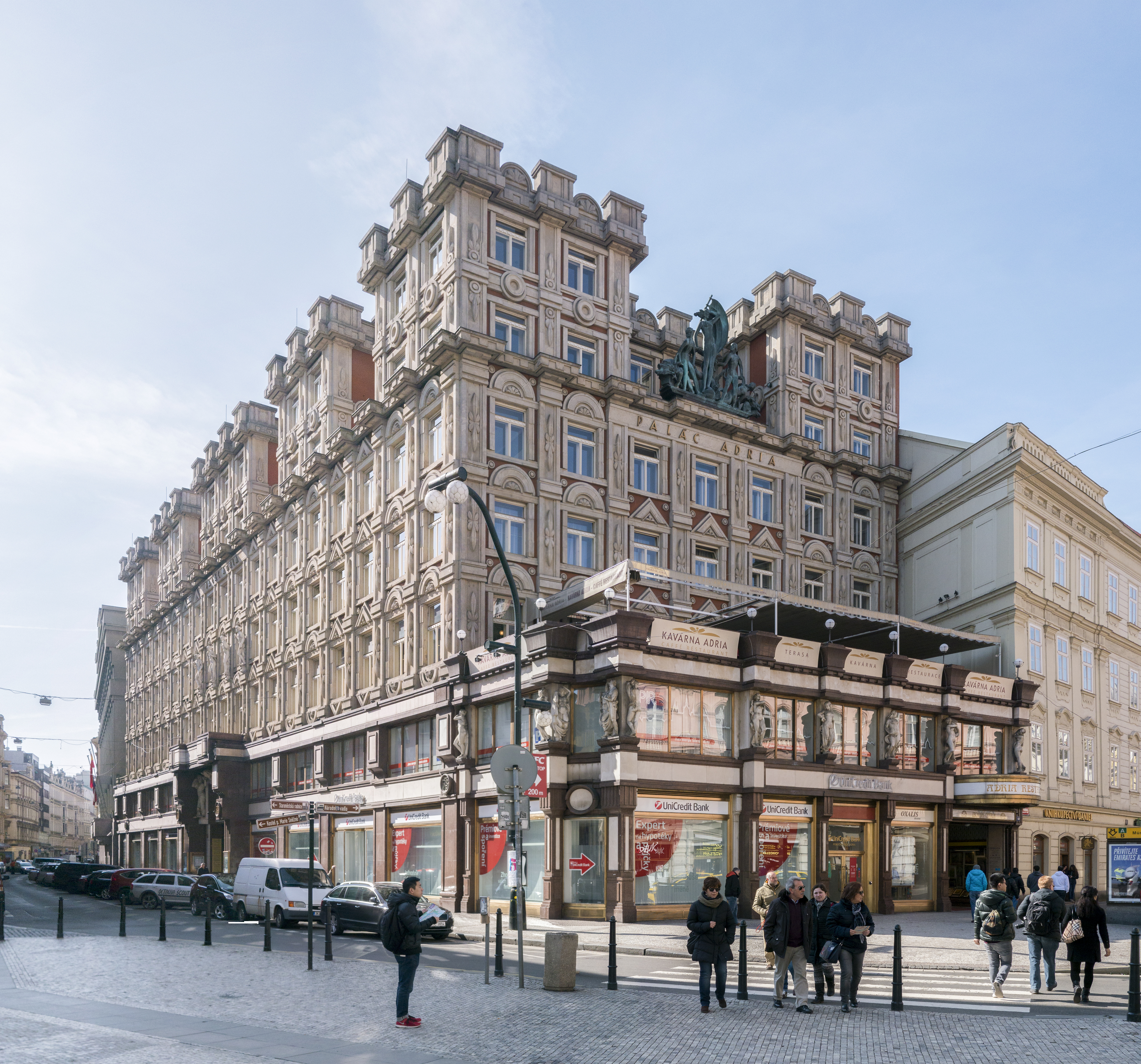
Adria Palace, Prague

Rondocubism developed after the First World War in the newly formed Czechoslovakia and became the national style for a short time, but was replaced by functionalism as early as in mid-1920s. It is characterized by the introduction of round forms such as semicircles, circles and ovals, which were intended to evoke echoes of the national Slavic traditions. Rondocubism was preferred in Prague, but was also used in industrial architecture in the surrounding area. Several rondocubist buildings were built also in Slovakia, mainly in Bratislava, and Subcarpathian Ruthenia, mainly Uzhhorod. The main works of architectural Rondocubism are the commercial building of the Legion Bank, or Legiobanka, by Josef Gočár and the Adria Palace by Pavel Janák in Prague.

== Architecture ==
=== Prague ===
- Pavel Janák – Villa in Hodkovičky (1921–1922)
- Josef Gočár – Legiobanka (1921–1923)
- Pavel Janák – Adria Palace (1923–1924)
- Ladislav Machoň – Josef and Karel Capek Villa (1923–1924)
- Alois Dryák – Radiopalác (1922–1925)

=== Pardubice ===
- Pavel Janák, František Kysela – Pardubice Crematorium (1921–1923)
- Josef Gočár – Anglobanka (1924–1925)
- Ladislav Machoň – Machoňova Arcade (1924–1925)
- Karel Řepa – Viktor Kříž Villa (1925)

=== Děčín ===
- Jaroslav Herink

=== Liberec ===
- Franz Radetzky (1929)

=== Bratislava ===
- Klement Šilinger – Institute of anatomy of the Faculty of Medicine of Comenius University (1925)
- František Krupka – Higschool internate (1925)
- Dušan Jurkovič – Legiodomy (1923)

=== Uzhhorod ===
- Several buildings in Malyi Galagov

== Sculpture ==
- Josef Drahoňovský
- Jaroslav Horejc

== Painting ==
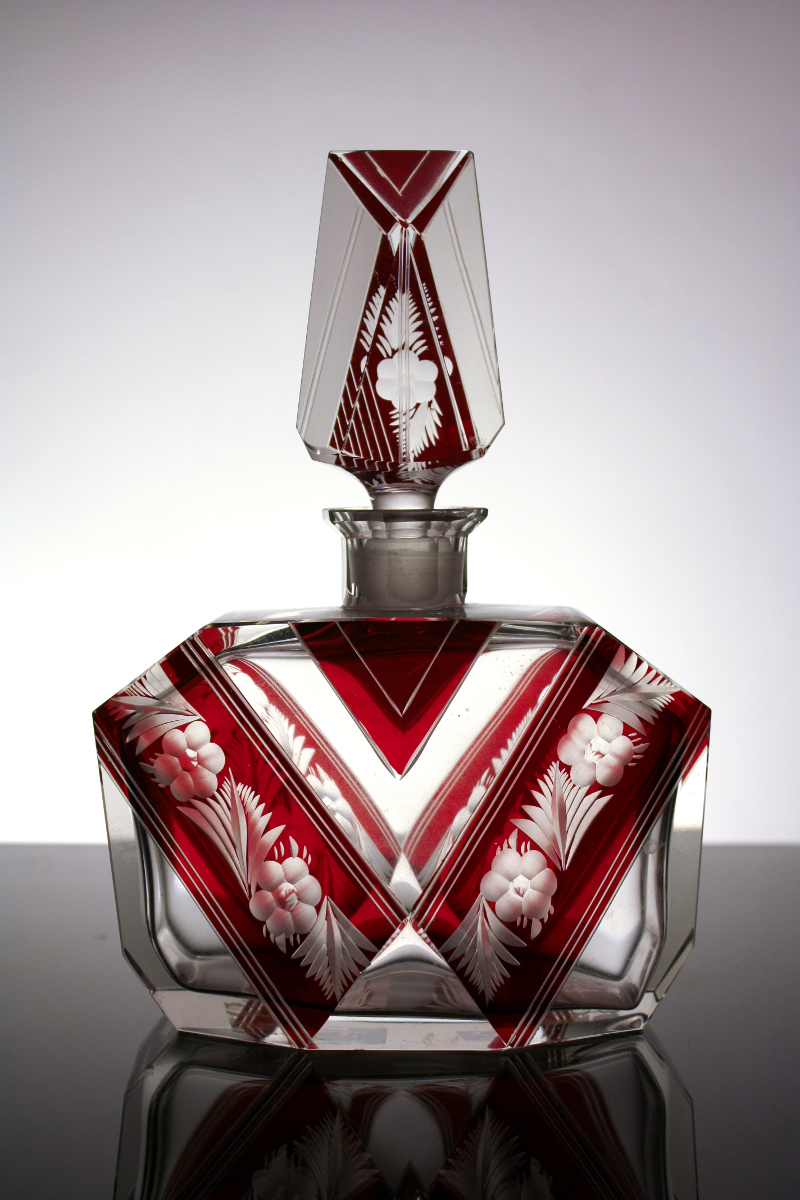
Art Deco decanter

Rondocubism also manifested itself in part in painting, for example by Josef Čapek, and in object design; for example, there are some complete room furnishings, by Bohumil Waigant and Josef Gočár.

== Applied arts ==
- Jindřich Halabala
- František Kysela
- Josef Salavec
- Václav Špála

== See also ==
- Czech Cubism

== Literature and sources ==
- POCHE, Emanuel. Prahou krok za krokem. Praha: Orbis, 1958.
- LUKEŠ, Zdeněk; PANOCH, Pavel. Století moderní architektury v Pardubickém kraji. [Pardubice]: Helios, 2006. ISBN 80-85211-19-X.
- LUKEŠ, Zdeněk; PANOCH, Pavel. Ve víru modernosti. [Pardubice]: Helios, 2008. ISBN 80-85211-23-8.
- LUKEŠ, Zdeněk, et al. Český architektonický kubismus : podivuhodný směr, který se zrodil v Praze. Praha: Galerie Jaroslava Fragnera, 2006. ISBN 80-239-8368-7.
- SELLNEROVÁ, Alena; HANZLÍK, Jan; PAVLÍKOVÁ, Marta. Architektura Podmokel 1900 – 1945 : NPÚ, ÚOP v Ústí nad Labem, 2014. ISBN 978-80-85036-55-8
