= Malyi Galagov =

Neighborhood in Uzhhorod, Ukraine

Coordinates: 48°37′32″N 22°17′19″E

Malyi Galagov (Ukrainian: Малий Ґалаґов, Малий Галагов; Czech: Malé Galago) is a neighborhood in Uzhhorod, Ukraine. It is located to the west of the historic centre of the city. It functions as a government and residential quarter.

== Etymology ==
Malyi means small or minor in Ukrainian. The word Galagov originates from Italian lago (lake), as the territory was periodically flooded by the Uzh River and resembled a lake. The Italian origins of the name are tied to the rule of the Drugeths in 14th–16th centuries.

== History ==
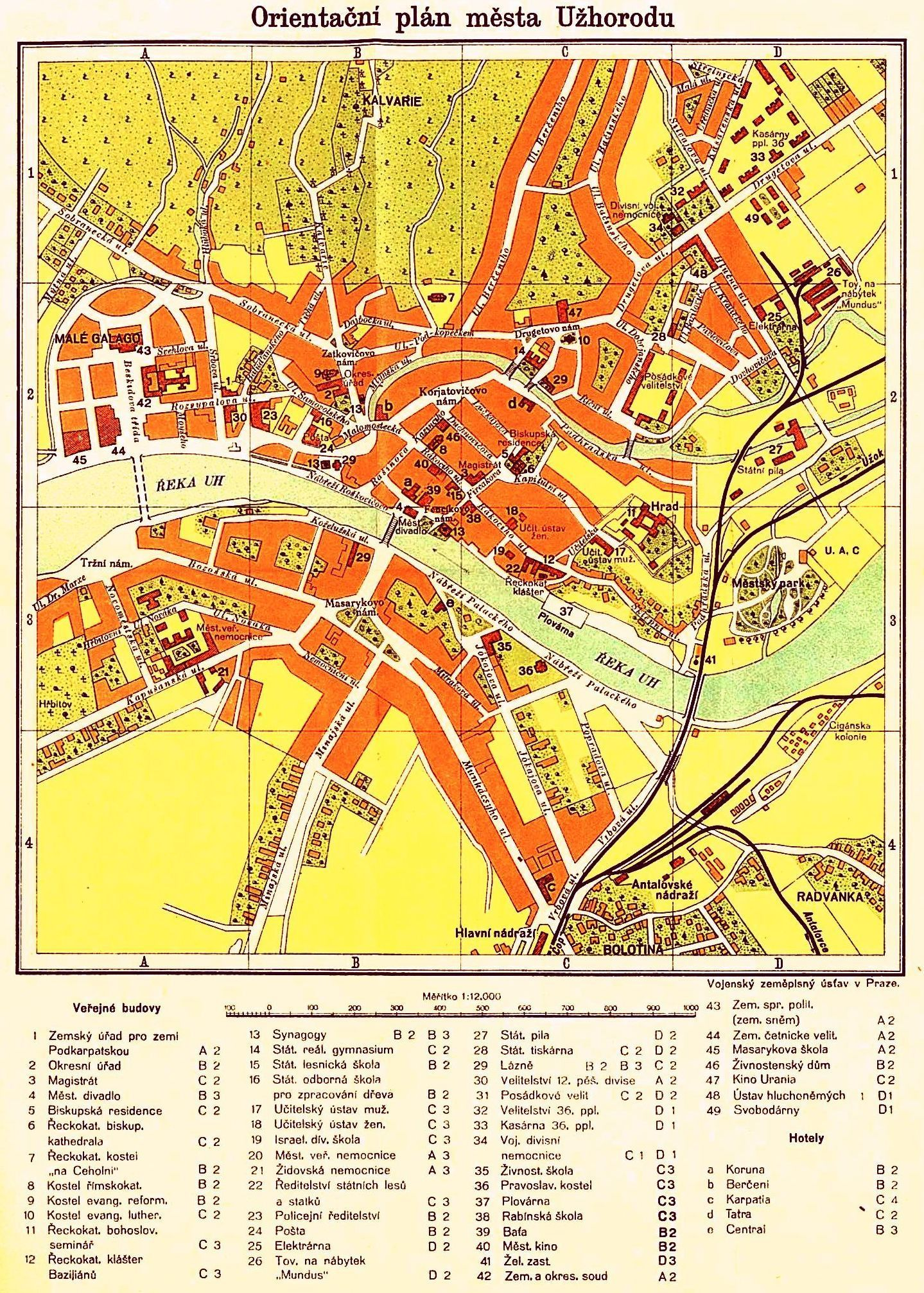
Plan of Uzhhorod under Czechoslovakia. Malyi Galagov is labeled in Czech.

As a part of the Treaty of Trianon of 1920, Zakarpattia became a part of the Czechoslovak Republic. Uzhhorod, being the new capital of the Subcarpathian Ruthenia Land, was in need of a government quarter. According to the project by Adolf Liebscher Jr., the Galagov marsh was reclaimed, and the construction of the new neighborhood began in 1923. Thus, the historic centre located nearby has remained preserved. The construction and expansion of Malyi Galagov stopped in 1938, when Zakarpattia became a part of Hungary as per the First Vienna Award. A lot of the government buildings retain their functions to this day.

== Architecture ==
Malyi Galagov forms a unique ensemble of interwar modernist buildings in Ukraine as it was built from scratch. The neighborhood displays all types of modernist styles that were predominant in interwar Czechoslovakia, including modern classicism, rondocubism, art deco, and functionalism. The government buildings alternate with the residential buildings. The architects of the buildings include Josef Gočár, František Krupka, Adolf Liebscher Jr., Bohumil Sláma, Alois Dryák, František Sander, and Petr Kropáček.

The area is especially known for sakura trees that grow on the streets, making it a popular photo zone in spring.

== Preservation ==
The entire neighborhood is under a contiguous historic zone with the historic centre. But, most of the buildings are not protected by the government, and the locals generally do not understand the significance of the neighborhood's architecture. Despite this, attempts have been made to inscribe Malyi Galagov on the tentative World Heritage Site list.

== Gallery ==
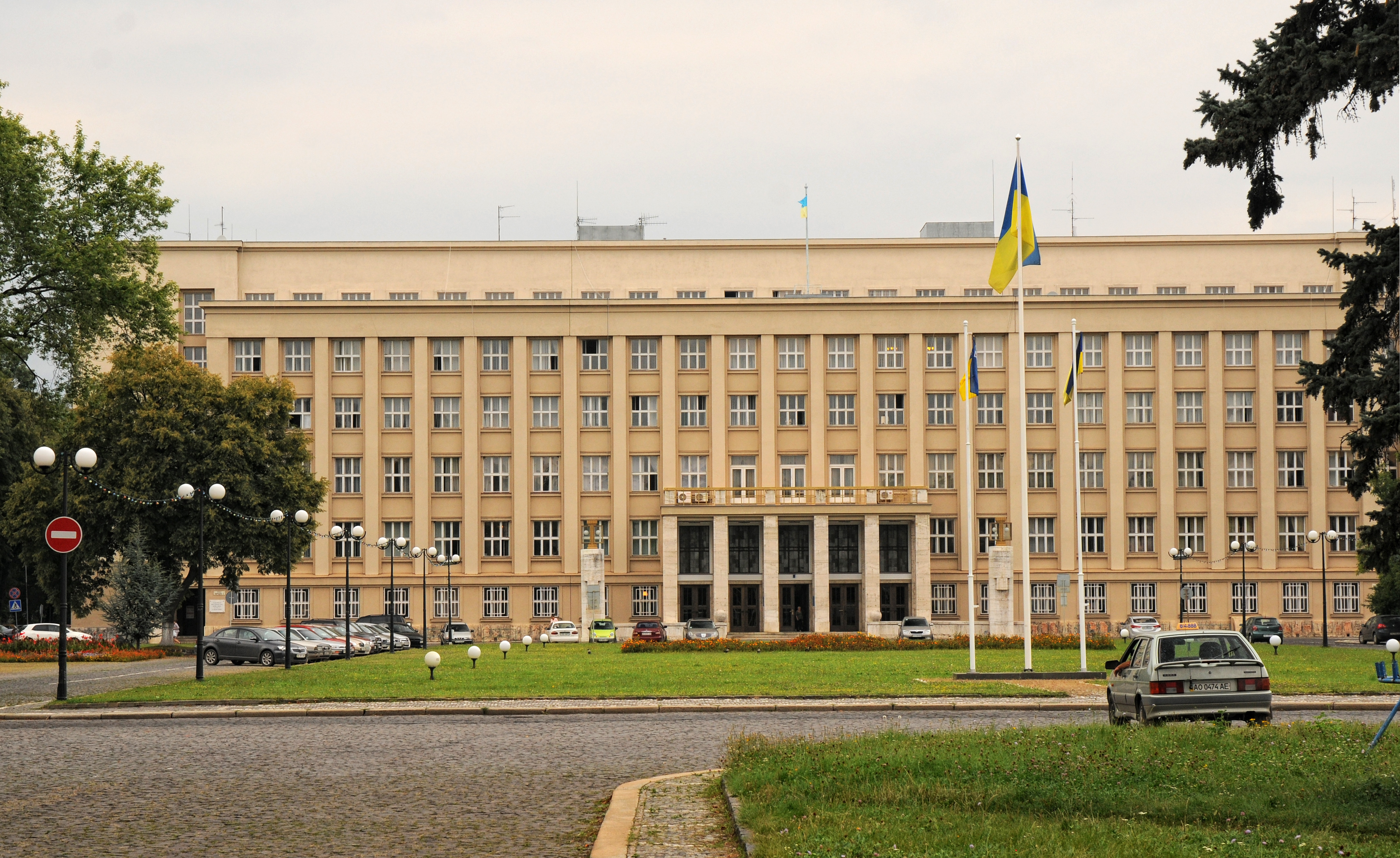
Zakarpattia Oblast Administration building

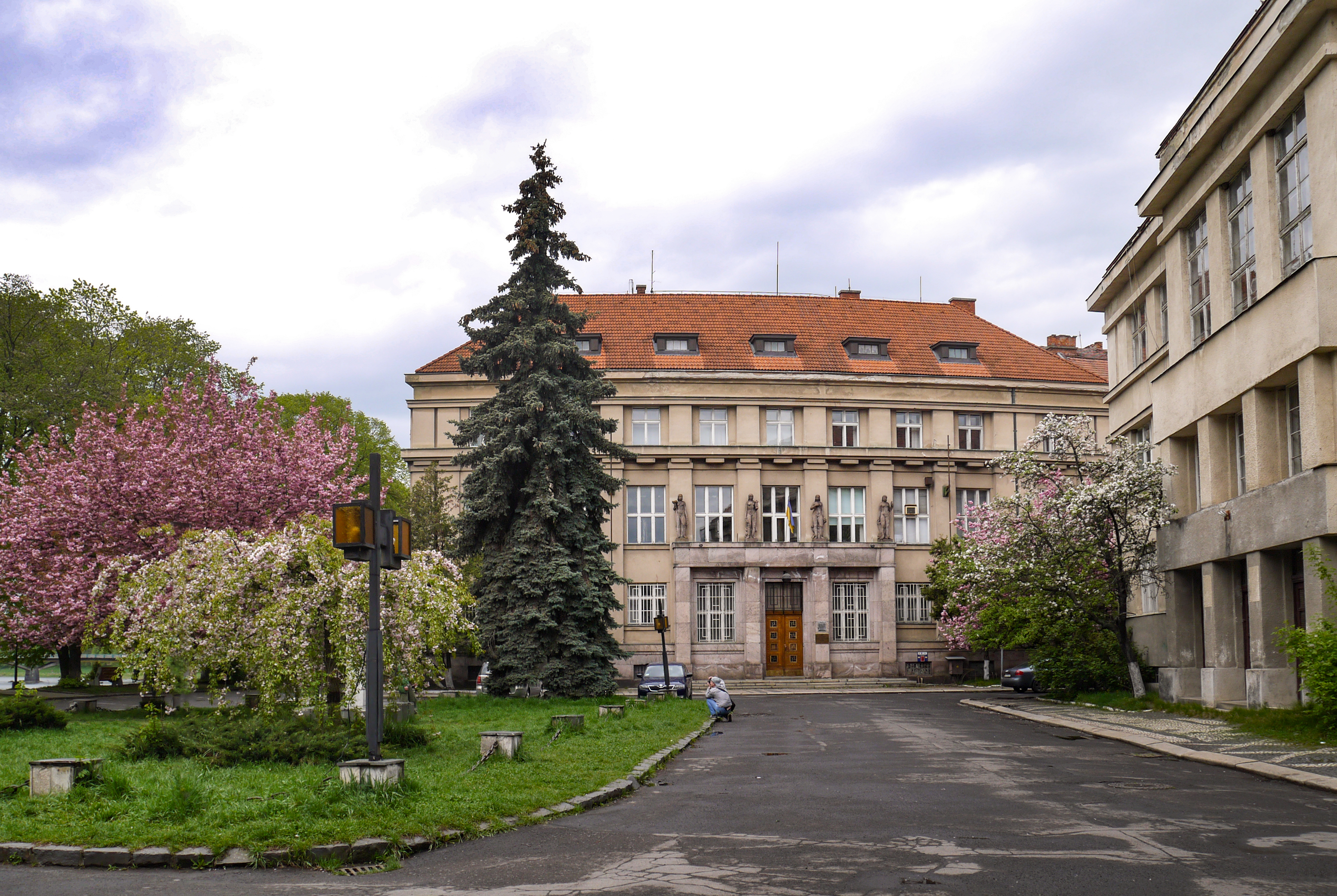
Bank

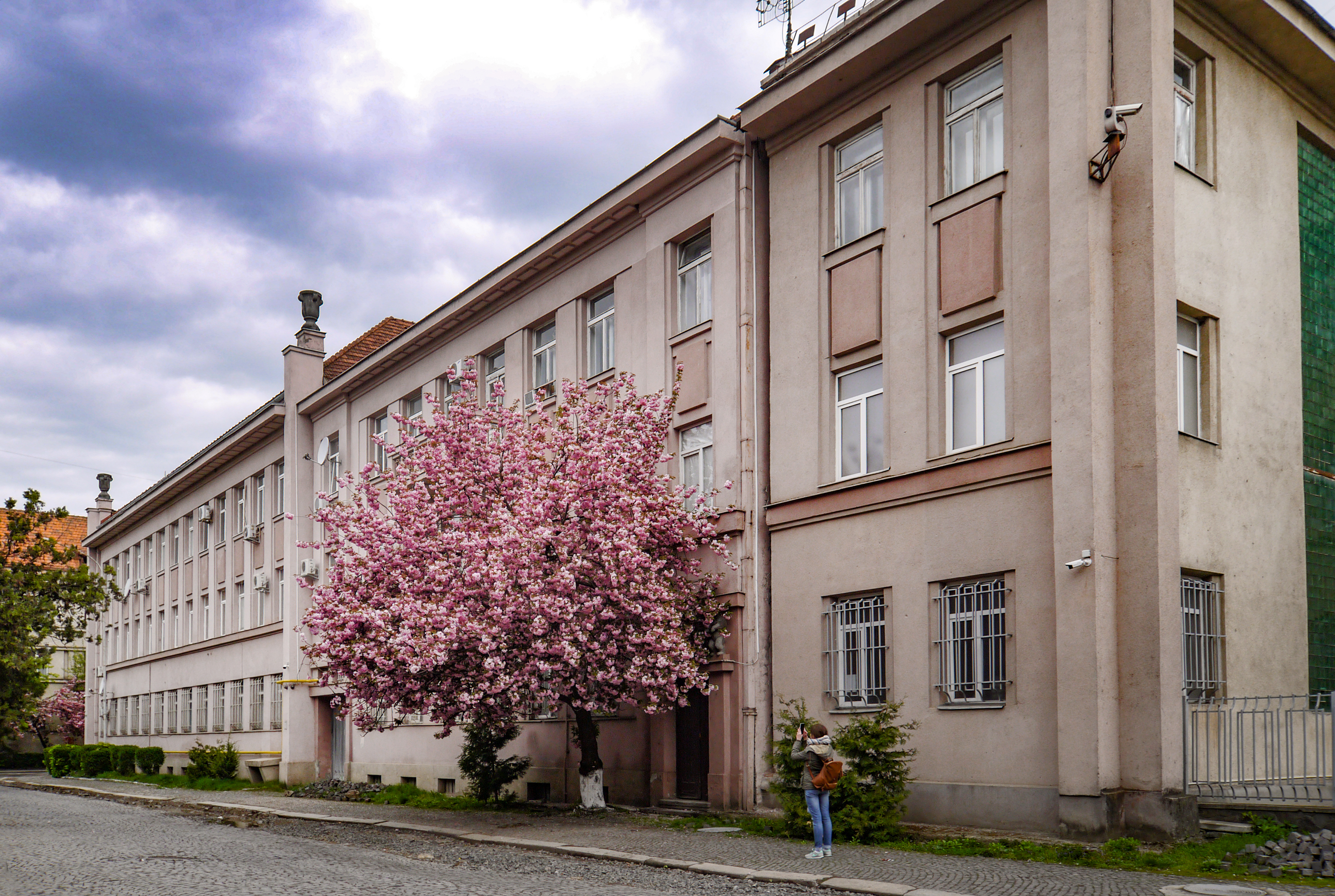
Former building of police administration

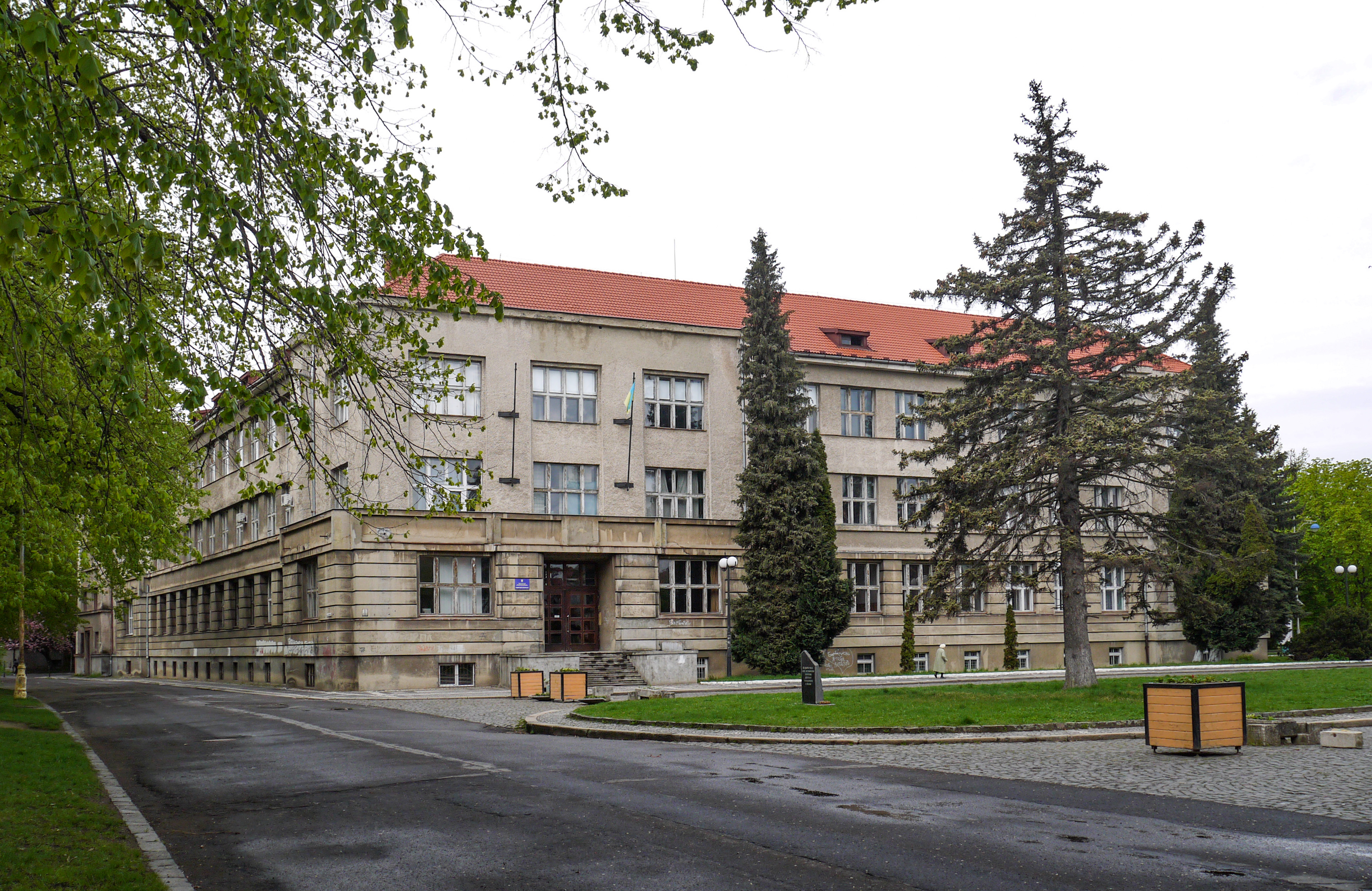
Former gendarmerie building

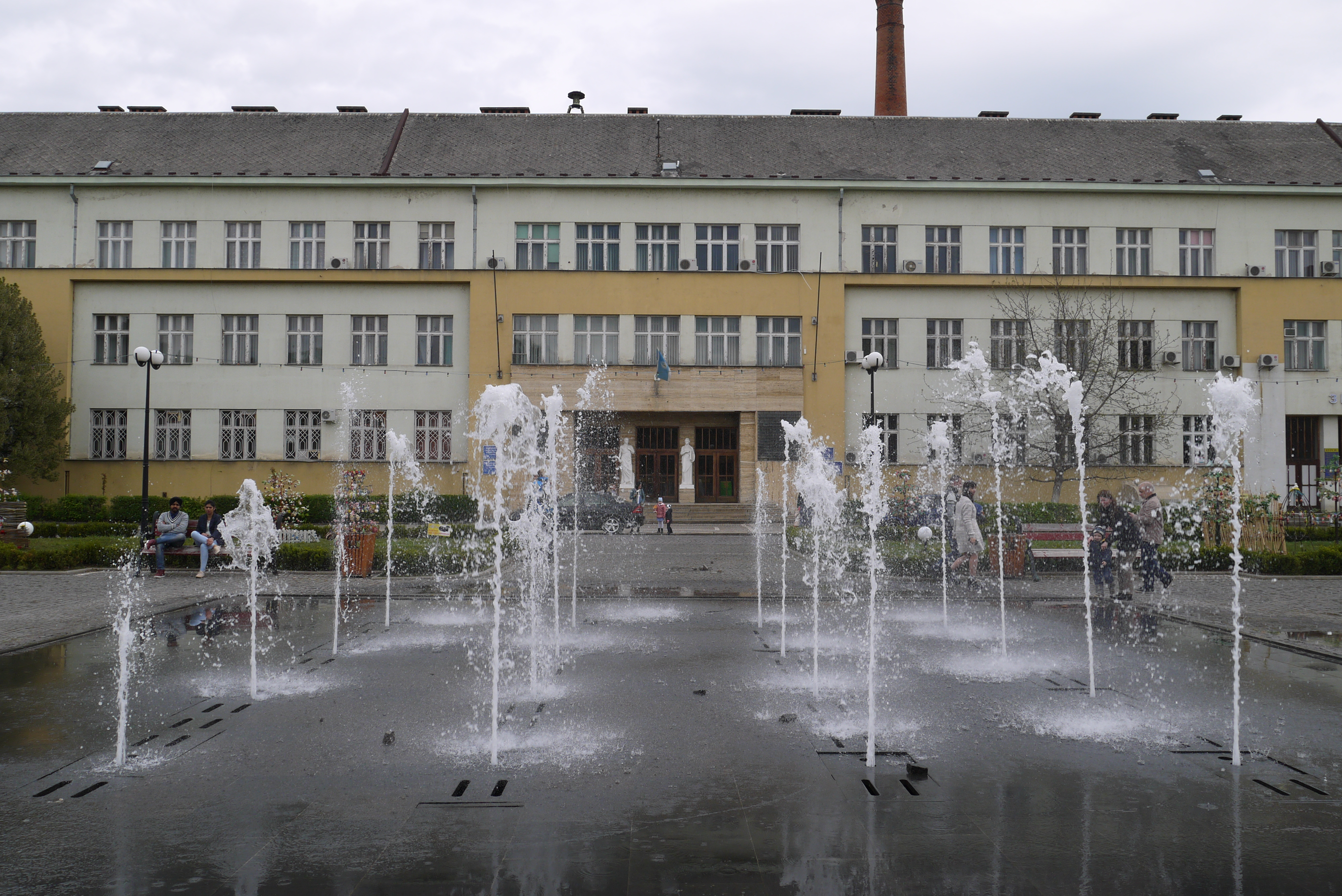
Former court house

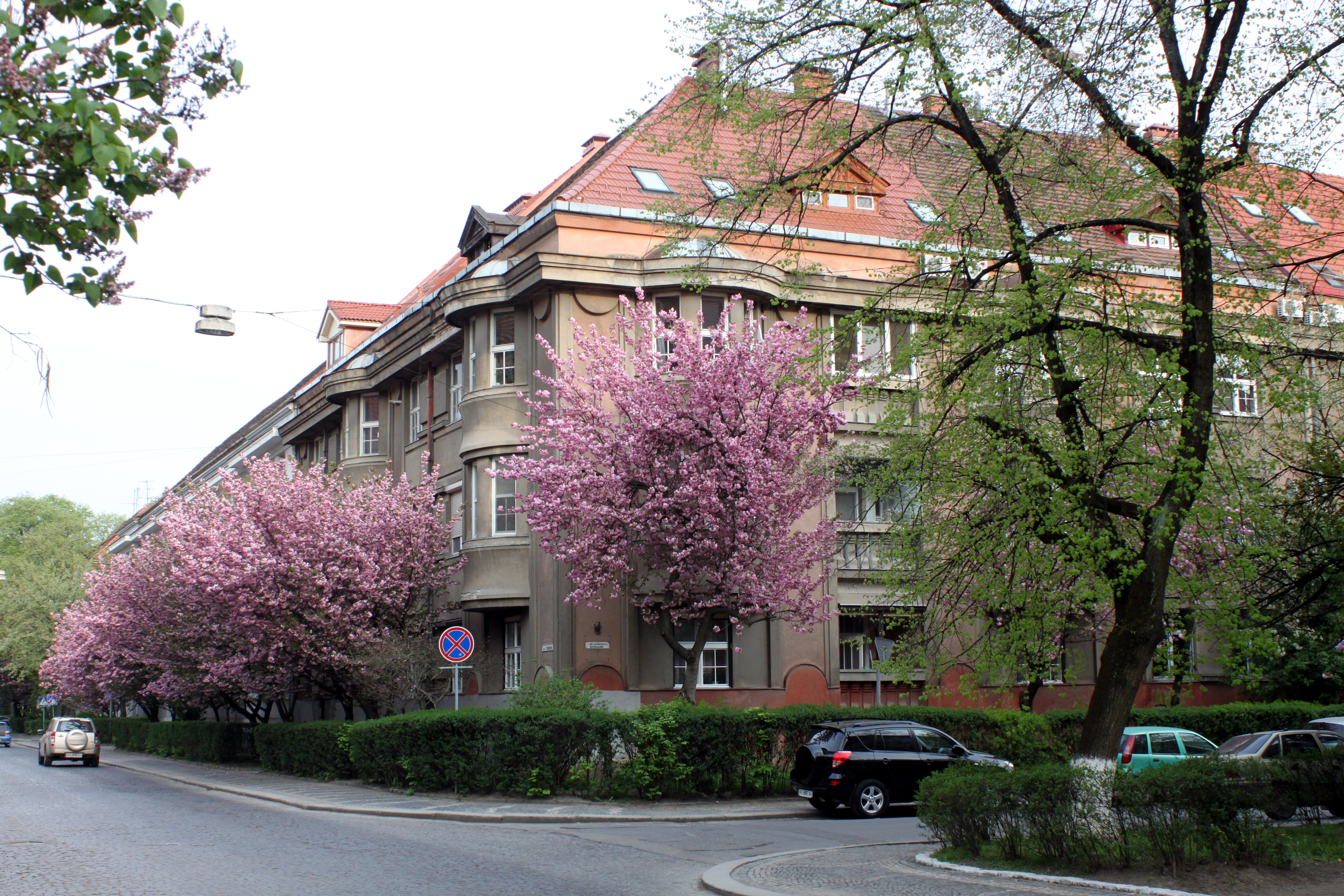
Residential building at Nezalezhnosti embankment, 17

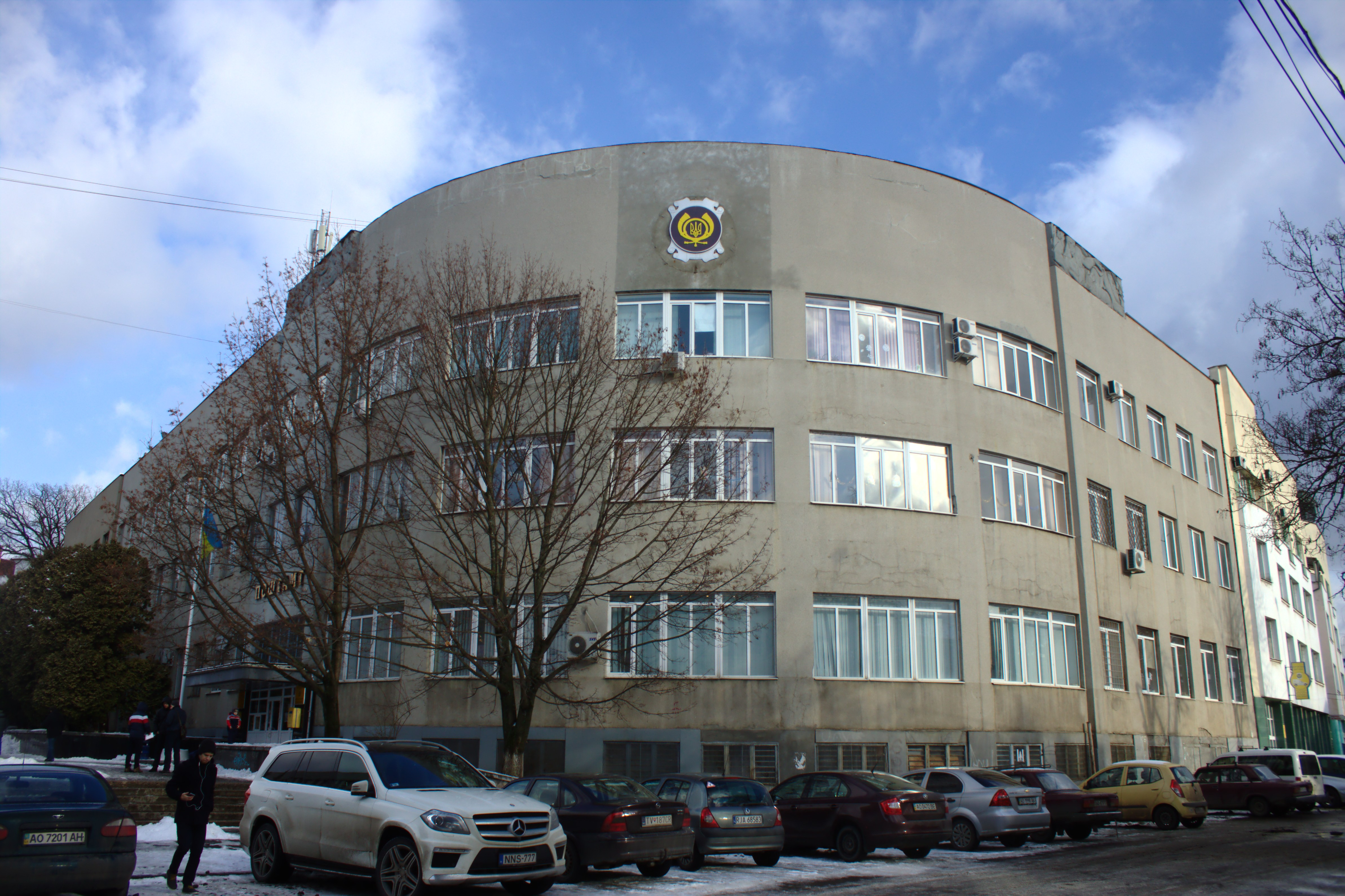
Main post office

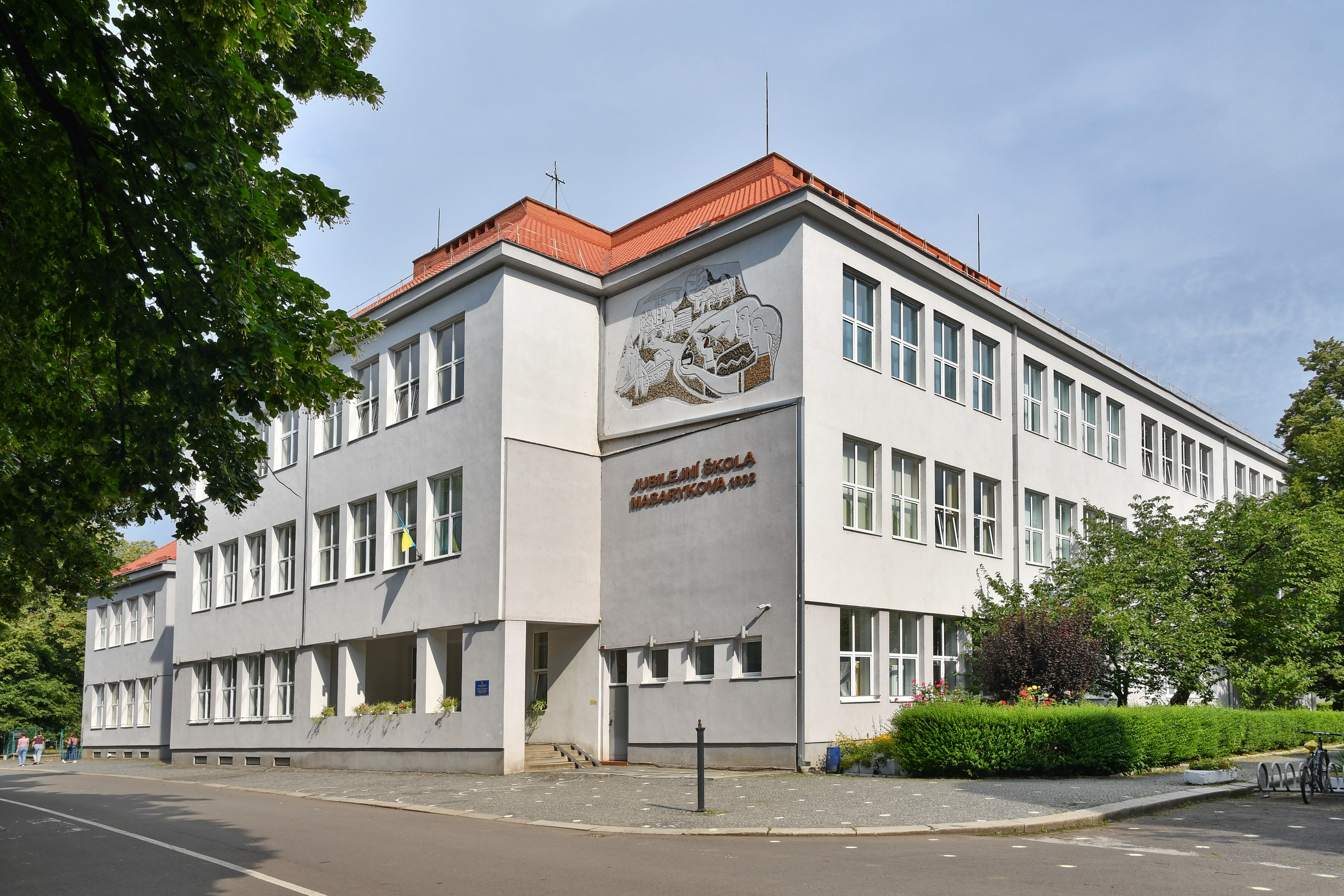
Masaryk school

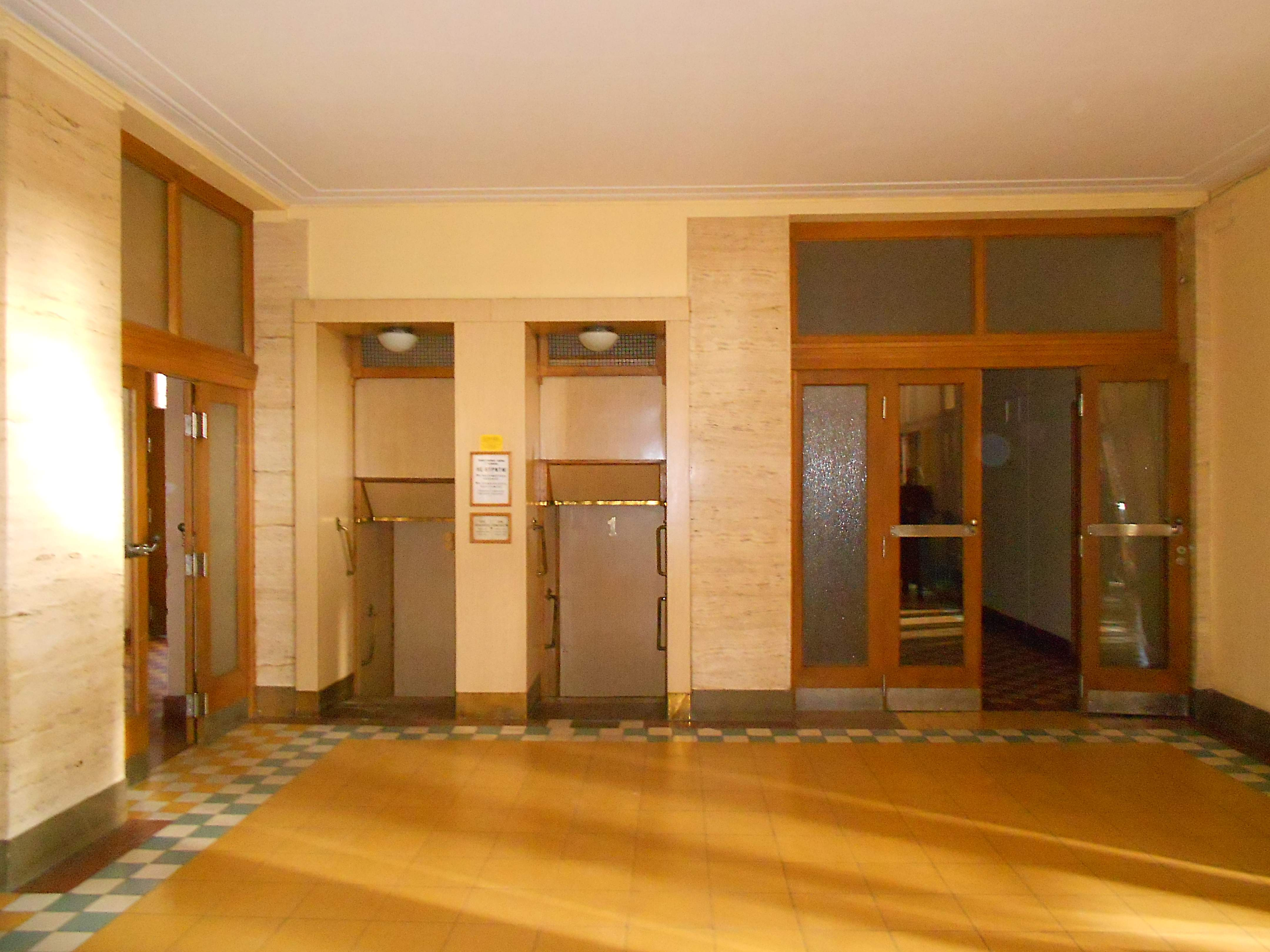
Paternoster lift in Zakarpattia Oblast Administration building

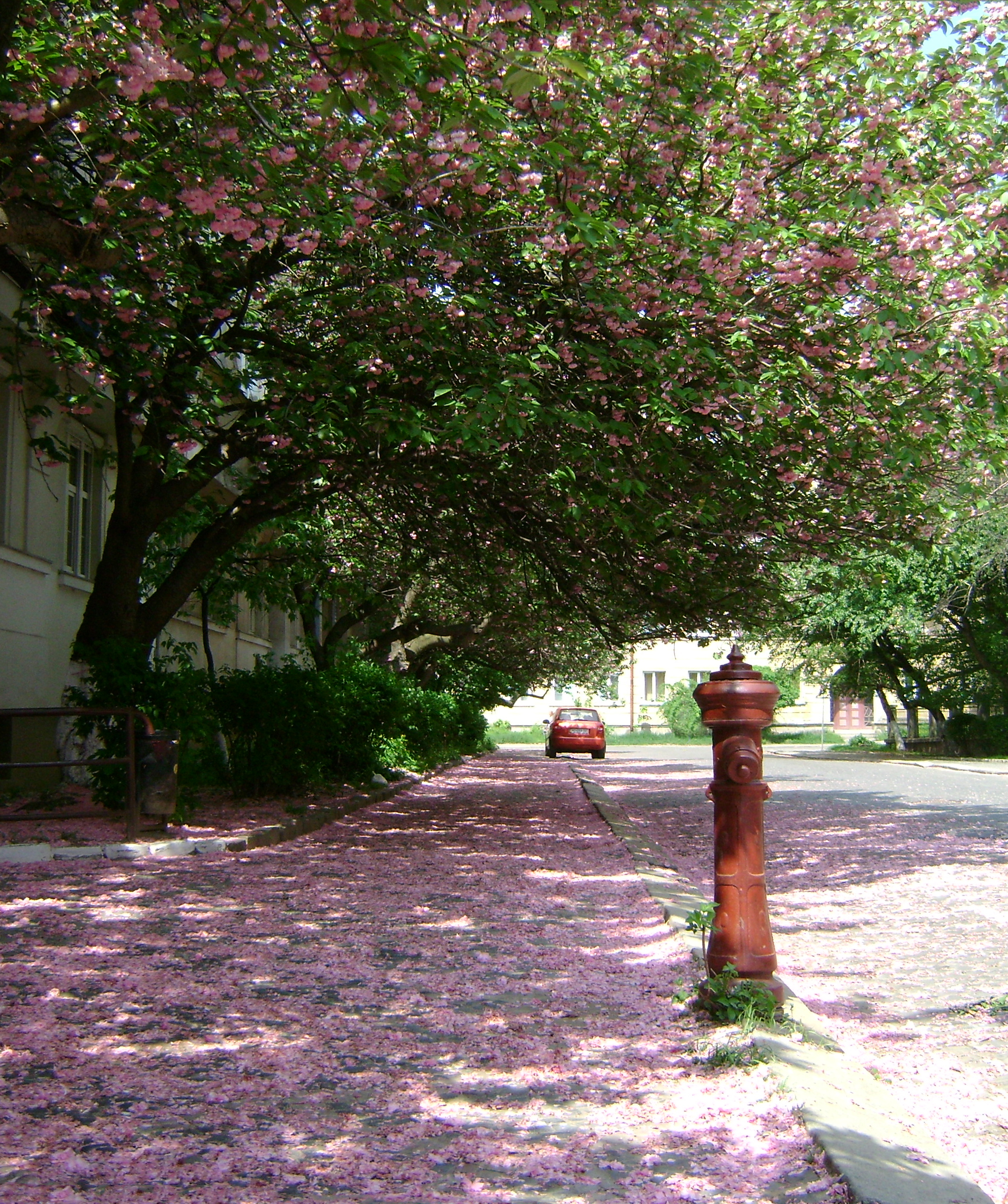
Sakura trees
