= Stadion Arnošta Košťála =

Football stadium in Pardubice, Czech Republic

- Letní stadion (Summer stadium)
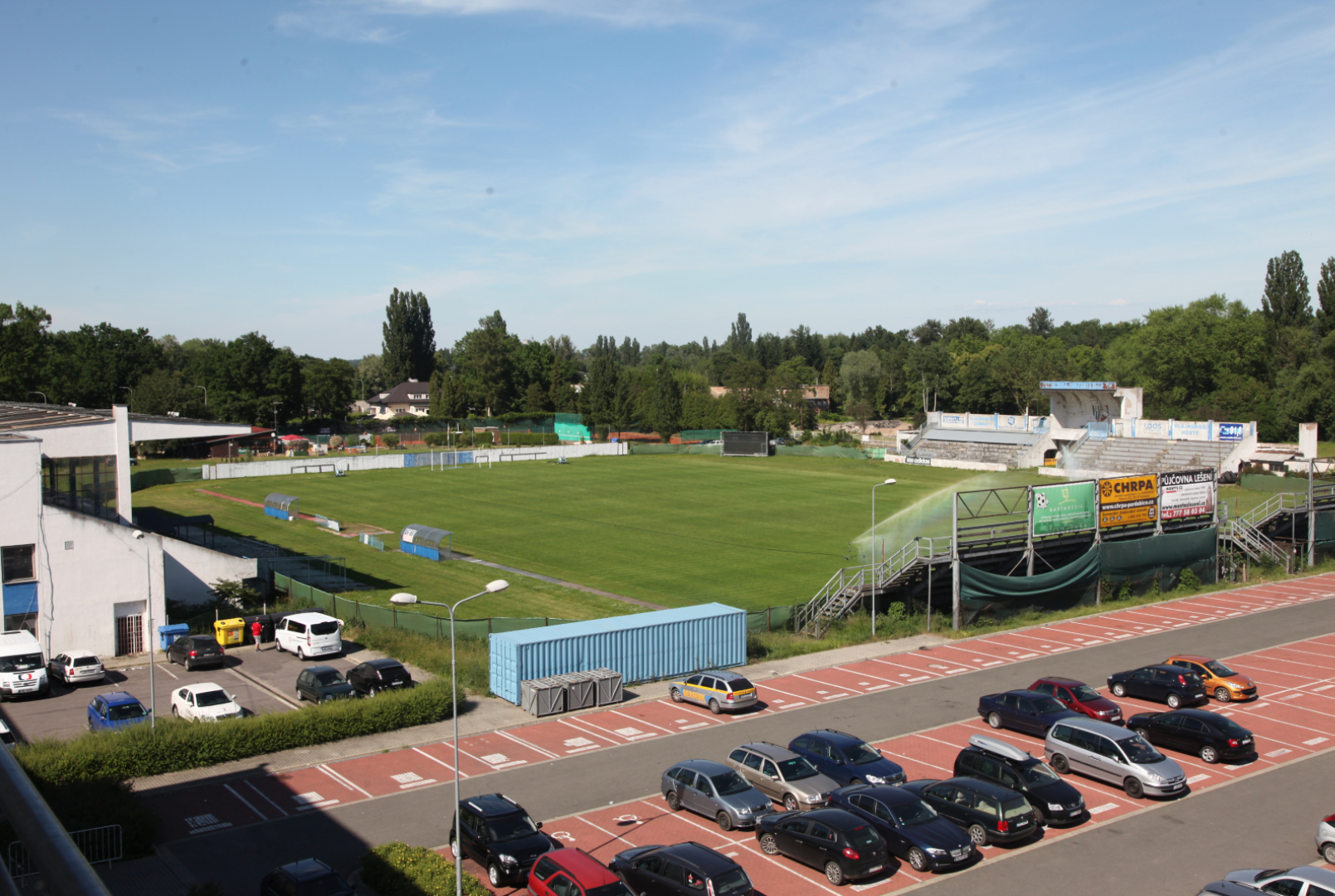
- Interactive map of Stadion Arnošta Košťála
- Former names: CFIG Arena (2023–2025); Masarykův všesportovní stadion (1931–1948); Gottwaldův stadion (1948)
- Location: U Stadionu 1652; Pardubice, Czech Republic, 530 02
- Coordinates: 50°2′28″N 15°46′16″E
- Owner: Pardubice
- Capacity: 4,620
- Surface: Grass
- Field size: 105x70 m

Construction
- Opened: 31 May 1931
- Renovated: 1968, 2023
- Architects: Karel Řepa, Ferdinand Potůček

Tenant
- FK Pardubice

Stadion Arnošta Košťála (Arnošt Košťál Stadium) is a football stadium in Pardubice, Czech Republic. It is the home stadium of FK Pardubice. It has a capacity of 4,620 seats.

== History ==
The stadium was built in 1930–1931. In May 1931 stadium was opened by the first Czechoslovak president Tomáš Garrigue Masaryk. Formerly known as Letní stadion, it was a multi-purpose stadium until 1968, then it served only for football and American football. Stadium capacity from the original 15,000 spectators dropped to just 1,000 spectators.

== Present ==
In 2021–2023, the stadium was completely reconstructed to meet the criteria for the Czech First League. The stadium was formally renamed between years 2023–2025 to CFIG Arena for sponsorship reasons, but officially it is called Arnošt Košťál Stadium.

The first match to take place at the stadium was the Czech First League match on 4 January 2023, with Pardubice hosting Slavia Prague. The visitors won 2–0.
