= Karel Řepa =

Czechoslovak architect (1895–1963)

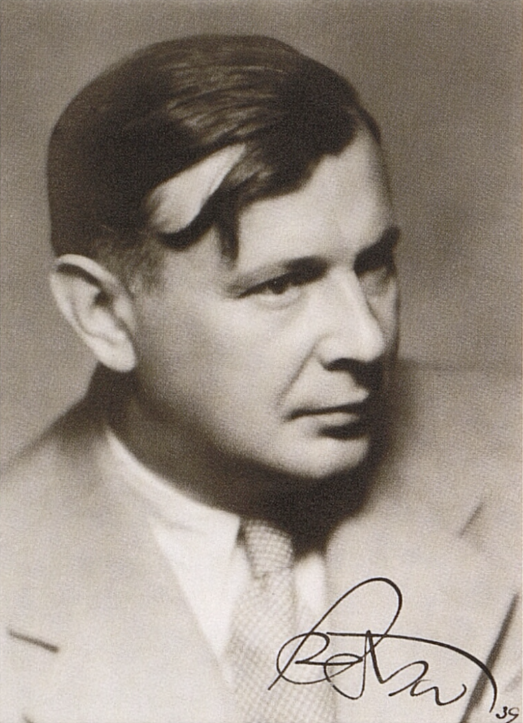
- Karel Řepa in 1939)
- Born: 23 October 1895; Nový Ples, Hradec Králové Region, Austria-Hungary
- Died: 2 March 1963 (aged 67); Pardubice, Czechoslovakia
- Occupation: Architect

Karel Řepa (23 October 1895 – 2 March 1963) was a Czechoslovak architect.

== Life and career ==
Born in Nový Ples, a pupil of Jože Plečnik, Řepa graduated from the Academy of Arts, Architecture and Design in Prague. A functionalist, after working in the Prague studio of František Krásný, in the mid-1920s he moved to Pardubice, where he realized his most important works, notably the Pardubice Railway Station, the Industrial Museum and the Masarykův football stadium.

Řepa died on 2 March 1963, at the age of 67. He was the father of architect Miroslav Řepa.
