= Brandýsek =

- Municipality
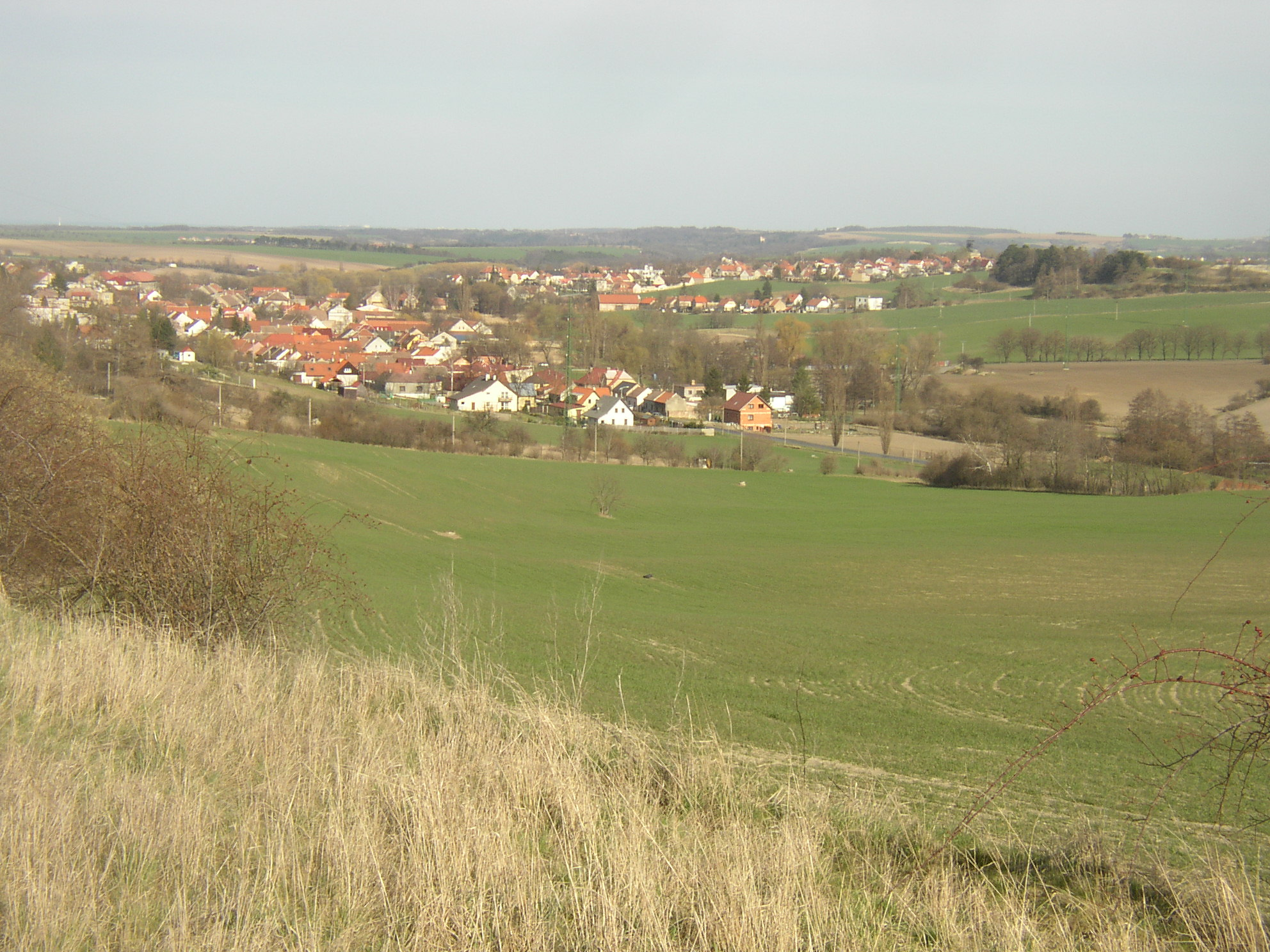
- View from the west

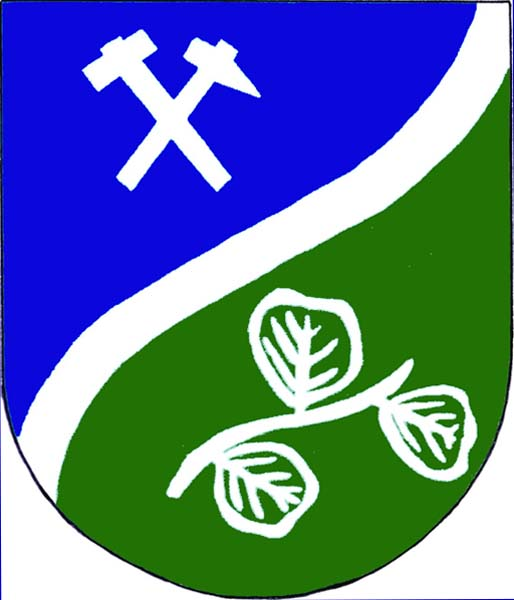
- Flag Coat of arms

- Location in the Czech Republic
- Coordinates: 50°11′22″N 14°9′43″E
- Country: Czech Republic
- Region: Central Bohemian
- District: Kladno
- First mentioned: 1345

Area
  - Total: 3.90 km^{2} (1.51 sq mi)
- Elevation: 285 m (935 ft)

Population (2026-01-01)
  - Total: 2,299
  - Density: 589/km^{2} (1,530/sq mi)
- Time zone: UTC+1 (CET)
  - Summer (DST): UTC+2 (CEST)
- Postal code: 273 41
- Website: www.brandysek.cz

Brandýsek is a municipality and village in Kladno District in the Central Bohemian Region of the Czech Republic. It has about 2,300 inhabitants.

== Administrative division ==
Brandýsek consists of two municipal parts (in brackets population according to the 2021 census):

- Brandýsek (1,427)
- Olšany (717)

== Etymology ==
The initial name of Brandýsek was Brandýs, but because the settlement was smaller than other places called Brandýs in the country, the name was changed to the diminutive form in the 19th century. According to one theory, the name Brandýs was derived from branný hrad (meaning 'defensive castle'). According to another theory, the name was derived from the personal name Brant.

== Geography ==
Brandýsek is located about 6 kilometres (4 mi) northeast of Kladno and 17 km (11 mi) northwest of Prague. It lies in an agricultural landscape in the Prague Plateau.

== History ==
The first trustworthy written mention of Brandýsek is from 1345, although there is also a mention in Wenceslaus Hajek's chronicle relating to the year 976. Olšany was first mentioned in 1316.

== Demographics ==
Historical population

| Year | Pop. | ±% |
|---|---|---|
| 1869 | 1,382 | — |
| 1880 | 1,425 | +3.1% |
| 1890 | 1,676 | +17.6% |
| 1900 | 1,753 | +4.6% |
| 1910 | 2,552 | +45.6% |

| Year | Pop. | ±% |
|---|---|---|
| 1921 | 2,558 | +0.2% |
| 1930 | 2,630 | +2.8% |
| 1950 | 2,031 | −22.8% |
| 1961 | 2,089 | +2.9% |
| 1970 | 1,918 | −8.2% |

| Year | Pop. | ±% |
|---|---|---|
| 1980 | 1,696 | −11.6% |
| 1991 | 1,531 | −9.7% |
| 2001 | 1,627 | +6.3% |
| 2011 | 1,830 | +12.5% |
| 2021 | 2,144 | +17.2% |

Source: Censuses

== Transport ==
The D7 motorway from Prague to Chomutov runs through the municipality.

Brandýsek is located on the railway line Kladno–Kralupy nad Vltavou.

== Sights ==
The only cultural monument in the municipality is the mining tower in the former Michal coal mine from the second half of the 19th century.

== Notable people ==
- Alois Dryák (1872–1932), architect
