= Miroslav Řepa =

Czech architect (1930–2023)

- Born: 24 February 1930; Pardubice, Czechoslovakia
- Died: 7 June 2023 (aged 93); Prague, Czech Republic
- Education: ČVUT; AVU
- Occupation: architect

Miroslav Řepa (24 February 1930 – 7 June 2023) was a Czech architect.

== Life and career ==
Born in Pardubice, the son of the architect Karel Řepa, he earned a degree architecture from the ČVUT, and then graduated from the Prague Academy of Fine Arts. His first project was the Zlín City Theatre. Among his major works, there were the restoration of the East Bohemian Theatre in Pardubice, and the renovation of the Prague National Theatre. He designed the Czechoslovak pavilions for the Montreal Expo 67 (with architect Vladimír Pýcha) and the Osaka Expo '70, and served as technical director at the Seville Expo '92.

Řepa died on 7 June 2023, at the age of 93.
