= Alois Dryák =

Czech architect

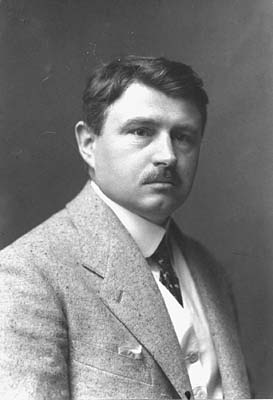
Alois Dryák

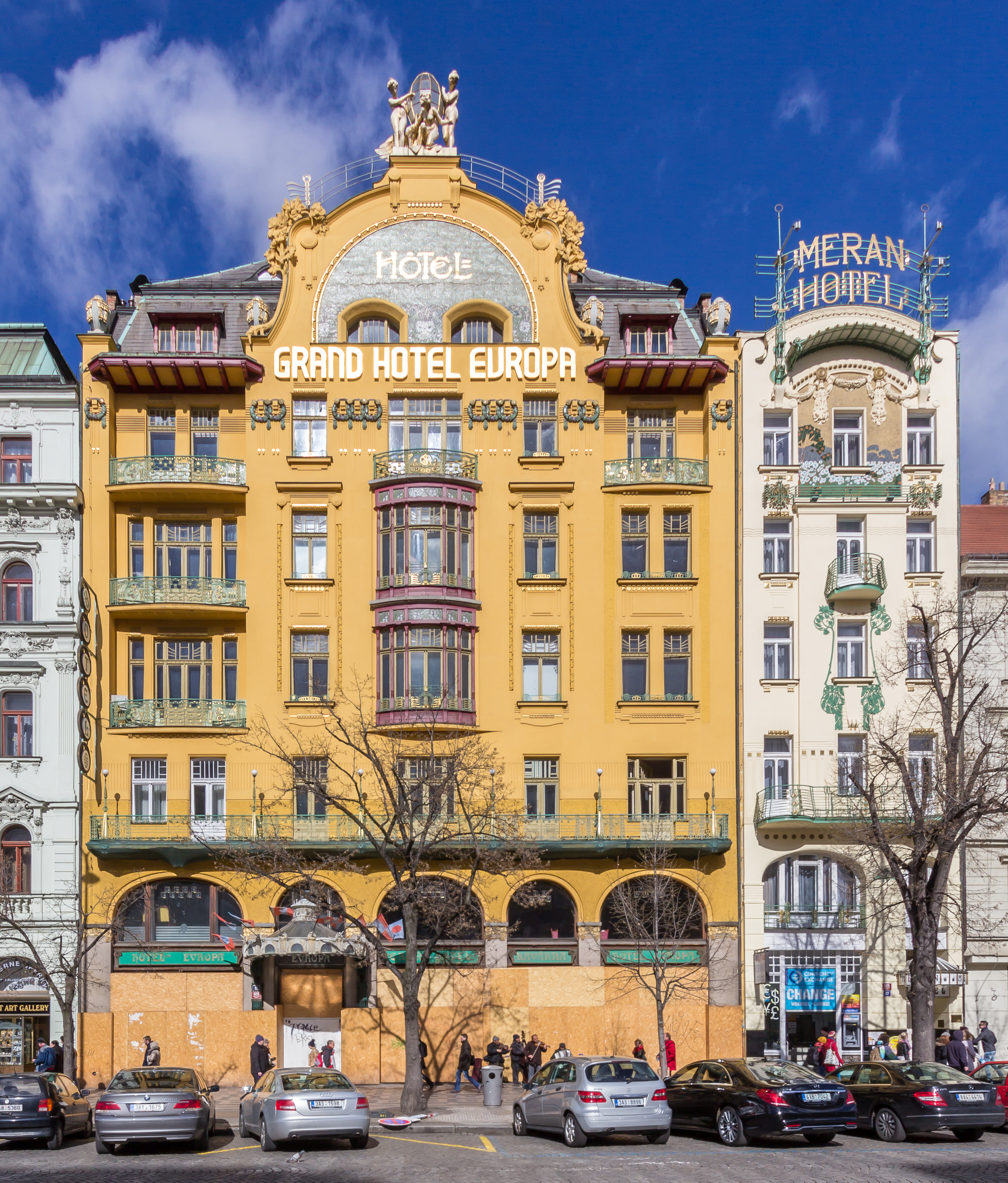
Hotel Evropa, Prague, Wenceslas Square

Alois Dryák (24 February 1872 in Olšany – 6 June 1932 in Prague) was a Czech architect and professor of ornamental design.

Dryák is most famous for Art Nouveau masterpieces, especially the 1905 re-design of the Hotel Europa (also known as Hotel Evropa, formerly Hotel Šroubek) in Prague, Czech Republic, done with fellow architect Bedřich Bendelmeier and architectural sculptor Ladislav Šaloun.

The Europa and another Dryák commission, the Hotel Garni, are both located on Wenceslas Square, which is dominated by an equestrian statue of Saint Wenceslas. Dryak designed the ornate pedestal of this statue.

In the 1920s he adopted new styles and secured important commissions, such as the Radio Palace in Prague, built 1920-22 in the style of Rondocubism, and the Faculty of Law, Masaryk University, Brno, built 1928-32 in Classicist style.

His work was part of the architecture event in the art competition at the 1932 Summer Olympics.

== Other people named Alois Dryák ==
Alois Vaclav Dryak - the nephew and namesake of Alois Dryák, the architect.
