= Nový Ples =

- Municipality
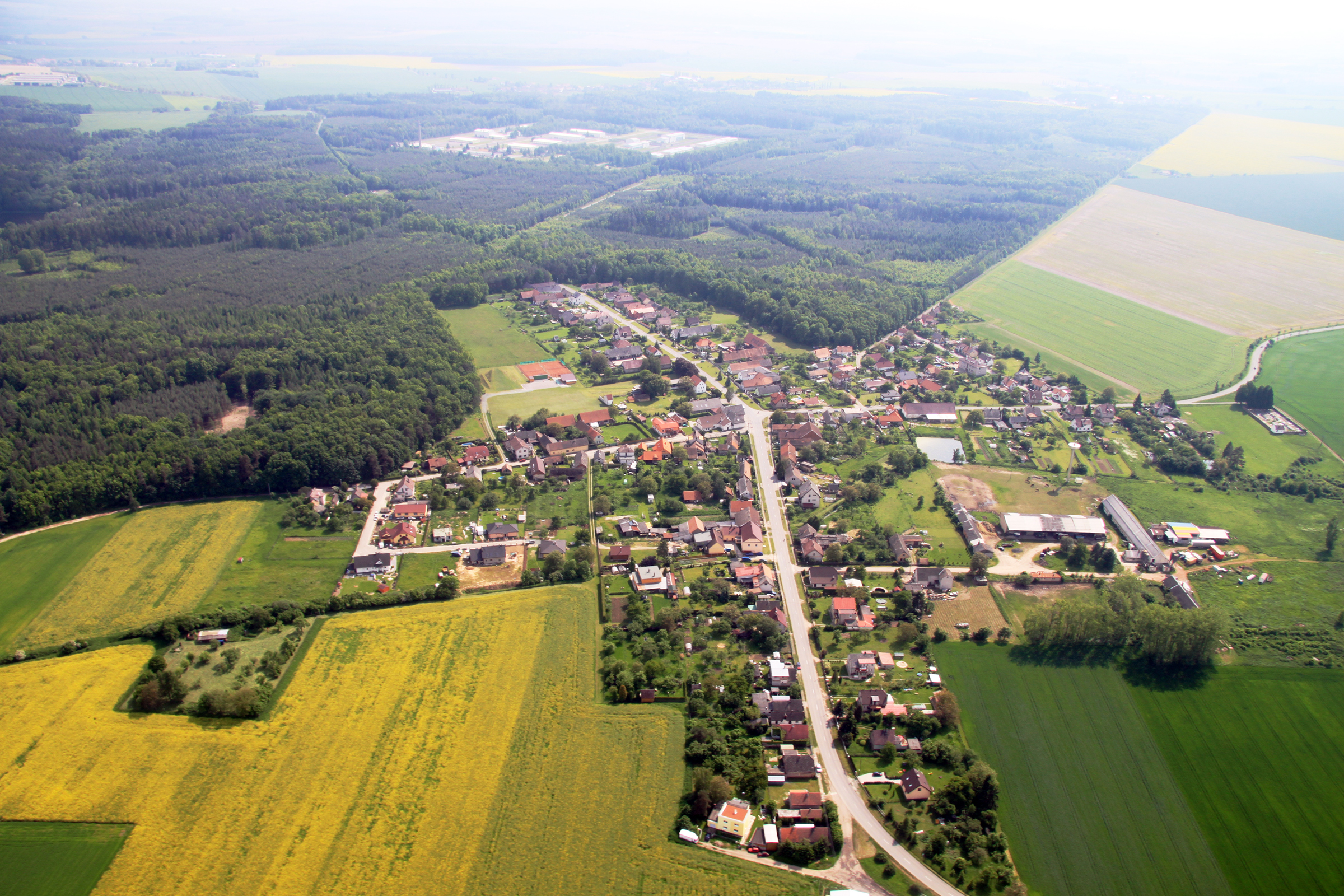
- Aerial view

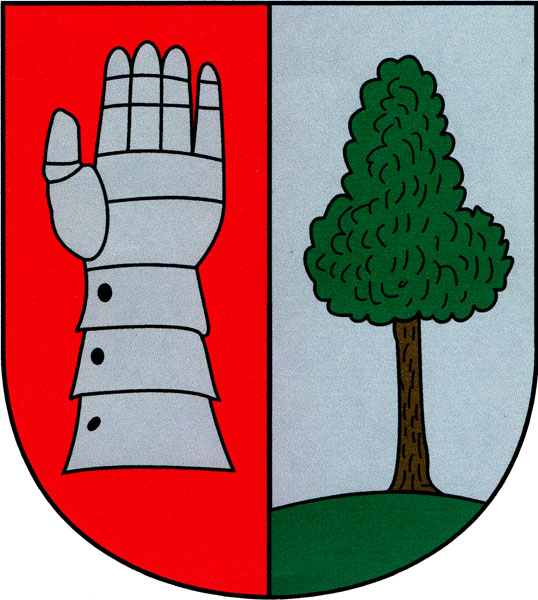
- Coat of arms

- Location in the Czech Republic
- Coordinates: 50°19′16″N 15°56′57″E
- Country: Czech Republic
- Region: Hradec Králové
- District: Náchod
- Founded: 1836

Area
  - Total: 7.12 km^{2} (2.75 sq mi)
- Elevation: 269 m (883 ft)

Population (2026-01-01)
  - Total: 357
  - Density: 50.1/km^{2} (130/sq mi)
- Time zone: UTC+1 (CET)
  - Summer (DST): UTC+2 (CEST)
- Postal code: 551 01
- Website: www.novy-ples.cz

Nový Ples (German: Neu Ples) is a municipality and village in Náchod District in the Hradec Králové Region of the Czech Republic. It has about 400 inhabitants.

== Demographics ==
Historical population
Year	Pop.	±%
1869	457	—
1880	565	+23.6%
1890	550	−2.7%
1900	488	−11.3%
1910	497	+1.8%
1921	450	−9.5%
1930	435	−3.3%
1950	361	−17.0%
1961	350	−3.0%
1970	309	−11.7%
1980	320	+3.6%
1991	287	−10.3%
2001	285	−0.7%
2011	342	+20.0%
2021	337	−1.5%
Source: Censuses
