= Újezd u Chocně =

- Municipality
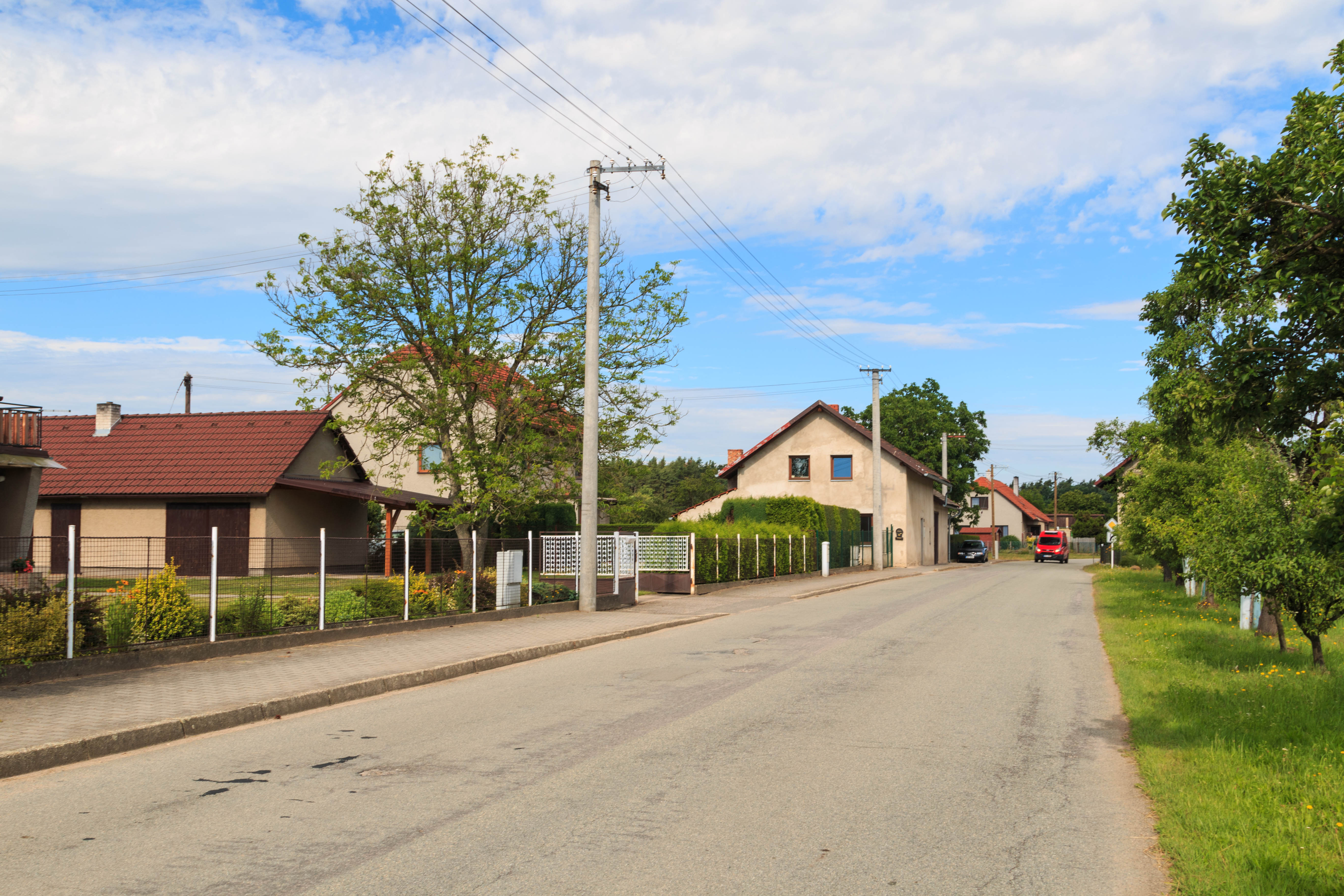
- Main street

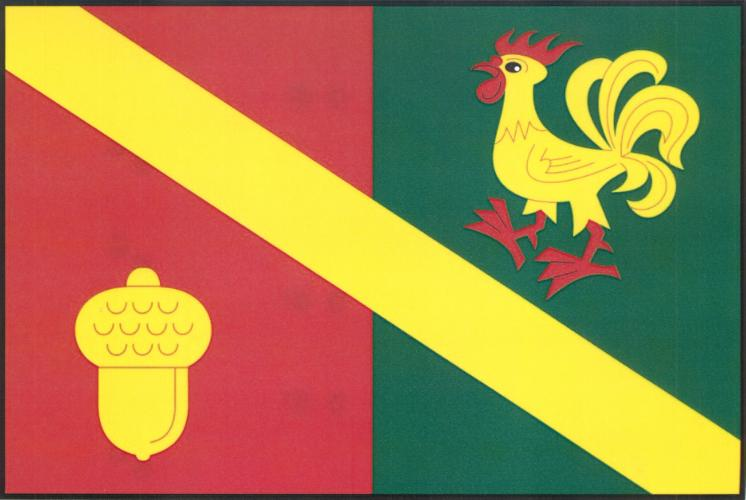
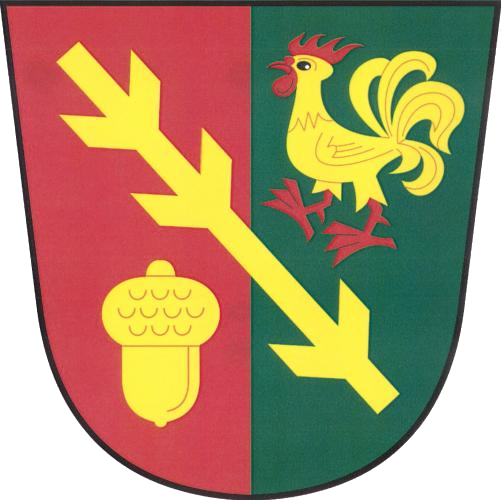
- Flag Coat of arms

- Location in the Czech Republic
- Coordinates: 50°1′37″N 16°9′53″E
- Country: Czech Republic
- Region: Pardubice
- District: Ústí nad Orlicí
- First mentioned: 1342

Area
  - Total: 16.36 km^{2} (6.32 sq mi)
- Elevation: 320 m (1,050 ft)

Population (2026-01-01)
  - Total: 337
  - Density: 20.6/km^{2} (53.4/sq mi)
- Time zone: UTC+1 (CET)
  - Summer (DST): UTC+2 (CEST)
- Postal code: 565 01
- Website: www.ujezd-u-chocne.cz

Újezd u Chocně (German: Aujezd) is a municipality and village in Ústí nad Orlicí District in the Pardubice Region of the Czech Republic. It has about 300 inhabitants.

Újezd u Chocně lies approximately 18 kilometres (11 mi) west of Ústí nad Orlicí, 28 km (17 mi) east of Pardubice, and 125 km (78 mi) east of Prague.

== Administrative division ==
Újezd u Chocně consists of three municipal parts (in brackets population according to the 2021 census):

- Újezd u Chocně (181)
- Chloumek (110)
- Prochody (26)

== Demographics ==
Historical population
Year	Pop.	±%
1869	523	—
1880	588	+12.4%
1890	572	−2.7%
1900	567	−0.9%
1910	544	−4.1%
1921	506	−7.0%
1930	496	−2.0%
1950	426	−14.1%
1961	420	−1.4%
1970	358	−14.8%
1980	319	−10.9%
1991	305	−4.4%
2001	293	−3.9%
2011	322	+9.9%
2021	317	−1.6%
Source: Censuses
