= Anton Jüngling =

Austrian railway architect (1798–1885)

- Born: 14 March 1798; Vienna, Archduchy of Austria
- Died: 30 November 1885 (aged 87); Vienna, Austria-Hungary
- Occupation: Railway architect

Anton Jüngling (14 March 1798 – 30 November 1885) was an Austrian railway architect.

== Life ==
Jüngling graduated from the Polytechnic Institute in Vienna and the Academy of Fine Arts in Vienna under the architect Pietro Nobile. From 1822 to 1838, he worked as an accounting clerk, and in 1836 to 1842, he worked as a structural designer for the Emperor Ferdinand Northern Railway. Before leaving the civil service, he held both jobs and in 1837 applied to the SDCF to be accepted as a permanent architect. construction directorate, in the years 1852–1860 he worked in the Central Directorate for Railway Constructions and in the years 1860–1864 in the General Inspectorate of Austrian Railways.

He died on 30 November 1885.

== Work ==
On the recommendation of the building board Ermenegildo Francesconi, in 1838, Anton Jüngling received an assignment to draw up plans, budgets and terms of reference for station buildings on the Vienna–Brno line. Jüngling was so impressed by the work that he left his career as a civil servant and joined the SDCF as an architect in the position of assistant chief engineer. Until 1842, he mainly designed and managed the construction of dispatch buildings on the lines of the SDCF company Vienna–Břeclav–Brno, Břeclav–Přerov–Lipník nad Bečvou, Přerov–Olomouc, from 1842 on the lines of the Northern State Railway Olomouc–Prague, Brno–Česká Třebová and others (Prague–Děčín).

The first buildings that were not yet subject to typification were designed individually. Nevertheless, some forms were repeated in Jüngling's buildings, such as multi-story buildings with a high hip roof, and architectural elements (shallow avant-corps, attics, triangular gables). His work was also influenced by English architectural patterns, for example the free-standing platform shelters with gable roofs supported by wooden posts were inspired by the 1830 Crown Street through station in Liverpool.

From 1842, Jügling worked for the Northern State Railway. At that time, the stations were already divided according to importance into five classes, of which the most numerous was IV. class (waiting room, cash desk, two flats and water station). This division led Jüngling to create typified buildings, which were distinguished by small details, e.g. in the division of facades, the length of the wings (at waterworks).

=== List of buildings and works ===
- 1838 Nordbahnhof, Vienna, Classicist style, rebuilt 1859–1865, bombed 1945, demolished
- 1838 Rajhrad railway station, narrative building with a draw
- 1845 Česká Třebová railway station, demolished in the 1920s
- 1843–1949 chief engineer of the Brno–Česká Třebová line
- 1848 Adamov railway station
