= Sruby =

- Municipality
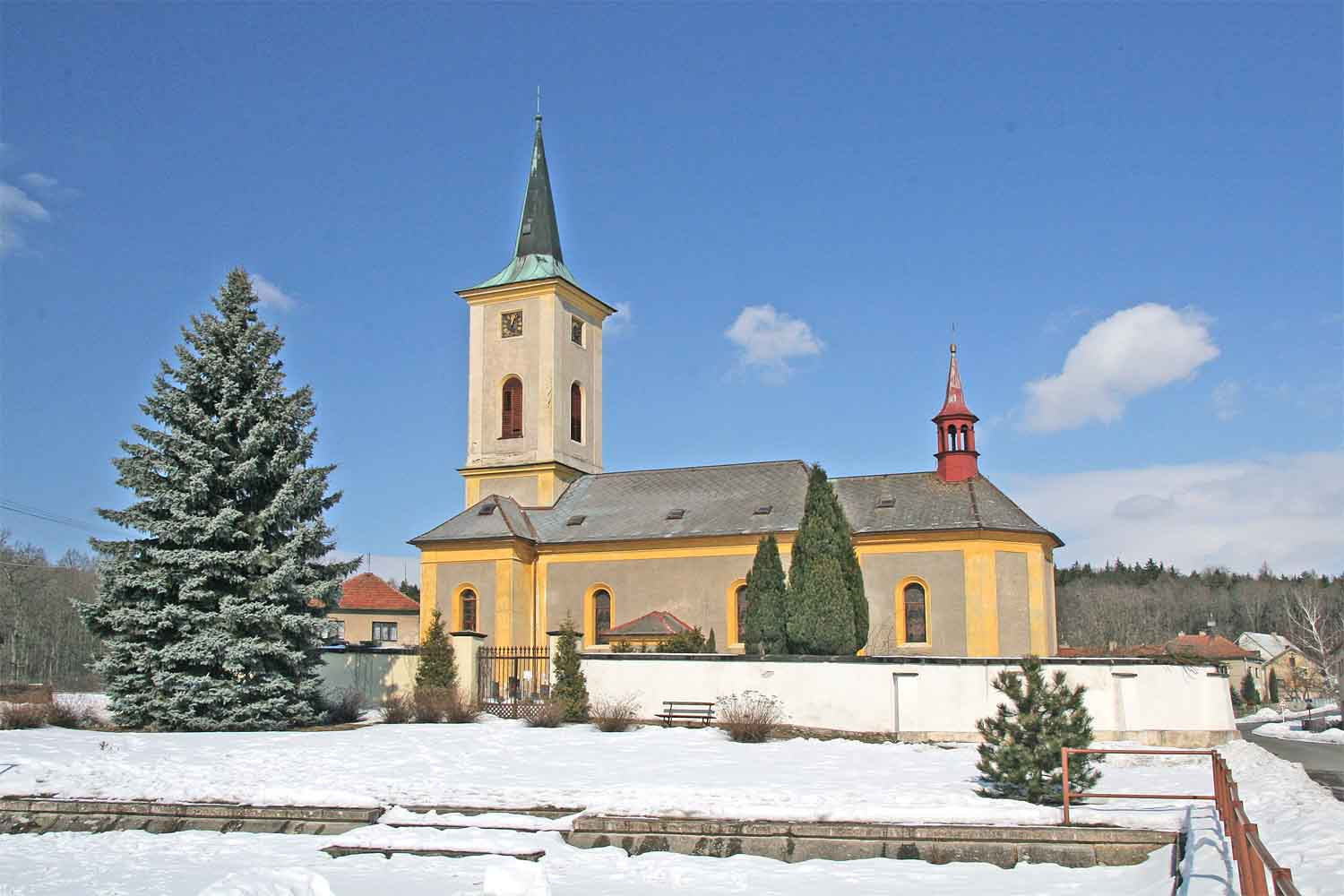
- Church of the Assumption of Jesus

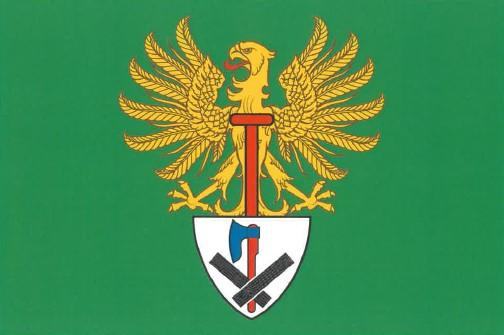
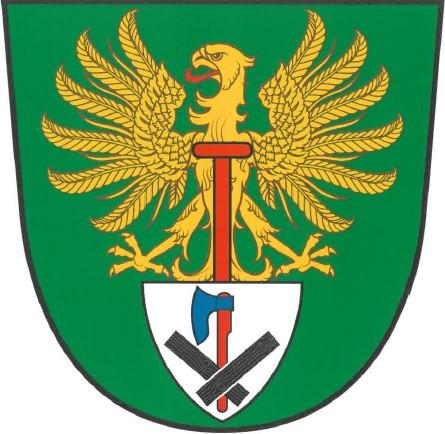
- Flag Coat of arms

- Location in the Czech Republic
- Coordinates: 49°59′49″N 16°10′28″E
- Country: Czech Republic
- Region: Pardubice
- District: Ústí nad Orlicí
- First mentioned: 1292

Area
  - Total: 6.90 km^{2} (2.66 sq mi)
- Elevation: 280 m (920 ft)

Population (2026-01-01)
  - Total: 585
  - Density: 84.8/km^{2} (220/sq mi)
- Time zone: UTC+1 (CET)
  - Summer (DST): UTC+2 (CEST)
- Postal code: 565 44
- Website: www.obecsruby.cz

Sruby is a municipality and village in Ústí nad Orlicí District in the Pardubice Region of the Czech Republic. It has about 600 inhabitants.

Sruby lies approximately 17 kilometres (11 mi) west of Ústí nad Orlicí, 29 km (18 mi) east of Pardubice, and 126 km (78 mi) east of Prague.

== Administrative division ==
Sruby consists of two municipal parts (in brackets population according to the 2021 census):

- Sruby (541)
- Hluboká (25)

== Demographics ==
Historical population
Year	Pop.	±%
1869	595	—
1880	597	+0.3%
1890	615	+3.0%
1900	555	−9.8%
1910	621	+11.9%
1921	642	+3.4%
1930	733	+14.2%
1950	557	−24.0%
1961	599	+7.5%
1970	530	−11.5%
1980	575	+8.5%
1991	559	−2.8%
2001	534	−4.5%
2011	554	+3.7%
2021	566	+2.2%
Source: Censuses
