= Česká Třebová railway station =

Railway station in Česká Třebová, Czech Republic

Česká Třebová
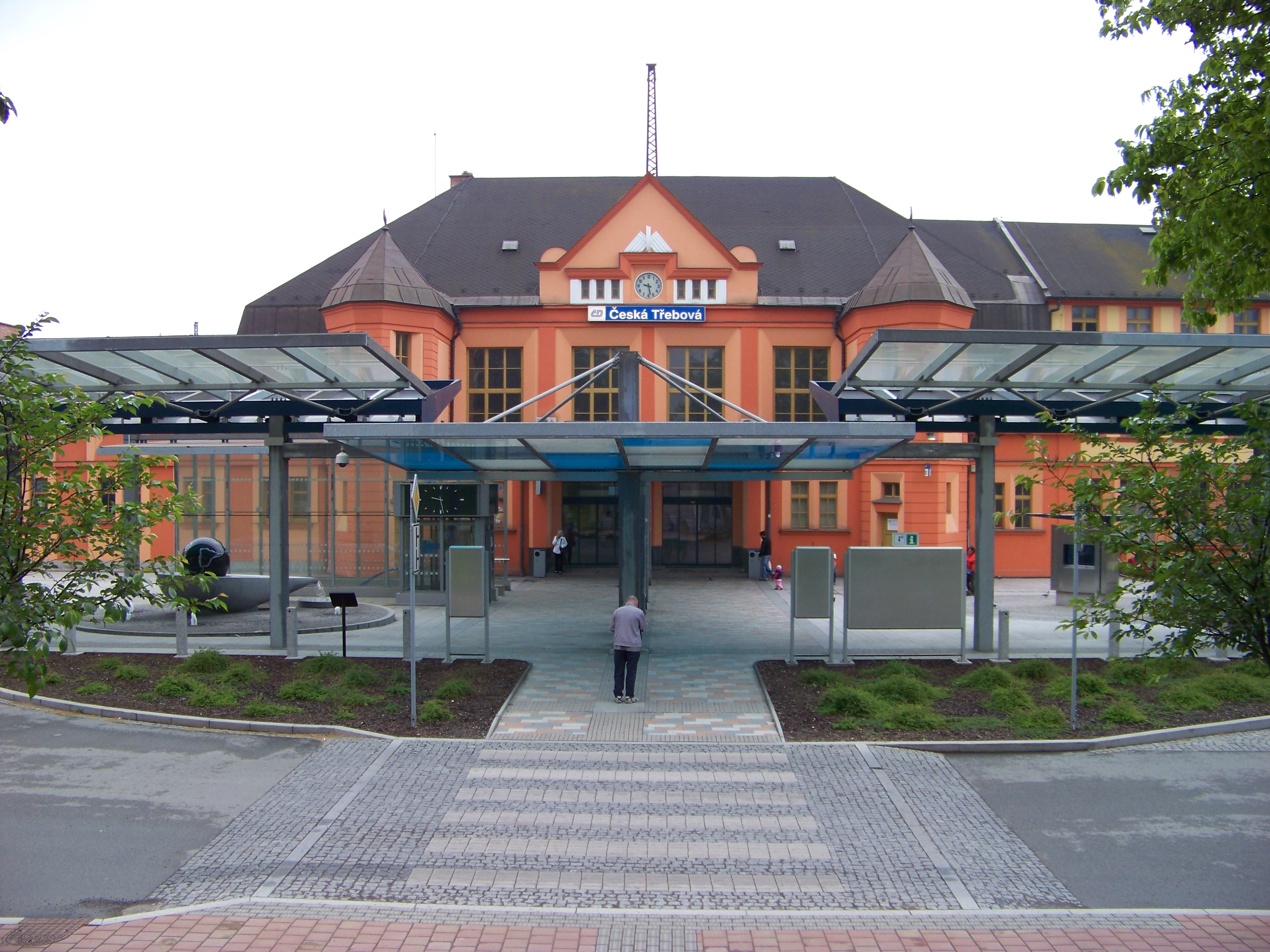
- Česká Třebová railway station

General information
- Location: Česká Třebová; Czech Republic
- Coordinates: 49°53′51″N 16°26′48″E
- Owner: Czech Republic
- Platforms: 8

Construction
- Architect: Anton Jüngling

Other information
- Station code: 54539130

History
- Opened: 20 June 1845; 181 years ago
- Rebuilt: 1901–1909, 1972–1979
- Electrified: 1957
Location

Česká Třebová railway station (Czech: Železniční stanice Česká Třebová) is a major railway junction in the Czech Republic, located in the town of Česká Třebová. It was opened in 1845 on the railway between Prague and Olomouc, and four years later another line to Brno was opened, making it one of the first railway junctions to be completed in the Czech lands, after Břeclav and Přerov.

Today it is served by international and intercity trains from Prague to Brno (and onwards to Austria, Slovakia and Hungary) and from Prague to Olomouc and Ostrava (and onwards to Slovakia and Poland).
