= Olomouc hlavní nádraží =

Railway station in Olomouc, Czech Republic

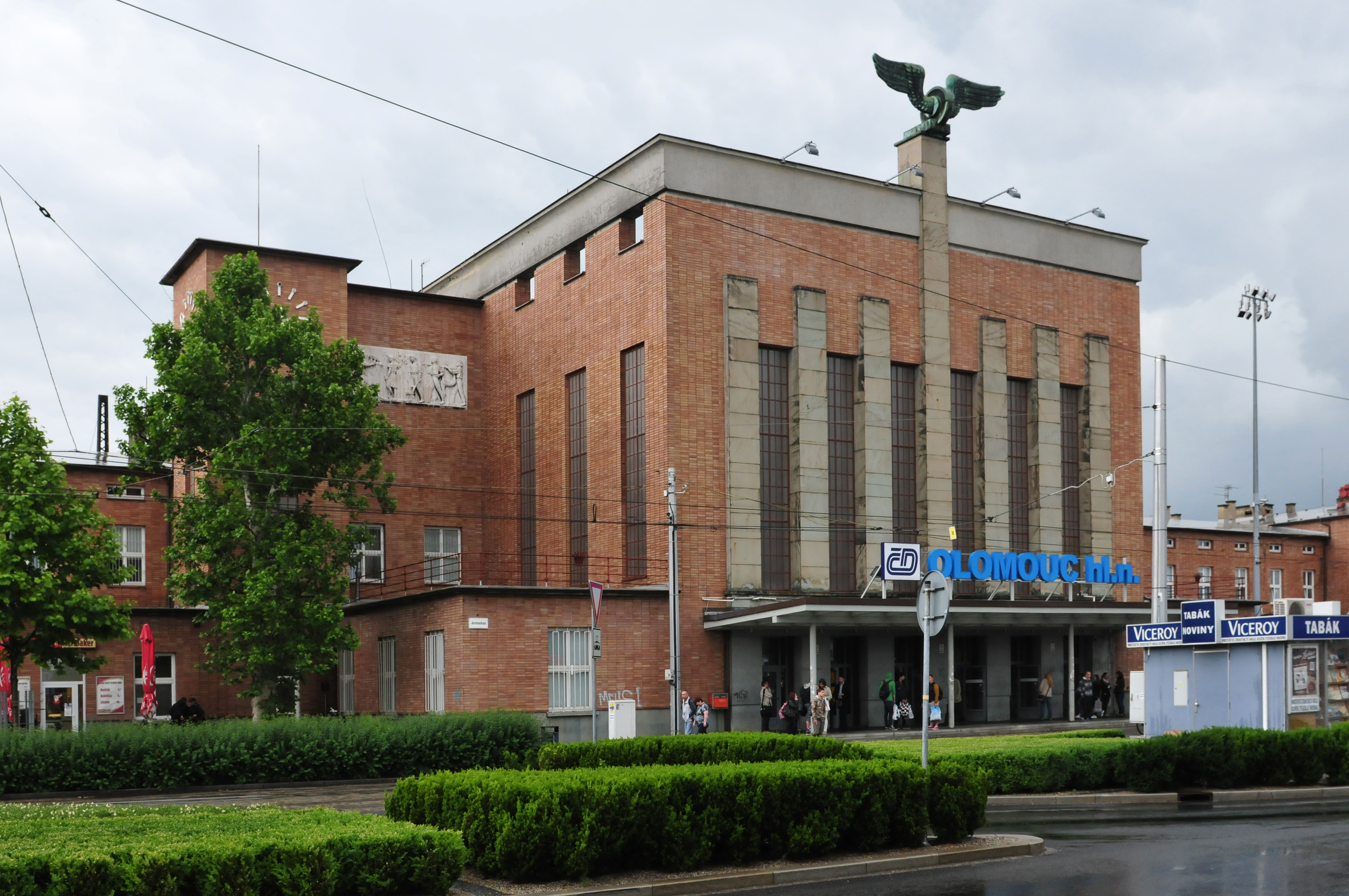
- Front view

General information
- Location: Jeremenkova 103/23, Olomouc; Czech Republic
- Coordinates: 49°59′2″N 17°27′2″E
- Owner: Czech Republic
- Platforms: 5 (9)

Construction
- Architect: Anton Jüngling; Antonín Parkmann

Other information
- Station code: 54343624

History
- Opened: 1 May 1847; 179 years ago
- Rebuilt: 1870–1871; 1936; 2009–2016
- Electrified: 1960-1963
Location

Olomouc hlavní nádraží (abbreviated Olomouc hl. n.; English: 'Olomouc main railway station') is a railway station in Olomouc in the Czech Republic. It is the main train terminus of Olomouc.

== Tracks ==
The station is an important transport junction. All types of trains operated by České dráhy, as well as private transport companies RegioJet, Leo Express and Arriva stop here. The station is located on a crossing of five railway lines:

- 270 – Česká Třebová–Přerov–Bohumín
- 275 – Olomouc–Drahanovice
- 290 – Olomouc–Šumperk
- 301 – Brno–Nezamyslice–Olomouc
- 310 – Olomouc–Krnov–Opava východ

== History ==
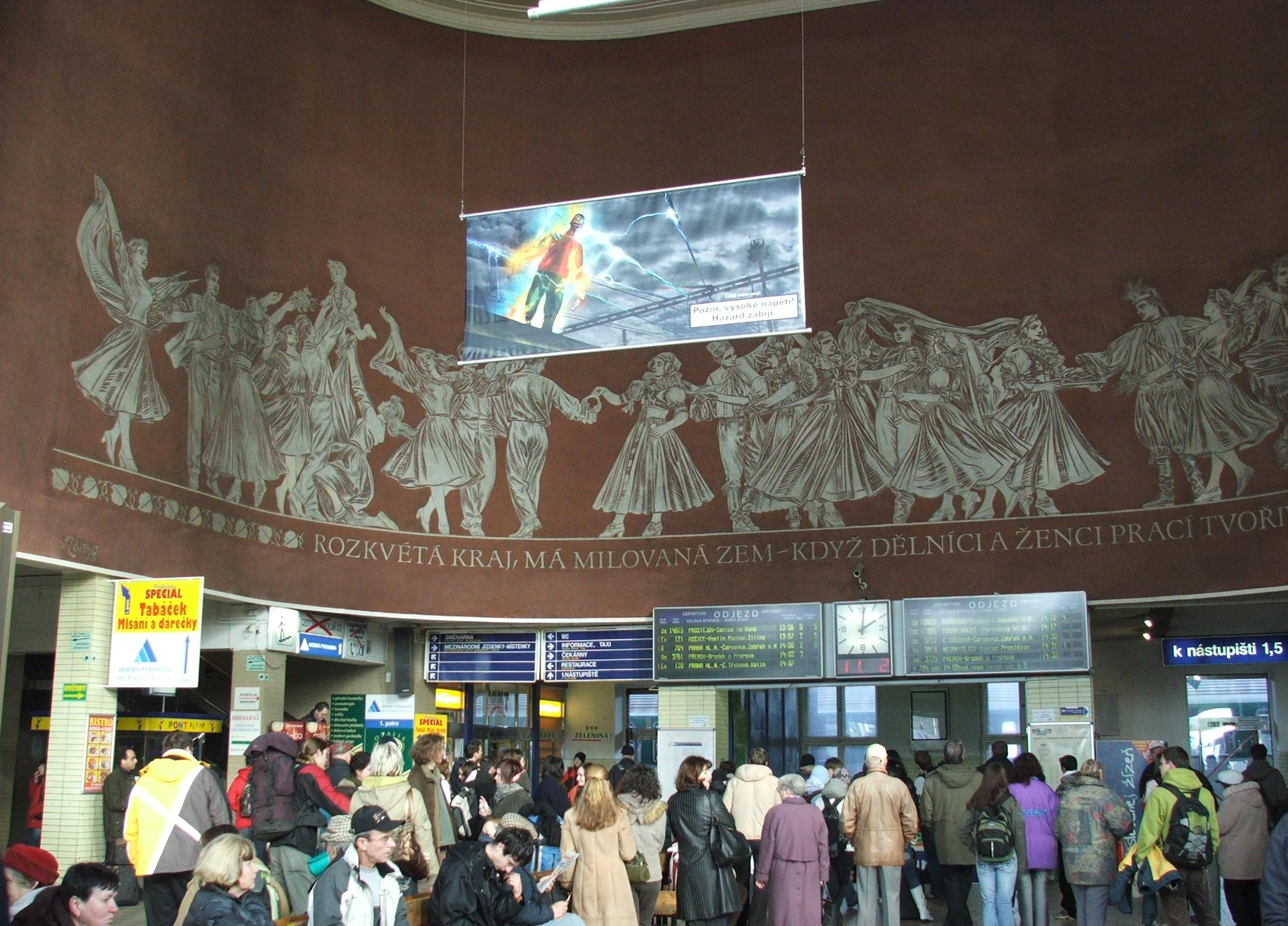
Sgrafitto by Wilhelm Zlámal

The first train reached the station on 17 October 1841 from Přerov; at that time the station was located approximately 800 meters north of the current location in a form of provisional wooden penthouse. The original building was designed by architect Anton Jüngling. As a fort city, the municipality of Olomouc was not allowed to build the station too close to city walls. On 20 August 1845 the first train going from Vienna to Prague went through. Since that year the distant area of the station was connected with the city centre by buses. In 1871 a brick building was built on its actual place, mainly because of connection on the new railway lines. A new city road heading terminus was built in 1885–1888, since 1899 works tram transport with the rest of the agglomeration.

Capacity reasons led to the project of rebuilding and extending the station. A new functionalist building was finished in 1936, led by architect Antonín Parkmann. The current interior of the main hall came from 1960. Socialistically realistic sgraffito about size of 310 m^{2} is composed by the crowd of figures in local folk costumes (Haná) combined with socialistic features including ideological verses or picture of Sputnik. In 2009 a huge reconstruction of the station and the front space was finished to develop transport comfort. Accept new bus and tram terminal was also realized an underpass in the direction of Trocnovská and Trocnovská streets on the opposite way from the main entrance.

== Gallery ==
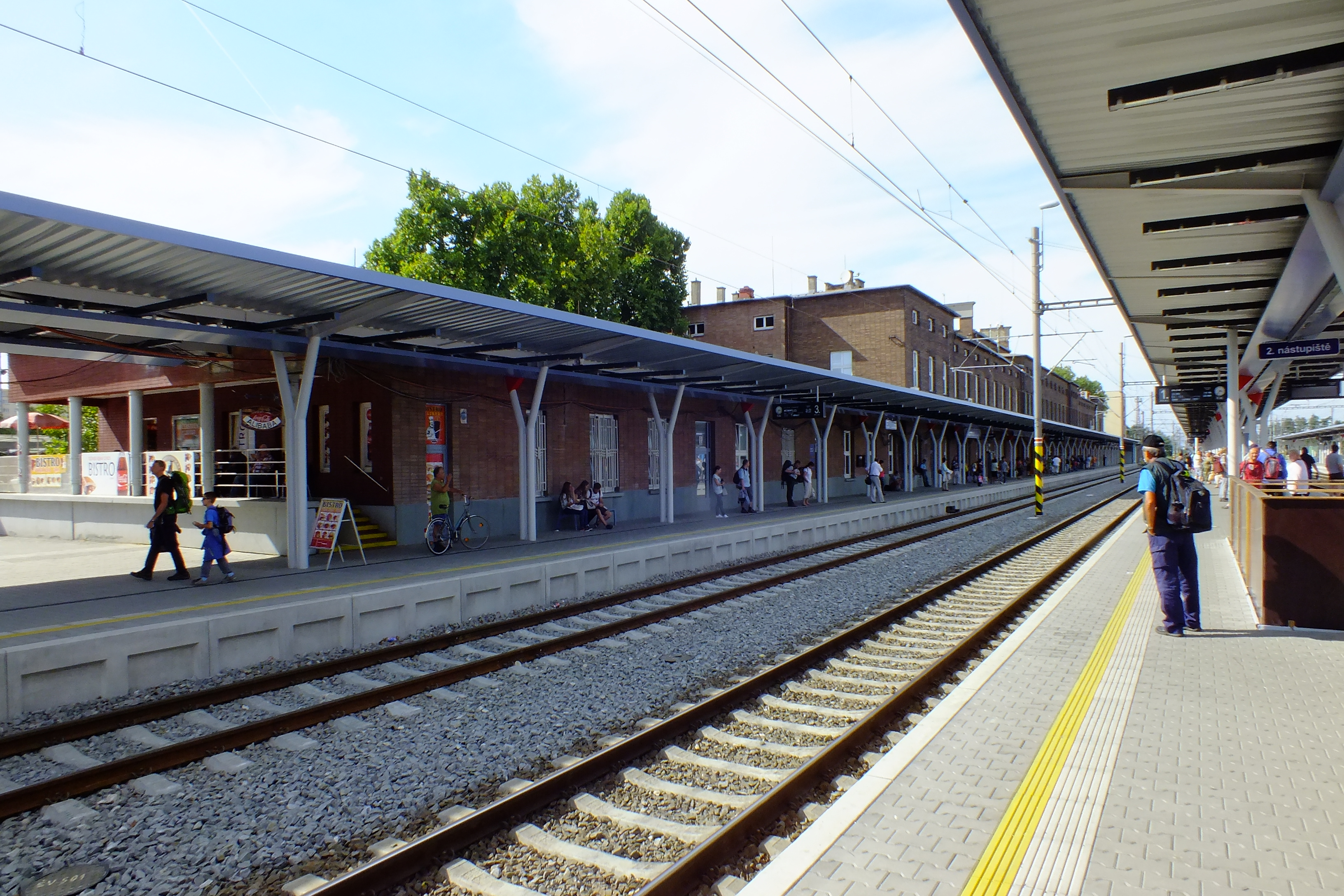
Building

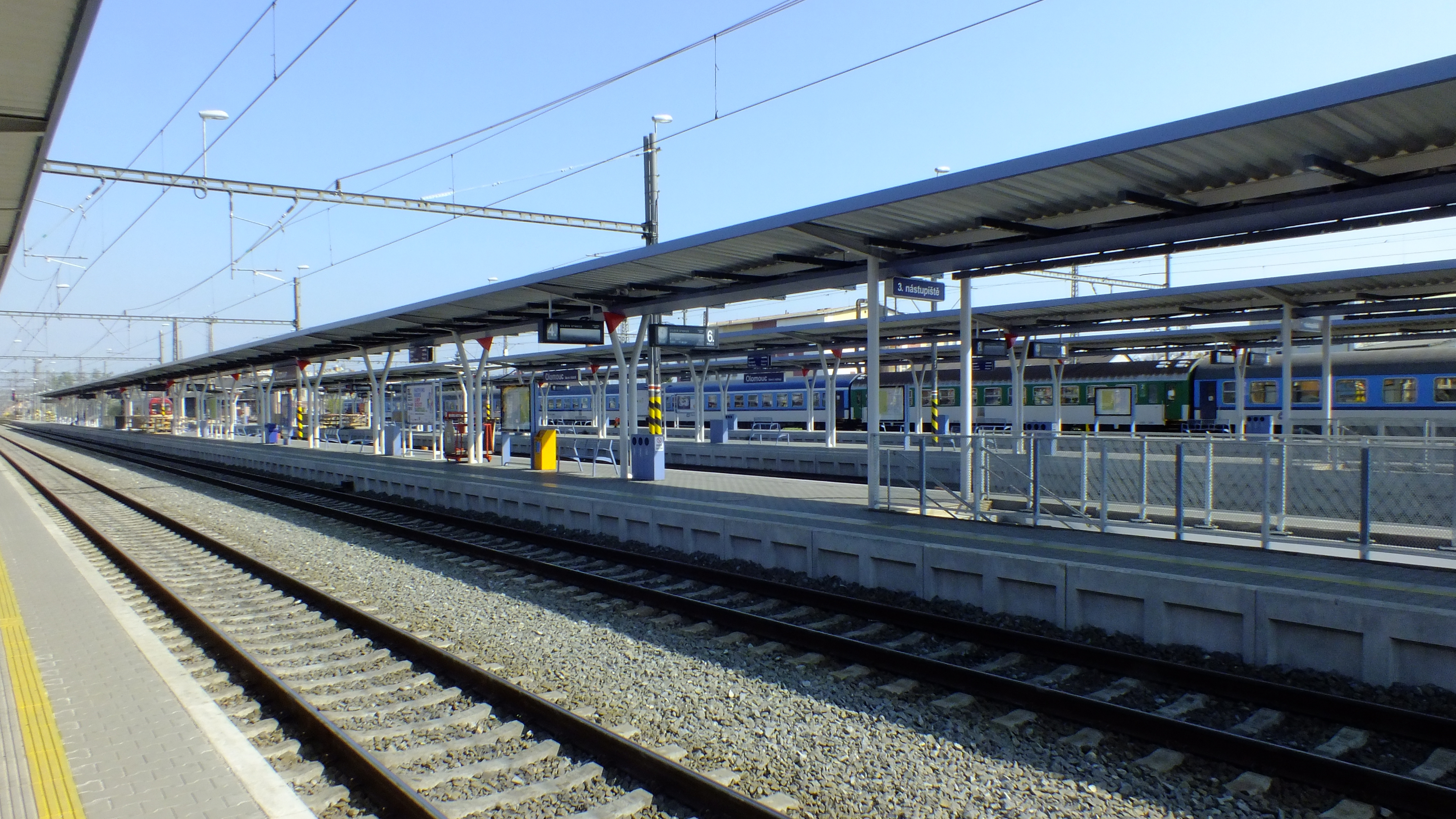
Platforms

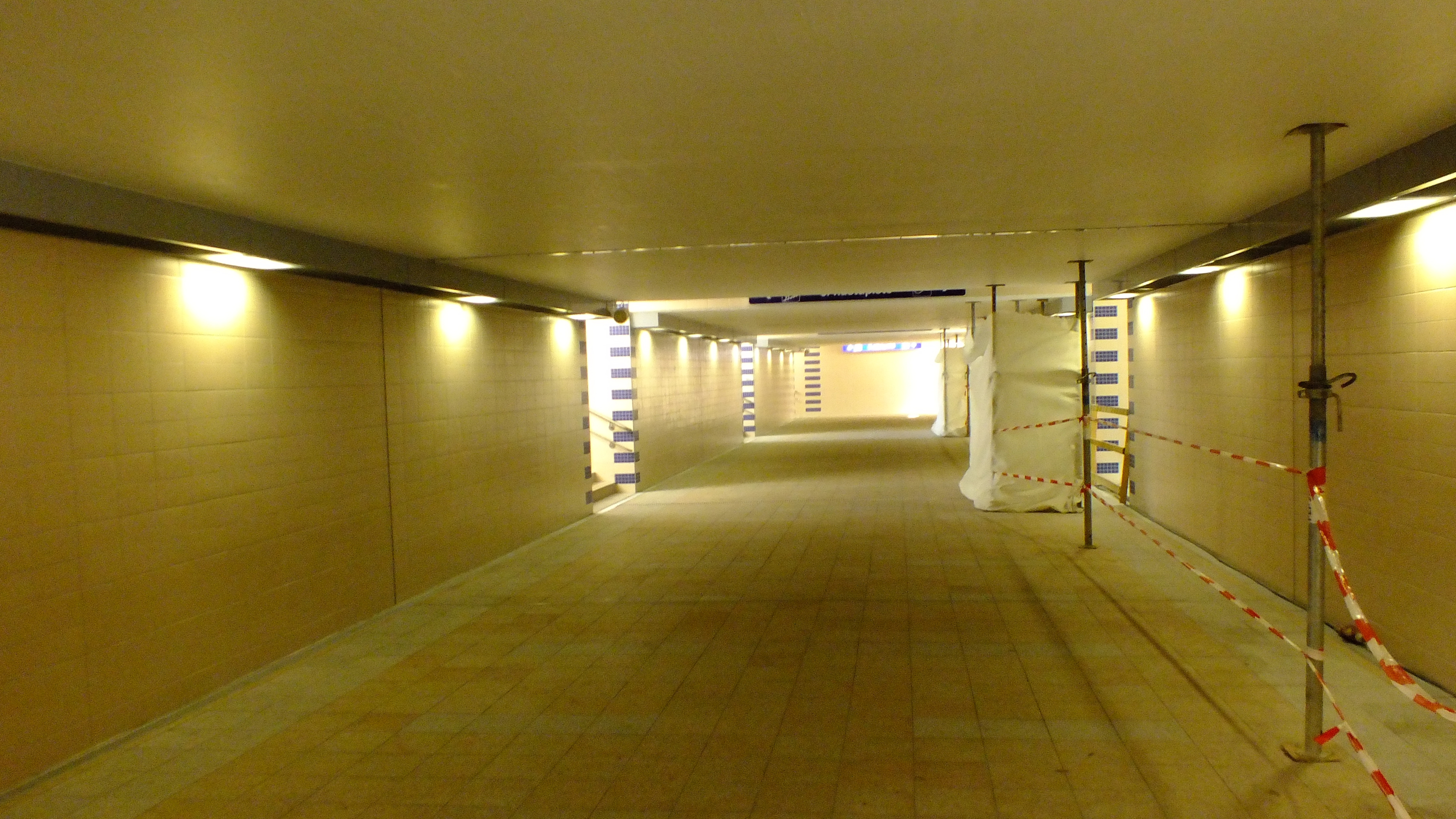
Underpass
