= Praha-Rajská zahrada railway station =

Railway station in Prague, Czech Republic

Coordinates: 50°06′27″N 14°33′36″E

Praha-Rajská zahrada is a railway halt (Czech: zastávka) located in Kyje in Prague 14, Czech Republic. It lies on the railway line from Prague to Nymburk, near the metro station of the same name, and was opened on 10 December 2023. It is served by trains from Prague to Nymburk and Neratovice, as well as local services integrated into the Esko Prague system. It is connected to Prague Metro (a footbridge was opened in 2024), and to local and city buses.

The name Rajská zahrada (lit. 'paradise garden') is derived from an orchard that was located nearby behind a railway siding, now forming a row of allotments on Borská Street.

The station was built as a part of a reconstruction of the railway between Praha-Vysočany and Mstětice.

== Services ==
Preceding station	Esko Prague	Following station
Praha-Vysočany towards Praha hl.n.	S2	Praha-Horní Počernice towards Nymburk hl.n. or Kolín
Praha-Vysočany towards Praha hl.n.	S22	Praha-Horní Počernice towards Milovice
Praha-Vysočany towards Praha hl.n.	S3	Praha-Satalice towards Všetaty, Mělník or Mladá Boleslav město
Praha-Vysočany towards Praha Masarykovo nádraží	S34	Praha-Satalice towards Praha-Čakovice
Praha-Horní Počernice towards Milovice	S9	Praha-Vysočany towards Strančice or Benešov u Prahy
