= Praha-Běchovice railway station =

Railway station in the Czech Republic

Praha-Běchovice

General information
- Location: Prague; Czech Republic
- Coordinates: 50°4′54″N 14°35′55.4″E
- Elevation: 235 meters
- Owner: Czech Republic
- Operator: Správa železnic
- Line: Hlavní město Praha
- Platforms: 2
- Tracks: 4 (passenger); 6 (freight)
- Connections: Autobus

Other information
- Status: City
- Station code: 530162

History
- Opened: 1845
Location

Praha-Běchovice is a railway station in Prague, Czech Republic. It is located on the electrified track from Praha hlavní nádraží to Kolín and Česká Třebová. In the timetable for passengers, it is listed in the list of passenger trains in table 011 and is also part of Prague Integrated Transport. The station also has a stop Praha-Běchovice střed.

The station is mainly located in the territory of Běchovice, the Prague headland extends into the Dolní Počernice and Blatov district to Klánovice. The station building stands on the right side of the tracks in the direction of Prague in the western part of Běchovice (Nová Dubeč) at the address Českobrodská 54.

== History ==
The railway station in Běchovice was opened on 1 September 1845, together with the entire line from Olomouc to Prague. It was one of two stations (the other is Masarykovo nádraží) that were located on this line in the current territory of Prague, the stops in this section were not opened. At the time of opening, the section between Běchovice and Masaryk station was double-tracked, the rest of the line was single-tracked. At that time, Běchovice station had only 3 tracks and the platform was in front of the station building, which had a waiting room and a ticket office.

The current layout of the station dates back to the 1920s, when the section Běchovice–Poříčany was triple-tracked and the entire line was electrified. In the direction of Praha-Libeň railway station, the construction was not completed at the time and only the two outer tracks of the future triple track were still in operation.

In the years 2006–2011, a major modernization of the entire station took place, and as part of it, the completed three-track line to Libno was put into operation at the end of 2009.

=== Railway accident ===
An accident occurred on 15 October 1965, after seven o'clock in the morning near the station at the operation point in Prague, where a passenger train collided with a moving electric locomotive in the fog. Two people died in the accident and others were injured.

== Description ==
There are three main traffic tracks in the station. The station is made up of two circuits: in the main direction from Úvaly towards Prague-Libeň it is a passenger station (including the former Blatov branch – after incorporation to the station, it was one of the station's districts, later it was incorporated into the passenger station), south of the main line, and parallel to it, is the freight station. The entrance from Blatov to the freight station is made as a switchback, called "Suez" - the track in an even direction leads through an underpass under the main traffic tracks.

At Prague's operation point, two lines leave the perimeter of the passenger station - the line to Prague-Libeň (and further to Masarykovo and Hlavní nádraží) and the freight line to the Prague-Malešice (opened in 1939). This line is part of the freight route through Prague. It starts in Běchovice na Blatov, continues through the local freight station and through Malešice (with a branch to Hostivař), the former Vršovice marshalling station, Praha-Krč, via Braník Bridge to Prague-Radotín station.

Turnouts and light signals are adjusted remotely. Until the activation of remote control from the Central Dispatch Office (CDP), two dispatchers and one station supervisor served here, and now there is one standby dispatcher (PPV). The station is controlled alternately during the day by a dispatcher or track dispatcher from the CDP. The dispatcher also manages freight trains in the station.

In the Prague operation point, the station is bridged by a flyover, the D0 motorway.

=== Passenger station ===
The current station building dates from the 1950s and its nominal location is km 397,001. There are two platforms for passengers connected to the station building by an underpass, which is also served by the tracks from the freight station running around the building. Before the reconstruction, both platforms were islands, since 2009 the further platform has only one edge. Tickets are no longer sold here.

=== Freight station ===
Běchovická station also served as a classification yard. Part of its track was demolished in 2005 after its cancellation, even before the modernization of the track and the construction of the First Railway Corridor Berlin–Prague–Vienna (2006–2009). Freight trains pass through the freight station in the direction Úvaly–Prague-Malešice (through the interchange) and vice versa, and in case of exclusions and emergencies, also passenger trains.

From Cologne's station head, it ran from the freight yard parallel to the entrance track, under the "Suez" bridge (it still has a two-track profile after the modernization of the station) and then zig-zag approximately 2 kilometers long siding to the Prague-Běchovice research institutes. This siding was demolished, but its remains are still visible: railway lamps stand at the canceled crossings in Mladý Běchovice and Podnikatelská Streets, the track is covered with asphalt at the crossing with Podnikatelská Street, and sections of the siding are also preserved in the asphalt in the area of the research institutes.

=== Water tower ===
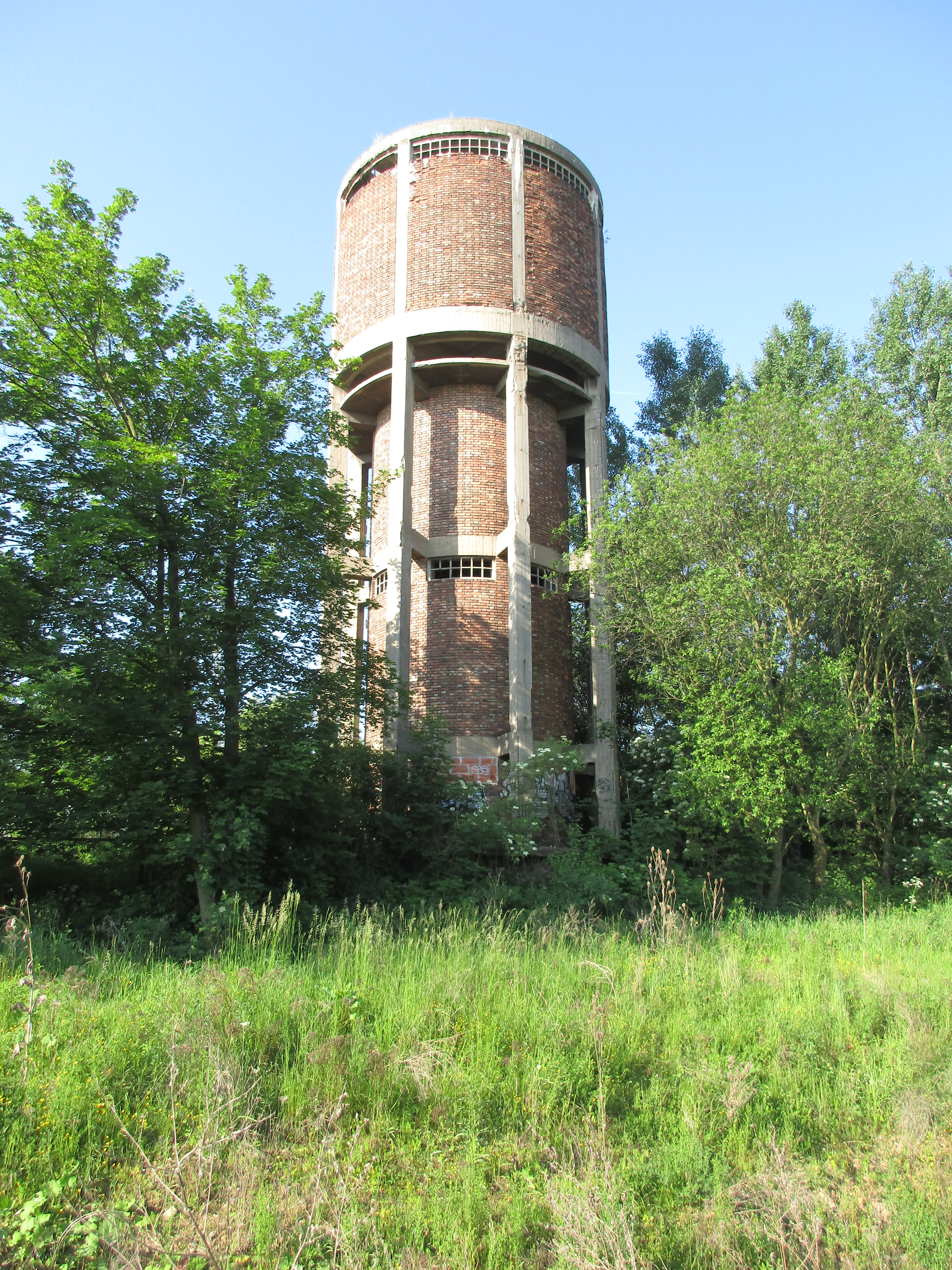
Běchovice railway reservoir

The Railway Reservoir was built in 1937 as a replacement for the original reservoir. It was part of the station since its opening in 1845 and was demolished only in 1951 during the construction of the third track, which was later demolished. The water from the tank fed the locomotives with service water from the brook Blatovský potok until the end of steam operation on the line.

The water tower consists of a four-story cylindrical reinforced concrete skeleton, the top floor of which is made of red bricks. This floor was used to house the tank. The lower floors are inside an open shell and are also lined with red bricks. Inside is a cylindrical shaft for the stairs and the delivery and supply pipes. Individual floors are illuminated by glass blocks placed in their upper parts.

The author of the project is the ČSD Project Office and the architect is most likely Josef Danda.

== See also ==
- List of Czech rail accidents
