= English College in Prague =

The English College in Prague
- Anglické gymnázium, obecně prospěšná společnost
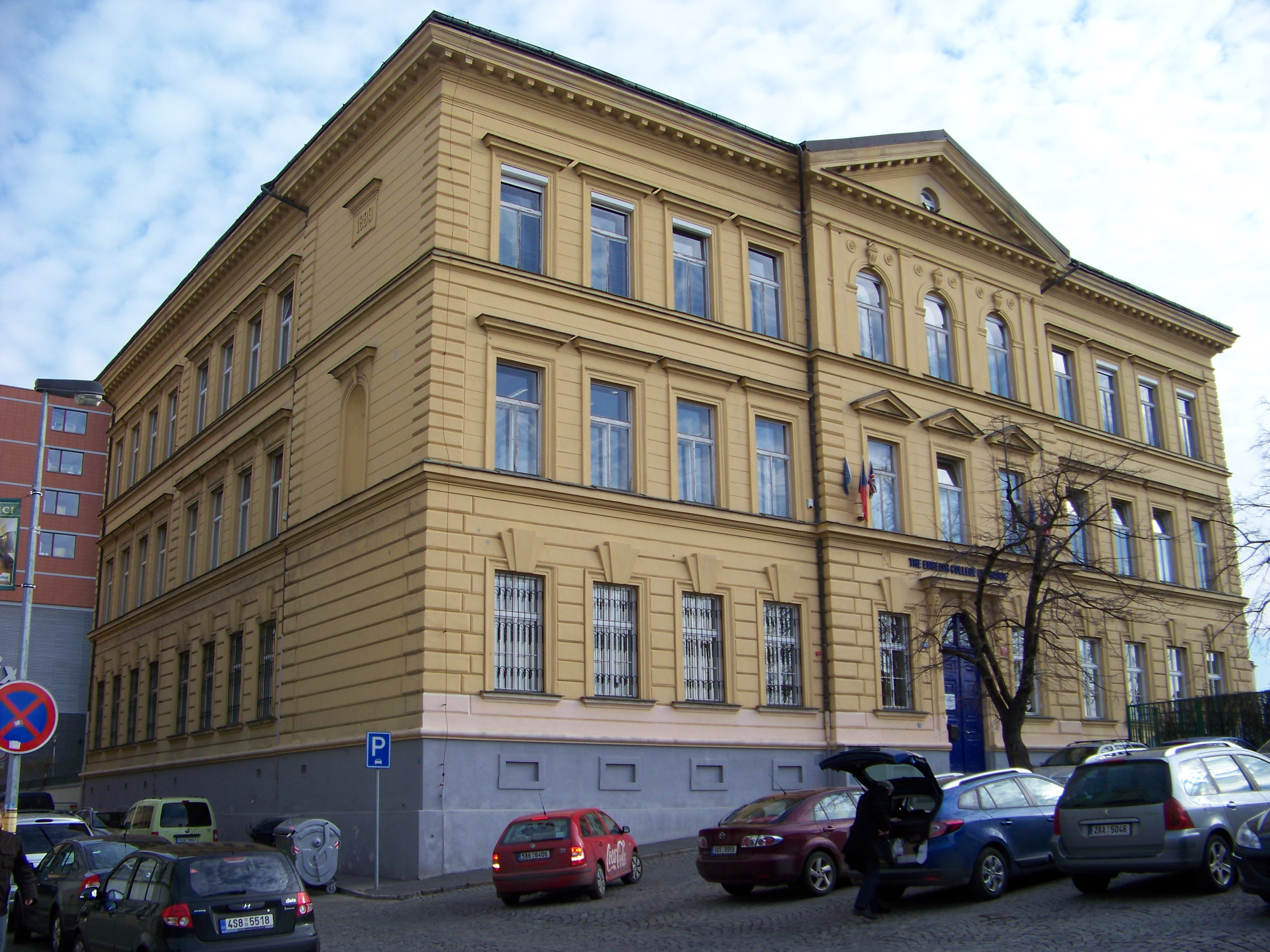
- Vysočany, anglické gymnázium

Location
- Sokolovska 320; 190 00 Praha 9 – Vysočany; Czech Republic
- 50°6′35.57″N 14°29′59.54″E

Information
- Established: 1994
- Founder: The English College Foundation
- Chairman: Denis Keefe CMG
- Headmaster: Dr Nigel Brown
- Age range: 12–19
- Language: English, Czech
- Website: www.englishcollege.cz

The English College in Prague (Czech: Anglické gymnázium, obecně prospěšná společnost) is a co-educational, selective Czech-British grammar school, providing an academic education in the English language for students aged 13–19 years. The ECP is a 6-year grammar school, with Czech students arriving from the 7th grade of Czech schools. It is a member of the Headmasters' & Headmistresses' Conference.

The college has around 370 students, of whom around 70% are Czech, and 30% from foreign countries, such as those in Eastern Asia, Russia and Eastern Europe.

== History ==
In 1990, the suggestion was made at a meeting of British diplomats with President Václav Havel to set up a new school in Prague similar to the Prague English Grammar School, which had flourished intermittently in Prague between 1927 and 1954. In 1992 a new charity, The English College Foundation, began raising funds. The intention was to found a secondary school which would provide an academic education on British lines, meet the intense demand for English and contribute to the development of Czechoslovakia's emerging democracy. The project was endorsed by the three main political parties in the United Kingdom, and Václav Havel and Charles, Prince of Wales agreed to be joint patrons of the English College. By 1994, a suitable building had been found, conveniently situated next to the metro station in Vysočany twelve minutes from the centre of Prague, and the school opened its doors in September that year. Following the death of Václav Havel in 2011, Karel Schwarzenberg became its Czech Patron.

The college is governed by a volunteer Board of Governors drawn from the Czech Republic and the UK and is a public benefit organisation.

== Campus ==
The college is situated at the metro station Vysočanská and near a shopping centre with a food court. The school buildings include specialised science laboratories, an art centre and music room, a computer centre, a well-equipped library, a multi-purpose hall and an all-weather outdoor area.

== Curriculum ==
The curriculum consists of two leading, internationally recognised educational programmes, the IGCSE and International Baccalaureate (IB). Along with completing the IB Diploma in the sixth year, the students also obtain the Czech Maturita, which is the legal document representing the completion of Czech secondary education, and allows them to apply to Czech universities. Czech language is present as a part of the Maturita, although for non-Czech speakers, a programme without Czech is also available.

== Extracurricular activities ==
The college provides numerous in-school and extra-curricular activities including rock-climbing, chess and poetry slams and many opportunities to become involved in charity fundraising and voluntary activities.

== See also ==
- British Chamber Of Commerce
