= Praha-Satalice railway station =

Railway station in Satalice, Czech Republic

Praha-Satalice
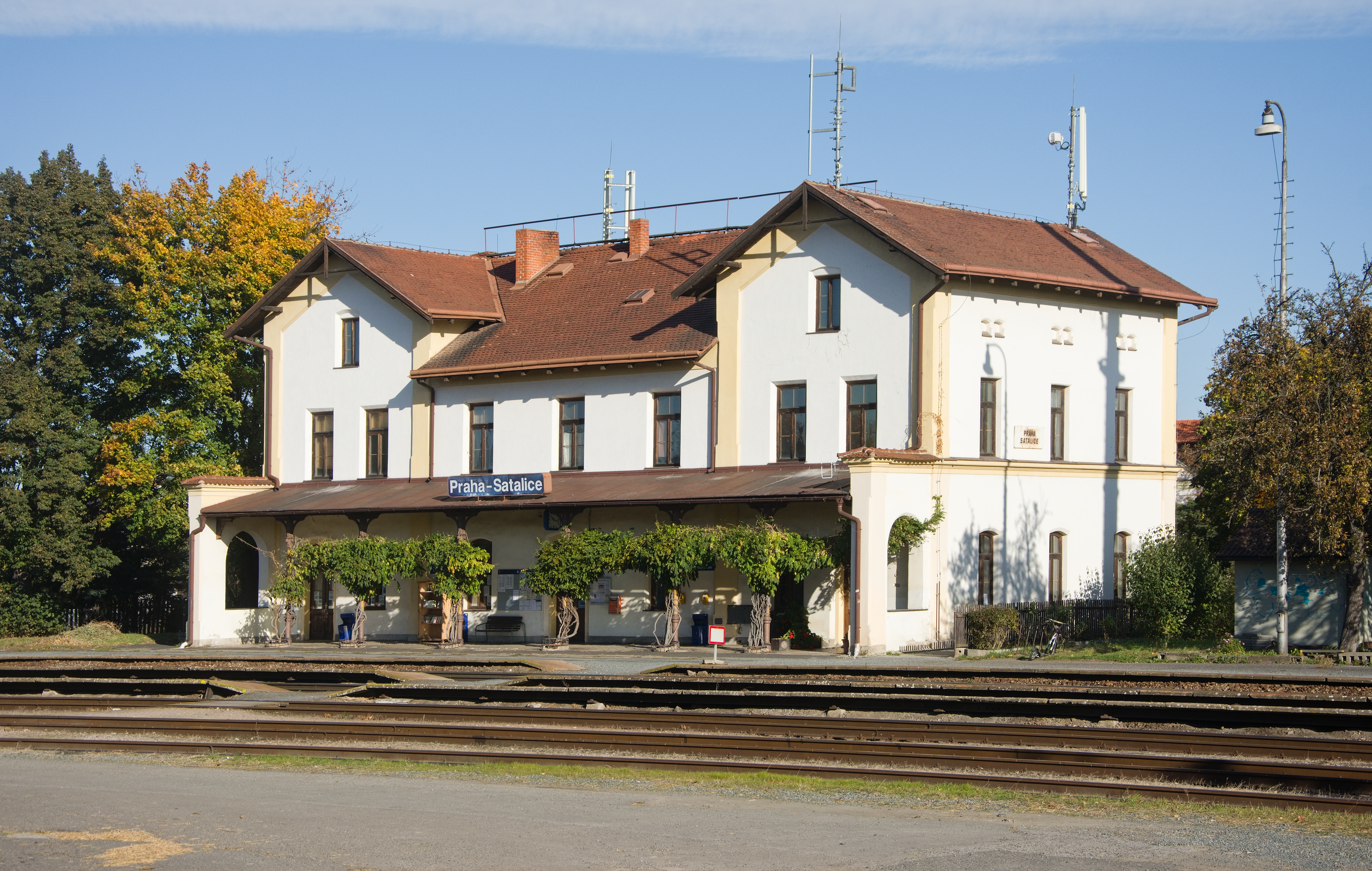
- Station building

General information
- Coordinates: 50°7′23.47″N 14°34′14.88″E
- Line: 070 (Praha – Turnov)

Other information
- Station code: 54547661
- Fare zone: PID: B

History
- Opened: 1872

Services
Preceding station	Esko Prague	Following station
Praha-Vysočany towards Praha hl.n.	S3	Praha-Kbely towards Všetaty, Mělník or Mladá Boleslav město
Location

Praha-Satalice railway station (Czech: železniční stanice Praha-Satalice) is located on line 070 between Prague and Turnov, in the district of Satalice, part of the Prague 9 administrative district. The line as it runs in and out of the station is single tracked, the nearest passing point being at Čakovice. The station building was listed as a cultural monument in 2002.
