= Praha-Vysočany railway station =

Railway station in Prague, Czech Republic

Praha-Vysočany
- New entrance to the station

General information
- Location: Czech Republic
- Coordinates: 50.11229°N 14.49726°E
- Lines: 070 (Praha –) Praha-Čakovice – Turnov; 071 Praha – Praha-Čakovice; 231 (Praha –) Lysá nad Labem – Kolín; 232 Praha – Lysá nad Labem – Milovice
- Platforms: 3
- Tracks: 6
- Train operators: České dráhy, Arriva, KŽC Doprava
- Connections: B Line B: Vysočanská

History
- Opened: 1872

Services
Preceding station	Esko Prague	Following station
Praha hl.n. Terminus	S2	Praha-Rajská zahrada towards Nymburk hl.n. or Kolín
Praha hl.n. Terminus	S3	Praha-Rajská zahrada towards Mělník
Praha-Rajská zahrada towards Milovice	S9	Praha hl.n. towards Strančice or Benešov u Prahy
Praha Masarykovo nádraží Terminus	S34	Praha-Rajská zahrada towards Praha-Čakovice
Praha hl.n. Terminus	R21	Praha-Čakovice towards Tanvald
Location

Praha-Vysočany railway station (Czech: železniční stanice Praha-Vysočany) is a mainline railway station located in Vysočany, Prague 9. Located at the northeastern end of Nové spojení, it is a junction between track 070, to Turnov, and track 231 to Kolín via Nymburk. Historically, trains from Nymburk terminated at the now demolished Praha-Těšnov railway station. It is located within walking distance of Vysočanská station on the Prague Metro.

== History ==
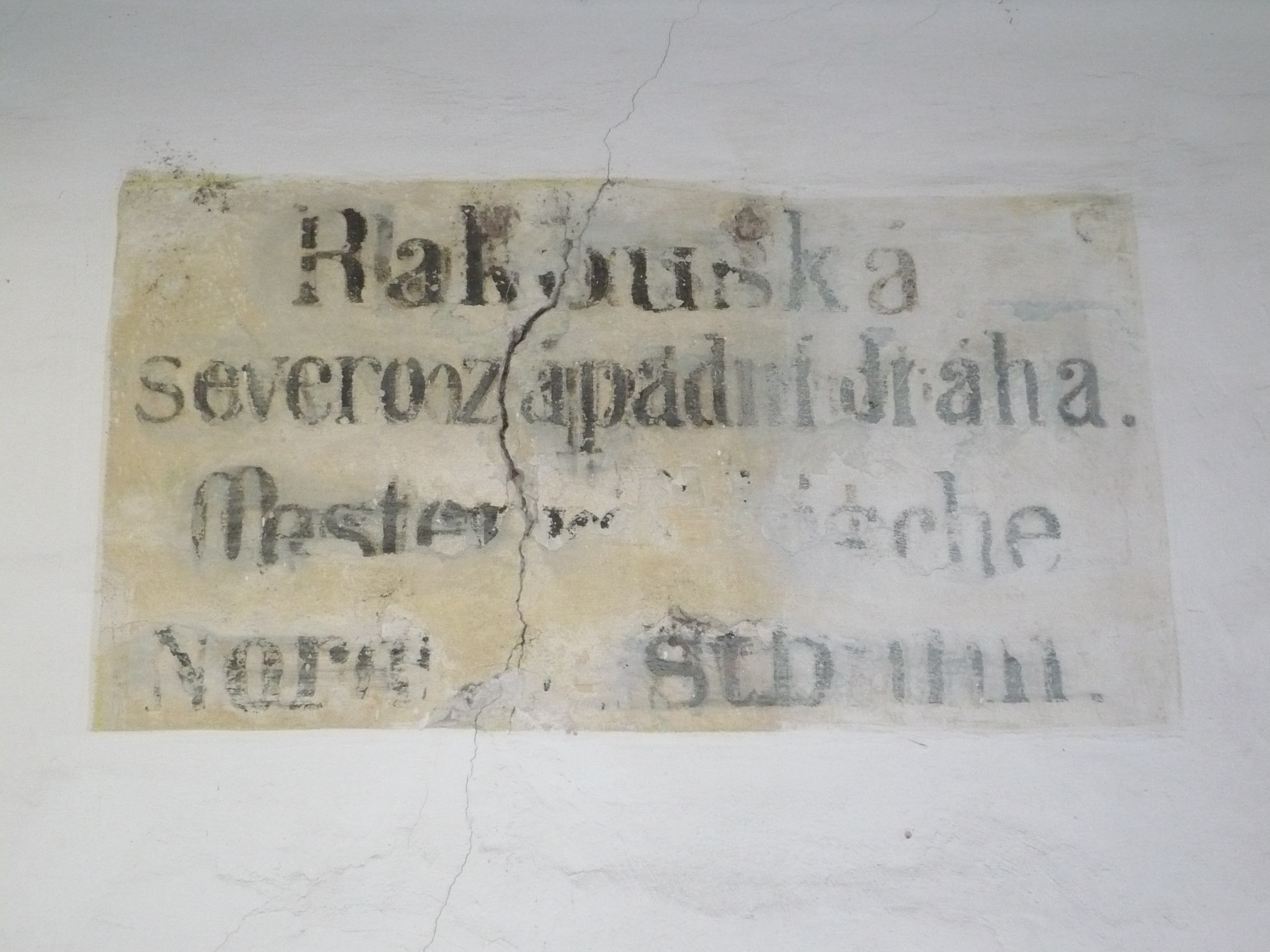
Historical Czech–German inscriptions in their original place in the eastern hall of the old station building

The line from Neratovice to Prague, which led to today's main station via the Vítkov line, was opened in 1872 as part of the Turnov–Kralupy–Prague Railway. The station opened at the same time under the name Vysočany.

In 1873, the line from Hradec Králové via Nymburk to Prague, part of the Austrian Northwestern Railway, was opened. From Vysočany, it continued through Karlín to what later became Praha-Těšnov railway station. Passenger service on the Praha-Vysočany – Praha-Těšnov section ended on 1 July 1972, and freight traffic on it stopped in 1984. The Vítkov line was closed in 2008 when the Nové spojení went into operation, and a cycle path was built on a large part of its former trackbed.

The formerly independent town of Vysočany became part of Prague in 1922, but the station was renamed to its current name, Praha-Vysočany, only in 1941. The passenger part of Praha-Libeň railway station is also located in Vysočany.

From 2003 to 2021, the station used the HIS-VOICE passenger information system, which provided train information through station announcements and information displays. In 2021, it was replaced by the INISS system.

Between 2020 and 2024, the station was rebuilt as part of the modernisation of the Mstětice – Praha-Vysočany line section, and it reopened to passengers in December 2023.

== Modernisation ==
Between May 2020 and February 2024, the station was rebuilt as part of the optimisation of the line section between Mstětice and Praha-Vysočany. The project was commissioned by Správa železnic and carried out by a consortium of Subterra, OHLA ŽS, Eurovia CS and Elektrizace železnic Praha. It cost CZK 5.41 billion excluding VAT, of which up to about CZK 3.15 billion came from the European Union's Connecting Europe Facility. Altogether, 14.7 km of the line were modernised, with 38.6 km of new track and 47 new switches. The project was designed by SUDOP Praha and Metroprojekt Praha.

The rebuilt station has three main and three passing tracks. It has three new platforms, two island platforms 300 and 302 metres long and one side platform 220 metres long, all raised to 550 mm above the top of the rail. Two new underpasses connect the platforms, and a new ticket hall replaced the original station building. Lifts and escalators provide barrier-free access to all platforms.

The section between the Skály junction and Praha-Vysočany was widened to three electrified tracks, which are used by trains towards both Lysá nad Labem and Turnov. A new stop, Praha-Rajská zahrada, was also built as part of the project, with a footbridge over Chlumecká street linking it to metro line B. The project was entered in the transport and technical infrastructure category of the Stavba roku 2025 competition.

== Gallery ==
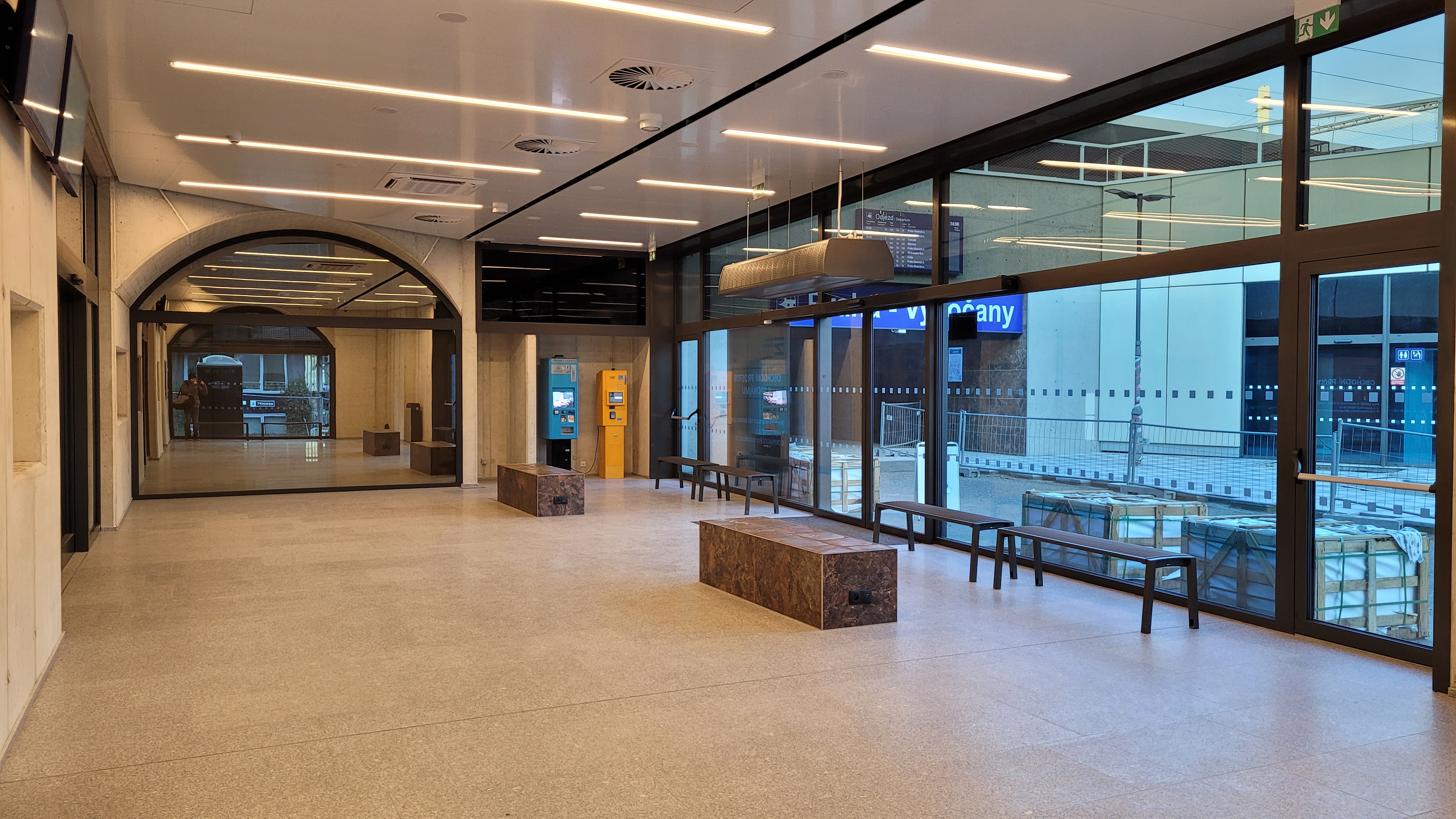
New station hall

Platforms in the evening (2025)

New platforms at night

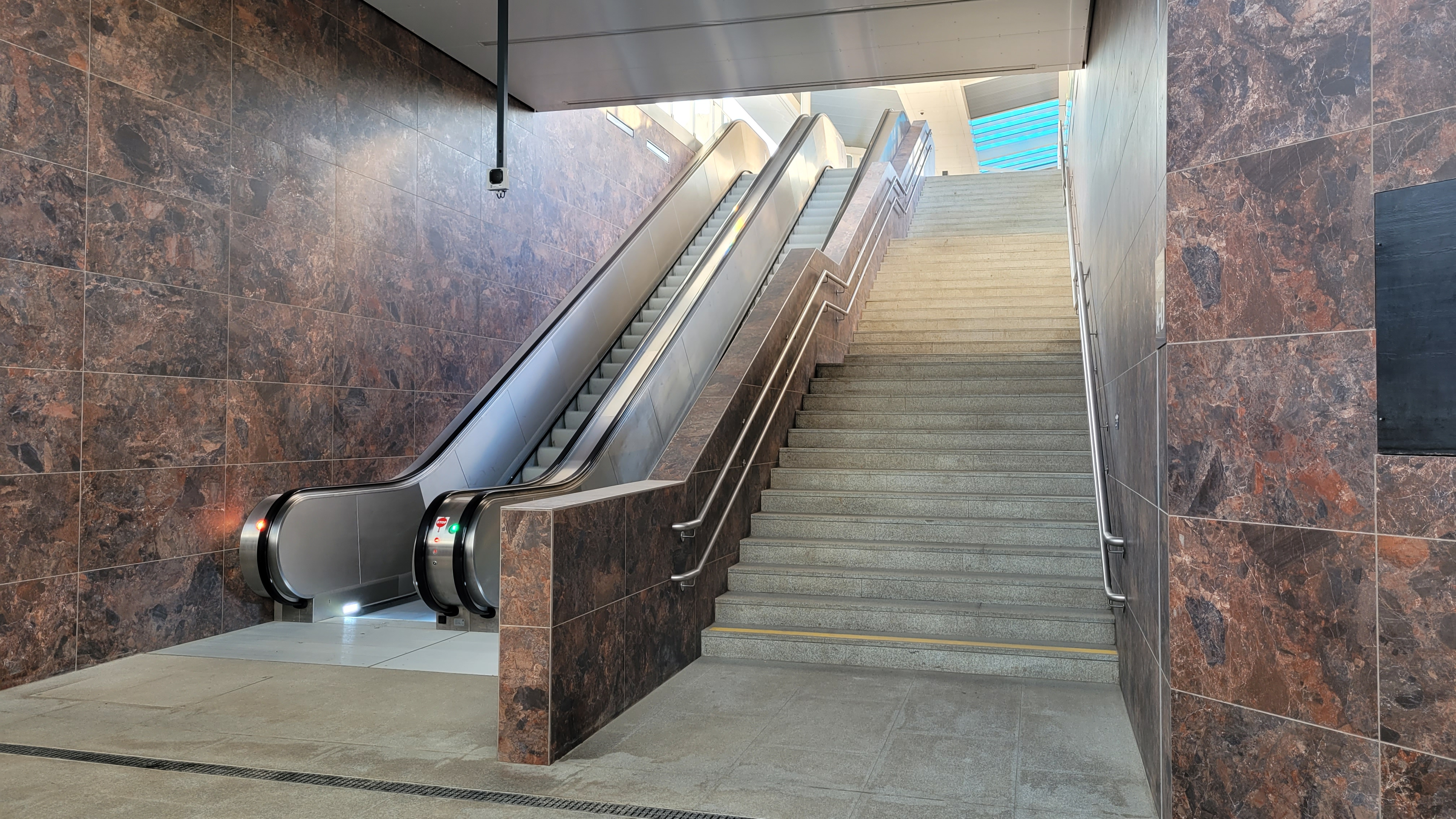
Western exit from the underpass
