= Nové spojení =

Coordinates: 50°5′33″N 14°27′55″E

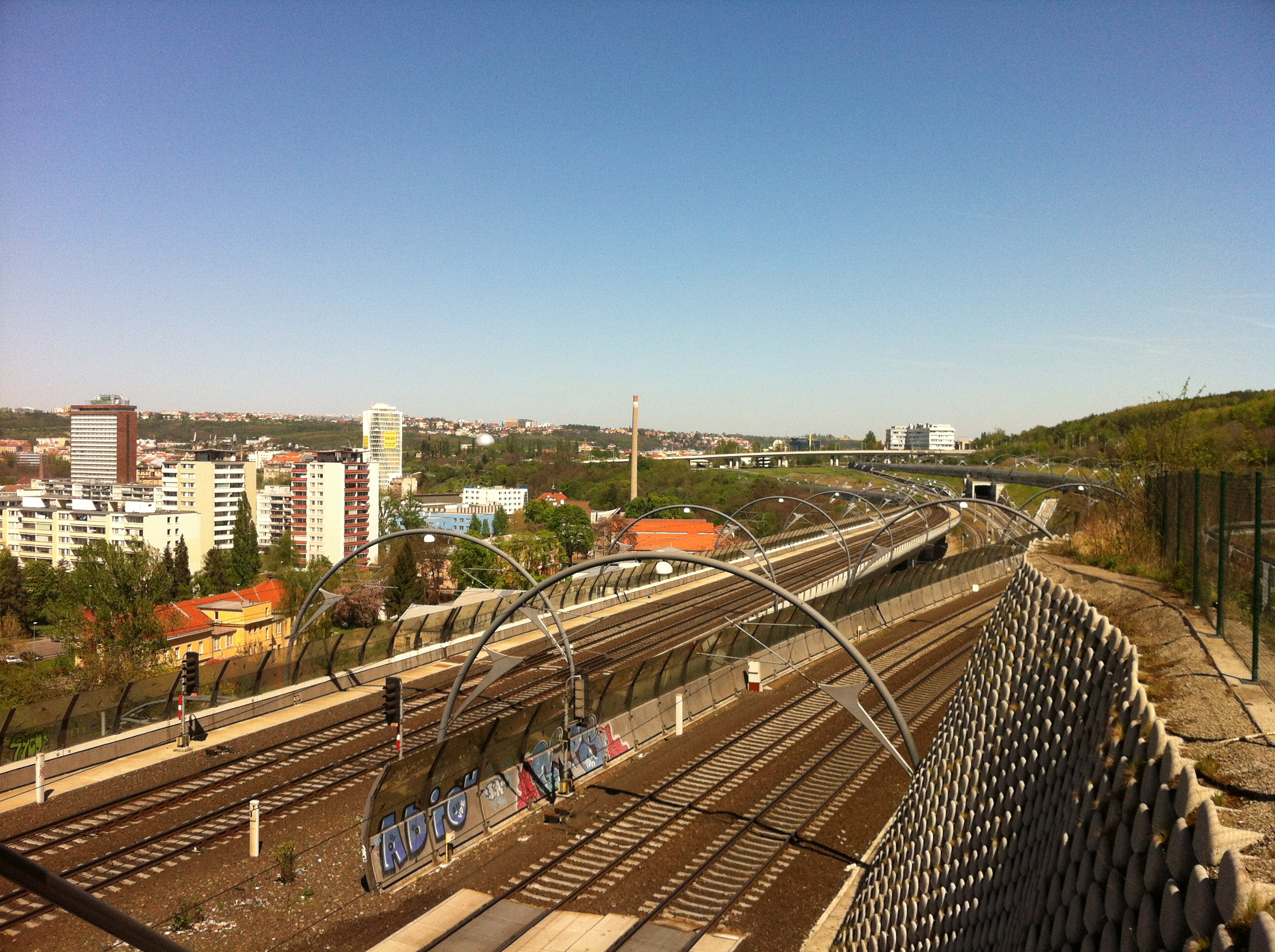
- The Sluncová bridge section of Nové spojení seen from the cycle path which replaced the previous Vítkov tunnel.

Overview
- Owner: SŽDC
- Locale: Prague, Czech Republic
- Stations: Praha hlavní, Praha Masarykovo, Praha-Holešovice, Praha-Libeň, Praha-Vysočany
- Website: Nové Spojení

Service
- Depot: Libeň

History
- Opened: 2010

Technical
- Track length: 28.5 km (17.7 mi)
- Track gauge: 1,435 mm (4 ft 8 1/2 in)
- Operating speed: 50–100 km/h

The Nové spojení (Czech for "New Connection", full name Nové spojení Praha hl.n., Masarykovo n. – Libeň, Vysočany, Holešovice) is a series of tunnels and bridges forming an important part of the railway network in Prague, Czech Republic. The network was constructed between 2004 and 2008 and opened in 2010. It links the two central stations, Praha hlavní and Praha Masarykovo, to Libeň, Vysočany and Holešovice stations and the start of their respective mainline corridors towards Česká Třebová, Hradec Králové and Ústí nad Labem. The construction has increased the capacity of the trunk lines serving Praha hlavní nádraží, allowing more trains to terminate there. Prior to its completion, many international trains terminated at Holešovice station, due to lack of access to the centre from the northern and eastern routes. Trains are now also able to travel at speeds of up to 100 kilometres per hour (62 mph) on the tunnel sections. The construction is also part of a larger plan to improve the sections of pan-European corridors on Czech territory.

After leaving both central stations, the electrified tracks lead through a 1.3 km-long tunnel under Vítkov hill in Žižkov, then over a series of bridges skirting the Žižkov-Libeň border leading to a large junction at Balabenka. From here, trains continue east to Vysočany and Libeň, and turn north to Holešovice station, making use of the previously existing tracks which lead to Holešovice from Libeň. The construction of Nové spojení also led to numerous improvements in road infrastructure, including a heated overbridge at Krejcárek, which replaced a level crossing.

== Construction ==
The construction was led by Skanska and also Metrostav and Subterra. The complex comprised 28.5 kilometres (17.7 mi) of new track, of which 16 kilometres (10 mi) is electrified at 3 kV DC, 43 kilometres (27 mi) of fibre-optic cable for the signalling system, and 3 kilometres (2 mi) of noise barriers. A total of 267 separate structures were built for the project. The overhead wires built on the line were specifically designed to be as unobtrusive as possible to views of the city centre.

Preliminary construction works before the project began were completed in 2002, costing approximately 260 million Czech koruna (about US$7.3 million) and included the construction of a large bridge over Seifertova street in Žižkov at the northern end of hlavní nádraží.

Following this bridge, the new track leads under an electrified double-tracked tunnel under Vítkov hill, which replaced a non-electrified one-track tunnel. This section is 1,350 metres (1,480 yd) in length and was constructed using the New Austrian Tunnelling Method as well as conventional methods. The last service to travel on the old tunnel prior to its demolition was a steam service from Prague (hlavní) to České Velenice at the Czech–Austrian border on 11 December 2005. In 2010, a cycle path was opened on the route of the old tunnel.

The 322-metre (352 yd) long double-tracked concrete bridge section at Sluncová, after the new tunnel built under Vítkov, was awarded the prize of "bridge construction of the year" (mostní dílo roku) in 2008. The construction of this section cost 262.3 million CZK. The entire project won the transport category of the Czech stavba roku (construction of the year) award in 2009.

== Future ==
A Nové spojení 2 is proposed, as a series of underground tunnels; one from the Karlín area to Praha-Smíchov railway station via the city centre, the other from Karlín looping back to nám. Bratří Synků before surfacing past Praha-Vršovice railway station. Unlike the first Nové spojení project, this will contain underground stations at Florenc, Opera, Karlovo náměstí, and Náměstí Bratří Synků.

== Gallery ==
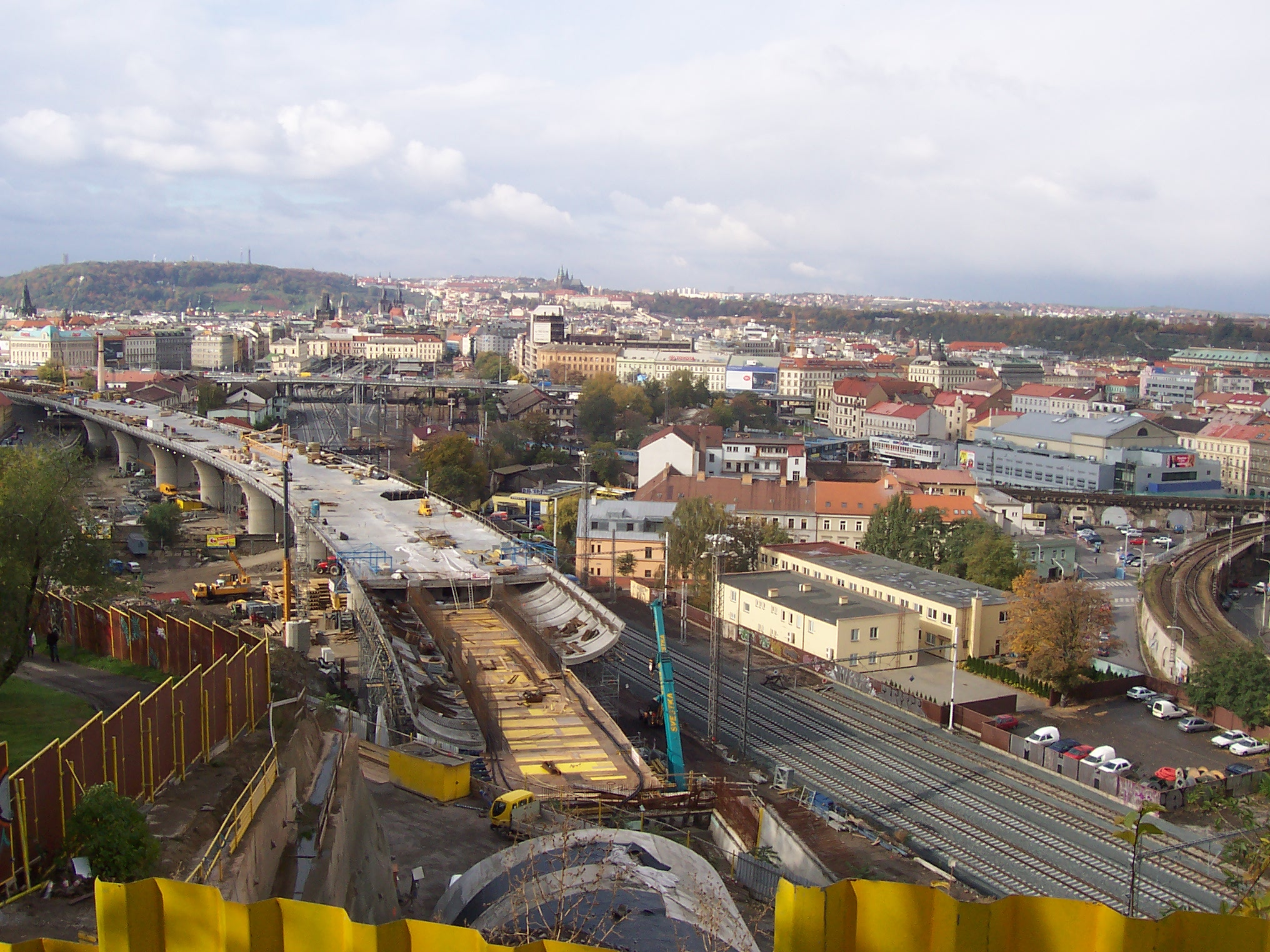
The bridge section linking Praha hlavní to the new Vítkov tunnels during construction in 2007

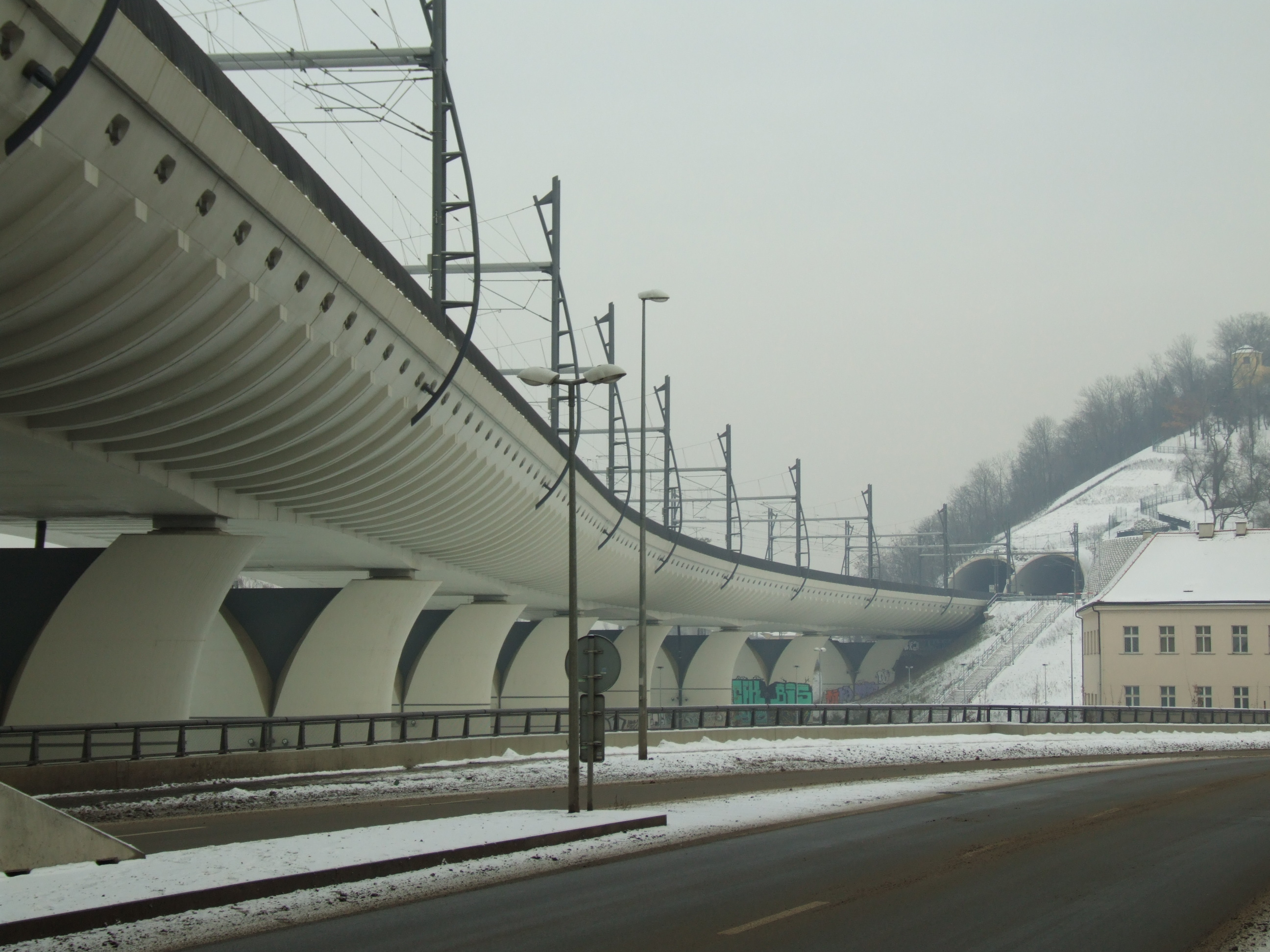
The hlavní – Vítkov bridge section in December 2010, completed

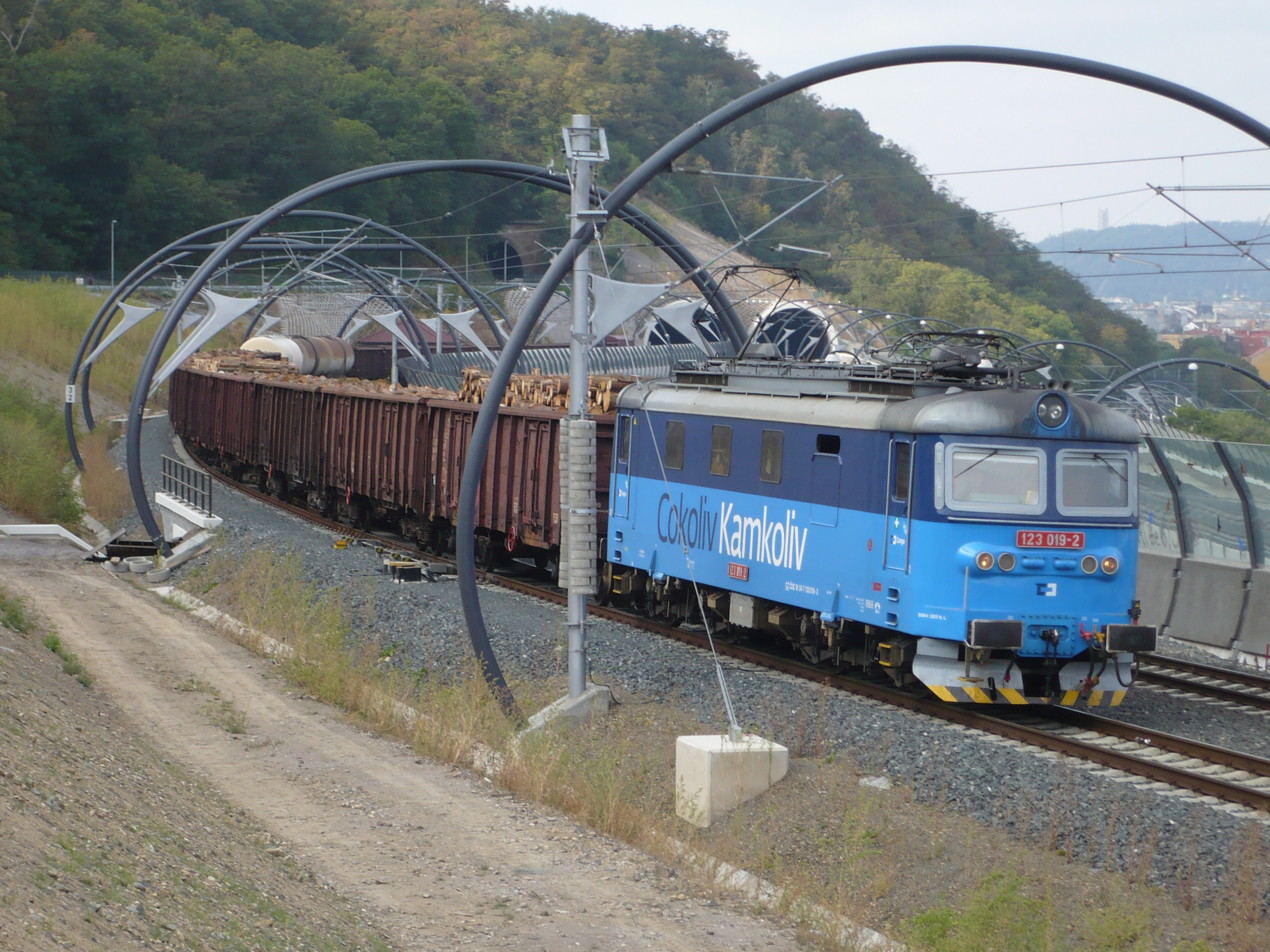
A freight train leaving the Vítkov tunnels towards Sluncová junction

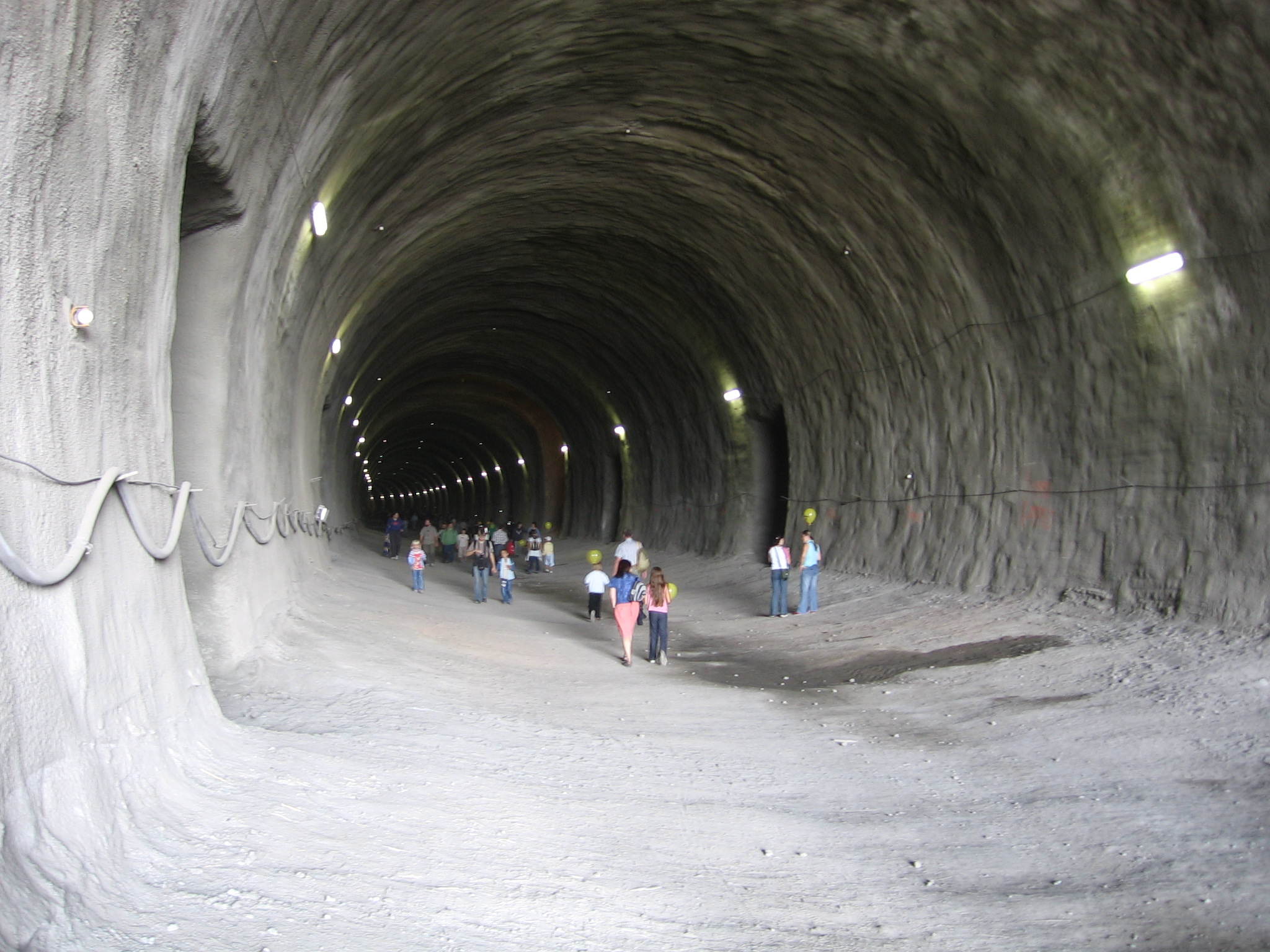
Inside the northern Vítkov tunnel during an "open day" during construction
