= Vysočanská (Prague Metro) =

Prague metro station

Coordinates: 50°06′41″N 14°30′07″E

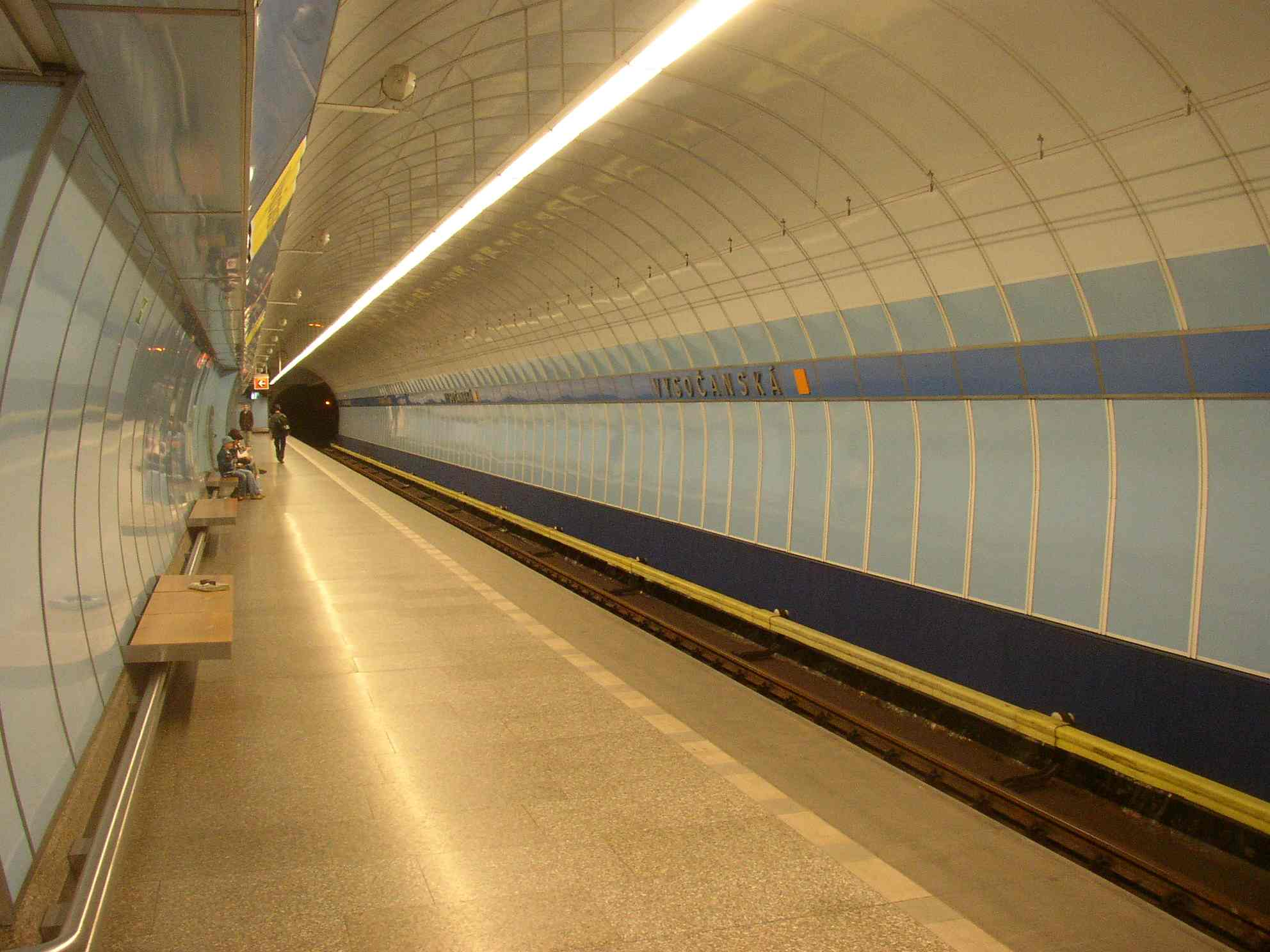

General information
- Location: Freyova street Vysočany, Prague 9 Prague; Czech Republic
- System: Prague Metro
- Platforms: 1 island platform
- Tracks: 2

Construction
- Structure type: Underground
- Depth: 3,013 m (9,885 ft)
- Accessible: Yes

Other information
- Fare zone: PID: P

History
- Opened: 8 November 1998; 27 years ago

Services
Preceding station	Prague Metro	Following station
Českomoravská toward Zličín	Line B	Kolbenova toward Černý Most
Location

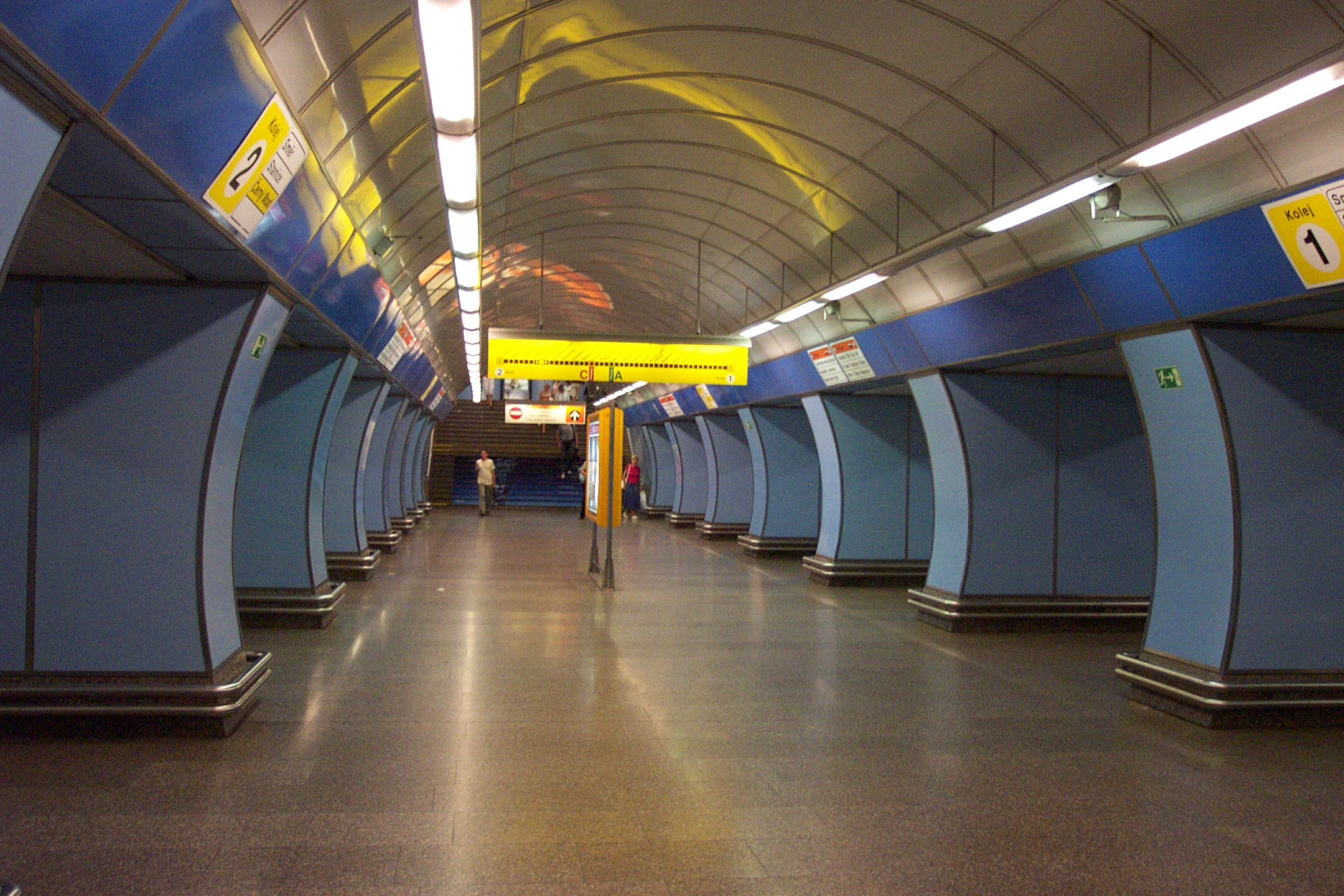
Vysočanská metro station

Vysočanská (Czech pronunciation: [ˈvɪsotʃanskaː]) is a Prague Metro station on Line B, situated in Vysočany, next to Praha-Vysočany railway station. The station was opened on 8 November 1998 as part of the extension of Line B from Českomoravská to Černý Most.
