= Praha-Libeň railway station =

Railway station in Vysočany, Czech Republic

Coordinates: 50°06′05″N 14°30′05″E

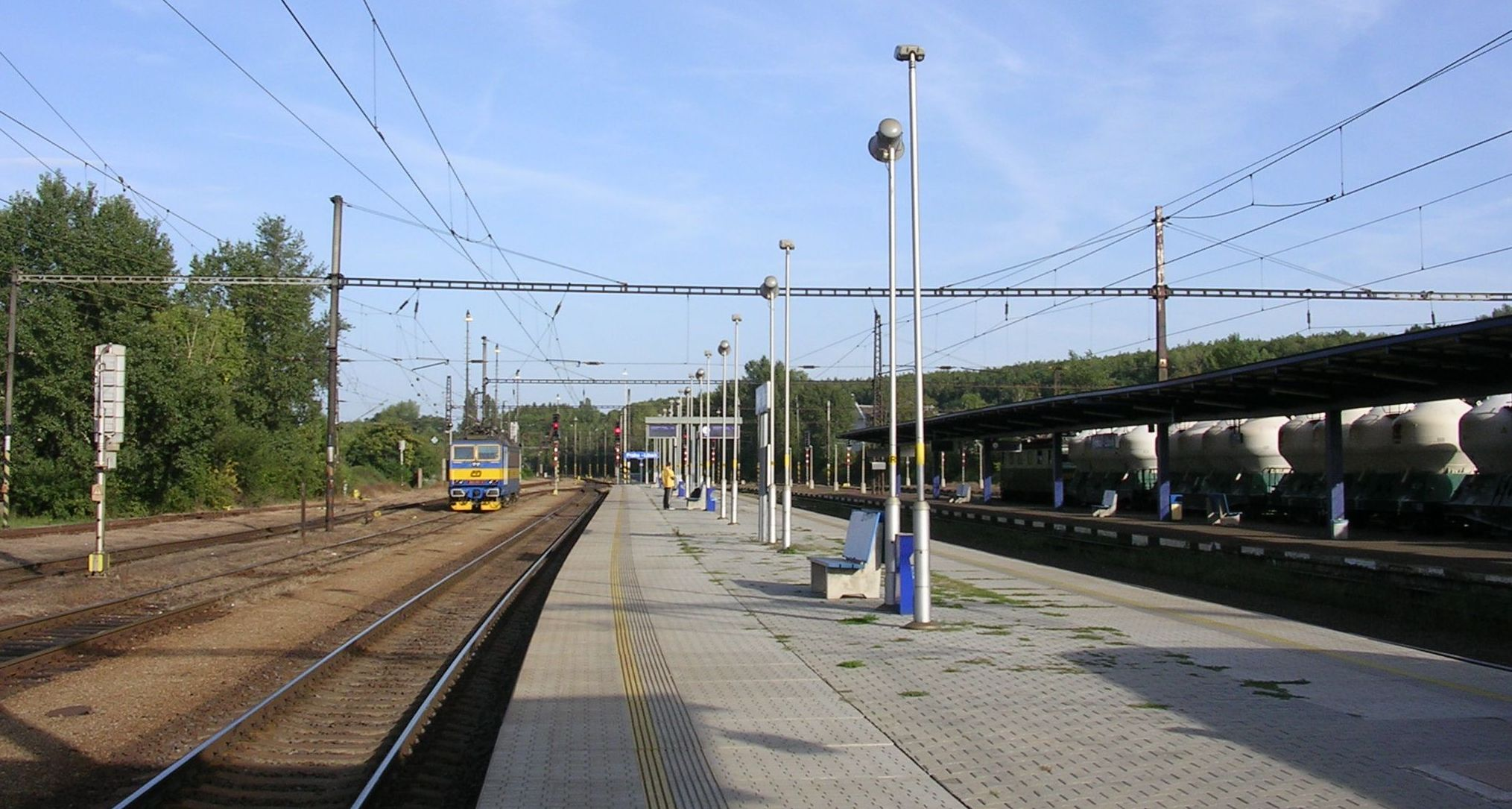
Praha-Libeň station

Praha-Libeň station concourse

Praha-Libeň railway station (Czech: Nádraží Praha-Libeň) is a mainline railway station located in the Libeň district of Prague 9. It is situated on Line 11, which links Prague to Český Brod and Kolín as well as forming part of the main railway corridor connecting the Czech capital to Brno and Olomouc. Since reconstruction of the station, which took place between 2008 and 2010 as part of the Nové spojení project, a number of international services running to and from the more central Praha hlavní nádraží now also call here. In addition to its passenger handling facilities (the station was used by 876,000 passengers in 2006) the Praha-Libeň station area is also home to a large freight yard and is an important centre for services operated by ČD Cargo.

The line from Olomouc to Prague, as first opened in 1845, passed through what was then the village of Libeň, but it was not until 1877 that a station was built – between the stations then named Praha statní nádraží (today's Masarykovo nádraží) and Běchovice – to serve the locality. In 1923 Libeň station was renamed Libeň horní nádraží (Libeň upper station) to distinguish it from the low-level station (dolní nádraží) which led to the now demolished terminus at Těšnov. In 1926 a cut-and-cover line was built under Vítkov hill linking Libeň station to Praha hlavní nádraží.

In the late 1970s the station was modernised and shortly afterwards a new link was built to Praha-Holešovice railway station, intended to serve the international services which the two central stations no longer had the capacity to handle.

The station is situated within walking distance of the O2 Arena, and thus played a key role in the infrastructure provided for the 2004 IIHF World Championship. Libeň station is not connected to the Prague Metro, but is served by buses and trams operating as part of the city's public transport system.

== Services ==
Preceding station	České dráhy	Following station
Praha hl.n. toward Praha-Smíchov or terminus	Regional fast trains	Kolín toward Pardubice or Hradec Králové
Praha hl.n. terminus	Regional fast trains	Kolín toward Havlíčkův Brod

Preceding station	Esko Prague	Following station
Praha Masarykovo nádraží Terminus	S1	Praha-Kyje towards Český Brod, Poříčany or Kolín
Praha hl.n. towards Řevnice or Beroun	S7	Praha-Kyje towards Úvaly
