= Vysočany =

- Administrative District of Prague
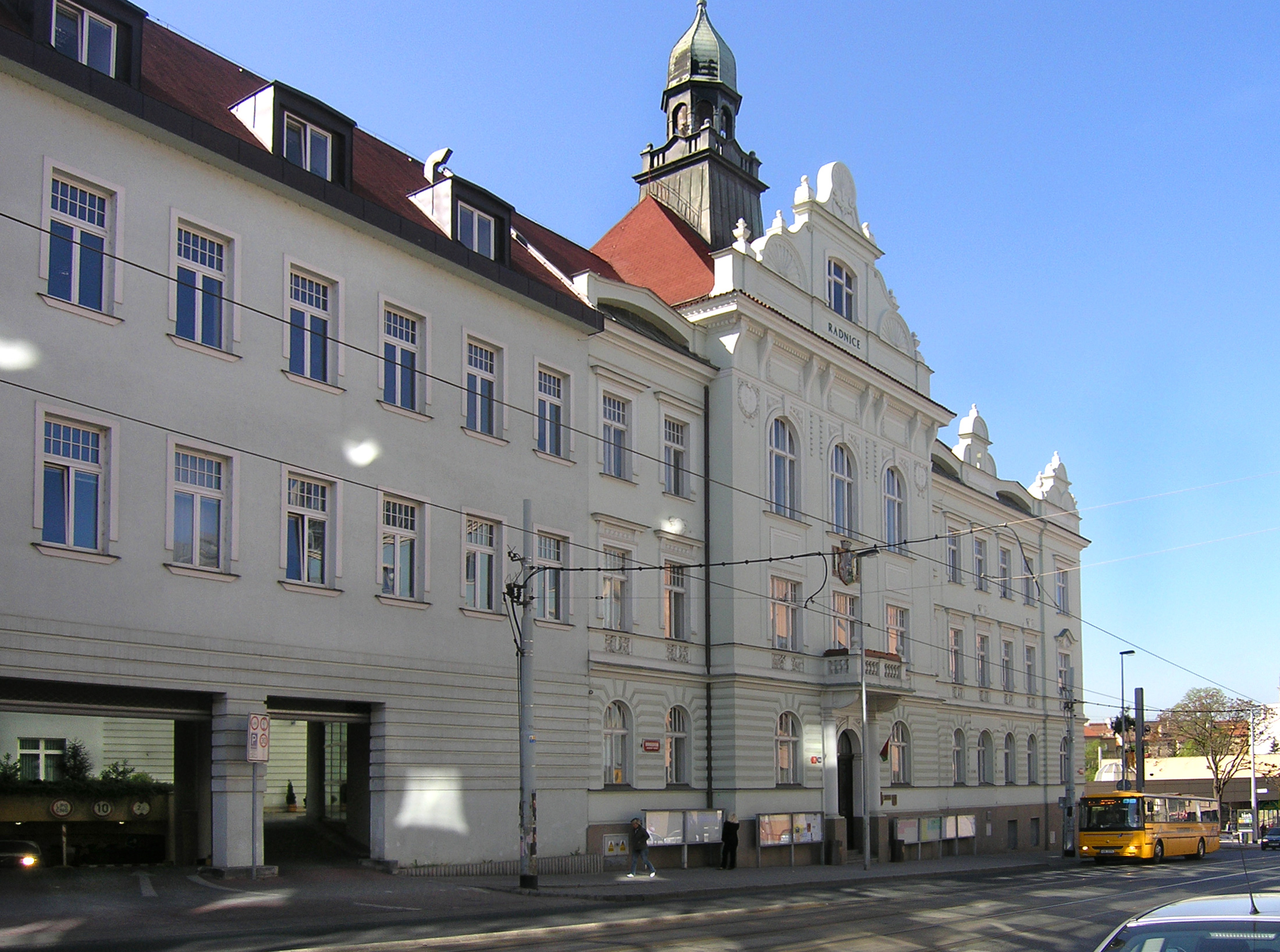
- Prague 9 town hall in Vysočany

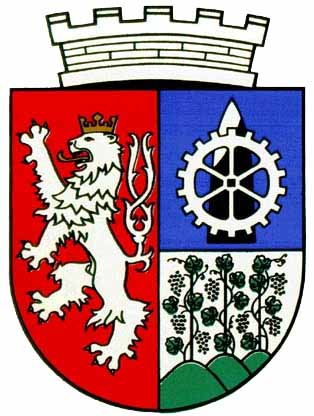
- Coat of arms

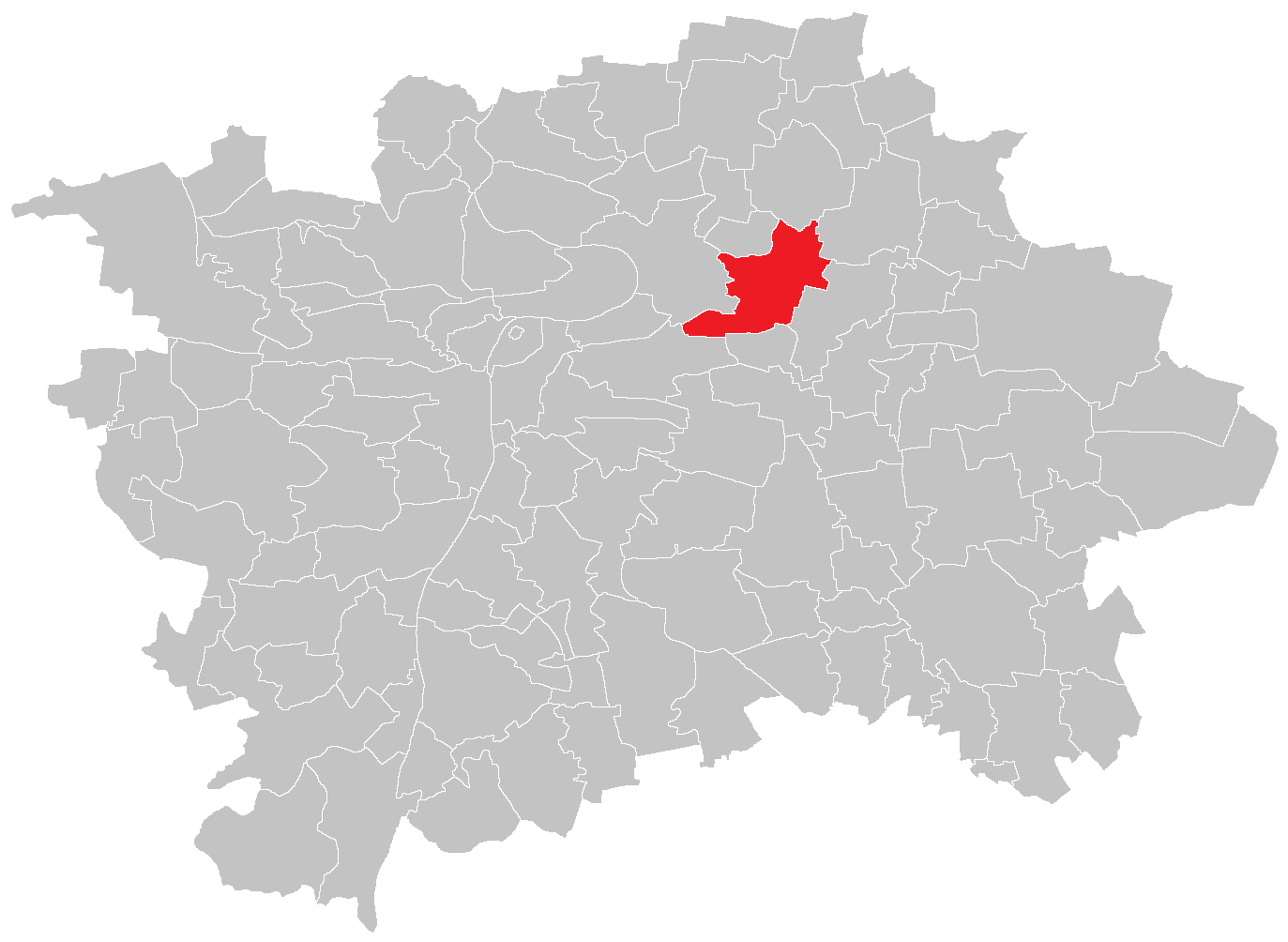
- Location of Vysočany in Prague
- Coordinates: 50°6′45″N 14°29′43″E
- Country: Czech Republic
- Region: Prague
- Established: 1902

Area
  - Total: 6.07 km^{2} (2.34 sq mi)

Population (2021)
  - Total: 17,465
  - Density: 2,880/km^{2} (7,450/sq mi)
- Time zone: UTC+1 (CET)
  - Summer (DST): UTC+2 (CEST)
- Postal code: 190 00
- Website: http://www.praha9.cz

Vysočany (German: Wissotschan) is a part of Prague in the Prague 9 administrative district (partly in Prague 3), Czech Republic. It lays in the eastern part of Prague around the valley with Rokytka river.History

- The first recorded information about Vysočany is from 1115 when the duke Vladislav I. gave Vysočany vineyards to Kladruby monastery.
- In 1896 - Emil Kolben - important Czech engineer and entrepreneur (former employee and friend of Thomas Edison) founded its factory which later became the famous ČKD. This strongly influenced Vysočany as a heavily industrial district of Prague.
- In the year 1902 - the emperor Franz Joseph I of Austria awarded Vysočany with the title of city and the right to use its coat of arms.
- 1911 - Vysočany Town Hall was built
- In 1922 - Vysočany became part of Prague.
- In 1939 - after the Nazi invasion of Prague. The majority of industrial production had to be refocused on military production to support Nazi-Germany war
- In 1942 - several families from Vysočany were involved in the Operation Anthropoid (assassination of Reinhard Heydrich)
- In 1945 - during the end of World War II the district was heavily damaged during the Bombing of Prague. The targets were factories which were forced to produce military material.
- In 1968 - after the invasion of Russian armies - there was a special convention of the Czechoslovak Communist Party held in Vysočany which strongly condemned the invasion of the Soviet armies.
- Since 1990s - the new era after Velvet Revolution saw Vysočany transforming from heavily industrial district to new modern residential part of Prague. Big part of construction is focused on the "brown-fields" after former factories.

== Infrastructure ==
- Vysočany has 2 metro stations on the line B: Vysočanská and Kolbenova.
- 2 train stations (Praha-Vysočany and Praha-Libeň).
- The oldest airport in Prague Kbely lies partly in Vysočany.

== Demographics ==
Historical population

Year	Pop.	±%
1869	1,766	—
1880	2,334	+32.2%
1890	3,329	+42.6%
1900	4,406	+32.4%
1910	6,896	+56.5%

Year	Pop.	±%
1921	8,554	+24.0%
1930	15,762	+84.3%
1950	18,207	+15.5%
1961	17,202	−5.5%
1970	13,018	−24.3%

Year	Pop.	±%
1980	10,352	−20.5%
1991	8,203	−20.8%
2001	8,019	−2.2%
2011	15,219	+89.8%
2021	17,465	+14.8%

Source: Censuses

== Interesting facts ==
- The tallest residential building in the Czech Republic Rezidence Eliška is in Vysočany.
- Vineyard Máchalka is the only one left in the almost 1000-year history of vine production in Vysočany. It was renewed in 1998.
- Part of the Pragovka factory was rebuilt to an artist/community center
- The largest flea market in Prague is in Vysočany district in the U Elektry street.
- O2 Arena (Prague) with the shopping mall Galerie Harfa and Harfa Business District is generally considered as Vysočany although officially lies in Libeň district.
