= Praha-Čakovice railway station =

Railway station in Prague, Czech Republic

Praha-Čakovice
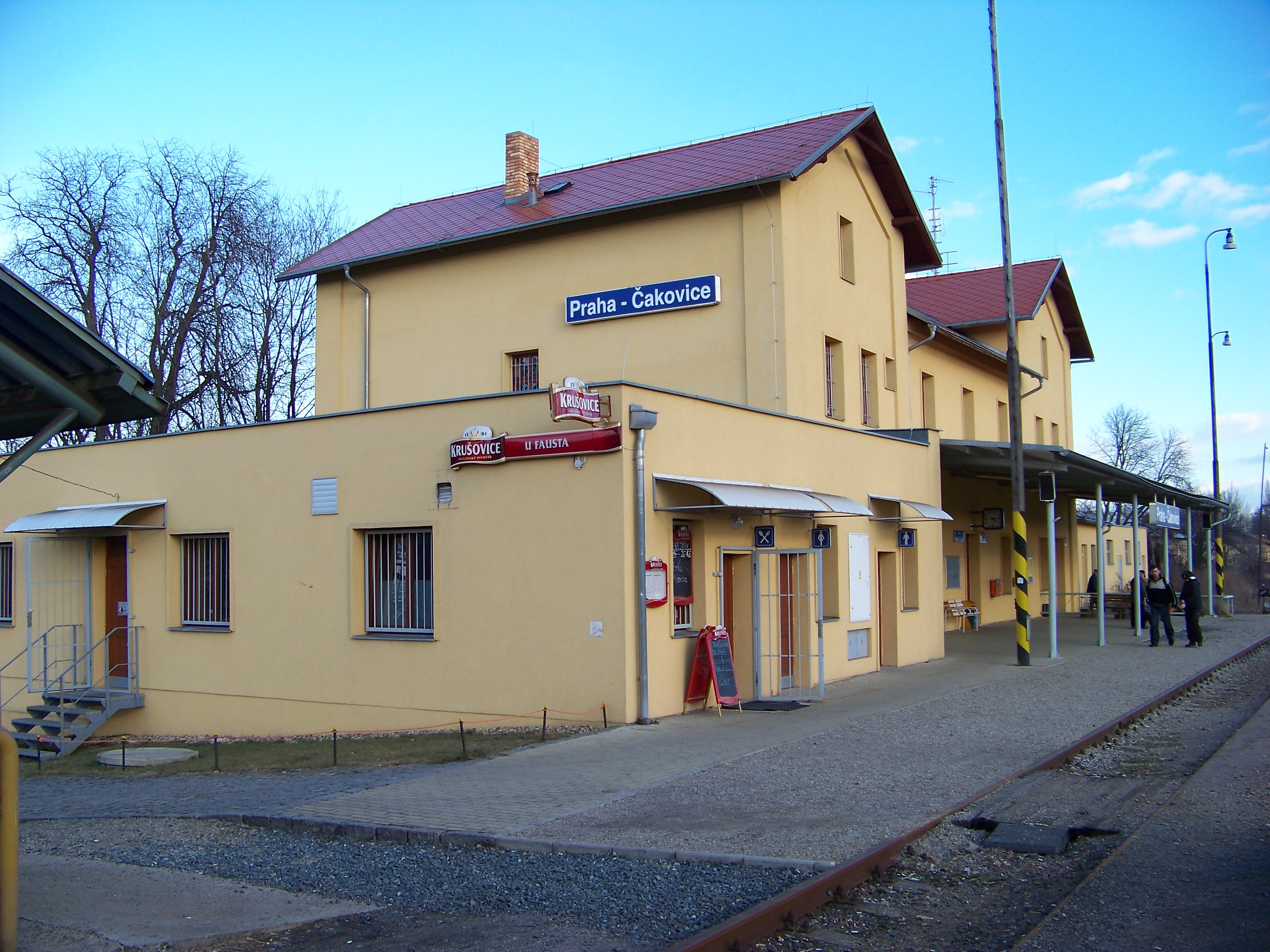
- Čakovice station building

General information
- Coordinates: 50°08′57″N 14°31′11″E
- Line: 070 (Praha - Turnov)

Other information
- Station code: 54573360
- Fare zone: PID: B

Services
| Preceding station | Esko Prague | Following station |
|---|---|---|
| Praha-Kbely towards Praha hl.n. | S3 | Hovorčovice towards Všetaty, Mělník or Mladá Boleslav město |
| Praha-Vysočany towards Praha hl.n. | R21 | Neratovice towards Tanvald |
| Praha-Kbely towards Praha Masarykovo nádraží | S34 | Terminus |
Location

Praha-Čakovice railway station (Czech: železniční stanice Praha-Čakovice) is a station located in Čakovice, in the northern outer suburbs of Prague, on line 070 between Prague and Turnov. It serves as a passing loop on a mainly single-tracked section of the line for lines S3 and R21 of the Esko Prague system. In 2009 the station building was refurbished. In 2018, the station was proposed as a future terminus station of Line C of the Prague Metro.
