= Praha Masarykovo nádraží =

Railway station in Prague, Czech Republic

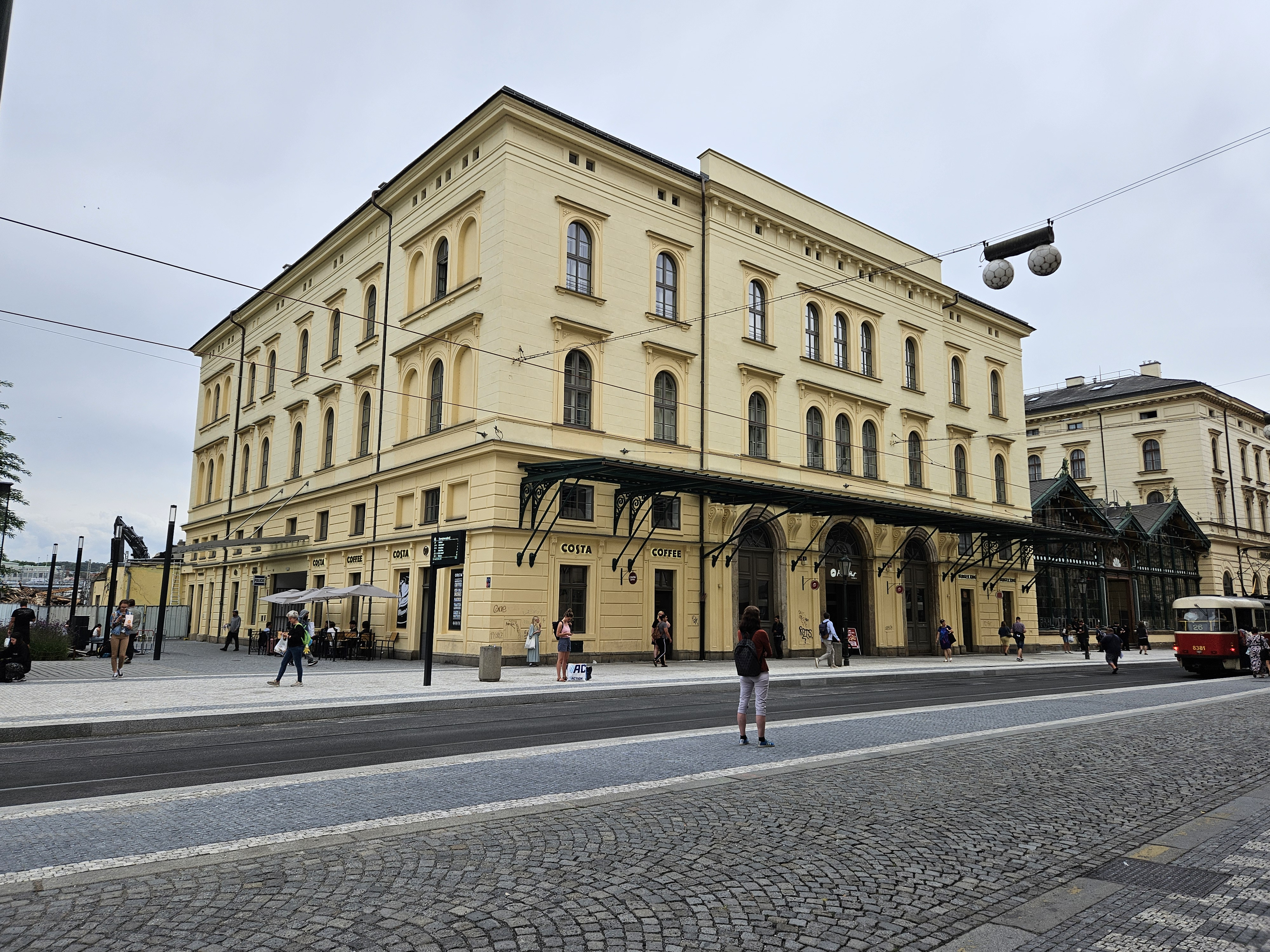
- Masaryk railway station

General information
- Location: Prague, Havlíčkova 1028/5; Hybernská 1014/13
- Coordinates: 50.088°N 14.433°E
- Owner: Správa železnic
- Platforms: 4 (7)
- Tracks: 7
- Connections: B

Construction
- Architect: Jan Perner; Antonín Jüngling

Other information
- Station code: 54572362
- Fare zone: PID: P

History
- Opened: 20 August 1845; 181 years ago
- Electrified: 1926–1928
Location

Praha Masarykovo nádraží (English: Prague Masaryk railway station) is a terminal railway station near Republic Square (náměstí Republiky) in the New Town area of Prague, Czech Republic.

It was the first railway station in the city to serve steam trains, and the second oldest railway station in Prague (the first is Praha-Dejvice, formerly Bruska on the Lány Horse-drawn Railway). The station was designed by Antonín Jüngling and came into service in 1845.

During the Prague uprising against German occupation in 1945, the station was captured by the Waffen-SS on 8 May and 53 surrendered resistance fighters and non-combatants were massacred.

Nowadays the station only serves regional and suburban trains, because the larger Praha hlavní nádraží does not have enough capacity. In 2010 it served 48,838 trains and 9.6 million passengers. The station is currently being reconstructed, and will become the terminus of the planned railway connection with Václav Havel Airport Prague.

== Names ==
Since it opened in 1845, Masaryk Railway Station has had the following names:

- 1845–1862 Praha (German: Prag) - "Prague"
- 1862–1919 Praha státní nádraží (German: Prag Staatsbahnhof) - "Prague State Station"
- 1919–1940 Praha Masarykovo nádraží (German: Prag Masarykbahnhof) - Prague Masaryk Station
- 1940–1945 Praha Hybernské nádraží (German: Prag Hibernerbahnhof) - Prague Hibernia Station, the station is on Hybernská street
- 1945–1952 Praha Masarykovo nádraží
- 1953–1990 Praha střed - Prague Central
- March 1990– Praha Masarykovo nádraží

For much of its existence, the station has been named after the founder of Czechoslovakia, Tomáš Garrigue Masaryk.

== Services ==
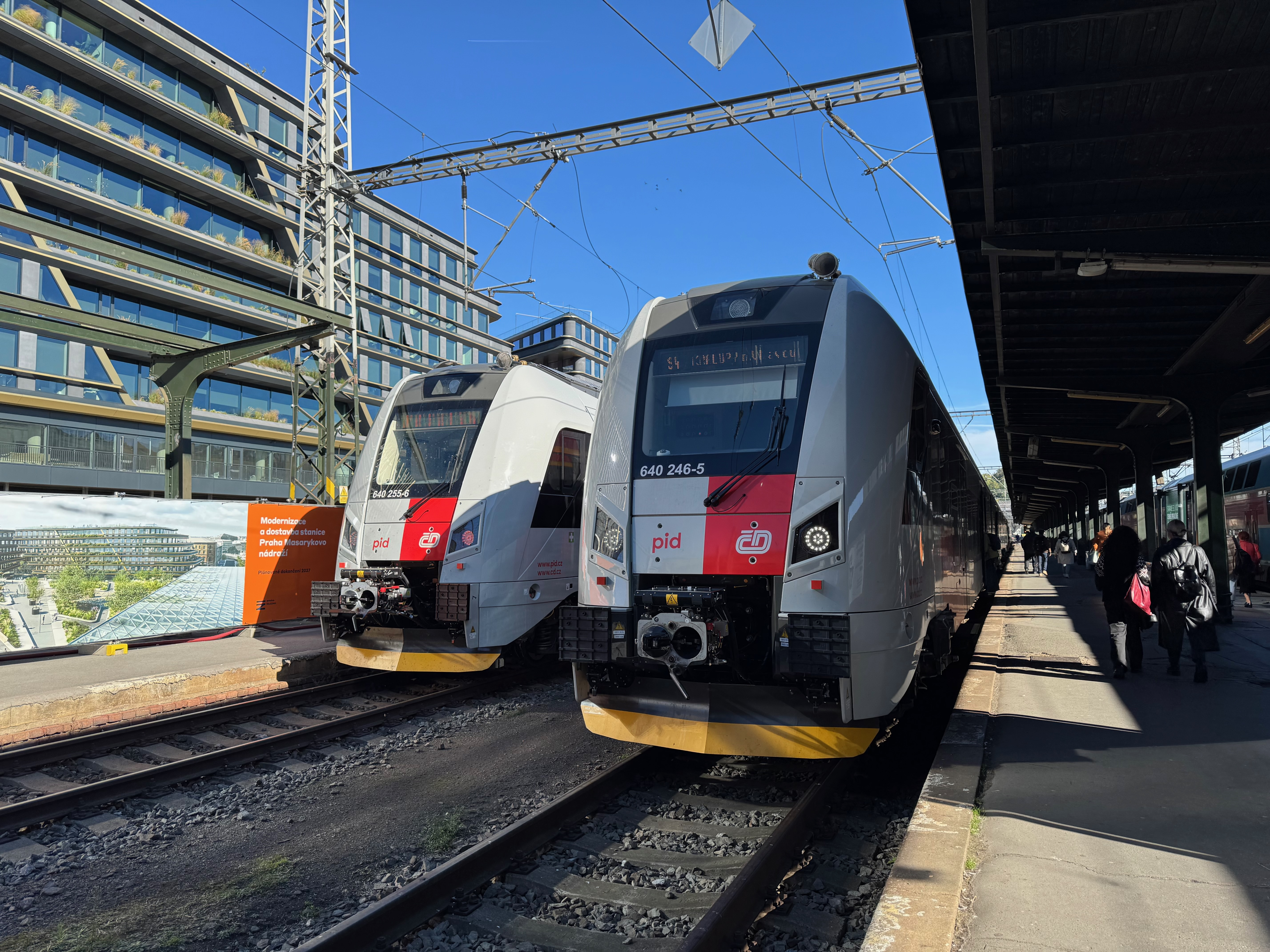
RegioPanter EMU at Prague Masarykovo nádraží

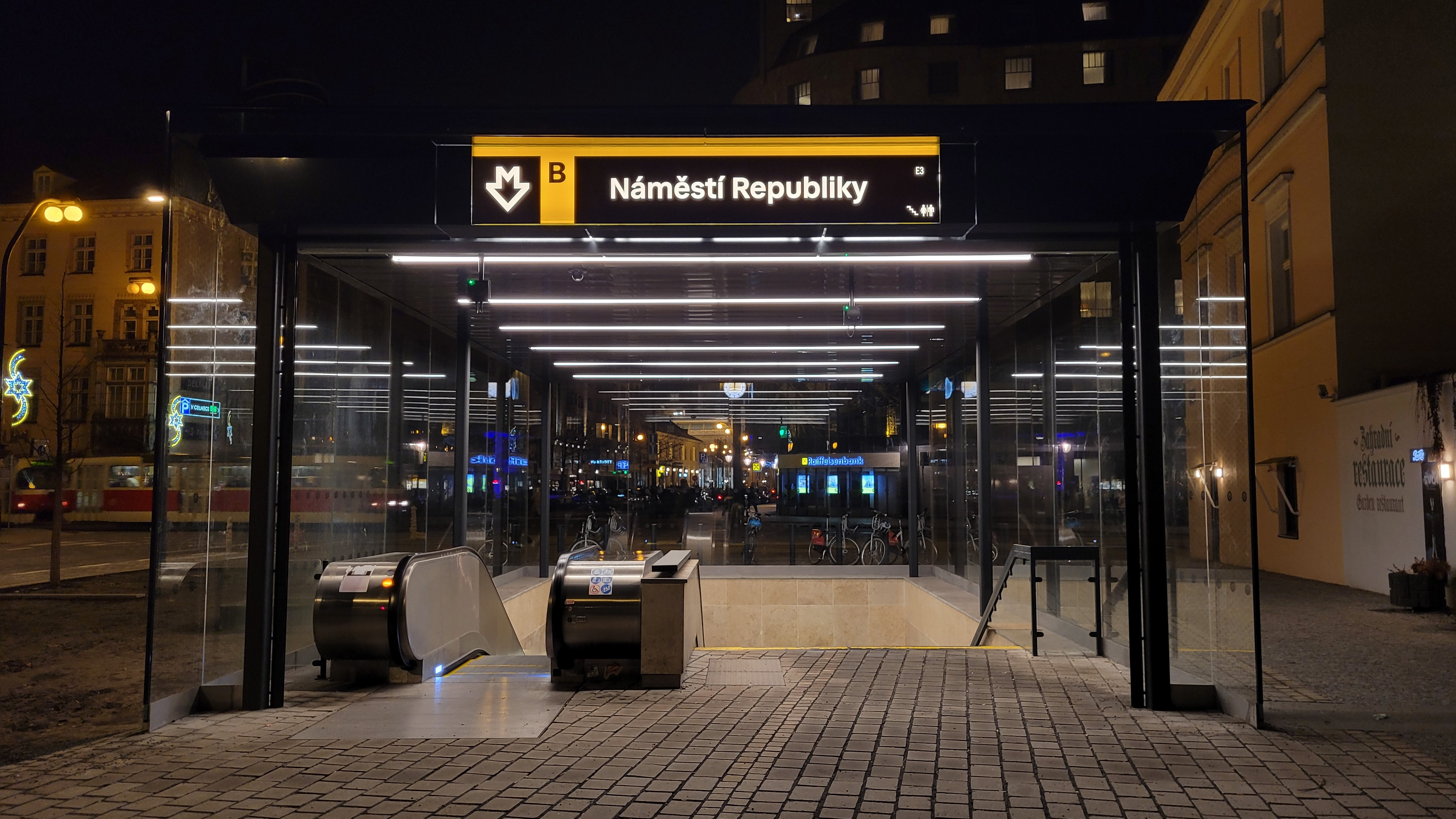
Náměstí Republiky metro station on Line B, serving Prague Masarykovo nádraží.

Preceding station	Esko Prague	Following station
Terminus	S1	Praha-Libeň towards Český Brod, Poříčany or Kolín
Terminus	S2	Praha-Vysočany towards Nymburk hl.n. or Kolín
Terminus	S22	Praha-Vysočany towards Milovice
Terminus	S34	Praha-Vysočany towards Praha-Čakovice
Terminus	S4	Praha-Bubny towards Kralupy nad Vltavou or Hněvice
Terminus	S5	Praha-Bubny towards Kladno
Terminus	S54	Praha-Bubny towards Středokluky or Slaný
Terminus	R24	Praha-Bubny towards Rakovník
Terminus	R45	Praha-Bubny towards Kladno

== Future development ==
In 2012, the reconstruction of the Masaryk Railway Station building began, led by the company Penta, which had purchased the surrounding land. The station was leased to the company for long-term rent as part of the reconstruction contract. The renovation included the roofing of the hall, restrooms, facade, and non-residential areas. New ticket counters were built closer to the platforms. The concept of the reconstruction was designed by architect Marek Tichý.

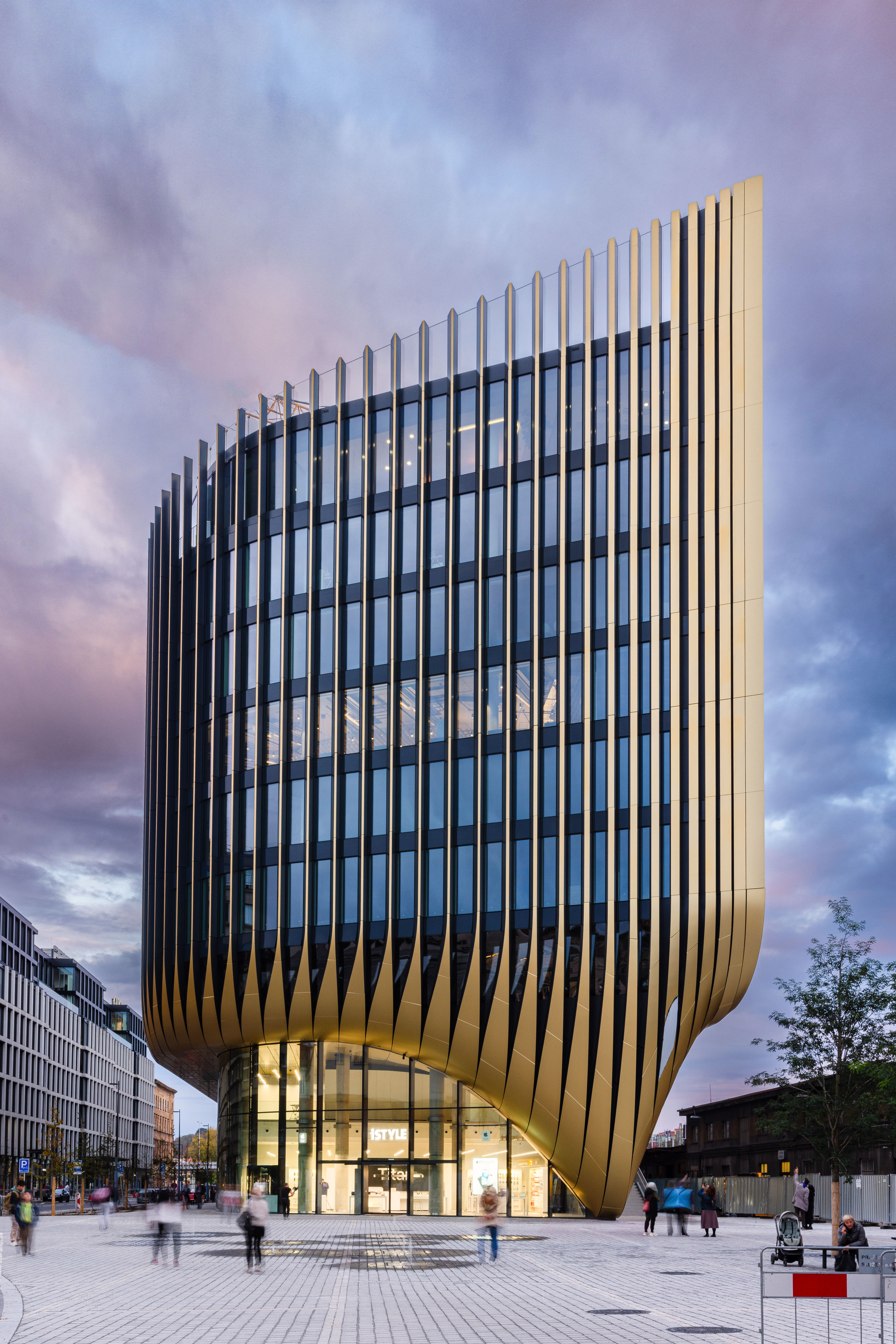
New Masaryčka building in Prague (2023)

Near the station, on the site of former service and technical areas, a modern administrative and commercial center is being constructed in several phases. The "Masaryčka Connects" project is a significant urban regeneration effort in the centre of Prague, transforming the city's first railway station, into a modern transport hub. In 2015–2016, Zaha Hadid supervised the conceptual design of a new mixed-use building that replaced a formal cargo terminal.The construction took place in 2020–2023, as some delay was caused by negotiations with heritage protection authorities.

As part of the complete renovation of the station, a new vestibule for waiting passengers will be constructed. The plan includes partial platform over the tracks, which will connect the areas of Náměstí Republiky and Florenc with Žižkov, and also create a new connection between the eastern ends of the platforms with these areas, the Florenc bus station, and the metro line C. Escalators, stairs, and elevators from the floor will lead to the individual platforms. In front of Masaryk Station, near one of the exits of metro line B, a new square was created.

Masaryk Railway Station in Prague will also be the terminal station of a planned railway connection to Václav Havel Airport and further to Kladno.

In the former engine shed of the station, the National Technical Museum is preparing a railway exhibition.
