= Kolín railway station =

Railway station in Czech Republic

Kolín
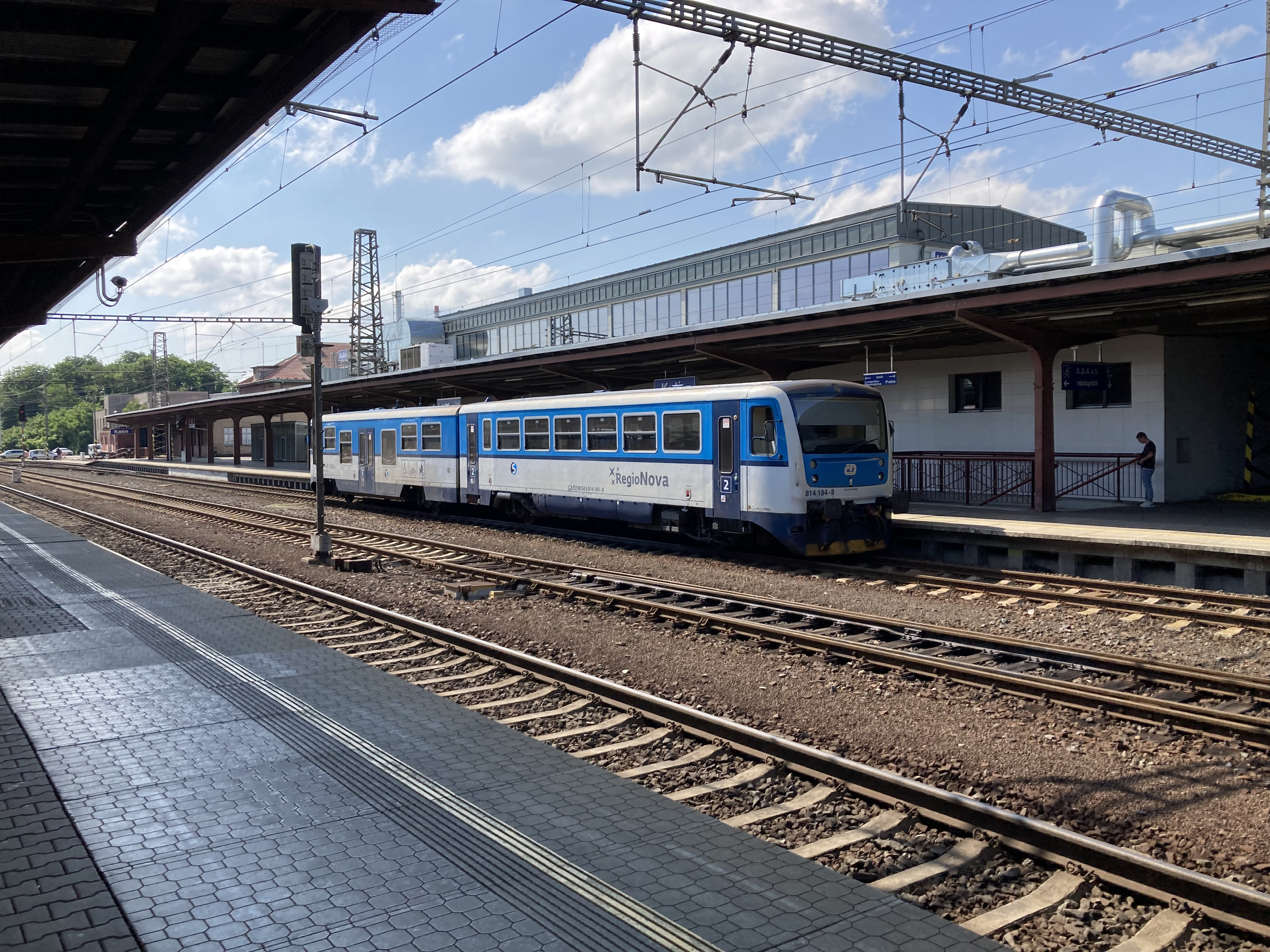
- Kolín railway station

General information
- Location: 280 02 Kolín; Czech Republic
- Coordinates: 50°1′31″N 15°12′49″E
- Owner: Czech Republic
- Lines: Praha - Česká Třebová (010); Kolín – Ledečko (014); Kolín – Havlíčkův Brod (230); Kolín – Ledečko (014); Praha - Lysá nad Labem - Kolín (231)
- Platforms: 5(10)
- Tracks: 16

Construction
- Architect: Anton Jüngling; Jan Perner; Carl Schlimp; Vladimír Weiss

Other information
- Station code: 54534149
- Fare zone: PID: 6

History
- Opened: 20 August 1845; 181 years ago
- Rebuilt: 1858; 1972–1979; 1938–1939; 2006-2009
- Electrified: 1960–1963
Location
- Location within Czech Republic

Kolín railway station (Czech: Železniční stanice Kolín) is a railway station in the city of Kolín on the Elbe river in Central Bohemian Region, Czech Republic.

== History ==
=== First and second building ===
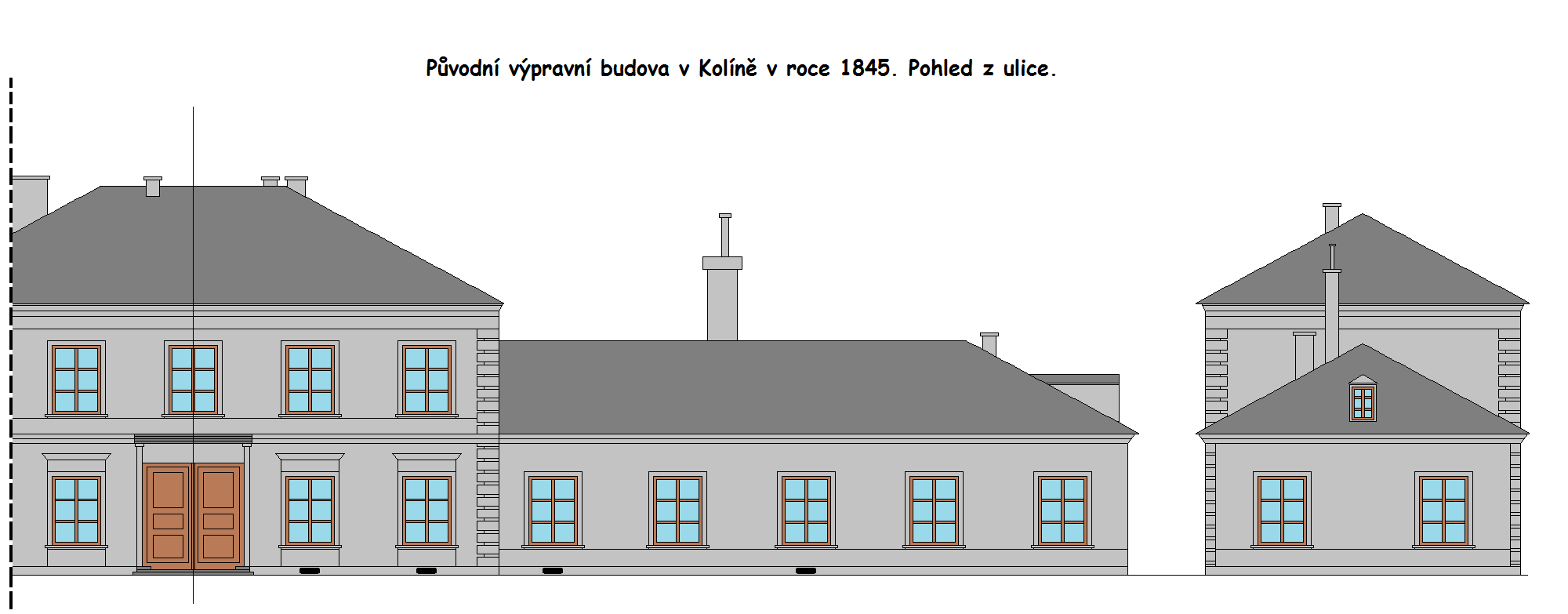
First railway station building designed by Anton Jüngling

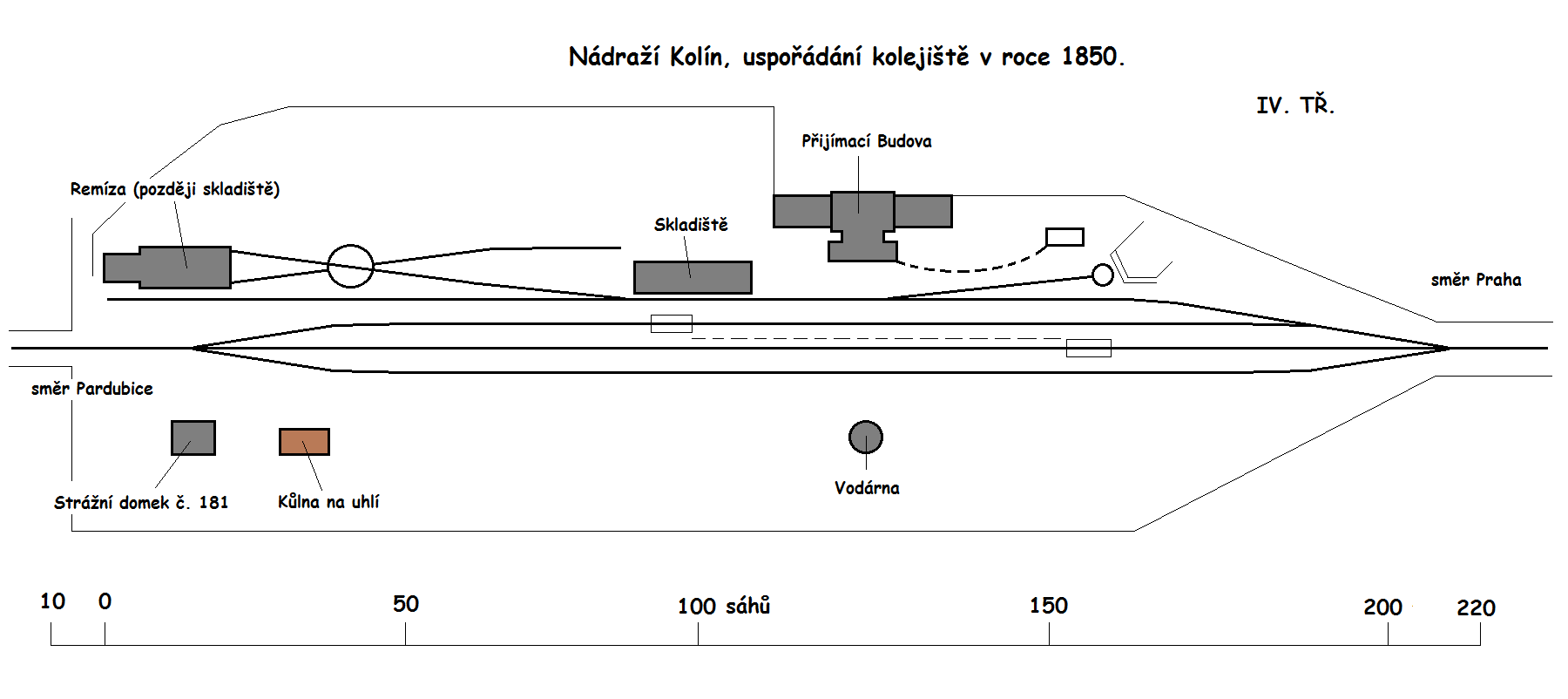
Track layout in 1850

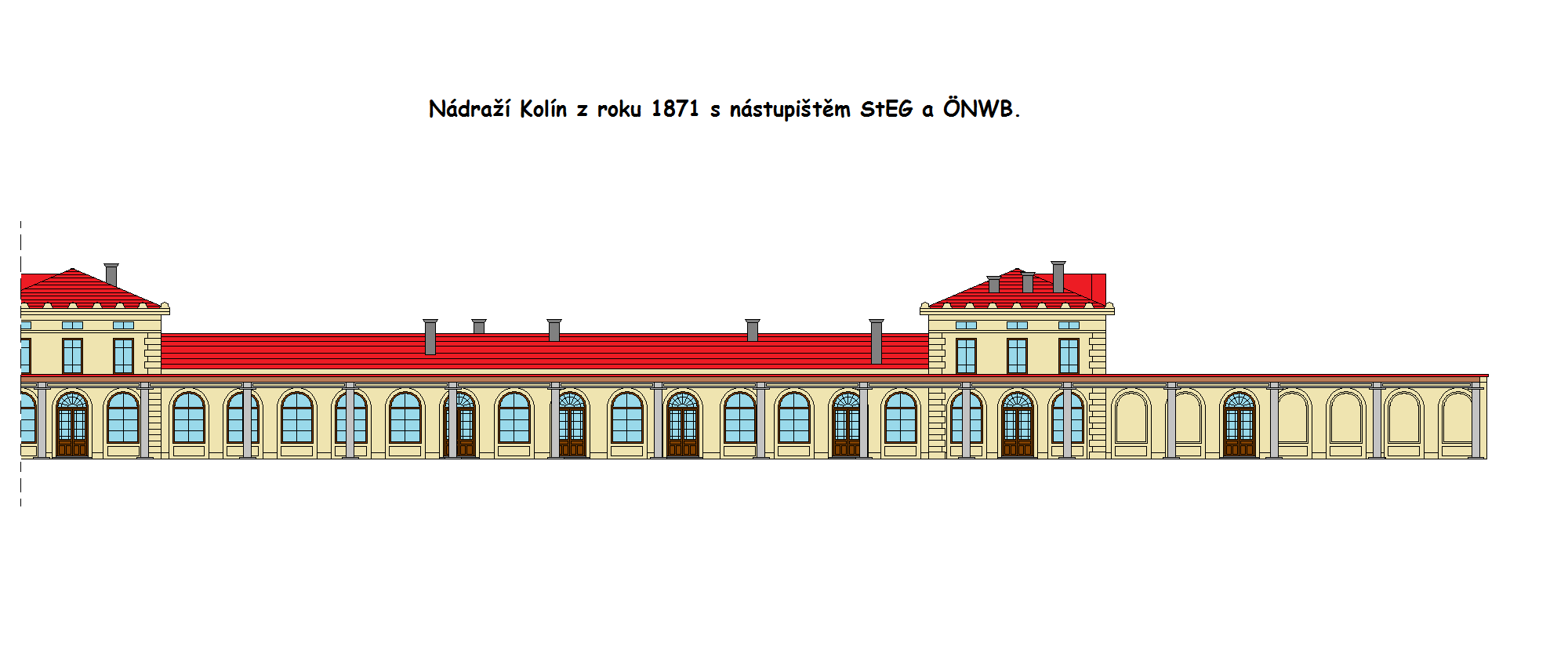
Second railway station building designed by Carl Schlimp

The first station in Kolín was built according to the design of chief engineer Anton Jüngling, who in 1844 submitted for approval a construction project with a budget of 40,526 florins. The Klein Brothers Entrepreneurship began with the construction in early 1845. Against the original budget, the Klein Brothers Entrepreneurship offered a discount of 2½ percent. Kolín station was not fully appreciated at its beginnings, although its location near the Elbe was indicative of the industrial boom of the city. The station was built near the Elbe on the embankment, which was protected by a stone pavement in case of flood ranged from 2 to 3 fathoms. It was a small railway station with leight of 200 fathoms with three tracks, classified as IV. category station with order number 21.

The reception building was built of bricks, the one-storey center of which was adjacent to two ground-level wings. It was 25 fathoms long, 6 wide. The roof of the building was covered with an English slate. Towards the track area there was a ground-floor annex that was covered with sheet metal. On the ground floor of the building was an engineer's office, a post office, a shelter of the pump servicer, the dispatcher and switchman flats. In the annex there was a waiting room with a cash desk. The original reception building survived at the same place for about 85 years, though it did not serve the original purpose later. Opposite the reception building behind the rails, a water tower was built with 5 fathoms deep well. From there the hand pump pumped water into the tank in the tower. The water was then led to two water cranes, from which the steam locomotive was pumping water. A steam pump was located in Pardubice. At the station, a carriage house was also built for two backup machines with a length of 20 and a width of 6 fathoms. However, this house was soon replaced by a warehouse.

The ceremonial opening of the Emperor Ferdinand Northern Railway took place on 20 August 1845. The first train arrived in the afternoon, was towed by locomotives "Prague" and "Olomouc". A locomotive "Bohemia" rode as a vanguard for five minutes, accompanied by the chief engineer Jan Perner. The stops of the ceremonial train at the small railway stations was shortened to the minimum. Even though battalions were flying in Kolín, the music was played in the presence of the honorary division of the Palombini Regiment. Even at the opening ceremony, the station was not fully appreciated by the locals. The Kutná Hora citizens welcomed the solemn train in Záboří nad Labem, according to the locals with the joy that the track was not run through their town. On 1 September 1845 passenger transport started, and a freight transport followed a month later.

Prior to 1855, a private siding to the Coal Company of Emperor Ferdinand I was built at the station. This company also ran the shops in the stations. In 1858, a magnificent rebuilding has changed station over time to a huge railway junction. In 1861, the original water tower was replaced by a new one. Hand water pump carrying water directly from Elbe was replaced by a steam one. Both pumps, however, did not survive a major reconstruction in 1871. In 1869, Imperial Royal Privileged Austrian State Railway Company (StEG) and Austrian Northwestern Railway (ÖNWB) companies agreed on two separate railway stations adjacent to each other with a newly built departure building, because of intersection of ÖNWB new line. The new building was designed by ÖNWB architect Carl Schlimp. It was a ground-level tract, ending with vertical winged wings. On both sides the covered platforms were adjacent to the building, the building was situated in an island position between the two StEG and ÖNWB stations. The southern platform was operated by StEG, the northern one by ÖNWB.

The junction of the Austrian northwest railroad between Golčův Jeníkov and Kolín was put into operation on 6 December 1869, to Mladá Boleslav on 29 October 1870. In 1871, the construction of the second railway from Pečky to Kolín took place, in 1885 railway line from Přelouč to Kolín was led. According to the timetable of the northern branch of StEG from 1868, the train Nr. 4 with regular departure from Kolín at 9:28 arrived in Pardubice at 10:38. In the opposite direction, train Nr. 3 with regular departure from Kolín at 5:48 arrived in Prague at 7:37. After the completion of the new reception building, the original building served just for residential purposes. Between 1872 and 1886 the station was named New Kolín.

In 1908, the construction of the second track of the Austrian northwest railroad from Kolín to Sedlec u Kutné Hory (current location of Kutná Hora main railway station) was launched, a year later to Velký Osek. Original IV. class railway station had suddenly become an important traffic junction. At that time there was an industrial boom and within a few decades the Kolín town was transformed into an industrial city with many factories, even though the railway station was not fully appreciated at first. In 1909 Austrian private railway companies ÖNWB and StEG were nationalized by the Austrian Federal Railways company, which became the sole owner of Kolín station. Before the First World War, lever frame system was installed in the station. In the stations in the direction of Prague and Záboří nad Labem was installed a gate semiautomatic block.

=== Third building ===
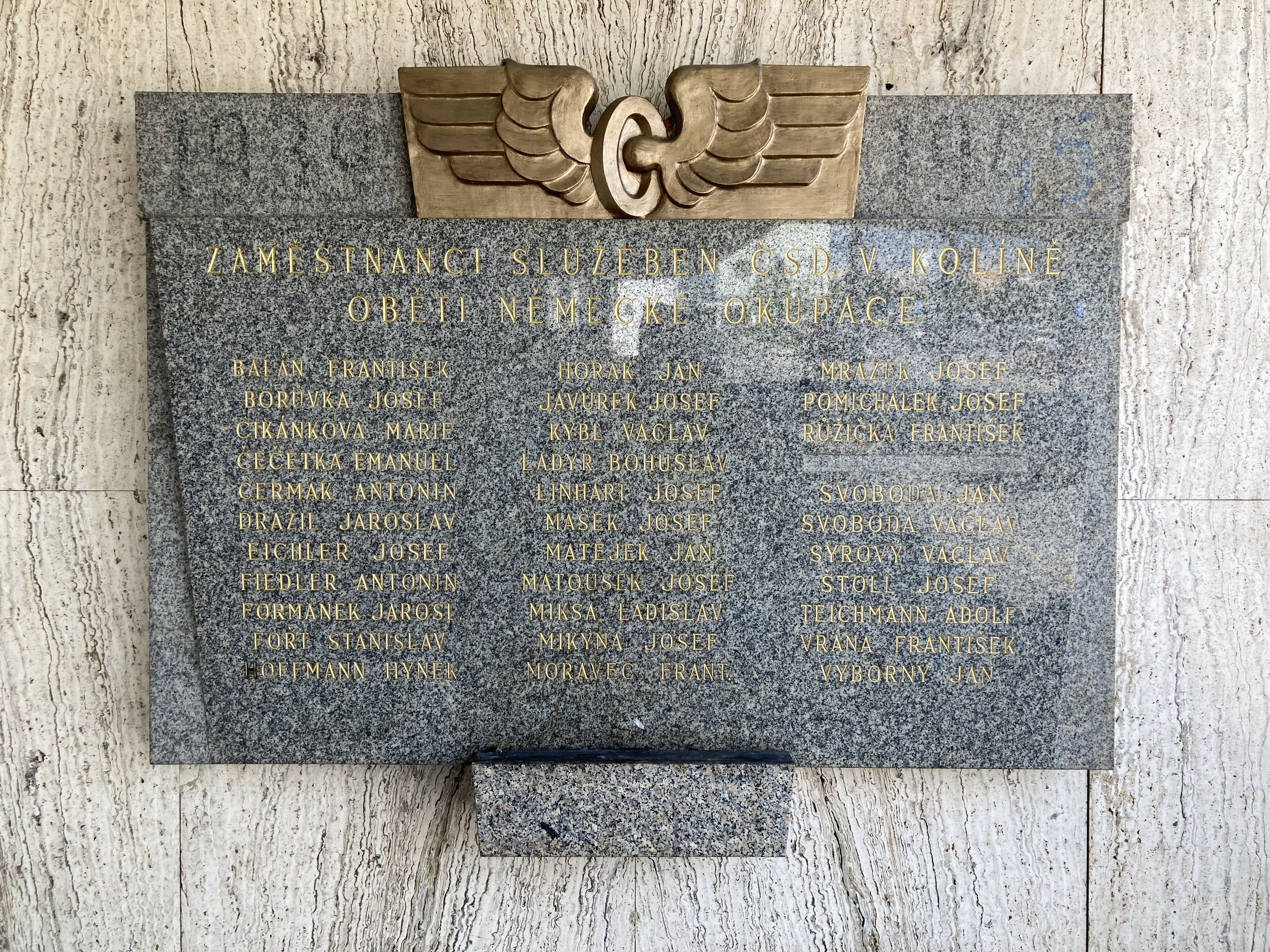
Memorial to the victims of the Second World War among railway employees

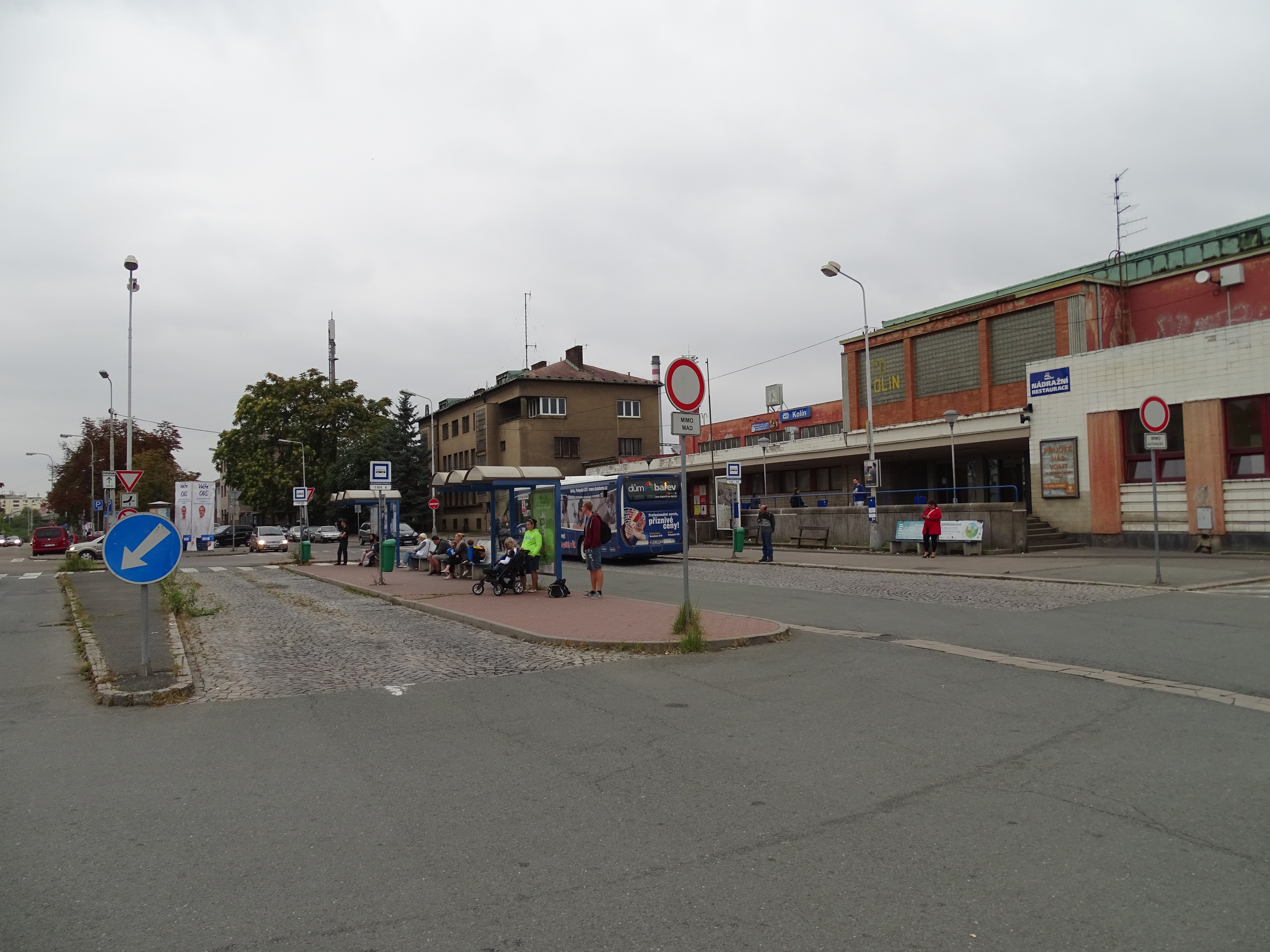
Functionalist station finished in 1939

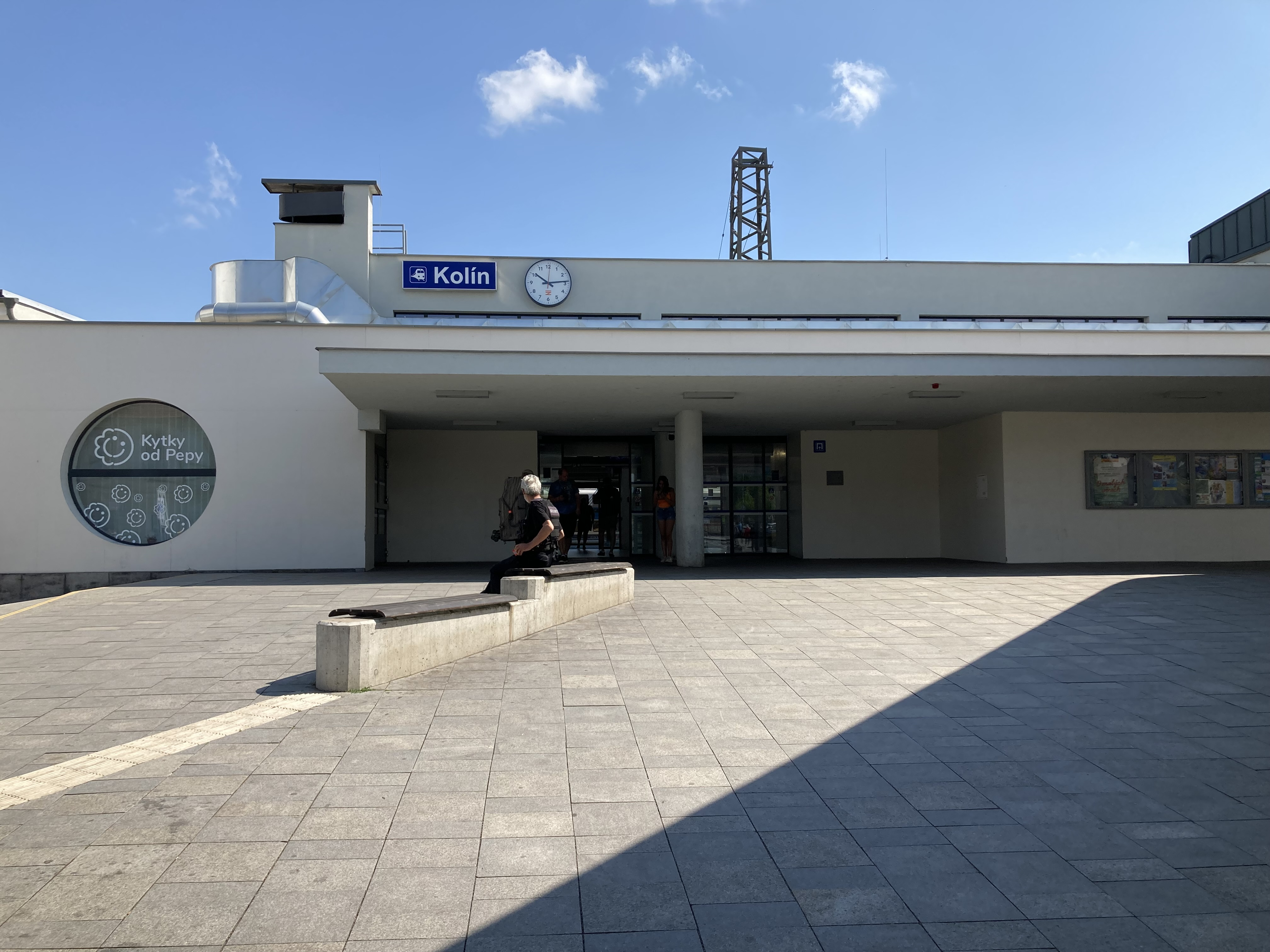
Kolín railway station alter reconstruction in 2023

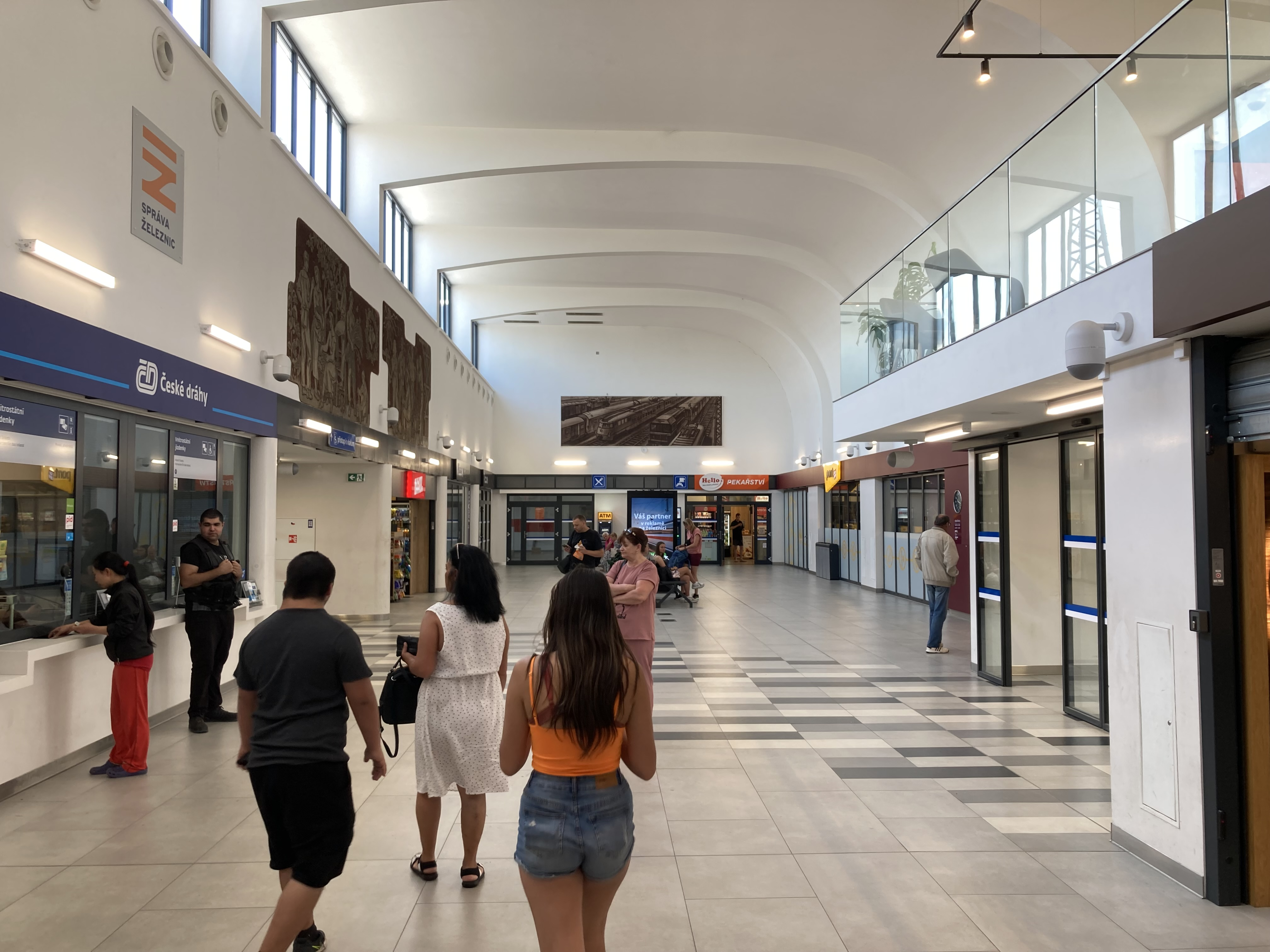
Station corridor

Pendolino train unit transferring the station

In 1918, Czechoslovak State Railways were established and the station got a new again. With the independence of Czechoslovakia, the Olomouc-Prague railway became the main railway line in the country. The station was no longer able to serve the increasing traffic demand. At that time there was still the original reception building from 1845 and the newer building from 1871. The Ministry of Railways had decided that the Kolín railway station should be rebuilt to meet the new conditions.

A brand-new building was designed by architect Vladimír Weiss in a functionalist style but it was built between 1938 and 1939, way after the previous plan, by Dr. ing. V. Mrha company at the place of the original reception building from 1845. In connection with the construction of the new reception building, a reception building from 1871 was also laid down and the platforms were built on an extra-level island. The reception building consisted of an oblong one-storey building, which was situated along the tracks. The larger part of the reception building occupied the central courtyard, which served as a departure hall. From there, the stair led to the subway to the island platforms. The symbol of the new railway station was the emblem of the winged wheel in which the clock was placed, it was located above the entrance.

In the summer of 1939, the station was used for long-distance national connections from Prague Wilson Station (central) to Havlíčkův Brod and Jihlava. Connections with regular departure from Kolín at 8:27 and at 17:15 arrived in Jihlava at 10:24 and at 19:07. On the territory of the Protectorate of Bohemia and Moravia, the state railway company Českomoravské dráhy was established during the Second World War, but changing the owner was just formal. On 18 April 1945 Kolín station was bombed by Allied air forces. The freight and marshalling yards were most damaged during the raid. Bombing also damaged adjacent factories, especially "Draslovka" (Kalliwerke A.G.), which produced Zyklon B for usage in concentration camps. The station post office was also damaged.

After the end of World War II, the administration of the station passed to Czechoslovak State Railways. In the morning of 16 May 1945 president Edvard Beneš was welcomed there, as he used a train on his return from the war exile in Great Britain. At the head of the special train No. 11.554 was locomotive 387.032, the train was accompanied by an armored train "Moscow". By special timetable, the train stopped in Kolín with a ten-minute stop. The expected train stay at the station was from 12:28 to 12:38 (the timetable was probably not met). In addition, the armored train was accompanied by a condensing locomotive Class 52. The war-damaged railway station is documented in a film that Czech Television announced in Hledání ztraceného času. At 5pm of 15 June 1945, a freight train collided with a passenger one in the station, killing 27 people.

Station Kolín has not maintained its status of significance for decades. The proof may be a timetable issued one year after the end of the war. Ex 31 "Ostravan" passed the station. Also during World War II several connections from Prague to Ostrava and Brno were passing through the station. In the 1944 timetable, this was the case for express trains No. 3 and 9.

In the 1960s, the station was equipped with Soviet-type signal light. In the intermediate station section from Kolín to Pardubice, the automatic block signaling was already operating, also in the opposite section to Prague. On the other hand, a semi-automatic block with track gates was still used in the stations in direction to Havlíčkův Brod. Here the automatic block signaling appeared only in the 1980s. The symbol of the 1960s was Pannonia Express, which traveled through the station from Berlin to Sofia via Kutna Hora. In 1969/1970 it was Ex 56 "Pannonia" and Ex 57 "Pannonia". Trains were obligatory to be booked and had relatively high speeds at that time. They were already driven by electric locomotives E 499.1.

The modernization of track and station security equipment was also connected with an electrification of the station, although steam traction continued to take place on the line from Kolín to Havlíčkův Brod. Bratislava express train was driven by a steam locomotive of the 498.1 series, the Brno and Znojmo expresses by steam locomotive series 464.0. Trains to Golčov Jeníkov and Čáslav for the change were hauled by a steam locomotive of the 354.1 series. In the 1970s, train passengers could occasionally meet the prototype locomotive T324.001. This locomotive spent almost all of its life at the station. The wreck of this machine was shut down in Kolín depot on 28 May 1976.

In the 1980s, a "Pragotron" passenger information system was installed at the station.

After finishing the construction work on the I. Czech transit railway corridor, the station remained in a dilapidated state. Most of the stations on the track were not included in the corridor works, including Pardubice hl.n.. Revitalization of Kolín station took place several years later and was completed at the end of 2009. The most significant investment was the replacement of the original relay alarm system with the modern ESA11 computer-based interlocking. The first and second tracks allow a speed of 120 km/h (higher speeds can be passed through tilting units). A new two-storey administrative building, called "No. 2", was also built. The platforms No. 2 and No. 3 with a total length of 400 meters were rebuilt and extended. Reconstruction also underwent the expedition building within the Czech Railways project "Živá nádraží" (Live stations). The selection process for the reconstruction of the building was won by AŽD Prague in 2006. The reconstruction was divided into several stages, where the original station security system was replaced by the modern one. On 20 April 2016 the prototype of the M 260.001 "Silver Arrow" arrived at Cologne Station. It symbolically recalled the Slovenská strela from 1936/1937, which regularly traveled (not stopping) to the station. This elegant motorcar never got into regular operation.

The railway accidents of passenger and freight trains in the station and in its immediate vicinity have also occurred in modern history. On 28 November 2009 passenger train number 2103 from Prague to Pardubice, formed by a 471 electric unit, derailed when entering the station. The accident caused no injuries and the damage to the ramp amounted to one million crowns.

In the front of the station there is the city bus terminal.

== Links ==
=== Literature ===
- HONS, Josef. Čtení o dráze olomoucko-pražské. Praha: Mladá fronta, 2007. 309 p. ISBN 978-80-204-1597-4. (Czech)
- KREJČIŘÍK, Mojmír. Česká nádraží, architektura a stavební vývoj, II. díl. Litoměřice: Vydavatelství dopravní literatury Ing. Luděk Čada, 2005. ISBN 80-86765-02-4. (Czech)
- RACHOTA, Jan. Československé státní dráhy před půlstoletím. Chyňava: SAXI, 2012. 206 p. ISBN 978-80-904767-5-2. (Czech)
- WOHLMUTH, Jiří. 45 let Stavební správy Praha: 1962-2007. Praha: SAXI, 2007. 270 p. (Czech)
- WOHLMUTH, Jiří. 10 let železničních koridorů v Čechách: Děčín - Praha - Česká Třebová. Praha: SAXI, 2003. 136 p. (Czech)
- HALAMKA, Pavel; LANDA, Ladislav; DOBIÁŠ, Ivan. 150 let železnice v České Třebové. Česká Třebová: Depo kolejových vozidel v České Třebové, 1995. (Czech)
- JOUZA, Ladislav; PLAVEC, Michal. A země se chvěla : bombardování Kolína za druhé světové války. Cheb: Svět křídel, 2007. 223 p. ISBN 80-868-08-44-0. (Czech)
- KREJČÍ, Ivan; SCHREIER, Pavel. Velká obnova : čtení o znovuzrození dráhy olomoucko-pražské. Praha: Mladá fronta, 2007. 309 p. ISBN 978-80-204-1708-4. (Czech)
- LAPÁČEK, Petr. Vojenské a válečné vlaky. Brno: CPress, 2016. 142 p. ISBN 978-80-264-1193-2. (Czech)
- SCHREIRER, Pavel. Naše dráhy ve 20. století: pohledy do železniční historie. Praha: Mladá fronta, 2010. 173 p. ISBN 978-80-204-2312-2. (Czech)
