= Praha-Zahradní Město railway station =

Railway station in Prague, Czech Republic

Praha-Zahradní Město
- Praha-Zahradní Město station

General information
- Location: Czech Republic
- Coordinates: 50.06226°N 14.50331°E
- Elevation: 242
- Owner: Správa železnic
- Line: Praha hl.n.–Benešov u Prahy (–České Budějovice)
- Platforms: 3
- Tracks: 9
- Train operators: České dráhy
- Connections: Tram interchange Bus interchange

History
- Opened: 24 September 2021

Services
Preceding station	Esko Prague	Following station
Praha-Eden towards Milovice	S9	Praha-Hostivař towards Strančice or Benešov u Prahy
Praha-Vršovice towards Praha hl.n.	R17	Benešov u Prahy towards České Budějovice, České Velenice or Wien FJB
Praha-Vršovice towards Praha hl.n.	R49	Praha-Hostivař towards Tábor
Location

Praha-Zahradní Město is a railway station in Prague, Czech Republic, between Praha-Eden and Praha-Hostivař stations on the line from Prague to Benešov u Prahy. It is located in Prague 10, near the Zahradní Město neighbourhood, on the site of the former Vršovice marshalling yard. The station was opened on 24 September 2021 and forms a transfer hub with tram and bus stops situated directly beneath its platforms. It is served by Esko Prague (a commuter rail system, part of the Prague Integrated Transport) trains (lines S9 and R49) and by long-distance R17 trains.

== Construction ==
The station was built as part of the modernisation of the corridor section between Praha-Hostivař and Praha hlavní nádraží, on a new four-track realignment laid through the area of the former Vršovice marshalling yard. Construction of the section started in 2018. The new alignment allows speeds of up to 120 km/h (75 mph) and is 232 metres shorter than the original route.

== Opening ==
The station was opened on 24 September 2021 by Prime Minister Andrej Babiš and Minister of Transport Karel Havlíček, on the same day as the extended underpass at Praha hlavní nádraží. It opened before construction was fully completed; at the time of opening, some escalators and accesses to the platforms were still missing, and the completed escalators and lifts were not yet working. Until the timetable change in December 2021, only regional trains called at the station; R17 fast trains began stopping there in December 2021.

== Layout ==
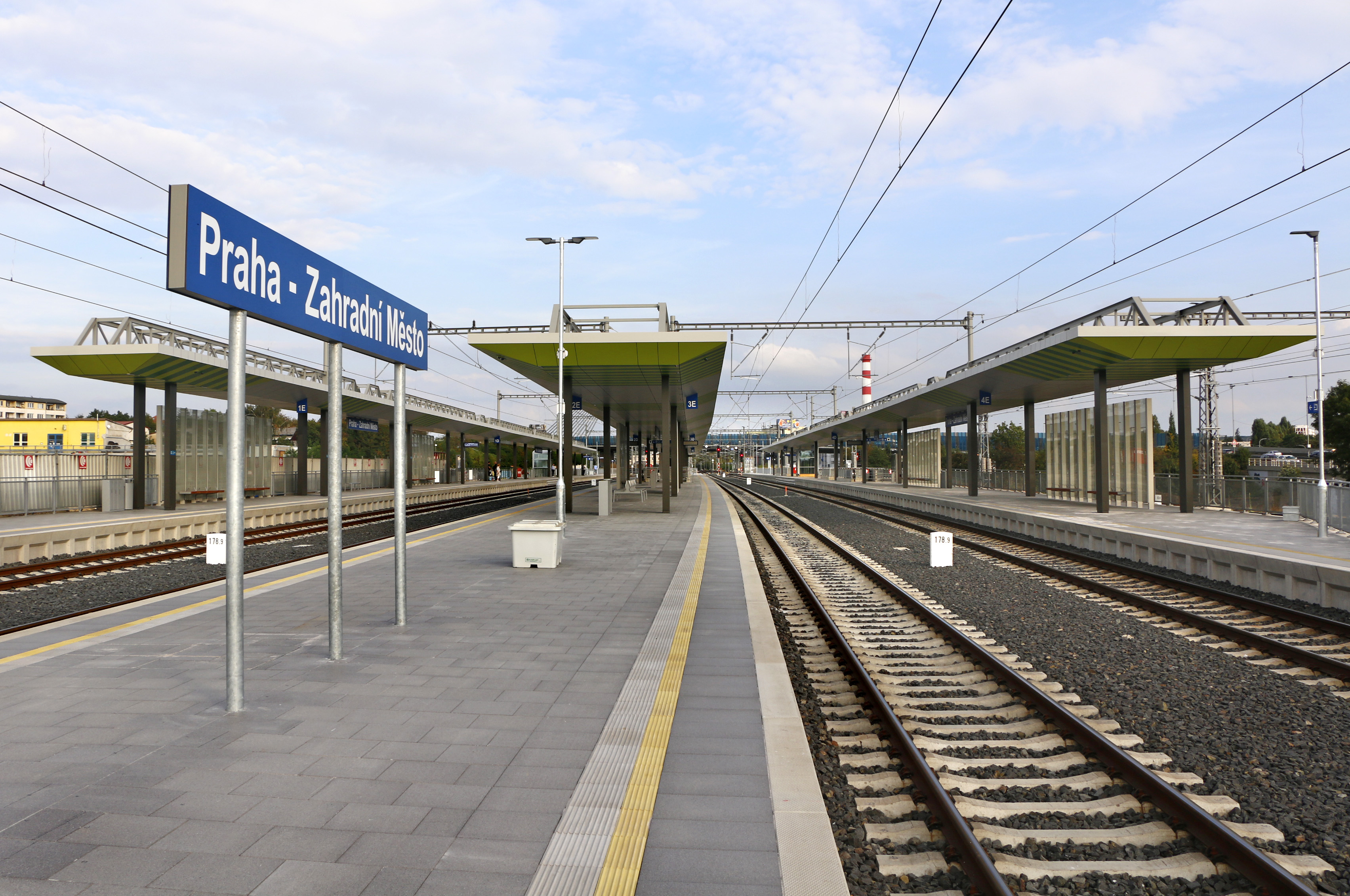
Platforms of the station in 2021

The station is located at the crossing with the widened Průběžná street. It has two island platforms and one side platform, connected by stairs, escalators and lifts with the tram and bus stops in the underpass below. The station offers barrier-free access and has a ticket office.

== Connections ==
Platforms of the station in 2022

Together with the station, new tram and bus stops named Nádraží Zahradní Město were opened in the underpass directly beneath the railway platforms, with buses sharing the platforms with trams. At the same time, tram line 22 was extended to a new turning loop at Zahradní Město. At the opening, the stops were served by tram lines 22 and 26, night tram lines 97 and 99, and bus lines 101, 138, 175, 177 and 195; the same lines served the stop as of 2026. The train journey to Praha hlavní nádraží takes 12 minutes.

== Future ==
Správa železnic has been examining options for expanding the station in connection with the planned high-speed rail line from Prague. The plans would add two platforms in the northern part of the station and two through tracks allowing long-distance trains to stop.
