= Praha-Vršovice railway station =

Railway station in Nusle, Czech Republic

Praha-Vršovice
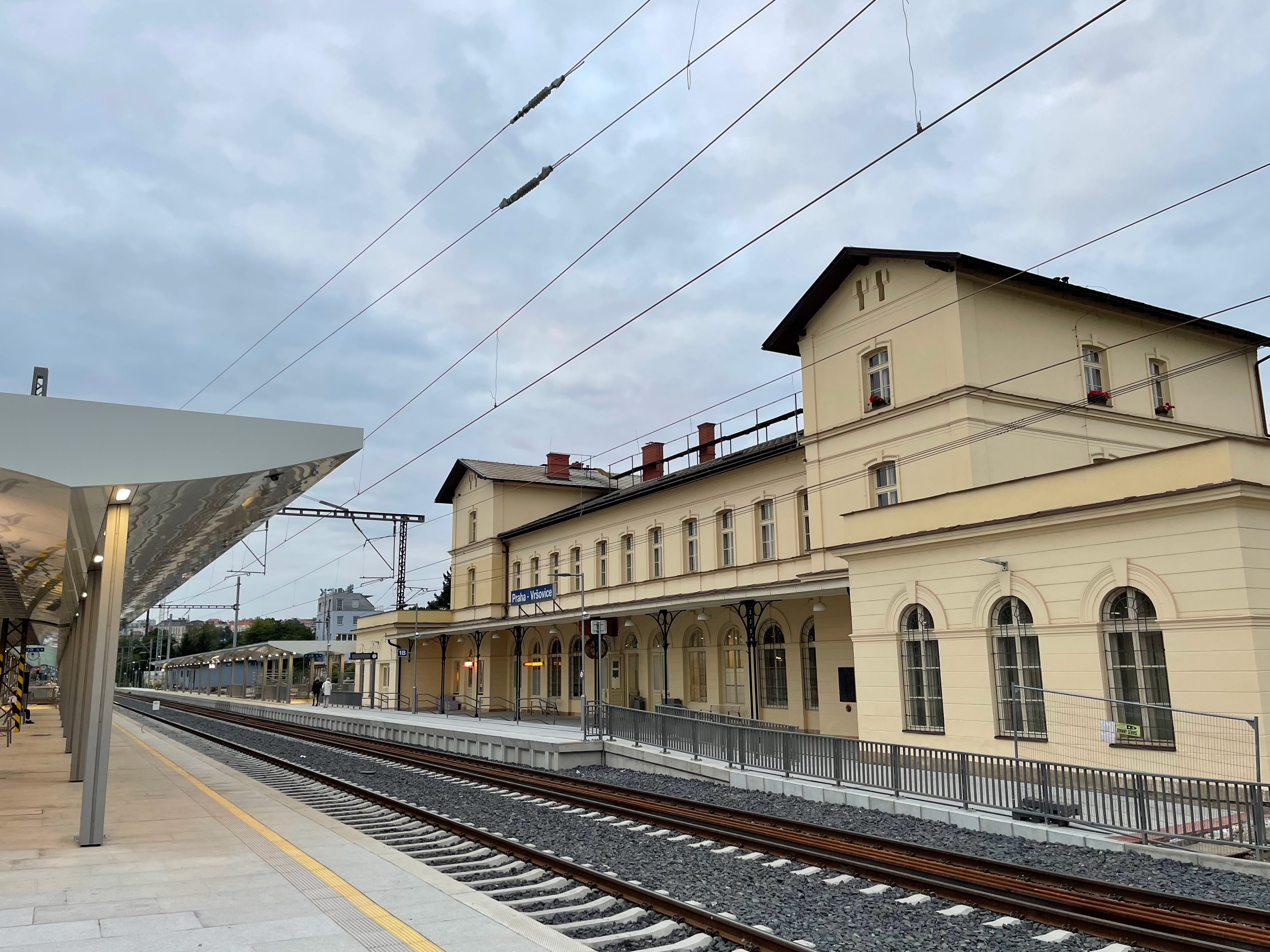

General information
- Location: Prague, Ukrajinská; Czech Republic
- Coordinates: 50°03′53″N 14°26′52″E
- Owner: Czech Republic

Other information
- Station code: 572768
- Fare zone: PID: P

History
- Opened: 1880
Location

Praha-Vršovice railway station (Czech: Nádraží Praha-Vršovice) is a railway station located in Prague 4, located at the edge of Vršovice and Nusle, which carried 1,826,000 passengers in 2009. The station is located on the main line from Praha hlavní nádraží to České Budějovice, and the local line to Dobříš and Čerčany via Vrané nad Vltavou.

The mainline to České Budějovice opened in 1871, beginning from what is now Praha-Hostivař railway station. On March 1, 1882, the line was extended further towards Prague to this station, which was opened under the name Nusle. The station was renamed Nusle–Vršovice in 1912, and then Praha-Vršovice in 1948. The station is classed as a cultural monument. The station was reconstructed between 2019 and 2021, which included the opening of a new underpass to Nusle.

Vršovice station is not served by the Prague Metro, but numerous tram routes call outside the station on Vršovická street.

== Services ==
| Preceding station | České dráhy | Following station |
|---|---|---|
| Praha-Zahradní Město | Fast trains | Praha hl.n. toward Praha hl.n. |
| Praha hl.n. | Fast trains | Praha-Zahradní Město toward České Budějovice |

| Preceding station | Esko Prague | Following station |
|---|---|---|
| Praha-Kačerov towards Praha hl.n. | S8 | Praha hl.n. towards Čerčany |
| Praha-Kačerov towards Dobříš | S80 | Praha hl.n. Terminus |
| Praha-Eden towards Praha hl.n. or Milovice | S9 | Praha hl.n. towards Strančice or Benešov u Prahy |

== Gallery ==
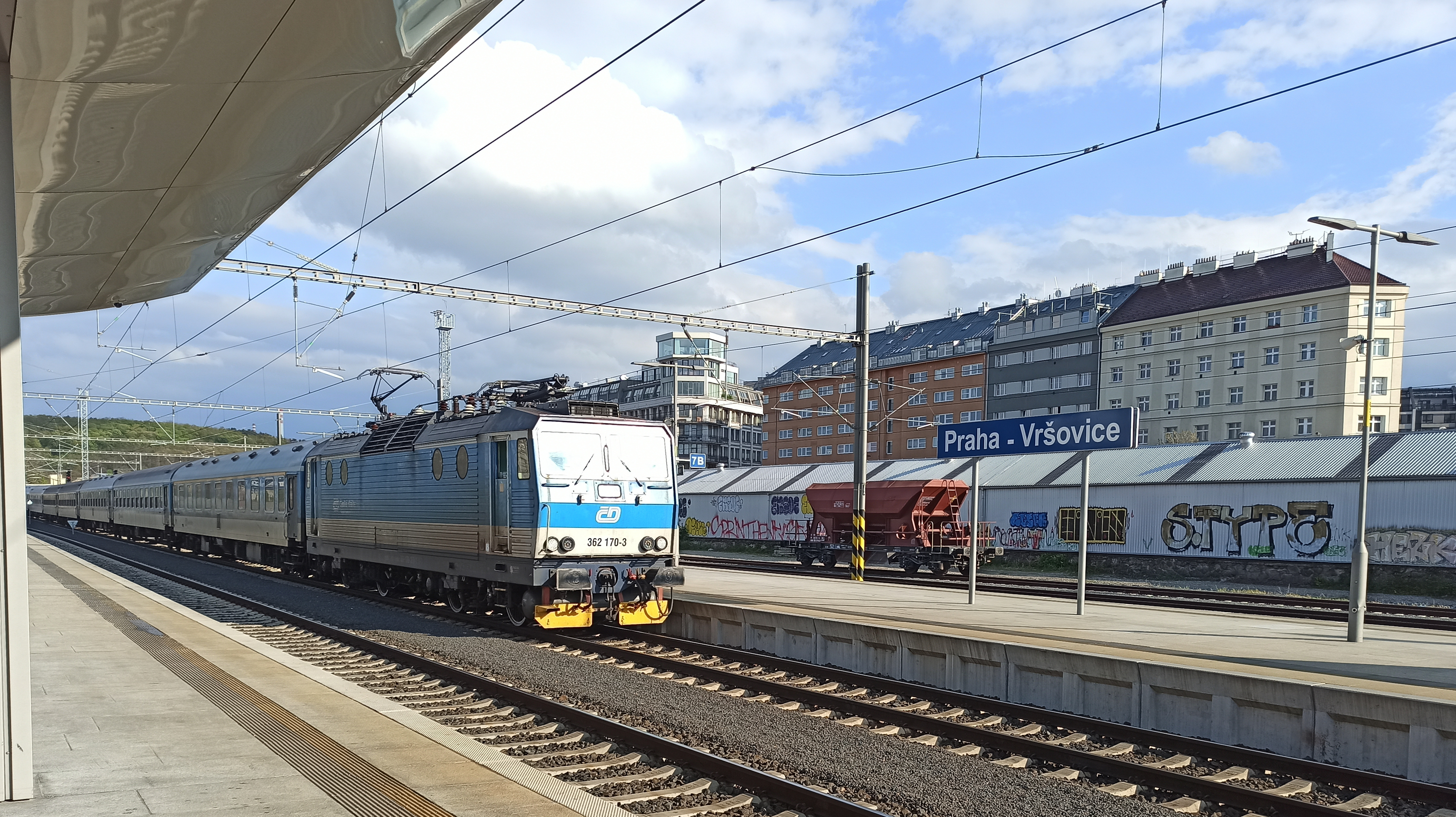
A CD train for Brno arriving from the depot

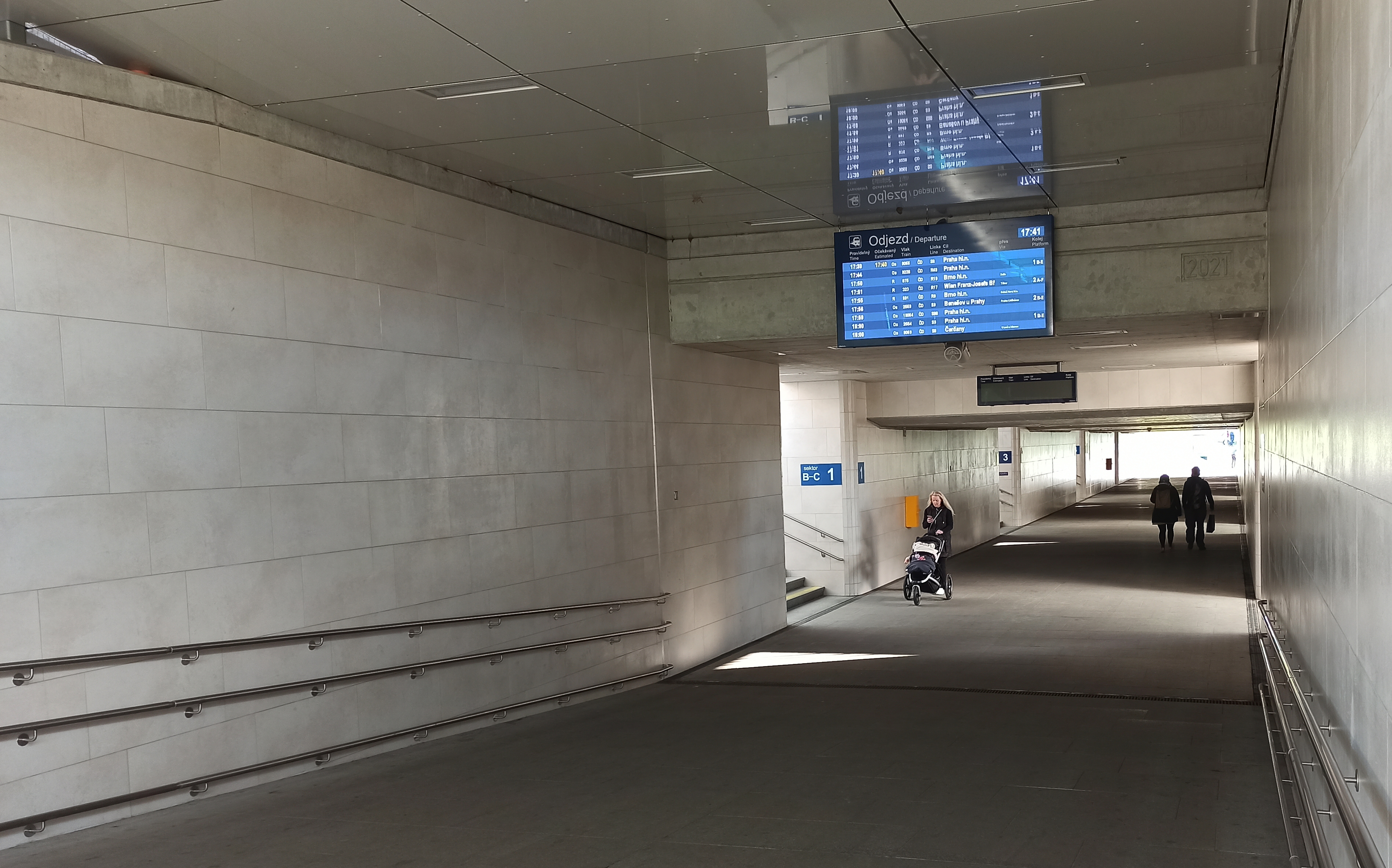
The north end of the underpass

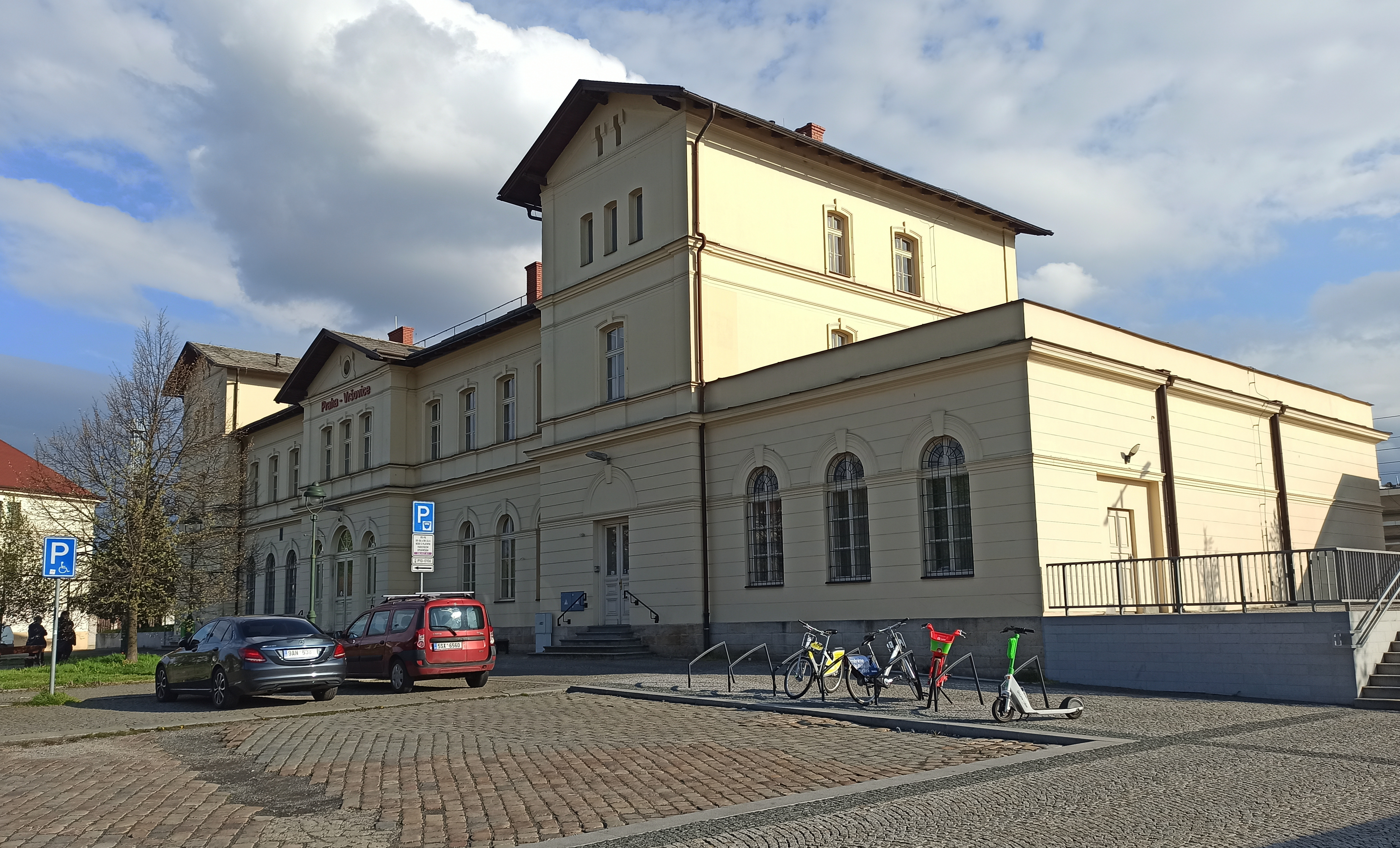
The street side of the station

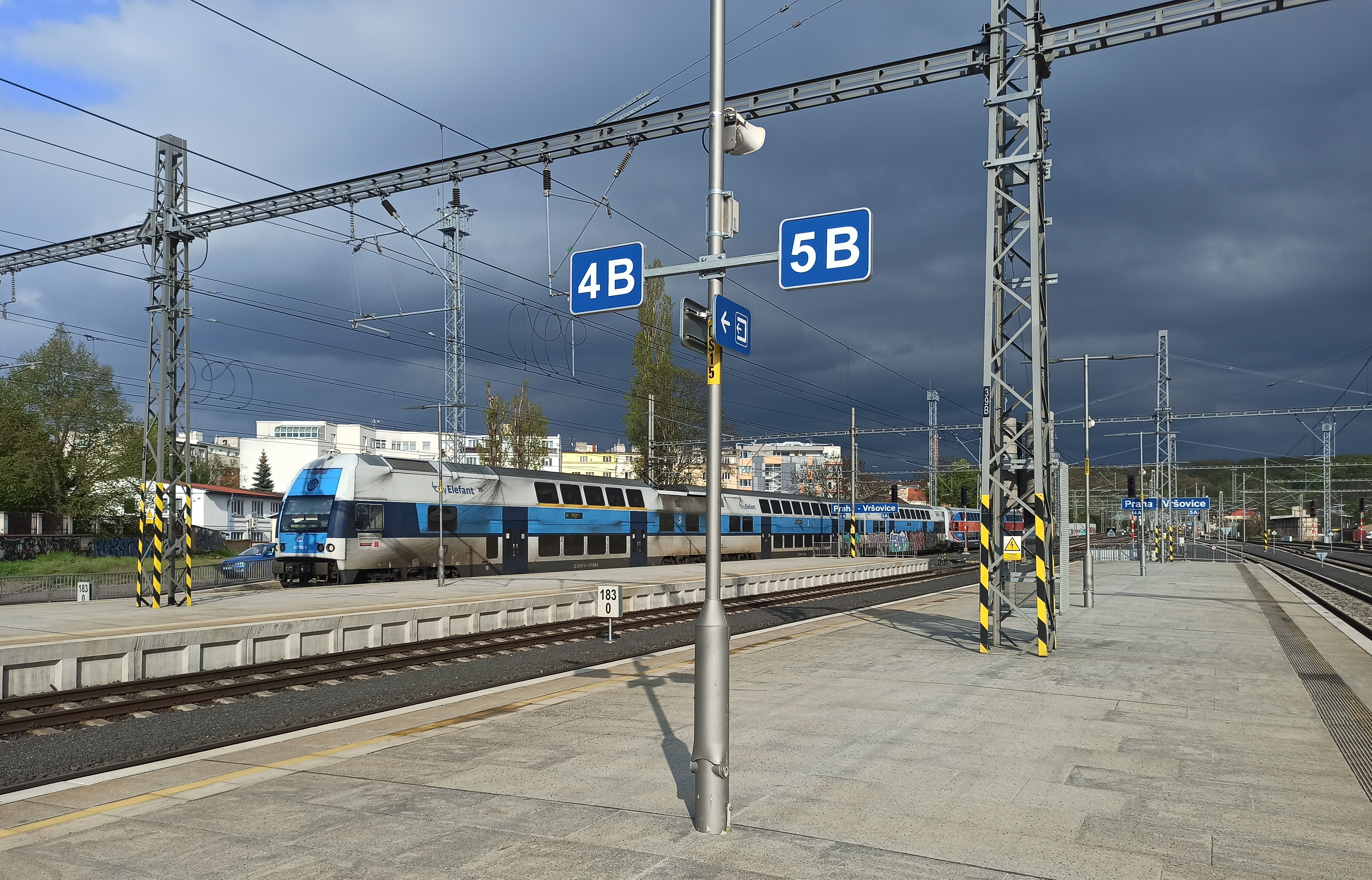
Looking south east towards the depot

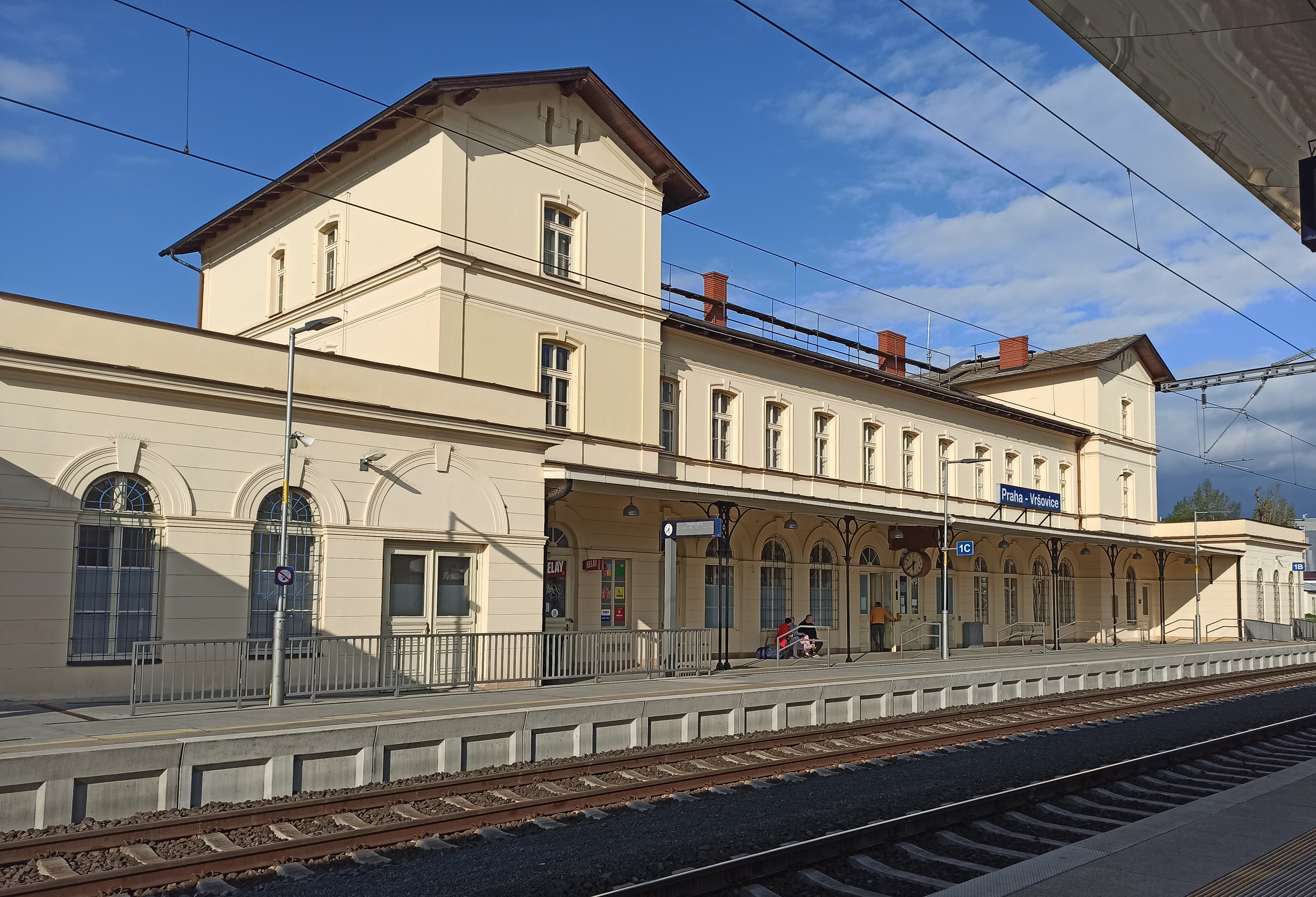
The station building and Platform 1
