= Praha-Eden railway station =

Railway station

Praha-Eden
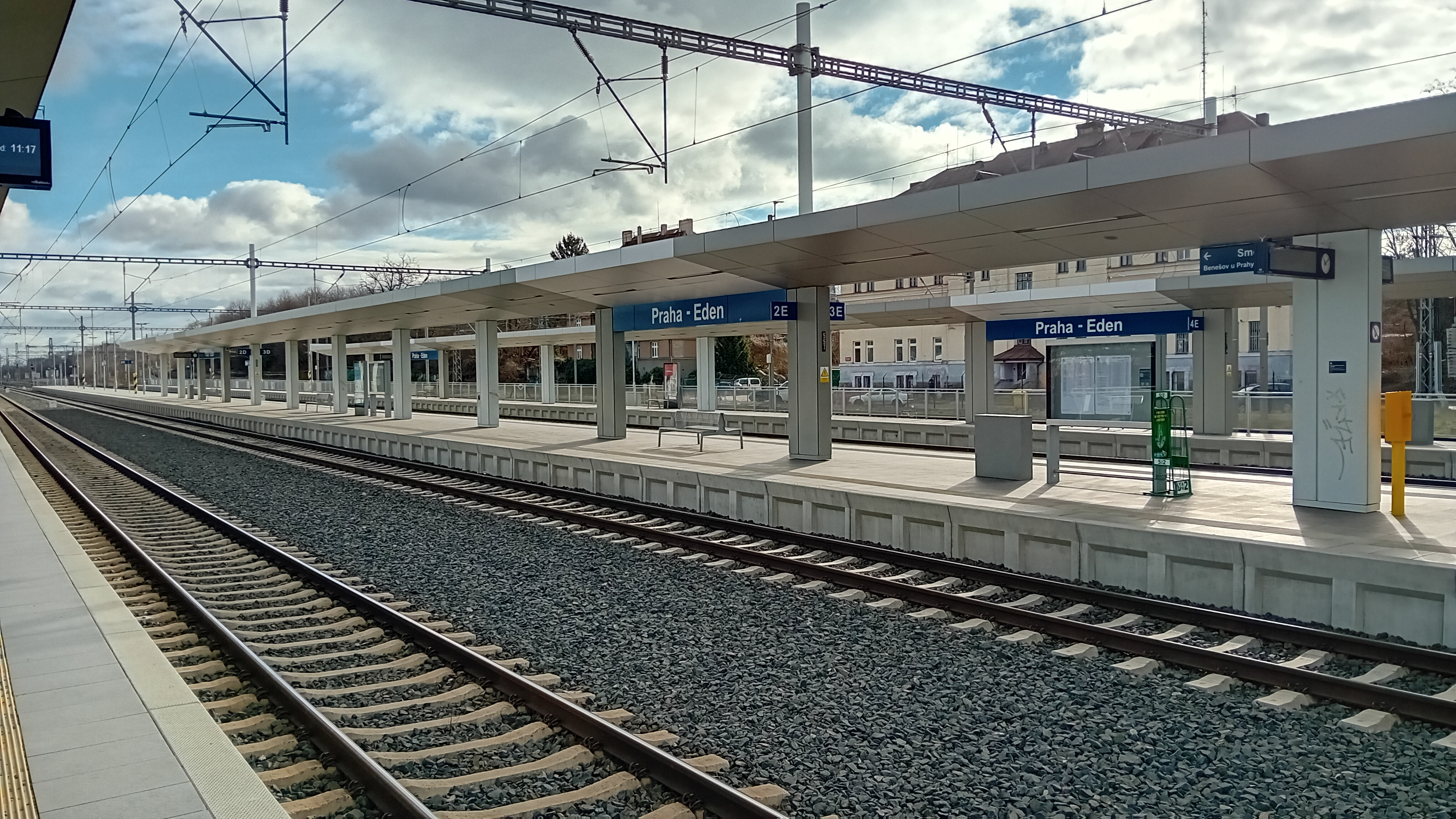
- Platform 2

General information
- Location: Czech Republic
- Coordinates: 50°3′56.56″N 14°28′18.41″E
- Elevation: 214
- Line: Praha hl.n.–Benešov u Prahy (–České Budějovice)
- Platforms: 3
- Tracks: 6
- Train operators: České dráhy
- Connections: trams, buses

History
- Opened: 13 December 2020
Location

Praha-Eden is a railway station in Prague, between Praha-Vršovice and Praha-Zahradní Město stations. The platforms are located in the Strašnice district of Prague, south of Vršovice and north of Záběhlice. It was opened in 13 December 2020. It is served by Esko Prague (a commuter rail system, part of the Prague Integrated Transport) trains (line S9).

== Construction ==
The construction started in 2018, as a part of modernisation of a corridor section between Praha-Hostivař and Praha hlavní nádraží.

== Location ==
The station lies near the Slavia Prague stadium and Eden shopping centre. It is connected to Prague public transport by buses and trams.

== Opening ==
The station was put in operation at 13 December 2020. At the same time, the Praha-Strašnice zastávka station was closed.

== Services ==
Preceding station	České dráhy	Following station
Praha-Vršovice	Stopping trains	Praha-Zahradní Město toward Strančice or Benešov u Prahy
Praha-Zahradní Město	Stopping trains	Praha-Vršovice toward Praha hl.n.
