= Čerčany =

- Municipality
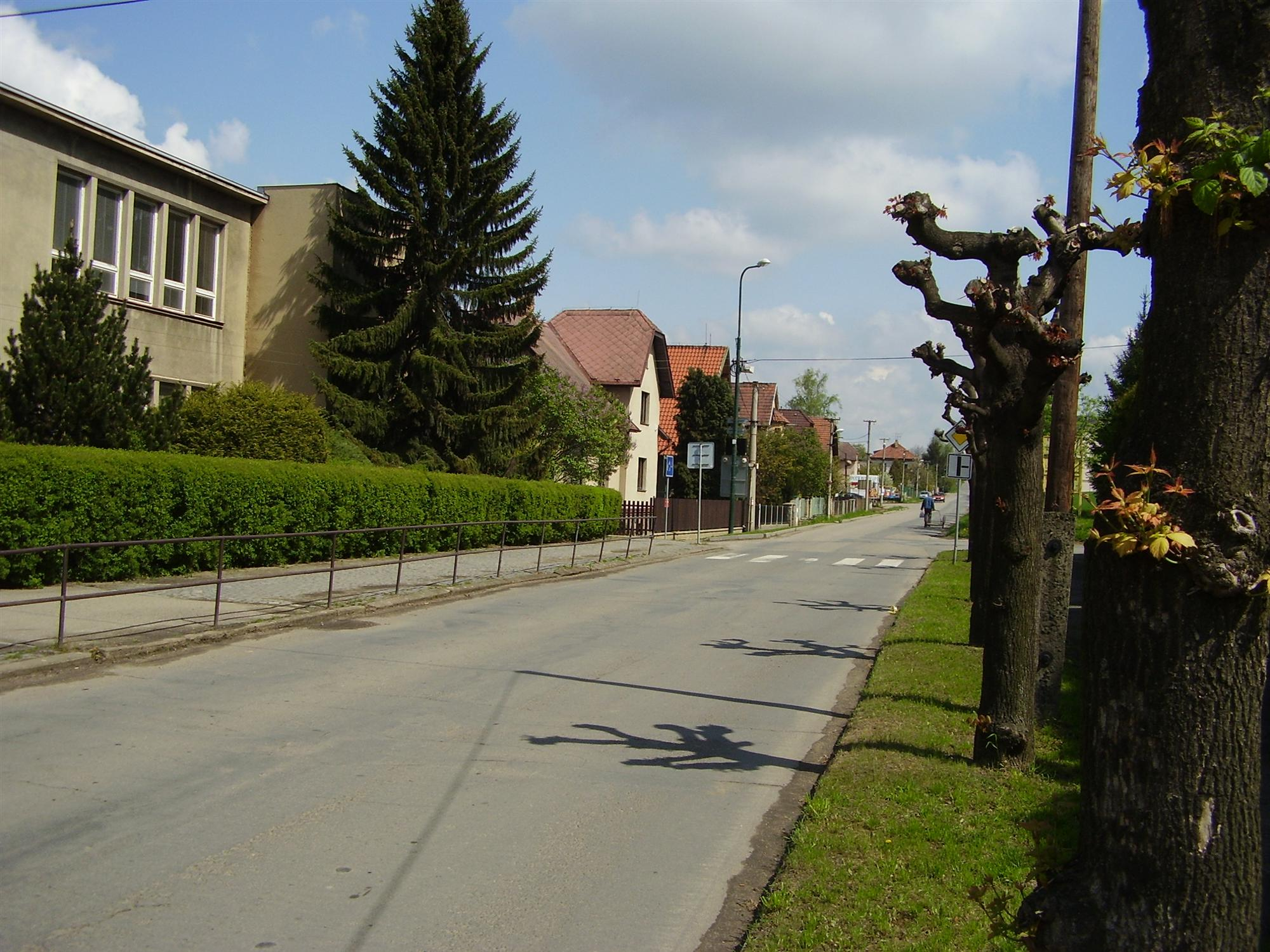
- Main road

- Flag Coat of arms

- Location in the Czech Republic
- Coordinates: 49°51′11″N 14°42′11″E
- Country: Czech Republic
- Region: Central Bohemian
- District: Benešov
- First mentioned: 1356

Area
  - Total: 6.45 km^{2} (2.49 sq mi)
- Elevation: 285 m (935 ft)

Population (2026-01-01)
  - Total: 3,175
  - Density: 492/km^{2} (1,270/sq mi)
- Time zone: UTC+1 (CET)
  - Summer (DST): UTC+2 (CEST)
- Postal code: 257 22
- Website: www.cercany.cz

Čerčany (Czech pronunciation: [ˈtʃɛrtʃanɪ]) is a municipality and village in Benešov District in the Central Bohemian Region in the Czech Republic. It has about 3,200 inhabitants.

== Administrative division ==
Čerčany consists of 15 municipal parts (in brackets population according to the 2021 census):

- Čerčany (2,486)
- Vysoká Lhota (508)

== Etymology ==
The original name of the settlement was Črnčany and was derived from the personal name Črnek or Črnec. The personal name itself was derived from černý (i.e. 'black').

== Geography ==
Čerčany is located about 7 kilometres (4 mi) north of Benešov and 24 km (15 mi) southeast of Prague. It lies in the Benešov Uplands. The highest point is the hill Čerčanský chlum at 530 m (1,740 ft) above sea level. The Sázava River flows through the municipality.

== History ==
The first written mention of Čerčany is from 1356. The turning point was the construction of the railway from Prague to České Budějovice, which was completed in 1871, and Čerčany became a railway junction thanks to it. This contributed to the growth of the settlement, which at that time was part of Lštění. Čerčany has become a popular holiday resort. In 1919, Čerčany became an independent municipality.

== Demographics ==
Historical population

Year	Pop.	±%
1869	296	—
1880	369	+24.7%
1890	373	+1.1%
1900	418	+12.1%
1910	525	+25.6%

Year	Pop.	±%
1921	687	+30.9%
1930	1,299	+89.1%
1950	1,634	+25.8%
1961	2,059	+26.0%
1970	1,986	−3.5%

Year	Pop.	±%
1980	2,124	+6.9%
1991	2,656	+25.0%
2001	2,609	−1.8%
2011	2,791	+7.0%
2021	2,994	+7.3%

Source: Censuses

== Transport ==
The I/3 road, which is part of the European route E55, runs through Čerčany.

Čerčany is located on the railway line Prague–Benešov. It is also the starting point of the railway line to Ledeč nad Sázavou.

== Sights ==
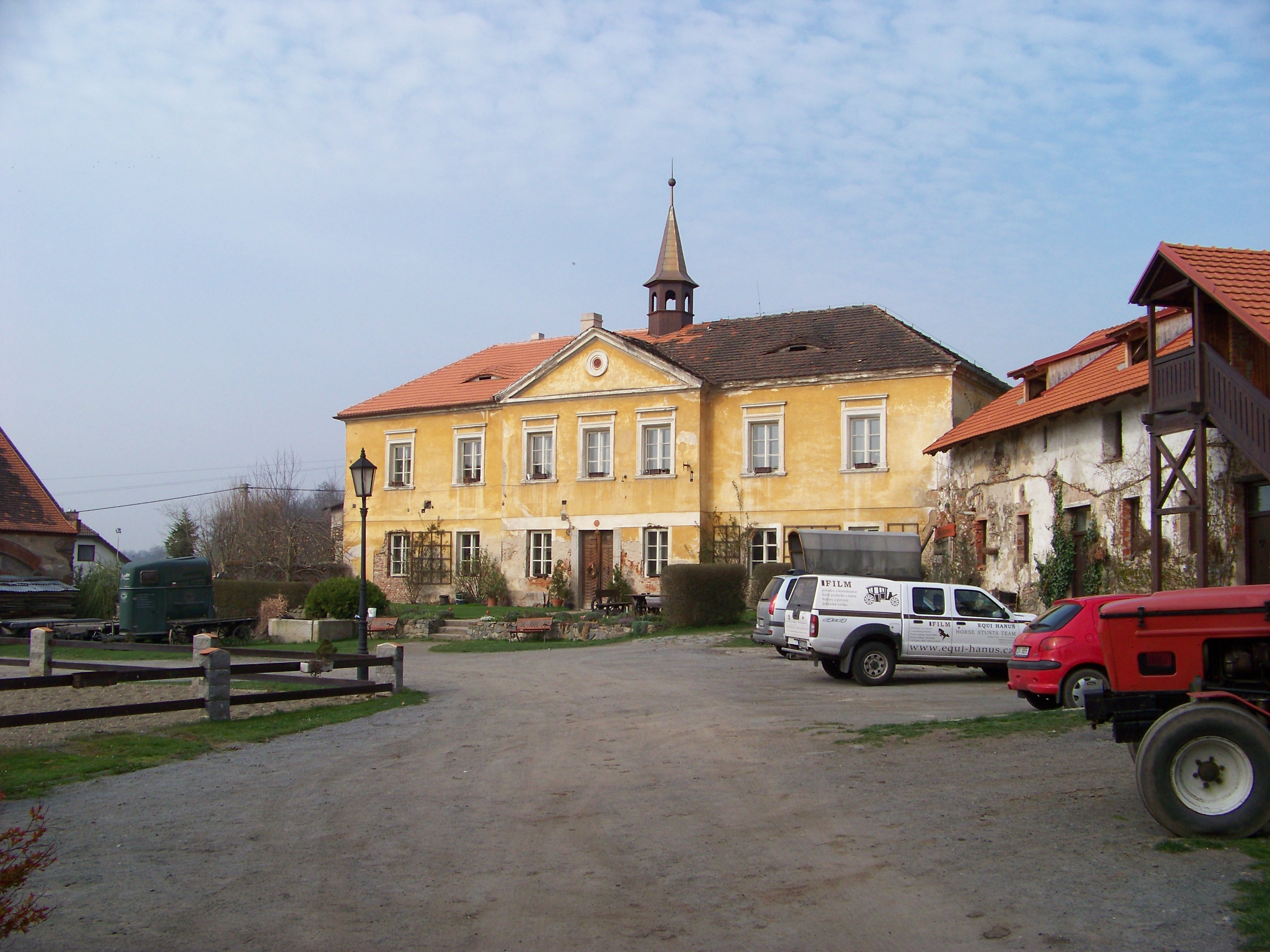
Vysoká Lhota Castle

In Vysoká Lhota is the Vysoká Lhota Castle. It was first documented in 1550. Baroque reconstruction took place in the 1740s. Today there is a museum of carriages and wagons, and an exhibition about the history of the castle.

== Notable people ==
- Vlastimil Horváth (born 1977), singer
