= Praha hlavní nádraží =

Railway station in Prague, Czech Republic

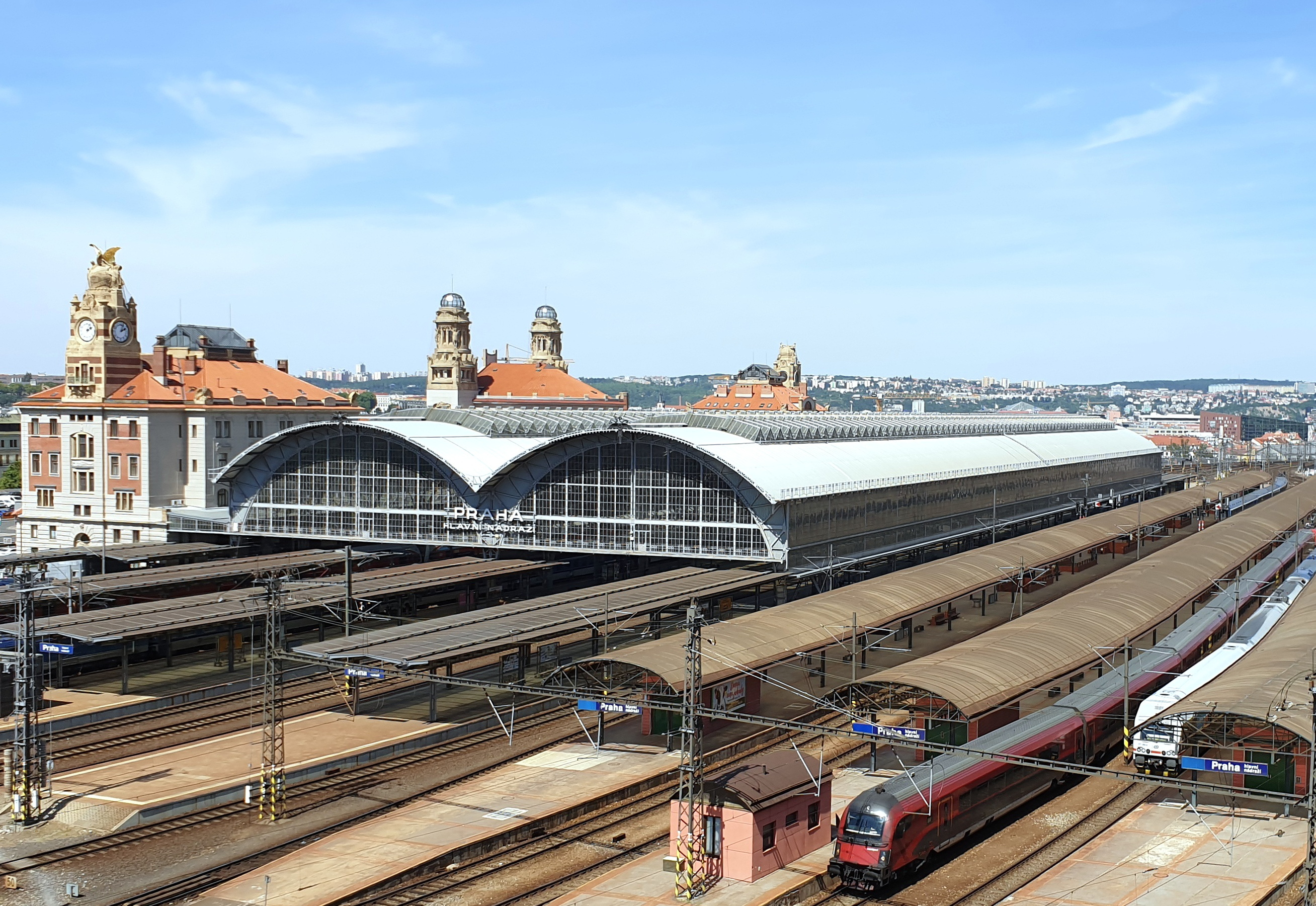
- View of the station from Vinohradská street

General information
- Location: Prague-Vinohrady; Czech Republic
- Coordinates: 50°04′59″N 14°26′09″E
- Owner: Správa železnic
- Platforms: 9
- Connections: C Hlavní nádraží 9, 15, 26, 95, 98 AE

Construction
- Architect: Vojtěch Ignác Ullmann; Antonín Viktor Barvitius; Josef Fanta
- Architectural style: Art Nouveau

Other information
- Station code: 54570762
- IATA code: XYG
- Fare zone: PID: P

History
- Opened: 14 December 1871; 154 years ago
- Rebuilt: 1901–1909; 1972–1979
- Electrified: 1926–1928
Services
Preceding station	České dráhy	Following station
Terminus	SuperCity Pendolino	Pardubice towards Ostrava
Praha-Smíchov towards Františkovy Lázně	SuperCity Pendolino	Pardubice towards Ostrava
Terminus	Railjet	Pardubice towards Graz
Praha-Holešovice towards Hamburg-Altona, Kiel Hbf or København H	Railjet	Terminus
Praha-Smíchov towards Plzeň	R	Terminus
Terminus	R	Praha-Libeň towards Brno
Praha-Vršovice towards České Budějovice	R	Terminus
Terminus	R	Praha-Holešovice towards Chomutov or Cheb
Terminus	R	Praha-Vysočany towards Trutnov
Terminus	R	Praha-Vysočany towards Hradec Králové
Preceding station	EuroCity	Following station
Tábor towards Zürich HB	EuroNight	Terminus
Terminus	EuroNight	Kolín towards Humenné
Praha-Holešovice towards Zürich HB	EuroCity	Terminus
Praha-Holešovice towards Hamburg-Altona	EuroCity	Terminus
Praha-Holešovice towards Hamburg-Altona, Flensburg, Kiel Hbf or Berlin Hbf	EuroCity Berliner	Terminus
Tábor towards Český Krumlov or Linz Hbf	EuroCity Jižní expres	Terminus
Terminus	EuroCity Metropolitan	Praha-Holešovice towards Budapest Nyugati
Preceding station	ÖBB	Following station
Reverses direction	Nightjet	Praha-Holešovice towards Berlin Hbf
Reverses direction	Nightjet	Pardubice towards Graz Hbf
Preceding station		Following station
Praha-Smíchov towards München Hbf	RE 25	Terminus
Preceding station	European Sleeper	Following station
Děčín main towards Brussels-South	Brussels–Prague	Terminus
Preceding station	Esko Prague	Following station
Terminus	S2	Praha-Vysočany towards Nymburk hl.n. or Kolín
Terminus	S22	Praha-Vysočany towards Milovice
Terminus	S3	Praha-Vysočany towards Mělník
Praha-Smíchov towards Řevnice or Beroun	S7	Terminus
Terminus	S8	Praha-Vršovice towards Čerčany
Terminus	S88	Praha-Vršovice towards Dobříš
Praha-Vysočany towards Milovice	S9	Praha-Vršovice towards Strančice or Benešov u Prahy
Terminus	S61	Praha-Libeň towards Úvaly
Terminus	S65	Praha-Smíchov sev. nást. towards Hostivice or Rudná u Prahy
Terminus	R16	Praha-Smíchov towards Plzeň hl.n.
Terminus	R21	Praha-Vysočany towards Tanvald
Terminus	R41	Praha-Libeň towards Kutná Hora
Terminus	R43	Praha-Vysočany towards Mladá Boleslav hl.n.
Preceding station	Leo Express	Following station
Terminus	Leo Express	Pardubice hl.n. towards Bohumín
Terminus	Leo Express	Lichkov towards Wrocław Główny
Preceding station	RegioJet	Following station
Terminus	IC RegioJet	Pardubice hl.n. towards Bratislava
Terminus	IC RegioJet	Pardubice hl.n. towards Vienna
Terminus	IC RegioJet	Pardubice hl.n. towards Budapest Déli
Terminus	IC RegioJet	Pardubice hl.n. towards Humenné
Preceding station	Arriva vlaky	Following station
Praha-Smíchov towards České Budějovice	R26	Terminus
Location
- Location within Czech Republic

Praha hlavní nádraží (IATA: XYG) is the largest railway station in Prague, Czech Republic. It opened in 1871 as Franz Josef Station, after Franz Joseph I of Austria. During the First Republic and from 1945 to 1948 the station was called Wilson Station (Czech: Wilsonovo nádraží), after the former President of the United States Woodrow Wilson.

The station is the largest Art Nouveau monument in the Czech Republic. Since 31 December 1976, it has been a cultural monument of the Czech Republic and since 1993 it has been part of the urban monument zone of Vinohrady, Žižkov and Vršovice.

In 2014, the station served 224,505 trains (610 daily) and more than 53,000,000 passengers (90,000 daily) and a number of regional, national and international trains, for which it is often the starting or final station. The station is connected to Prague Metro Line C and the Hlavní nádraží railway station.

== Overview ==
=== Initial construction ===
The original Emperor Franz Joseph station, between 1871 and 1892

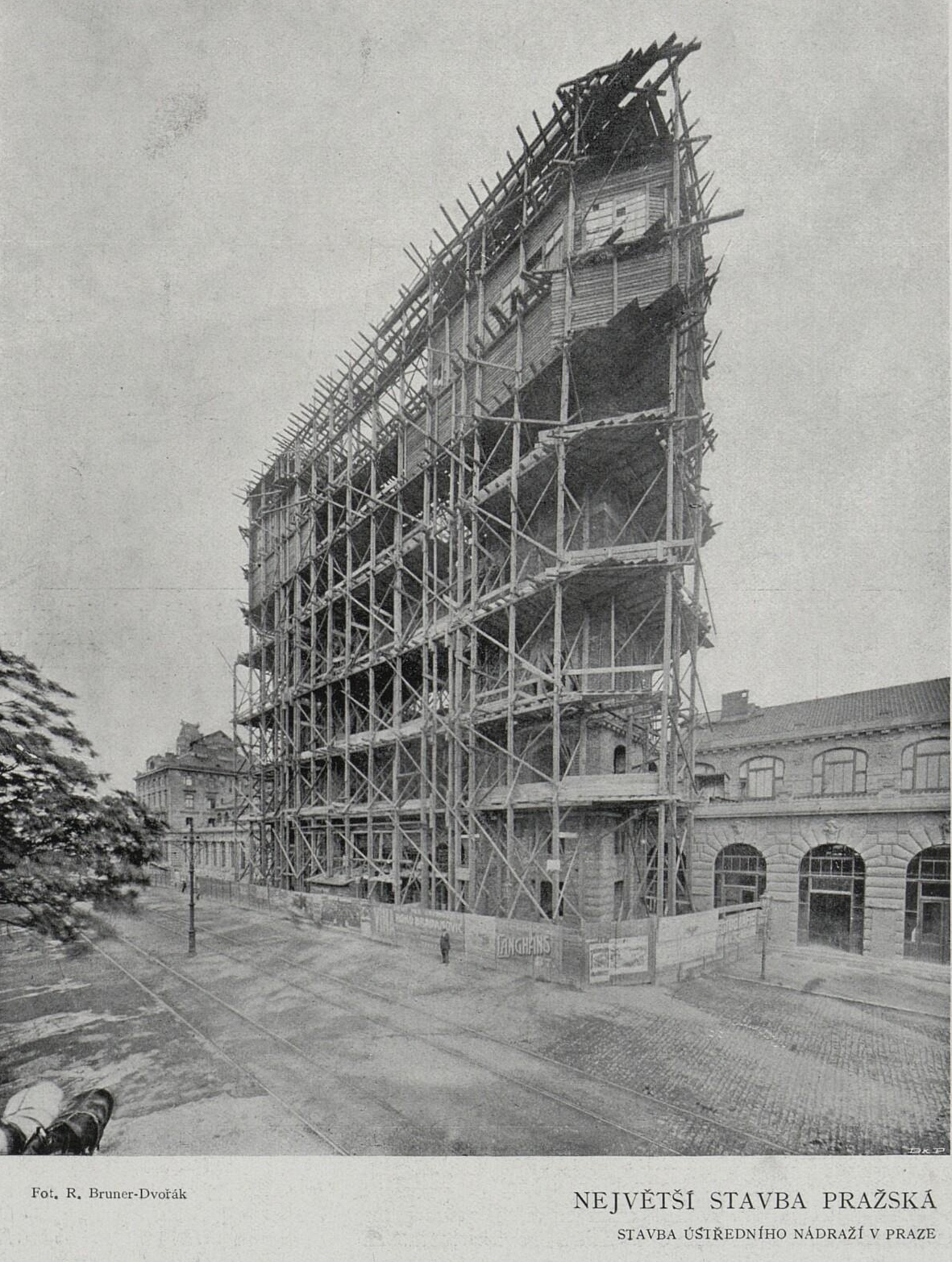
Construction of the Main Station, 1907

The imperial decision of October 1866 to demolish the walls contributed to the construction of the railway station in the current location. The station has been in operation since 14 December 1871, when the southbound Emperor Franz Joseph Railway service to Benešov, Tábor and Vienna started from it. At the time, the station was known as "Franz Josef Station".

In 1872, the Turnov-Kralupy-Prague railway was terminated at a separate station close to the Emperor František Josef Railway station. The two stations soon merged. The Prague Connecting Railway was also put into operation on the Smíchov (Czech Western Railway), Prague and Hrabovka (connected to the Austrian Northwestern Railway) routes, thus connecting the stations of four different companies. The Vinohrady tunnel led the railways to Vienna and Smíchov separately, only after the double-tracking of the connecting railway in 1901 were the two lines connected already in front of the Vršov portal.

The original narrative building was built according to the design of Vojtěch Ignác Ullmann and Antonín Viktor Barvitius in a Renaissance Revival style. The 150-metre-long building with two towers, a hall with a coffered ceiling, a restaurant, offices and 22 doors leading to a mosaic-paved platform has earned the nickname "castle station". Velký park was founded in front of the station in 1876.

=== Art Nouveau station construction (1901–1909) ===
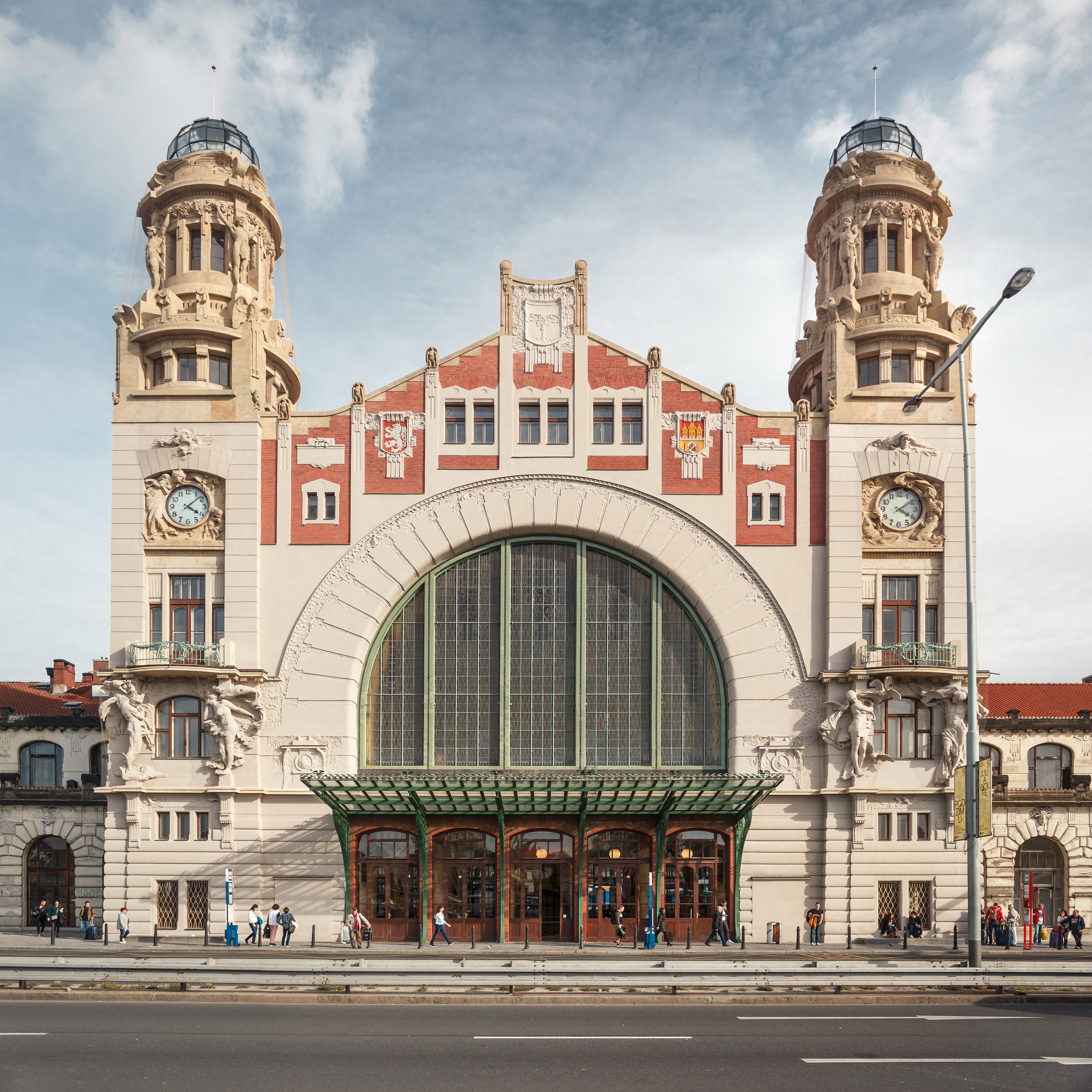
1909 Art Nouveau station building in 2017

At the beginning of the twentieth century, the capacity of the original building and track was no longer sufficient for the development of the railway, so the station was therefore rebuilt and enlarged. The Art Nouveau station building and station hall were built between 1901 and 1909, designed by Czech architect Josef Fanta on the site of the old dismantled Neo-Renaissance station designed by Czech architects Antonín Viktor Barvitius and Vojtěch Ignác Ullmann.

The dome above the main part of the building is decorated with art nouveau motifs and sculptures by Stanislav Sucharda and Ladislav Šaloun depicting Czech cities. The cash desks were located on the ground floor of the dome in the premises of today's cafe. Passengers were served by generously designed waiting rooms in the left wing of the building and two restaurants of different price levels. From the beginning, the building also had offices and lounges for important guests, where for example Tomáš Masaryk, Thomas Edison, Le Corbusier or Charlie Chaplin waited for the train. The lounges were luxuriously furnished, decorated with sculptures and large-scale paintings with motifs of Prague and Karlštejn from the studios of Václav Jansa and Viktor Stretti. The lounges are closed to the public and are used for special occasions or are rented out for commercial purposes. Underpasses were built together with the new building, the railway yard was roofed in 1905–1906 by a two-nave steel arched hall with a span of 2 x 33.3 m, a height of 18 m and a length of 233 m, the authors of which were Jaroslav Marjanko and Rudolf Kornfeld. The construction was made by the S. Bondy bridge factory in Bubny. The hall covers the current platforms no. 1 to 4, platform no. 1A is pushed out from the main roof to the Vinohrady headland, the later built platforms 5 to 7 have their own roof, which in shape refers to the structure of the hall.

=== 20th-century electrification and expansion ===
As early as 1910, the Austrian Ministry of Transport began to consider the electrification of the railways in Vienna and Prague. At that time, the businessman Emil Kolben made an offer to the Austro-Hungarian State Railways to electrify the Prague junctions with a 10 kV 16 Hz system, but it was not accepted. The Ministry of Railways of the Czechoslovak Republic began to deal with the idea of electrification again immediately after its establishment. At the beginning of 1924, a direct current system of 1500 V was chosen as the optimal one. On 12 August 1926, in the presence of František Křižík and locomotive E 407.001, construction work was ceremonially started. On 23 April 1928, a shift to electric traction began at Wilson station, and on 27 April, electric traction passenger trains started to Vysočany. With the new timetable, regular electric operation on all electrified lines began on 15 May 1928. Power supply and charging of battery locomotives was provided by the Křenovka transformer station. The locomotives were deposited in the boiler room at Wilson Station, which was railed.

After the First World War, the line to Smíchov was double-tracked. In 1926, the monorail connection Vítkov – Prague-Libeň railway station was completed; Vítkov track), which completed the monorail coupling on the other side of the hill, via Hrabovka, in 1872.

In 1940 to 1944, the second Vinohradský tunnel was built. All traffic was transferred to it so that the reconstruction of the first tunnel could be carried out. After its completion, the tracks to Vršovice and Smíchov were definitively divided.

=== Construction of the subway, new vestibule and highway (1967–1979) ===
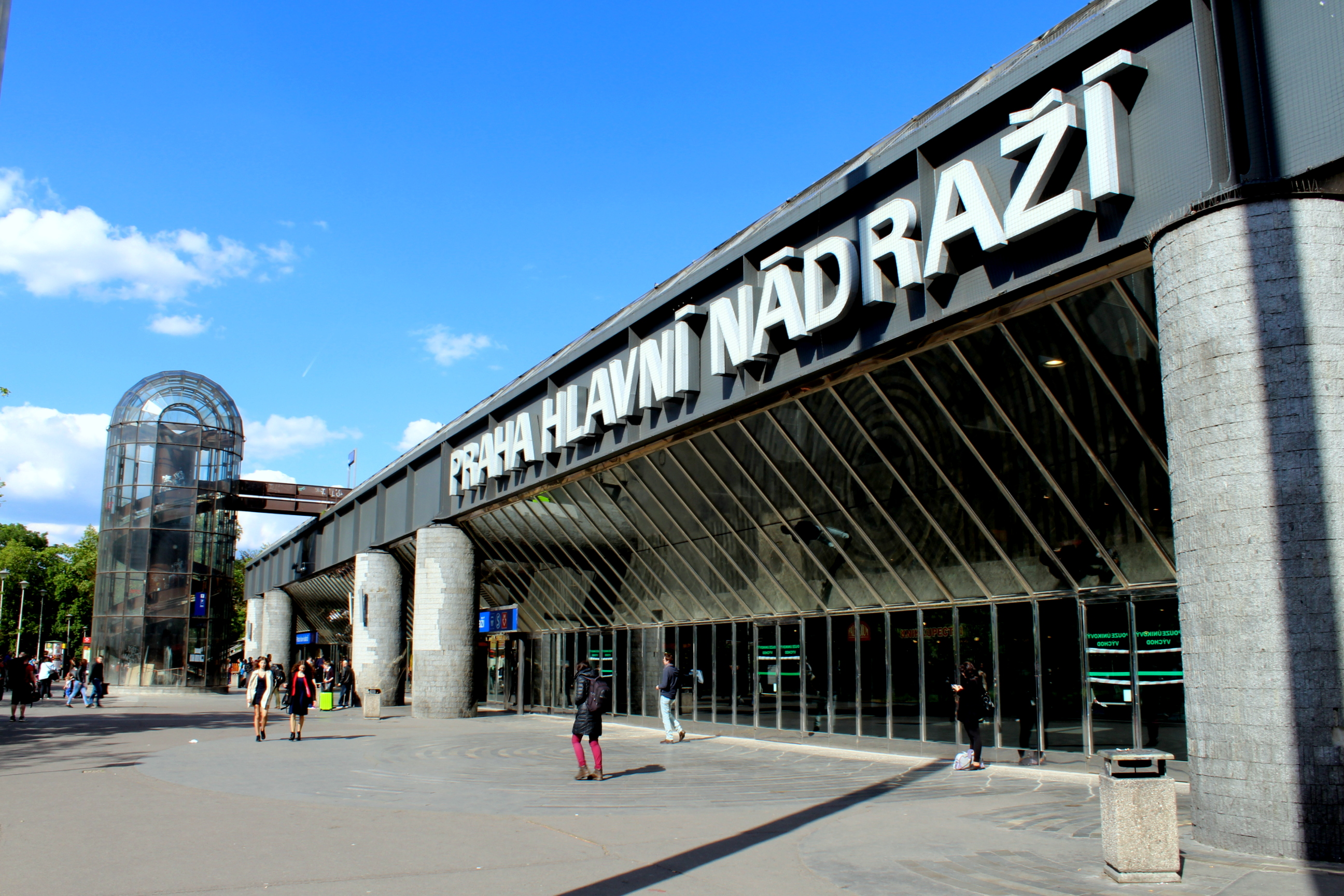
The facade of the new building from Vrchlické sady

After the Second World War, a number of studies were prepared for the reconstruction of the station in connection with the increase of its capacity. Josef Danda was particularly involved in them. In 1948, Josef Danda and Antonín Bloman prepared a study predicting the extension of the track to the area of the historic building and its replacement with a new building. In the years 1948–1956, other proposals were created (authors Josef Danda, Cyril Suk, collectives of the project institutes SUDOP Prague and Stavoprojekt). In 1950, a competition was held for the overall solution of the central station, including an underground railway. At the beginning of the 1960s, an internal competition took place in SUDOP (in which designs were created by architects Homoláč and Reiterman, Jaroslav Otruba, and Josef Danda). In 1965, a public competition was announced, in which the design of the collective Eugen Kramár, Berta Hornema, J. Gerstbrein won, proposing the abolition of the historic building. In 1970, an open architectural competition was announced for the design of the check-in hall, in which the design of architects Jan Šrámek, Jan Bočan and Alena Šrámková won in the second round, which was finally implemented.

The station was extended by a new terminal building, built between 1972 and 1979, including an underground metro station and a main road on the roof of the terminal. The new terminal building claimed a large part of the park, and the construction of the road cut off the neo-renaissance station hall from the town.

In 1976, the Department of Culture of the National Committee of the Capital City of Prague decided, on the proposal of the Prague Centre for State Heritage Care and Nature Protection, that object No. 300 (Fanta's building) is an immovable cultural monument and is entered into the state list of immovable cultural monuments.

An underground tram can be seen on the design from 1948. Competitions for the form of modifications took place between 1950 and 1965. On 15 March 1967, the construction of the Hlavní nádraží metro station (the first and oldest metro station in Prague) began, according to the first plans, as an underground tramway. The government decided to build a subway instead of a tram only after the start of construction, in August 1967, which is why the less typical station has two side platforms instead of one in the middle.

On 9 May 1974, the metro station Hlavní nádraží started operating. From 1972 to 1979, a new underground check-in hall was created on the basis of an architectural competition (stylistically classified as brutalism), which gave way to a part of the existing Vrchlické sady. The authors of the new building were Josef Danda, Jan Bočan, Julie Trnková and Alena Šrámková and Jan Šrámek. The North-South highway runs along the roof of the hall, thus cutting off the historic building from the surroundings.

=== Track reconstruction (1983–1994) ===
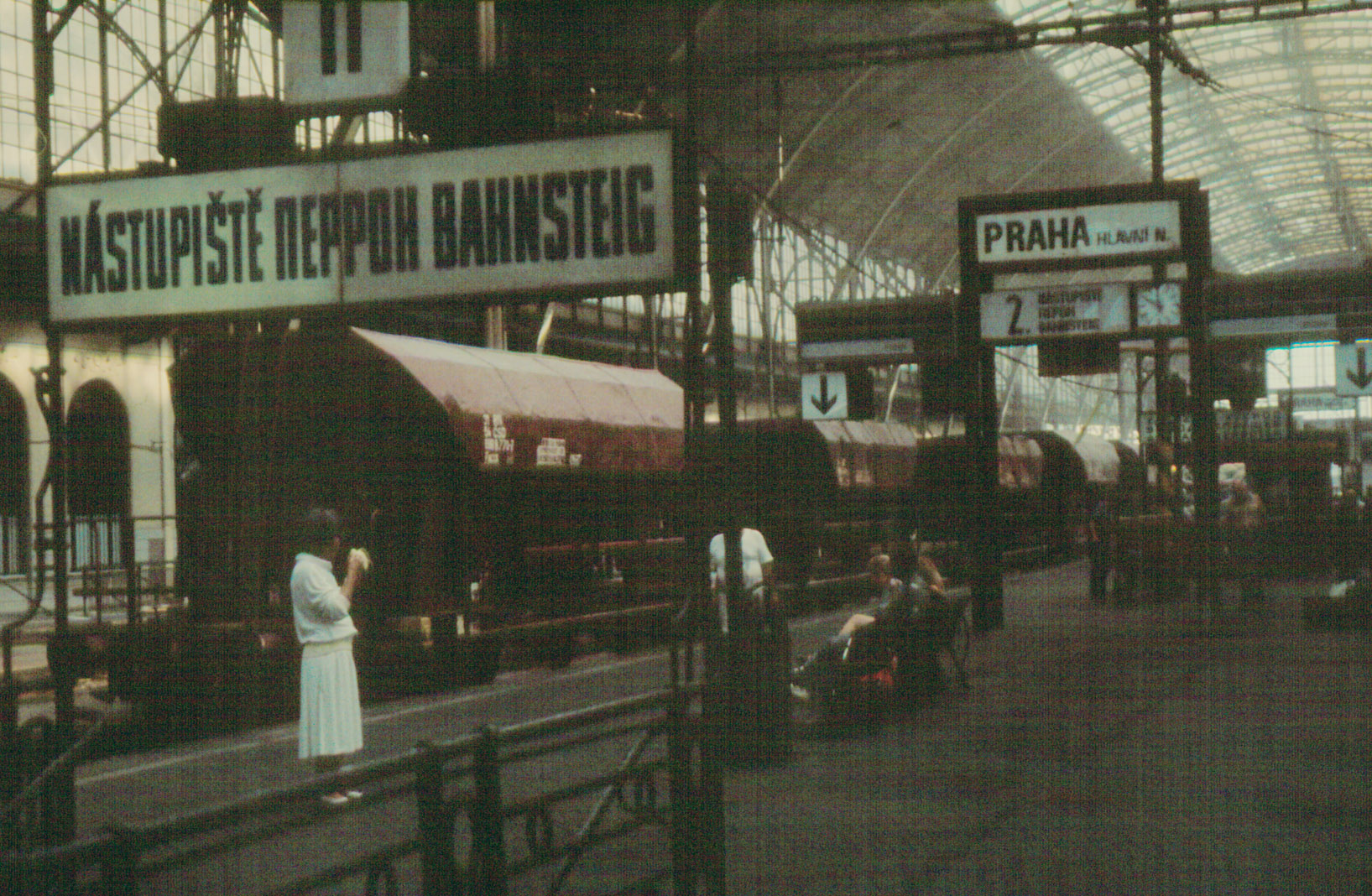
2nd platform during reconstruction in July 1992

In the years 1983–1989, the third Vinohradsky tunnel was completed on the south side of the station, which was already under construction in the 1940s. In 1985, the switches and safety equipment were reconstructed on the northern head. Until then, mechanical traffic lights worked here, and switches were rebuilt manually. The Sakrabonka signal box standing on the site of the former homestead of the same name, which gave way in 1870 to the construction of the railway station, was demolished. In 1994, three more platforms were opened at the main station, with numbers 5 to 7 having separate vaulted roofs. The reconstruction of the northeastern head of the main station was completed in 2005.

=== Construction of the New Connection (2006–2017) ===
The technical condition of the station was poor at the beginning of the 21st century, the historic building was dilapidated, the underground vestibule did not meet current requirements, and the track did not meet the capacity or permitted speed. The Czech branch of the Italian company Grandi Stazioni was supposed to lease the station from the then owner – České dráhy – for a 30-year lease in exchange for its complete reconstruction. The station track and with it the historic steel hall (except for the 1st platform) remained in the property of the Správa železnic, which carried out reconstruction activities independently of the Grandi Stazioni. Together, since 2006, under the direction of Grandi Stazioni, it has been possible to modernize the underground check-in hall and the central part of the historic Art Nouveau building (the SŽDC was preparing the reconstruction of other parts of the building) and at the same time, under the baton of the SŽDC, the opening of the Nové spojení and the associated reconstruction of the underpasses and platforms 1–4 took place, and finally, after a pause of several years, the repair and glazing of the historic hall above the platforms.

==== Reconstruction of tracks and platforms ====
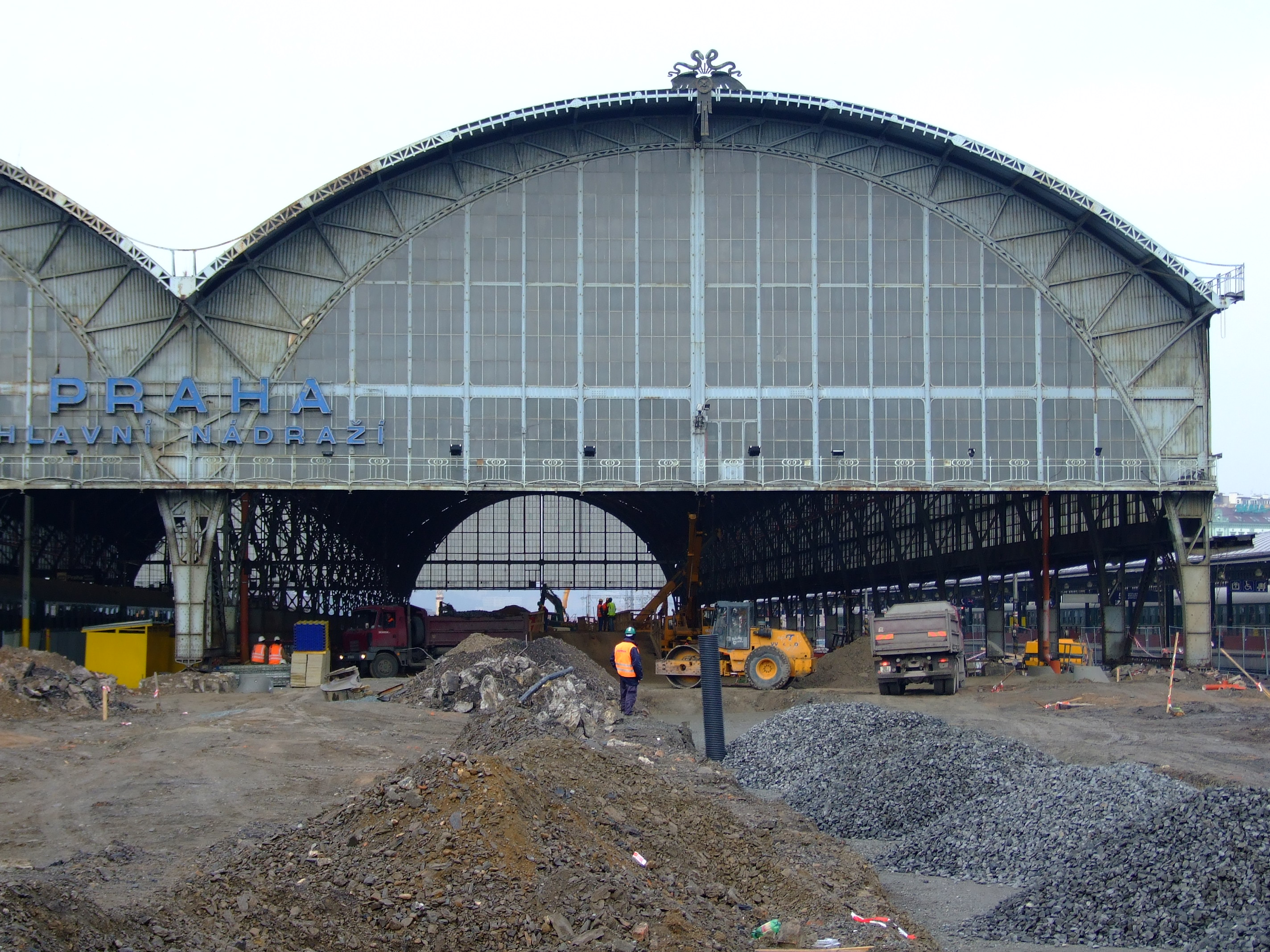
Reconstruction of the subway and platforms 1 to 4 (2008–2009)

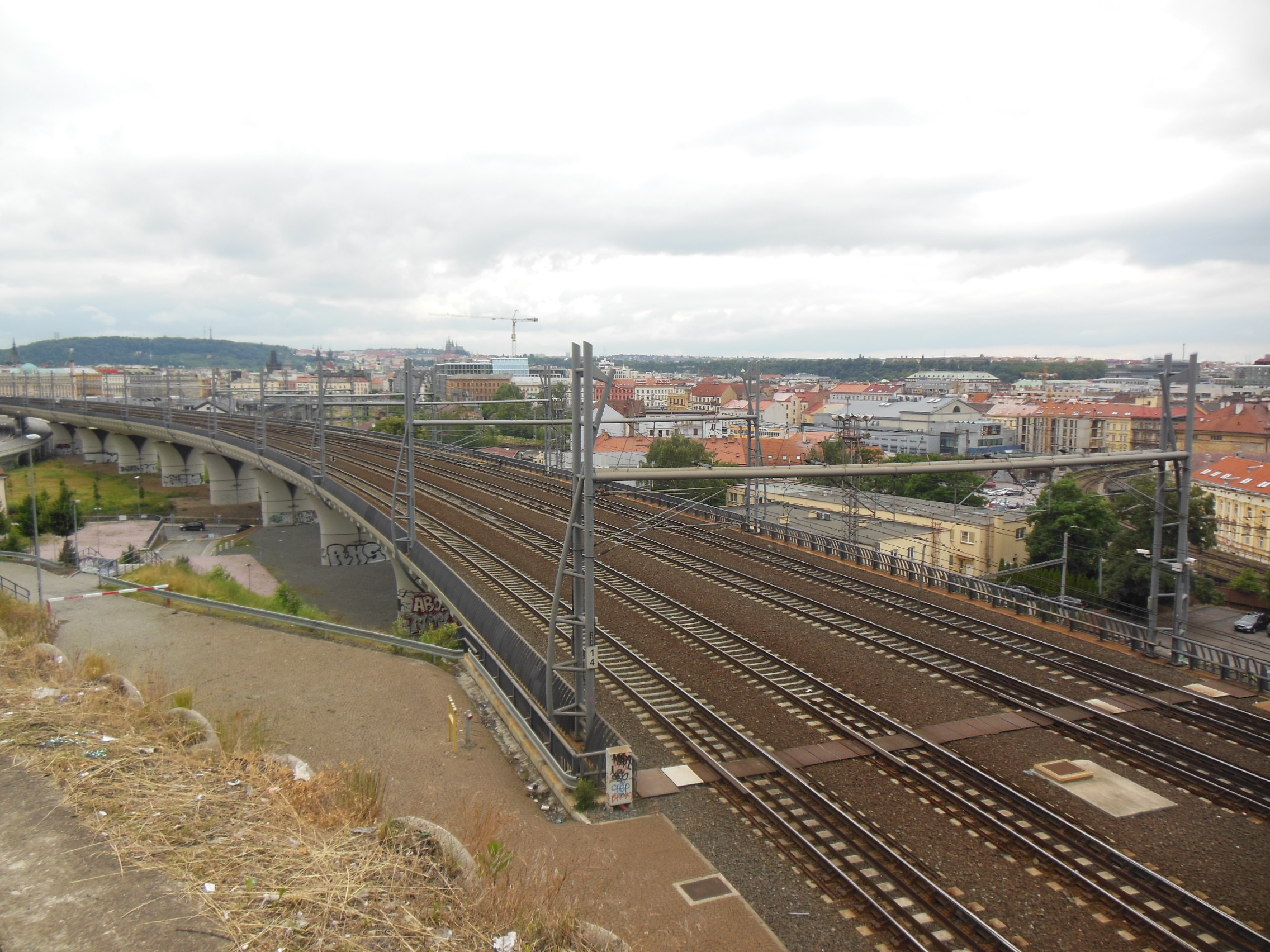
The 438 m long overpass leading to the Main Station is part of the Nové spojení

Due to the construction of the New Connection and the moral obsolescence of many technical and construction units, SŽDC implemented several consecutive projects. To enable the connection to the future New Connection, new bridges over Seifertova Street were built in advance in 2002, from 1 July 2004 to 31 May 2010, the construction of the New Connection took place in cooperation with it from 7 January 2008 to 30 April 2009 modernization the western part of the main station. This included the construction of new platforms 1 to 4, including a shelter over parts of the platforms outside the historic hall. The underpasses, in which escalators and elevators were installed, also underwent reconstruction. At the same time as these works, the reconstruction of the track, traction line and safety equipment and the reconstruction of the entire northern head for the mouth of the New Connection flyover was also taking place.

The overall reconstruction of the historic steel hall above the platform was omitted for financial reasons, only emergency conditions were dealt with and the necessary repairs to column bases, reconstruction of roof gutters and drainage, replacement of damaged skylight glass and installation of new inspection gangways were carried out.

==== Reconstruction of the historic platform hall ====
From 30 October 2014 to September 2017 the reconstruction of the historic steel two-nave hall on platforms 1–4 was underway. The work was divided into two investment projects and for organizational reasons into several stages in order to minimize the number of excluded tracks and platforms. The reconstruction included repair of corrosion and static damage to the supporting structure, replacement of damaged parts with replicas, overhaul and reglazing of all skylights, and replacement of roofing. The structure was cleaned of old coatings and provided with a three-layer anti-corrosion coating. Several parts of the structure had to be completely replaced due to current static load-bearing standards (such as purlins under skylights and parts damaged by corrosion). The reconstruction respected the historical form as much as possible, but compromises had to be made - the original roofing with corrugated sheets was replaced with trapezoidal ones, because corrugated sheets in the required design were no longer available. The new parts were no longer riveted, but bolted together with custom made rivet screws and closed nuts to match the original look and rivet position as closely as possible. The reconstruction focused on improving the lighting conditions inside the hall.

== Present ==
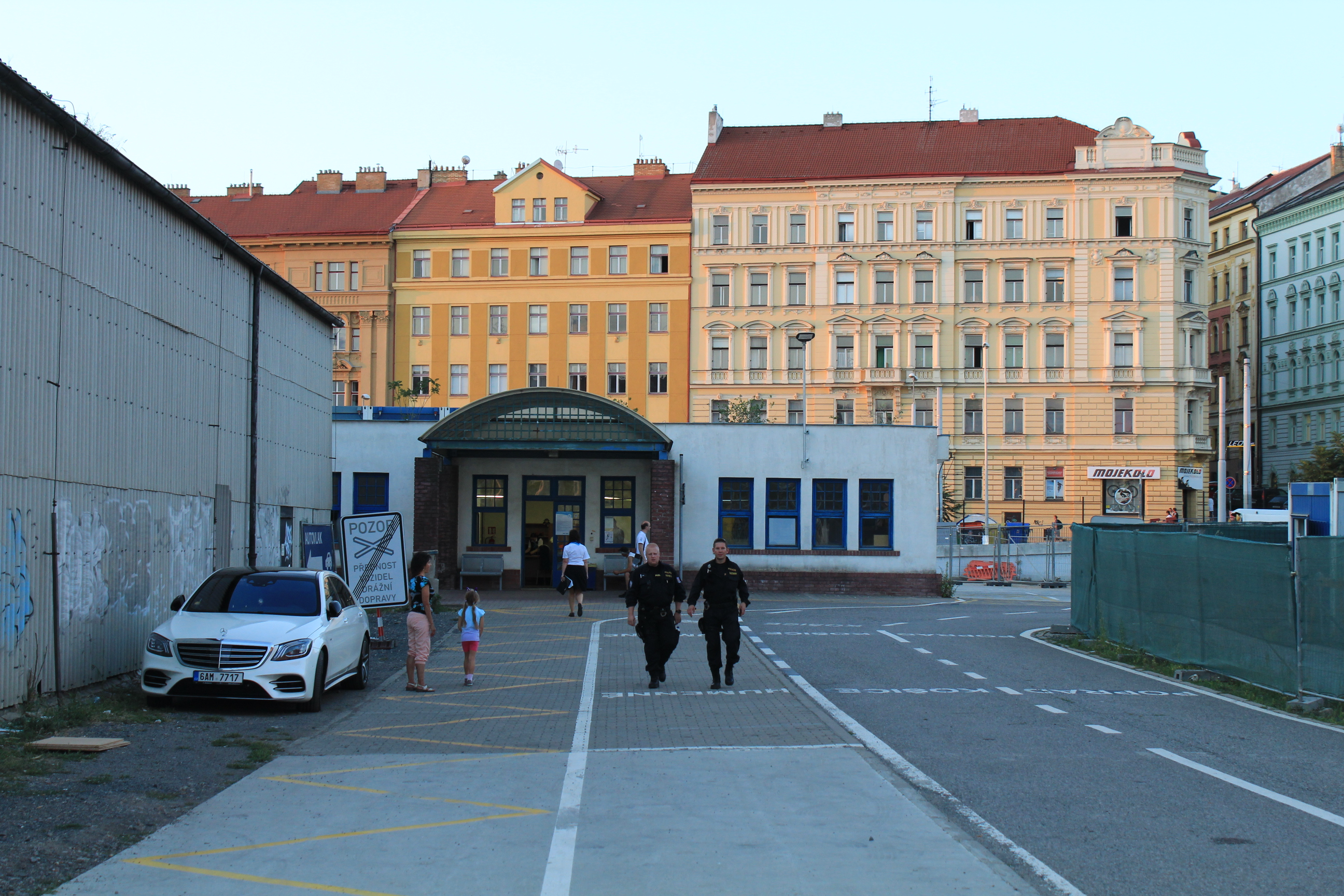
Railroad car terminal building, 2018

The main station consists of several buildings. The main one is the underground check-in hall from 1977 with dimensions of approximately 120 by 60 m (390 by 200 ft). The subway can also be accessed through the main entrance. The underground hall is divided into two floors, where there are shops, restaurants and fast food, ticket counters, seating and other services such as showers, toilets, exchange offices, ATMs, bike and luggage storage. The Fant building, which was previously used for passenger check-in, is also accessible to the public. It currently houses a cafe, seating, access to the 1st platform and to the main road - to the bus stop and parking.

In the lower part of the underground hall there are ticket offices and information counters České dráhy (ČD Centrum), where tickets for public transport are sold. Next to it are the ticket offices of RegioJet and LEO Express. For passengers of higher classes and higher quality ČD trains (e.g. SuperCity), there is a lounge and waiting room (ČD Lounge) dedicated to Sir Nicholas Winton.

Trains are boarded via 9 platforms and a total of 16 boarding edges. There are 3 subways leading to the platforms from the second floor of the underground hall - south, central (main) and north. To the east of the platforms there is a terminal used for loading or unloading cars onto the Railroad car. From 19 June 2023, the station's security equipment is remotely controlled from CDP Prague.

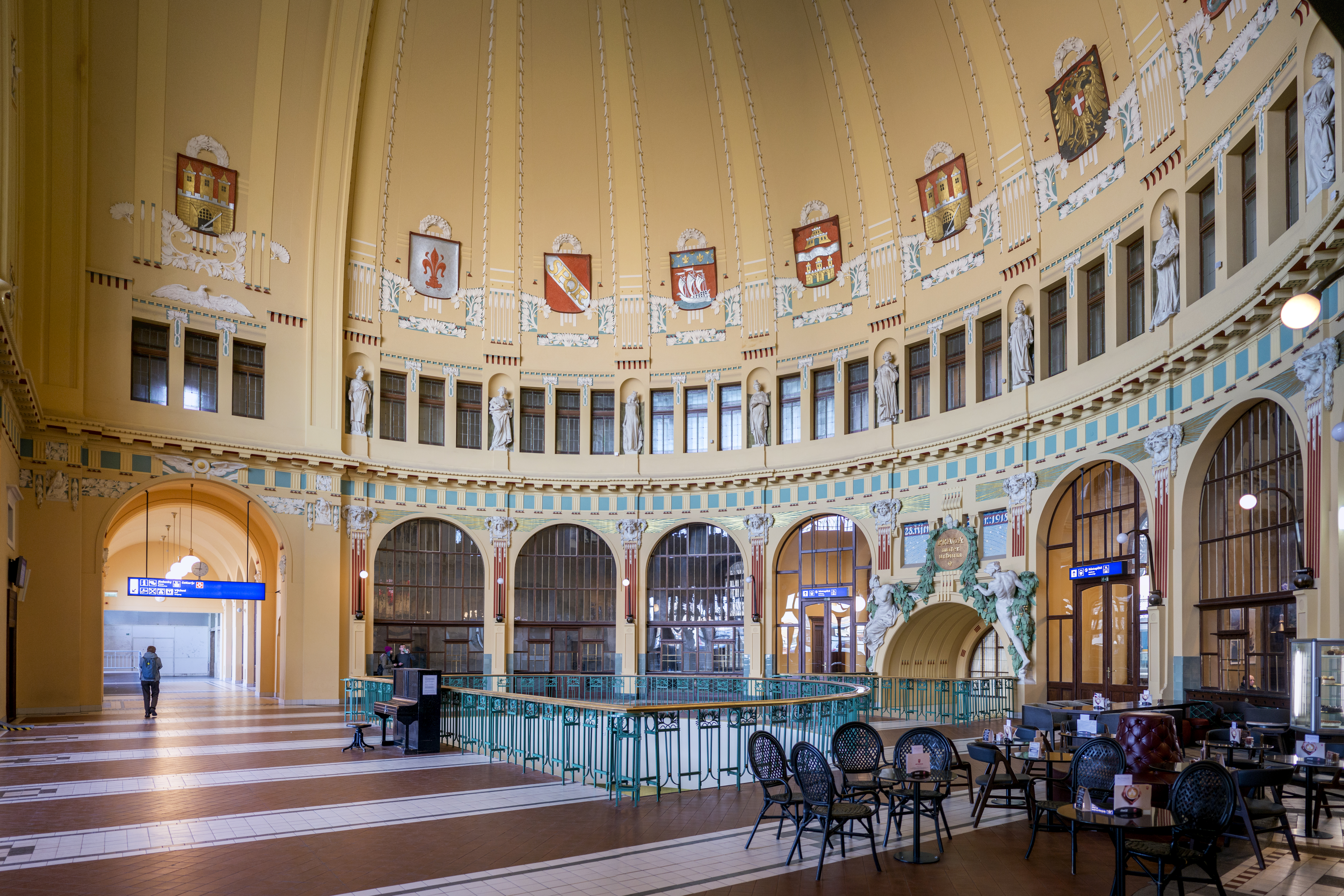
The main hall of the Art-Nouveau station building (Fantova budova)

In 2011 a partial refurbishment of the station was completed by Italian company Grandi Stazioni, which had leased retail space for 30 years from 2002. In 2016 Grandi Stazioni lost the concession after failing to complete the renovation of the historic building by the extended contractual deadline.

In September 2021, a second exit was opened connecting the station to Winston Churchill Square in Žižkov via an underpass.

=== Memorials of Nicholas Winton ===
The station was the embarkation point for the children evacuated to London Liverpool Street station via the Port of Harwich by Nicholas Winton. In 2009, a commemoration statue was unveiled on platform 1. After his death, there was even a brief consideration of renaming the entire station after him.

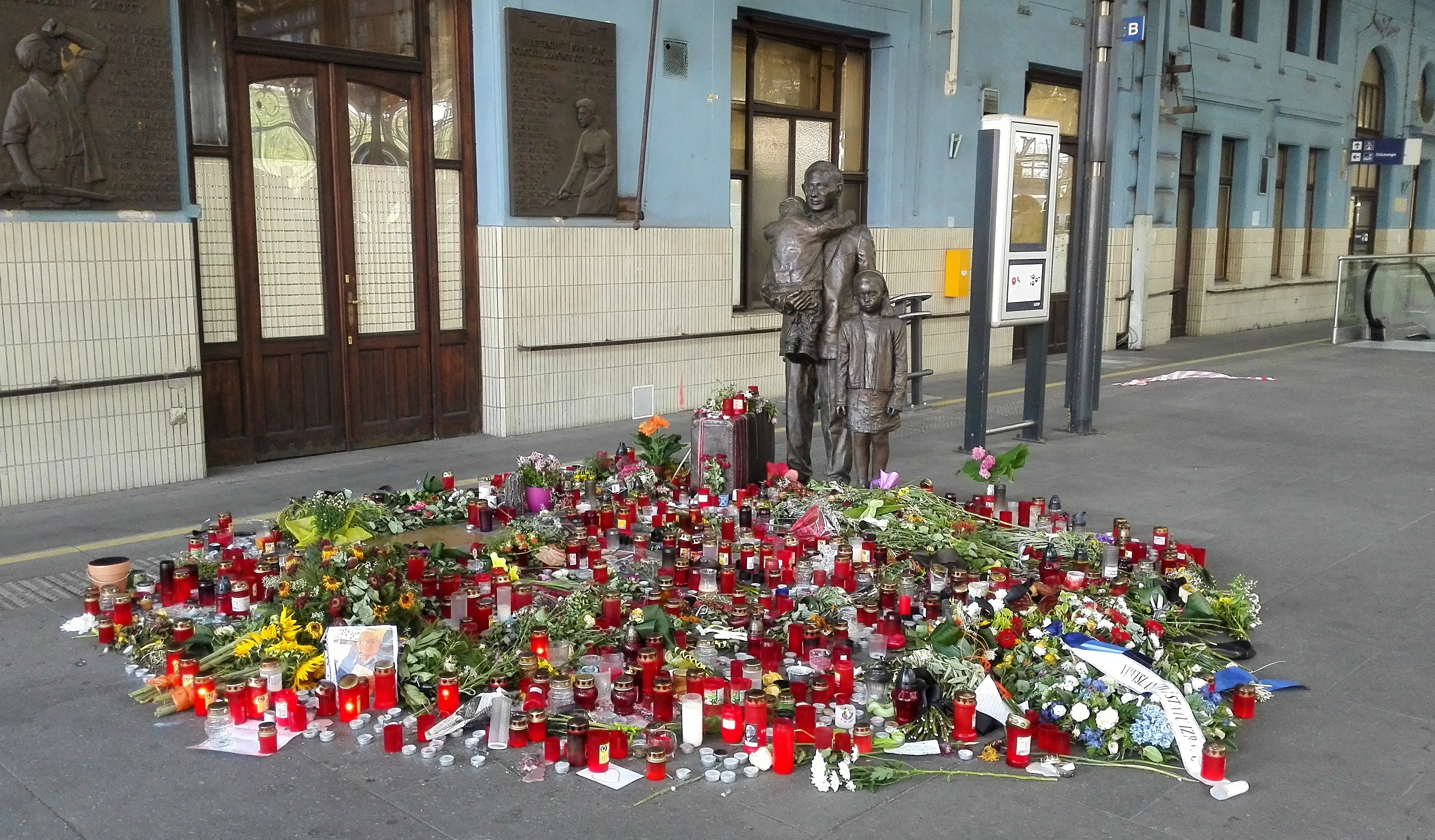
Statue of Nicholas Winton and the rescued children on Platform 1 (July 2015)

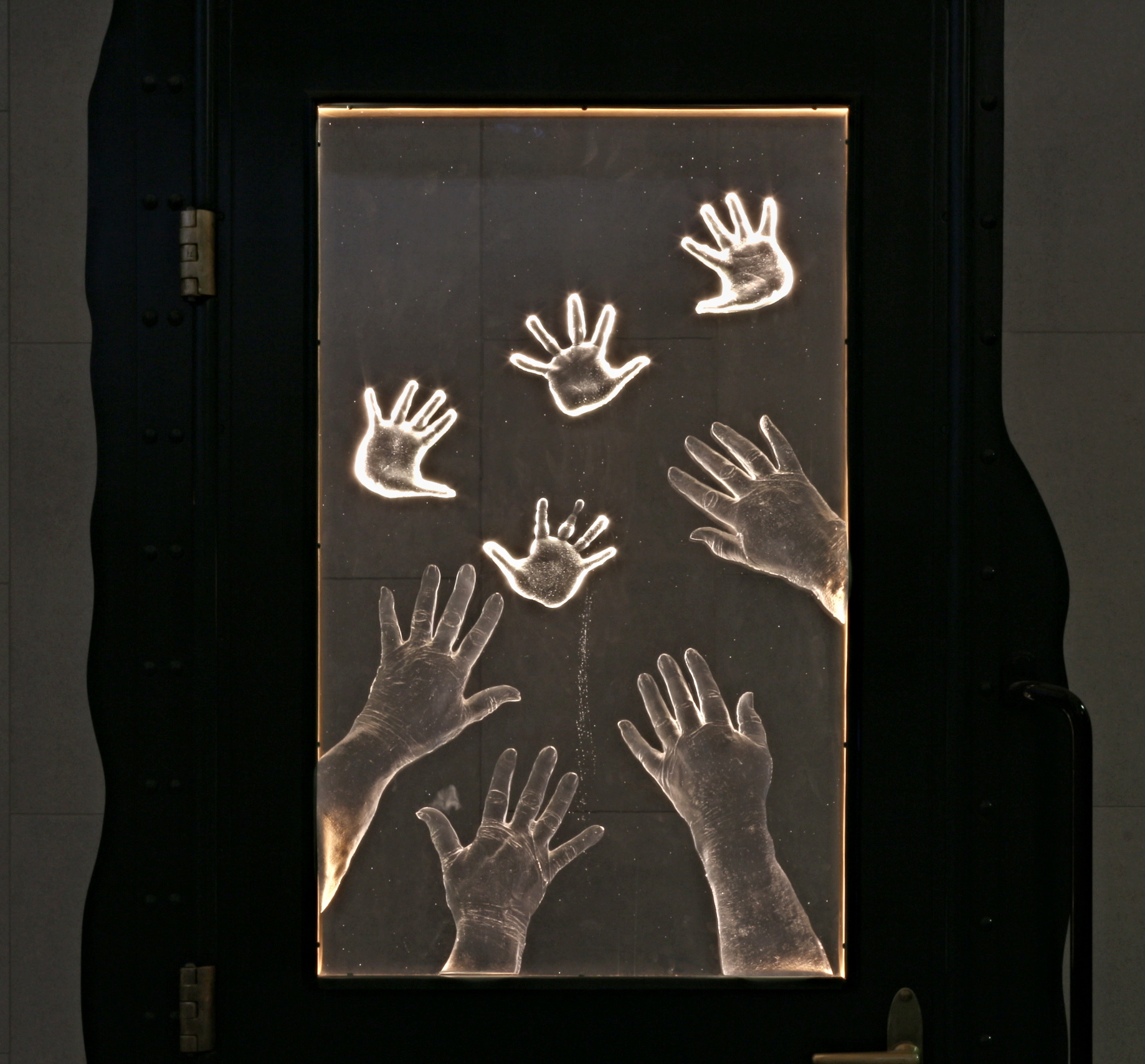
Farewell Memorial in the underpass

On platform 1 stands a statue of Winton with two children and a suitcase. He sent 669 mostly Jewish children by train to the United Kingdom in early 1939 to avoid the Nazis and deportations to concentration camps. The ceremonial unveiling took place on 1 September 2009, on the occasion of the departure of the Winton Train, traveling along the same route as the trains that the children Winton saved once used to leave Czechoslovakia. The author of the sculptures is Flor Kentová.

The sculpture is complemented by a plaque with the inscription: "Dedicated with deep gratitude to Sir Nicholas Winton and all the compassionate people who saved 669 children from the horrors of World War II by 8 train transports to Great Britain in 1939 and in memory of the 15,131 Czechoslovak children murdered in concentration camps."

On 27 May 2017, a new monument associated with Winton, the Farewell Memorial, was unveiled in the central underpass. It is dedicated to the parents of rescued children, and consists of a memorial plaque and a replica of a train door with casts of the hands of children and parents, commemorating the last farewell of children to their parents, who often never saw their children again. The memorial was unveiled by Winton's children, Zuzana Marešová and Lady Milena Grenfell-Baines, who along with their great-grandchildren provided hand casts for the glass inset of the door. It was made by glassblower Jan Huňát. The monument was financed from a public collection that took place in the Czech Republic and the United Kingdom from March 2016.

Since 11 July 2017, the newly opened waiting room of the Czech Railways also bears Winton's name. Winton is remembered by the interior decoration with a photograph, a quote, a replica of the monument from the underpass, and on the facade the signatures of four of Winton's children who attended the opening ceremony - Zuzana Marešová, Milena Lady Grenffelová-Bainesová, Jiří Kafka and Benjamin Abeles.

=== Transport accessibility ===
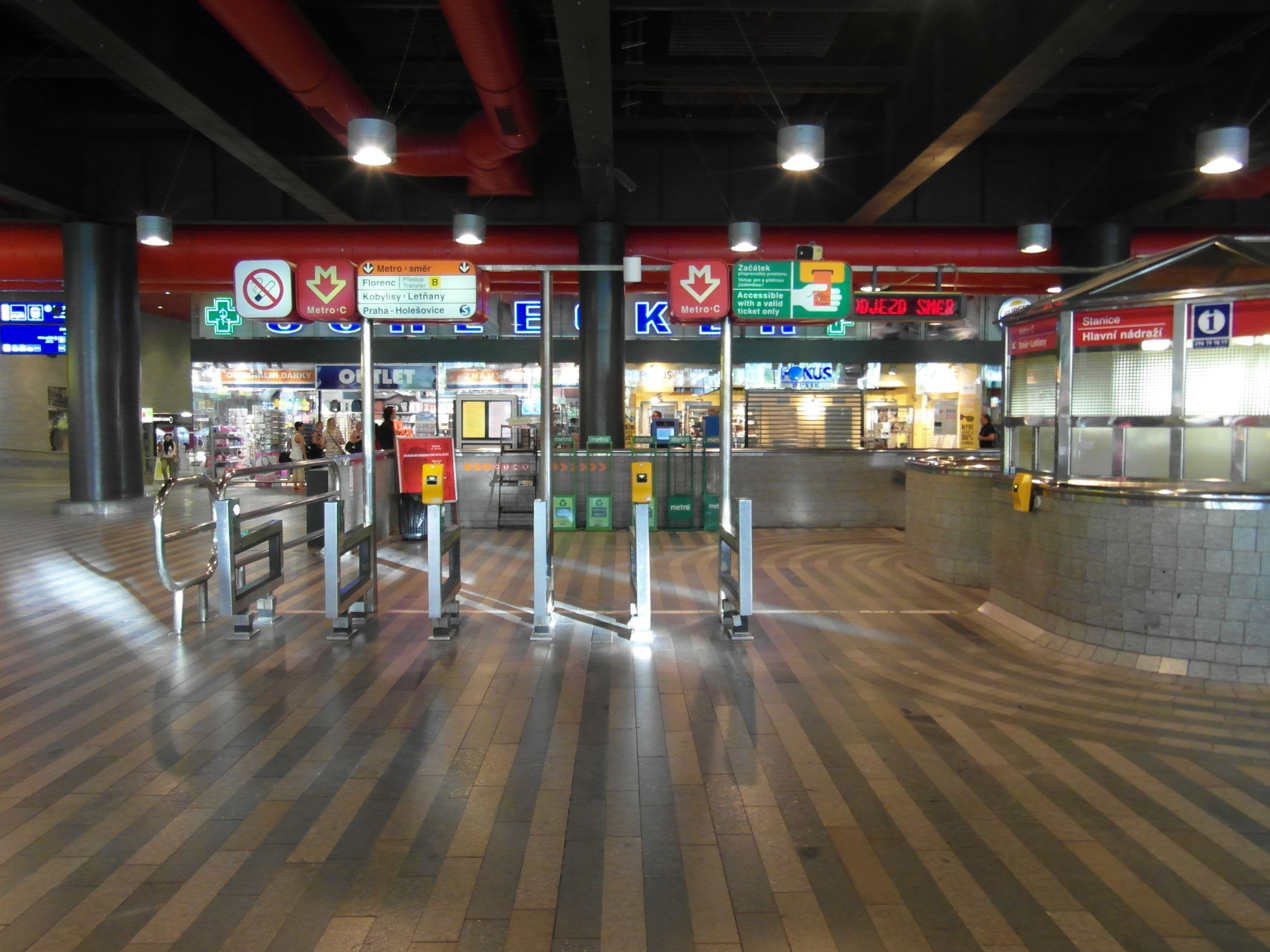
Access to metro C in the arrivals hall

Line C of the Prague metro leads to the Hlavní nádraží station. Access to it is located in the underground check-in hall. Trams are available from the stop "Hlavní nádraží", which is located in Bolzanova street approximately 250 meters from the station exit. There is also a bus stop above the new station hall, in front of the entrance to the historic building near the North-South Main Line, from which various international and domestic lines depart, including the night lines 905 and 911, and depart for Václav Havel Airport Prague every 15 to 30 minutes on the Airport Express. There is also a paid parking lot and a taxi stand. The Praha Masarykovo nádraží station is also nearby, it is 500 meters away as the crow flies and a 10-minute walk. Of the three pedestrian underpasses under the platform, the northernmost is the one leading to the Žižkov and Vinohrady (Prague) districts. From its exit, there is a stop of bus line No. 135 at a distance of about 350 m, and a stop of bus line No. 101 at a distance of about 400 m.

== Criticisms ==
The park in front of the station (officially Vrchlické sady, popularly called Sherwood) is frequented by homeless people and drug addicts and the place is also notorious as a crossroads of male homosexual prostitution. The park belongs to Prague 1. The latter was supposed to start the reconstruction of the park already in 2009, but the reconstruction has not taken place as of 2015. Previously, it was not even safe in the area of the check-in hall itself, but after the reconstruction completed in 2011, the situation improved significantly.

Despite the extension of the platforms and the expansion of the track, the station is criticized for its insufficient capacity, which is why it cannot accommodate some suburban lines.

== Train services ==
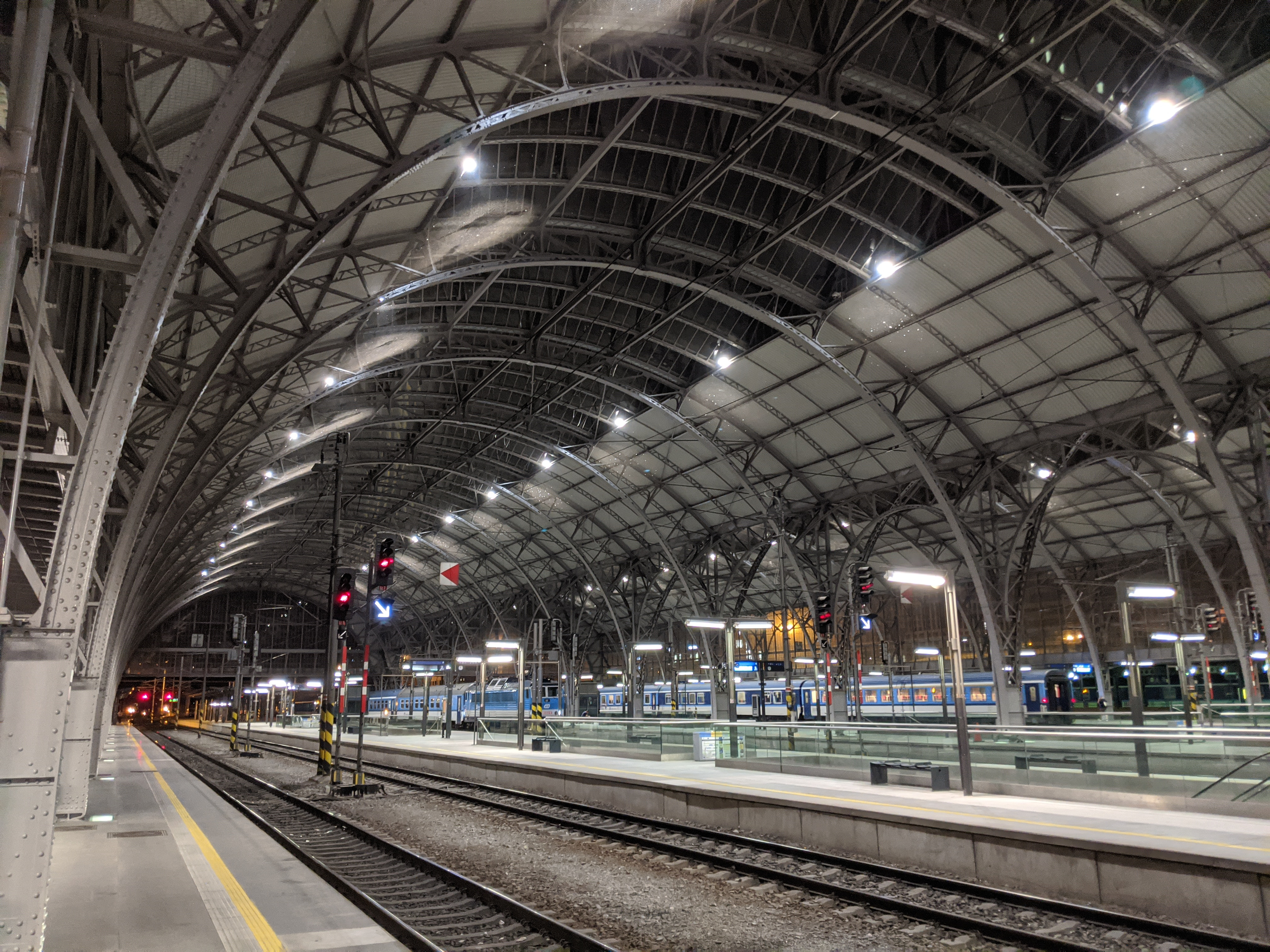
Platforms at the main train station

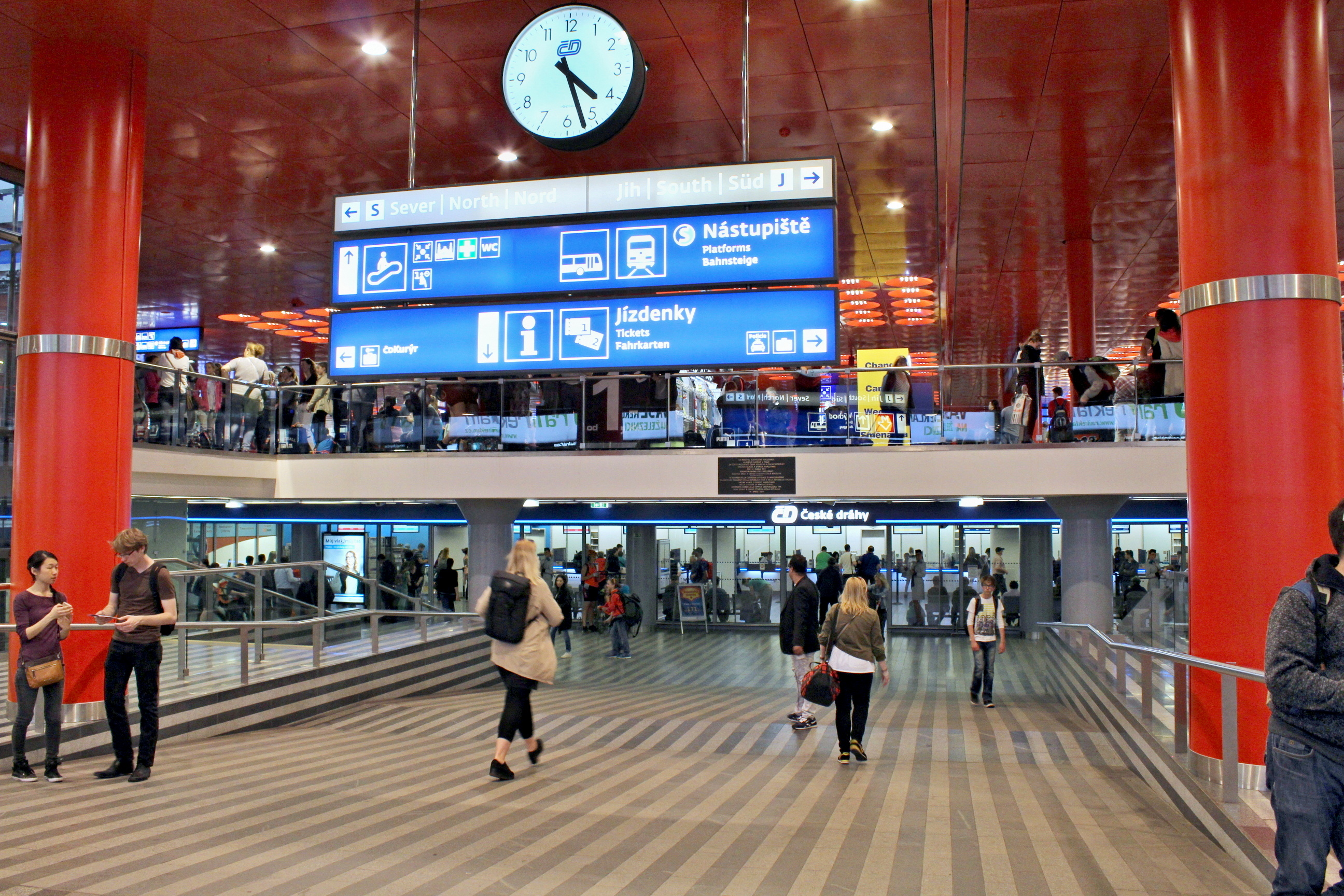
Interior of the new Terminal building completed in 1977, refurbished in 2011

=== Long-distance services ===
The station is an international transport hub, handling services to Germany (Munich, Bavaria-Bohemia RE (Regio-Express) services, and EuroCity/EuroNight services to Berlin, Dresden and Hamburg), Poland, Slovakia, Austria, Hungary, Switzerland, Ukraine, and Croatia in summer. Services are operated by express trains, and also by ČD Class 680 Pendolino. Services are operated by Czech Railways and by open-access train operators LEO Express, RegioJet, and Arriva.

=== Regional services ===
In addition to international services, trains serve most of the larger Czech cities, such as Brno, Plzeň, České Budějovice, and Olomouc.

=== Suburban services ===
The station is served by most of the Esko Prague lines which are not dispatched from the nearby Masarykovo nádraží station.

== Intercity bus services ==
Buses towards Český Krumlov, České Budějovice, Tábor and other Czech cities, as well as the Airport Express bus service to Václav Havel Airport Prague maintained by České dráhy, depart from Wilsonova street in front of the historical building.

== City transport at the station ==
The station is served by the Prague Metro's Line C directly in the area, and by the Prague tram system outside the station about 500 meters past the park in front of the new terminal.

== See also ==
- Nové spojení
