= České Budějovice railway station =

Railway station in České Budějovice, Czech Republic

České Budějovice
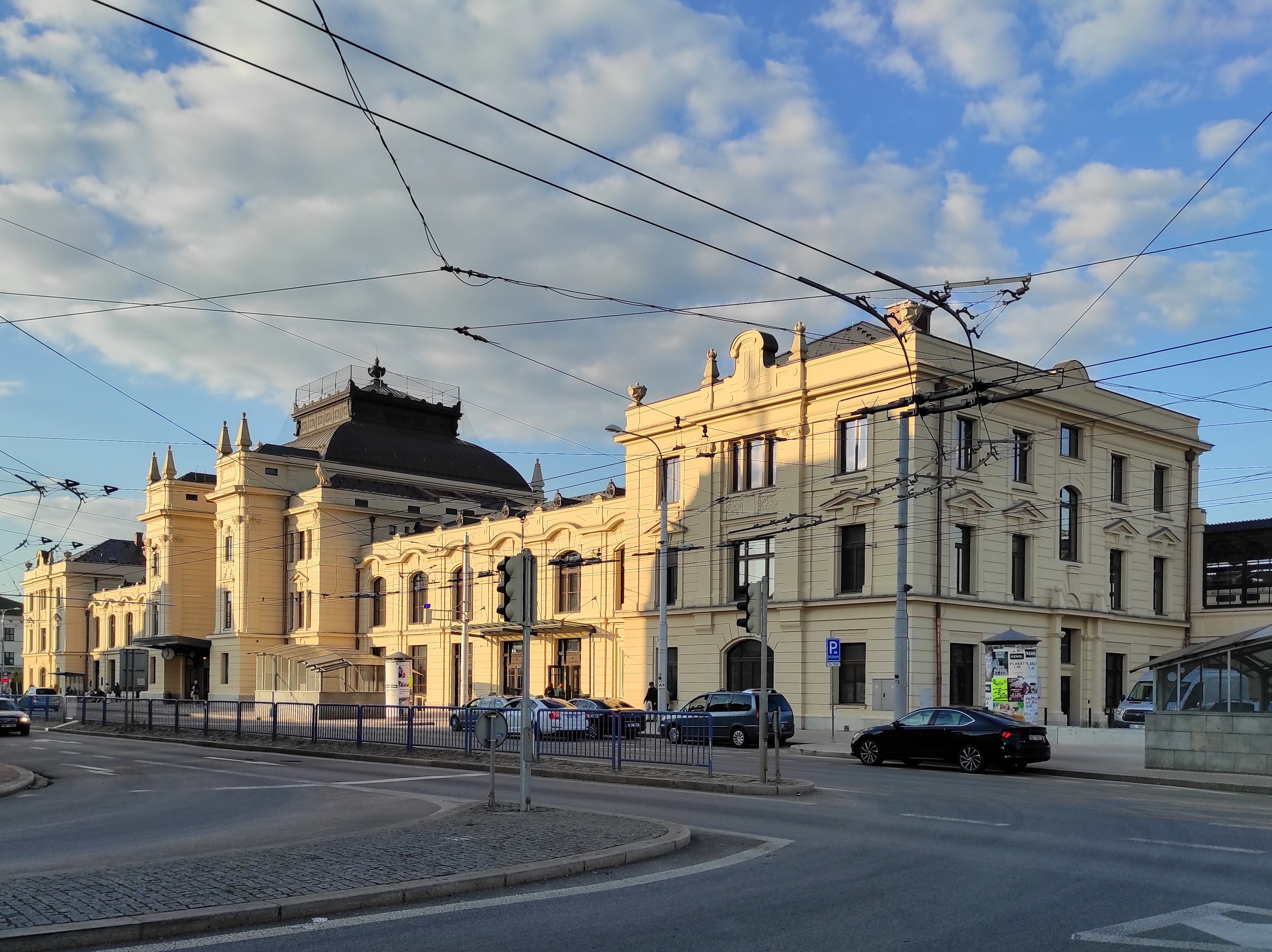
- The station building from Nádražní street

General information
- Location: Nádražní, České Budějovice; Czech Republic
- Coordinates: 48°58′27″N 14°29′17″E
- Owner: Czech Republic
- Lines: Plzeň–České Budějovice; České Budějovice–Černý Kříž; St. Valentin–České Budějovice; České Velenice–České Budějovice; Prague–České Budějovice
- Platforms: 4
- Connections: Trolleybuses, buses

Construction
- Architect: Gustav Kulhavý
- Architectural style: Neo-Renaissance

Other information
- Station code: 54732826

History
- Opened: 1868
- Rebuilt: 1908
- Electrified: 1968
Location

České Budějovice railway station (Czech: Železniční stanice České Budějovice) is a mainline railway station and marshalling yard in České Budějovice in the Czech Republic. It is located at the junction of an international corridor leading from Prague south to Linz in Austria with several domestic lines. The Neo-Renaissance station building, completed in 1908, is located on Nádražní street, a short walk east of the old town. Most passenger services are operated by Czech Railways but some are operated by Arriva.

== History ==
The history of rail transport in České Budějovice began as early as 1828 with the opening of a horse-drawn railway to Linz, but it was not until 1868 when a new line to Plzeň was opened that a station was built for locomotives. At the beginning of the 20th century, as the railways continued to grow, a much larger station was constructed on the same tracks a short distance north of the old one. The station building was designed by Gustav Kulhavý in Neo-Renaissance style and constructed by J. M. Kohler & son. It was opened in 1908, and the first train to call at the station was an express train from Trieste to Prague on 17 December of that year.

== Reconstruction ==
In 2016, the station was acquired by the Railway Infrastructure Administration Company (Cz: Správa železniční dopravní cesty, or SŽDC), who plan to renovate the station at a cost of approximately 150 million Czech koruna, with work beginning in 2018.

== Services ==
The station is served by one express route and three long-distance routes operated by Czech Railways.

Preceding station	České dráhy	Following station
Velešín město towards Linz Hbf	EC	Tábor towards Praha hl.n.
Český Krumlov Terminus	IC	Tábor towards Praha hl.n.
Číčenice towards Bayerisch Eisenstein	R	Terminus
Číčenice towards Plzeň main	R	Veselí nad Lužnicí towards Brno main
Terminus	R	Veselí nad Lužnicí towards Praha hl.n.
České Budějovice sev.z. towards Písek	Sp	Terminus
České Budějovice již.z. towards Linz Hbf	Sp	Terminus
Terminus	Os	Nové Hodějovice towards České Velenice
České Budějovice sev.z. towards Strakonice	Os	Terminus
Preceding station	Arriva vlaky	Following station
Terminus	R26	Zliv towards Praha hl.n.
Preceding station	GW Train Regio	Following station
České Budějovice již.z. towards Nové Údolí or Volary	Os	Terminus
