= Správa železnic =

- Company type: State-owned enterprise
- Industry: Infrastructure & Tracks Proprietor, State Administrator
- Founded: 1 January 2003
- Headquarters: Prague, Czech Republic
- Area served: Czech Republic
- Revenue: 36,179,275,000 Czech koruna (2024)
- Operating income: −1,675,313,000 Czech koruna (2024)
- Net income: −1,093,000,000 Czech koruna (2017)
- Total assets: 52,984,417,000 Czech koruna (2024)
- Number of employees: 16,734 (2024)
- Website: www.spravazeleznic.cz

Správa železnic, státní organizace (lit. 'Railway Administration', formerly the Správa železniční dopravní cesty – SŽDC) is the national railway infrastructure manager in the Czech Republic. Its main customers include passenger train operator České dráhy and its cargo subsidiary ČD Cargo.

== History ==
During the 1990s, there was a noticeable drop in railway traffic throughout the Czech Republic, a phenomenon that coincided with a massive expansion in road transport. Seeking to halt, or even partially reverse, this trend, substantial efforts were made to restructure and modernise the railways and their operation. Správa železnic was founded with the restructuring of ČD from 1 January 2003 (it was called Správa železniční dopravní cesty, státní organizace or SŽDC up until 1 January 2020). Prior to 2008, much of the operations, maintenance and renewals activities was contracted back to ČD. SŽDC is responsible for managing 9,478 kilometres (5,889 mi) of tracks in the Czech Republic, all which are main lines and almost all regional lines (except Nová Bystřice - Obrataň narrow gauge line and Šumperk - Kouty nad Desnou line).

In August 2010, SŽ was ordered to stop work on all infrastructure projects as one part of broader government austerity measures that were implemented in response to economic consequences of the Great Recession, However, during the following month, it was decided to revive work on all projects whose contractors agreed to grant a discount against the original tender price. In December 2010, the Minister of Transportation Vít Bárta proposed restructuring SŽ into a holding company alongside ČD for the purpose of making "subsidies more transparent". During 2010, the revenues obtained from the operation of the rail network reportedly totaled CZK 4.3 billion, which was not sufficient to cover personal expenses of CZK 4.6 billion let alone other costs. The key budget items allowing management and repairs of the rail network were therefore subsidies from the State Fund for Transport Infrastructure (CZK 8.2 billion) and from the state budget (CZK 1.8 billion); moreover, SŽ received CZK 15 billion for modernization of the rail network.

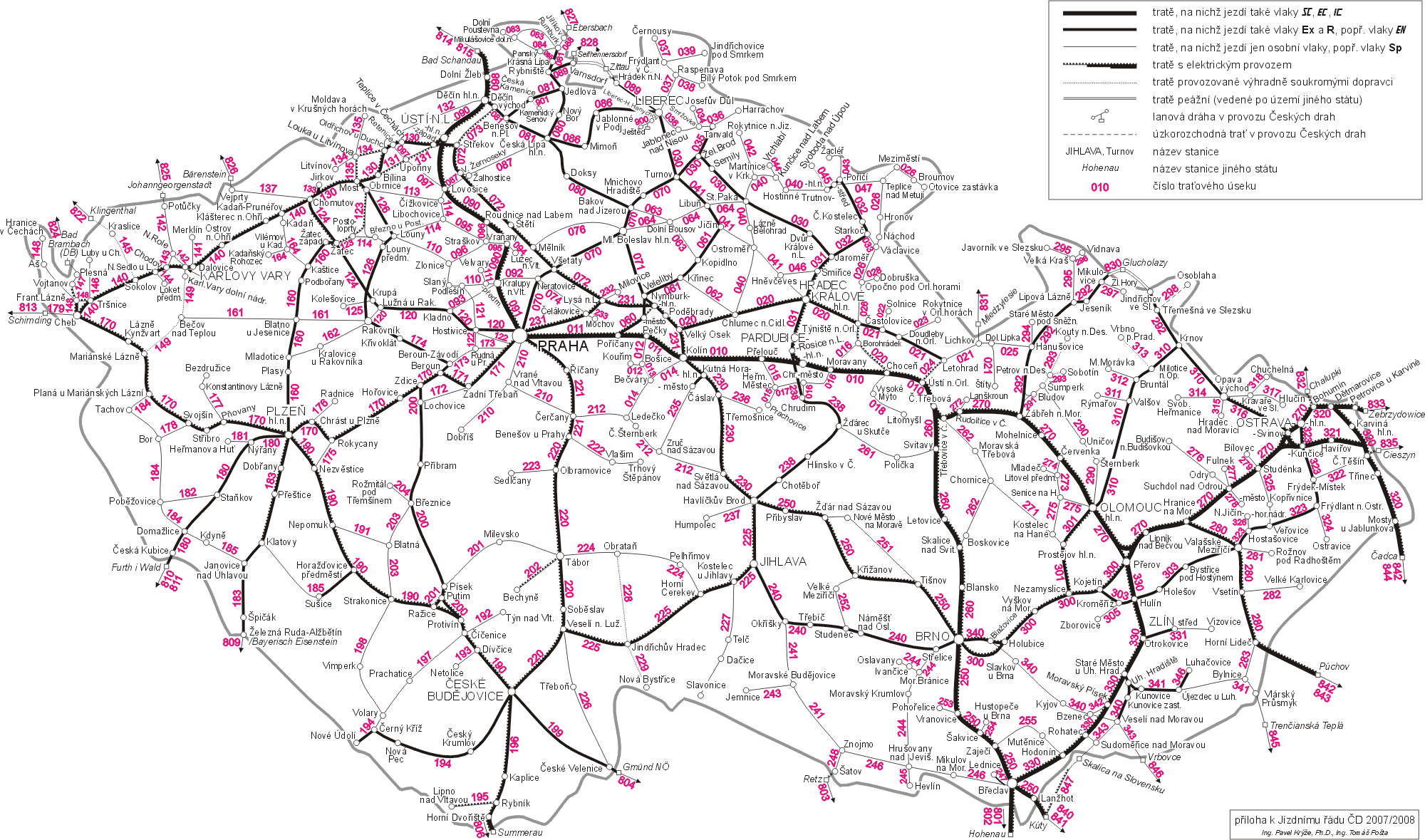
Railway network in the Czech Republic

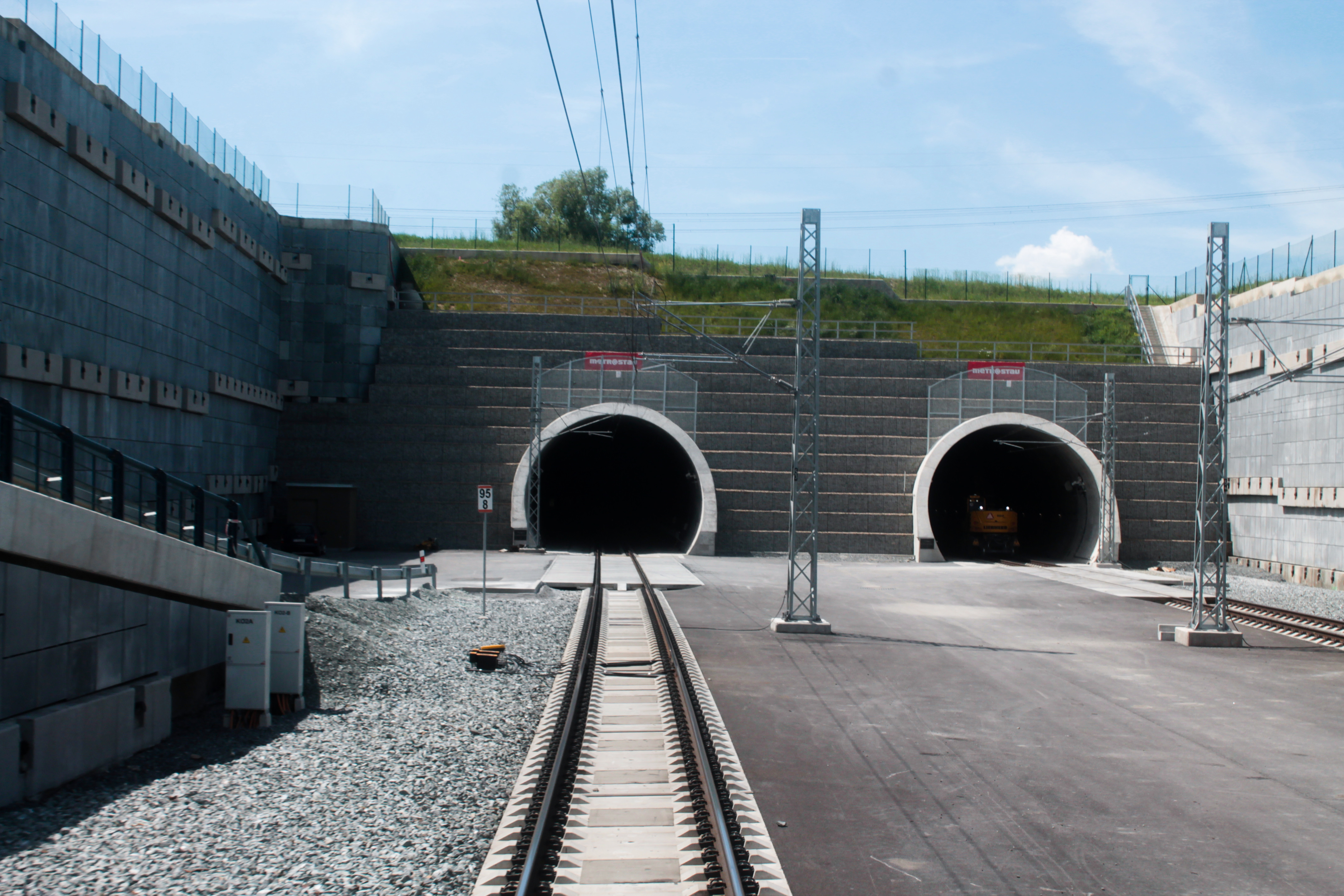
Ejpovice Tunnel, opened in 2018, the longest tunnel in the Správa železnic network (4.15 km)

In 2012, SŽ started its largest ever infrastructure project; the construction of a new railway line between Plzeň and Rokycany, expected to cost 7.53 billion CZK (with 85% funding from the EU). Initially due for completion in Spring 2015, this new railway has a length of 14.1 km (8.8 mi) long and features a 4.15 km (2.58 mi) twin-bore tunnel. Furthermore, various priority projects set out for the 2012-2015 timeframe included the reconstruction of the station at Břeclav, improvements in both speed and capacity of the route between Bubeneč and Holešovice stations in Prague, the modernisation of Olomouc main station, upgrades to the railway line between Sudoměřice u Tábora and Tábor to permit higher speeds, and the relocation of the line passing through Ústí nad Orlicí whilst preserving the historic station building. Substantial funding for these schemes was provided by the European Union (EU).

During the spring of 2019, the member of the Chamber of Deputies of the Czech Republic of the Parliament of the Czech Republic and the member of the Board of Directors of SŽ, Martin Kolovratník proposed that the name of the organization should be formally shortened to Správa železnic, which had by that point become the name most commonly used. On 20 September 2019, a new law authorising this the name change was passed, it came into effect on 1 January 2020. By this point, the Czech railway network comprised 9,400 kilometres of lines, 6,700 bridges, 2,500 railway stations and 166 tunnels.

Various projects were being undertaken by SŽ by the early 2020s; as a part of its continuing efforts to modernise and renovate the national railway infrastructure, and more specifically to reduce or elimination congestion along busy lines and key junctions, one major initiative has been the implementation of the European Rail Traffic Management System (ERTMS). The adoption of this new train control system is required by both national and EU legislation, the plan for which SŽ is responsible for administering. Seeking to bolster safety, surveillance cameras are also being deployed in quantity at busy level crossings across the country to deter dangerous crossings by members of the public. The organisation also intends to commission a new headquarters in Prague.

SŽ has also been making preparations for implementing high-speed railway line sections under a pilot scheme, the efforts of which is intended to work with the wider trans-European TEN-T scheme. To this end, a partnership has been formed with the French state railway organisation SNCF, through which SŽ intends to benefit from the high speed expertise of the former. Via a series of measures, including line relocations and doublings, it is planned to boost line speeds and permit high speed operations across various sections of the network. One key infrastructure change is the gradual conversion of all electrified lines from DC to AC to not only create compatibility with high-speed lines but to also lower energy losses and thus reduce costs; work on the first such conversion, between Nedakonice and Říkovice, was completed in July 2022. In early 2023, SŽ was actively presenting its plans to prospective investors for the construction of a high speed railway between the Czech city of Ostrava and the Polish city of Katowice, which shall form a new major trunk route between neighboring Poland and the Czech Republic.

In March 2020, officials from the German state-owned railway company Deutsche Bahn (DB) and SŽ announced the creation of a partnership that intend to develop a new cross-border rail link between the German city of Dresden and the Czech capital of Prague. Intended to carry both passenger and freight transport by rail, the major works involved in the project center on the creation of a new line between Heidenau in Saxony and Ústí nad Labem in the Czech Republic, which will include a cross-border tunnel under the Ore Mountains that is approximately 25km long. In comparison with legacy routes, the new line will facilitate a reduced journey time between Prague and Dresden from two hours and 15 minutes to a single hour, while passengers travelling between Berlin and Prague will also benefit from a shorter journey, decreasing from four hours and 30 minutes by car to two hours and 30 minutes by rail.
