= Benešov u Prahy railway station =

Railway station in Benešov, Czech Republic

Benešov u Prahy
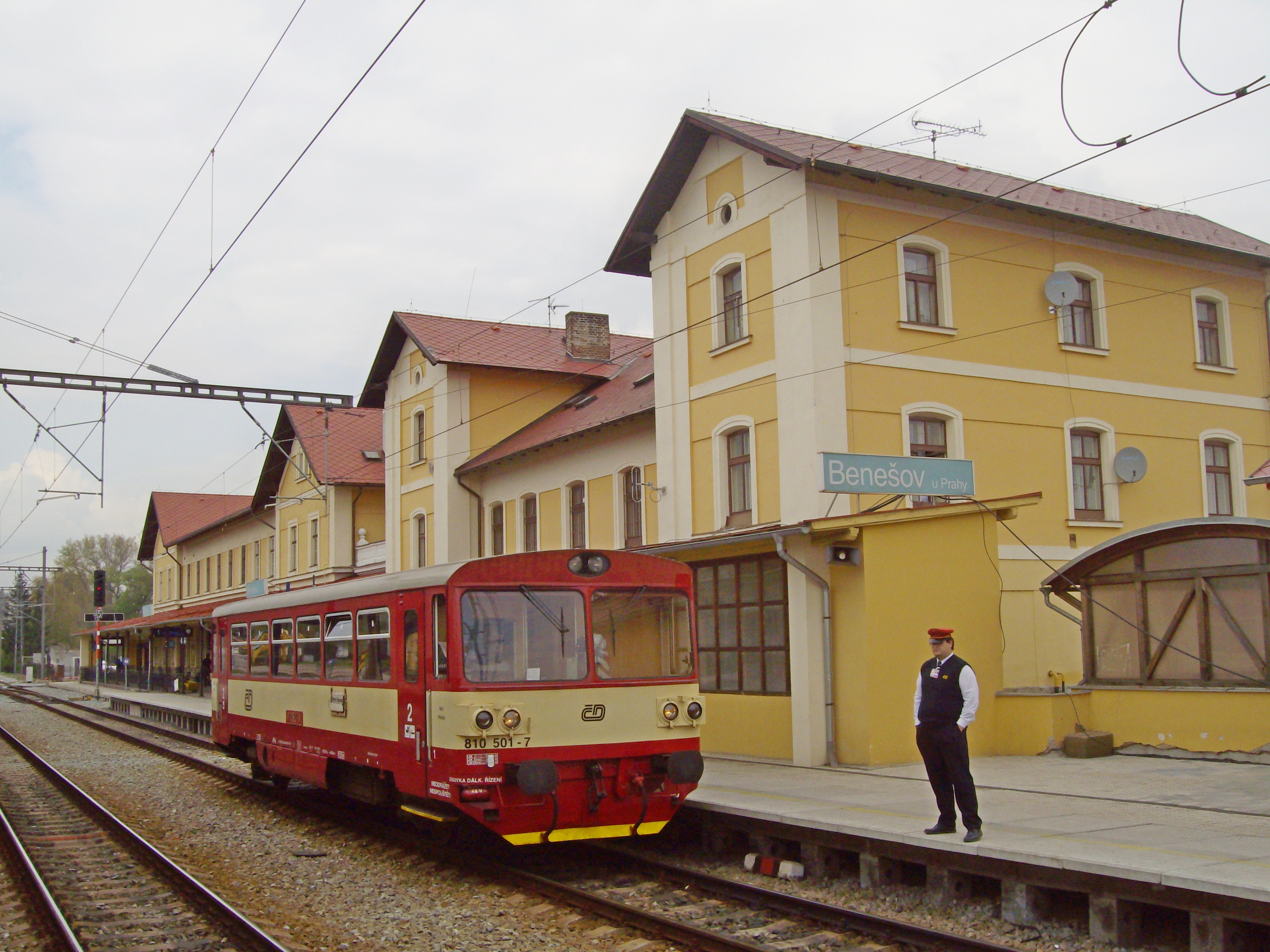

General information
- Location: Benešov; Czech Republic
- Coordinates: 49°46′47″N 14°40′58″E
- Lines: Benešov–České Budějovice railway; Prague– Benešov railway; Benešov–Trhový Štěpánov railway
- Platforms: 3
- Tracks: 5

Other information
- Station code: 54551069
- Fare zone: PID: 5

History
- Opened: 1871
Location

Benešov u Prahy (Czech: Železniční stanice Benešov u Prahy) is a railway station in Benešov in the Czech Republic. it is located on the Benešov–České Budějovice railway, Prague–Benešov railway and Benešov–Trhový Štěpánov railway. The train services are operated by České dráhy.

== History ==
The railway station was opened in 1871.

== Protection ==
The building of the railway station is protected as a cultural monument.

== Train services ==
The following services currently call at the station:

- Prague – Benešov – Tábor – Soběslav – Veselí nad Lužnicí – České Budějovice
- S9 Prague – Říčany – Strančice – Mirošovice – Čerčany – Benešov
- Osobní (local stopping service) Benešov – Postupice – Vlašim – Trhový Štěpánov

Preceding station	České dráhy	Following station
Olbramovice toward České Budějovice	Fast trains	Praha-Zahradní město toward Praha hl.n.
Myslíč toward Trhový Štěpánov	Stopping trains	Terminus
Bystřice u Benešova toward Tábor	Stopping trains	Terminus

Preceding station	Esko Prague	Following station
Terminus	S9	Mrač towards Strančice or Benešov u Prahy
