= Stolpersteine in Plzeň Region =

Memorial installations in Czech Republic

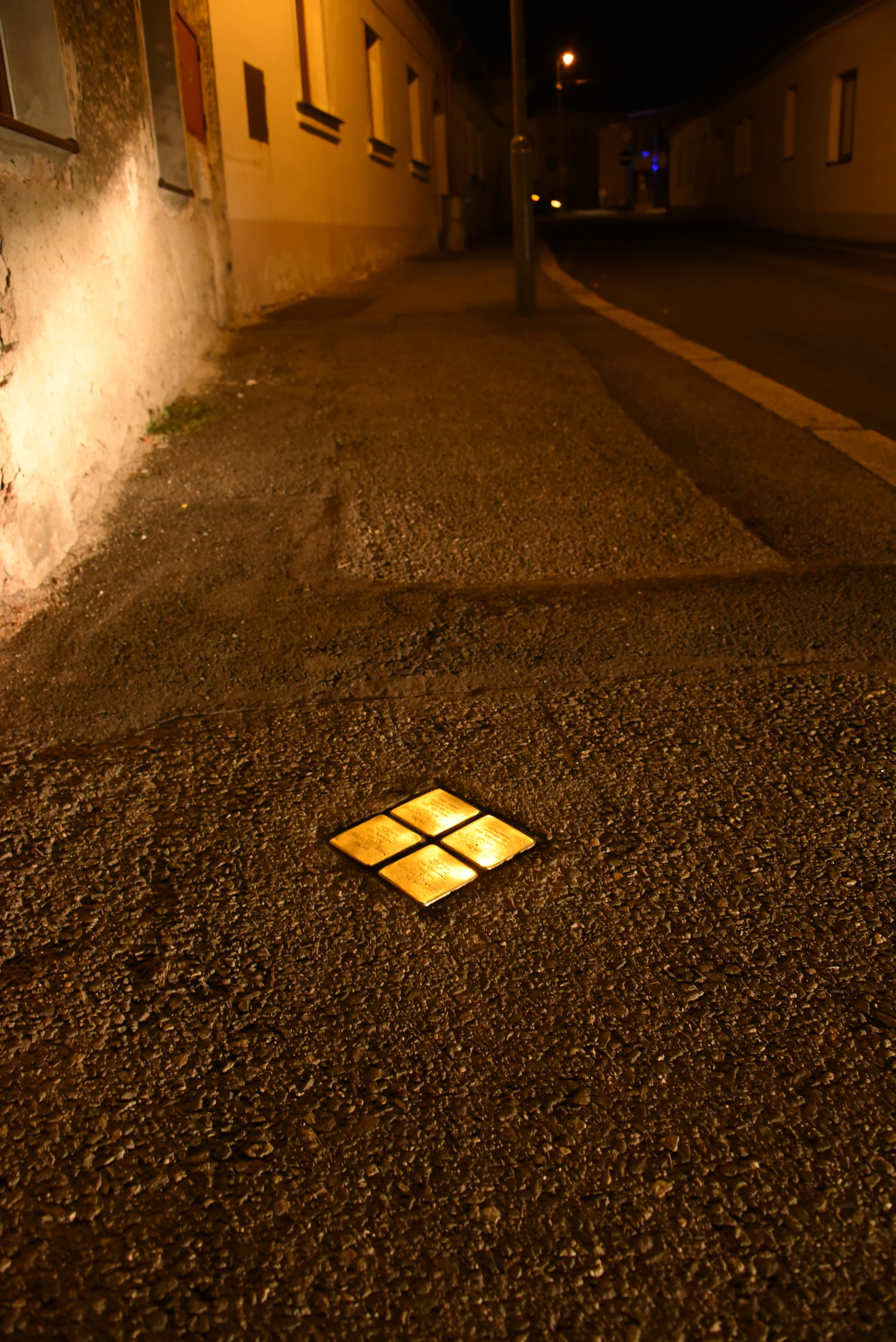
Stolpersteine for family Lederer in Horažďovice

This article lists the Stolpersteine in the Plzeň Region of the Czech Republic. Stolpersteine is the German name for stumbling blocks collocated all over Europe by German artist Gunter Demnig. They remember the fate of the Nazi victims being murdered, deported, exiled or driven to suicide.

Generally, the stumbling blocks are posed in front of the building where the victims had their last self-chosen residence.

== Horažďovice ==
First written reference indicates that ten Jewish families were living in the town in 1618. A Jewish cemetery existed since 1619. The original Horažďovice Synagogue, built in 1684, was destroyed by the Great Fire of 1868. A new synagogue was built on the same site. In 1901, the synagogue underwent a major renovation. Jakub Kohn, a prominent Horažd'ovice trader, bought the interior furnishings of the Synagogue of Polish Jews in Vienna and brought it to his hometown. Last Rabbi of Horažďovice was Martin Friedmann (1887–1931), from 1931 until 1941 there was only a lay leader, Adolf Popper, in this town.

During the Nazi rule in Czechoslovakia the synagogue was used as a storehouse. The ten Torah scrolls from the synagogue were rescued by London's Westminster Synagogue in 1964. The Memorial Scrolls Trust repaired them and loans them to synagogues throughout the world so that they can commemorate the perished Jewish communities of Bohemia. Westminster Synagogue also has produced a book about Horažďovice's Jewish community and its fate. Their members visited Horažďovice with Shlomo Fischl, the last living holocaust survivor of Horažďovice. He guided the group and gave first-hand testimony of the deportations to Theresienstadt on 26 November 1942, recorded on video by Westminster Synagogue. In 1980, the synagogue was destroyed by the Communists.

Today, not a single Jew is living in the town.

| Stone | Inscription | Location | Life and death |
|---|---|---|---|
| | HERE LIVED; JAKUB ADLER; BORN 1866; MURDERED 1942; IN MAUTHAUSEN | Plzeňská 265; 49°19′23″N 13°42′04″E | Jakub Adler was born on 26 May 1866 in Velký Bor. His parents were Simon Adler and Rosalia née Treichlinger. He had two sisters, Lotti (born 1867) and Marie (1868–1920). First he married Sofia née Schnürdreher. The couple had two children, Eleanor (born 1890) and Karl (born 1891). His wife died in 1903. Thereafter he married Růžena née Fröhlichová. The couple had at least three sons and two daughters, Josef (also Jozef, born 1904), Anna (born 1906, later named Pisinger), Ota (born 1908), Jindřiška (born 1910) and Jaroslav. He was a merchant, his wives were housewives. He was arrested and deported by the Nazis to Mauthausen concentration camp. He lost his life there in 1942. His second wife, four of their children, his son Karl and all three of his grandchildren were also murdered in the course of the Shoah at Łódź Ghetto, at Auschwitz and in Belarus. The fate of his daughter Eleanor and his son Jaroslav is not known, also that of his sister Lotti. |
| | HERE LIVED; OTA ADLER; BORN 1908; DEPORTED 1942; TO THERESIENSTADT; TO AUSCHWITZ 1943; MURDERED | Plzeňská 265; 49°19′23″N 13°42′04″E | Ota Adler, also Otto, was born on 6 March 1908. His parents were Jakub Adler and Růžena née Fröhlichová. He had two sisters, Anna (born 1906) and Jindřiška (born 1910), and two brothers, Josef (born 1904) and Jaroslav. His father was a merchant, his mother a housewife. He was a medical student and single. He, his mother and his sister Jindřiška were deported on 26 November 1942 from Klatovy to Theresienstadt concentration camp by transport Cd. His transport number was 170 of 651. In Theresienstadt, the family was separated. First, in January 1943, his sister Jindřiška was deported to Auschwitz concentration camp. She was murdered there. Then, on 6 September 1943, Ota Adler was deported to Auschwitz by transport Dl. His transport number was 1498 of 2,484. He was murdered there. At last, also their mother was also deported to Auschwitz on 15 December 1943. She was also murdered there. Also his brothers Karl and Josef, his sister Anna and her family members were murdered in the course of the Shoah. |
| | HERE LIVED; JINDŘIŠKA ADLEROVÁ; BORN 1910; DEPORTED 1942; TO THERESIENSTADT; TO AUSCHWITZ 1943; MURDERED | Plzeňská 265; 49°19′23″N 13°42′04″E | Jindřiška Adlerová was born on 9 June 1910. Her parents were Jakub Adler and Růžena née Fröhlichová. She had an older sister, Anna (born 1906), and three brothers, Josef (born 1904), Ota (born 1908) and Jaroslav. At a certain period she lived in Prague II, Vladislavova 16. She, her mother and her brother Ota were deported on 26 November 1942 from Klatovy to Theresienstadt concentration camp by transport Cd. Her transport number was 171 of 651. On 23 January 1943, she was deported to Auschwitz concentration camp by transport Cr. Her transport number was 1048 of 2,017. She was murdered there. Also her mother, her brothers Josef and Ota, her sister Anna and her brother-in-law František Pisinger as well as the two children of Anna and František were, separately, deported and murdered by the Nazis at Łódź Ghetto, at Auschwitz and in Belarus. |
| | HERE LIVED; RŮŽENA ADLEROVÁ; BORN 1910; DEPORTED 1942; TO THERESIENSTADT; TO AUSCHWITZ 1943; MURDERED | Plzeňská 265; 49°19′23″N 13°42′04″E | Růžena Adlerová née Fröhlichová was born on 16 June 1874. Her parents were Leopold Fröhlich and Barbora née Herrmann. She was married to Jakub Adler. The couple had at least three sons and two daughters, Josef (also Jozef, born 1904), Anna (born 1906, later named Pisinger), Ota (born 1908), Jindřiška (born 1910) and Jaroslav. Her husband was a merchant, she was a housewife. She and her children Ota and Jindřiška were deported on 26 November 1942 from Klatovy to Theresienstadt concentration camp by transport Cd. Her transport number was 169 of 651. In Theresienstadt, the family was separated. First, in January 1943, her daughter Jindřiška was deported to Auschwitz concentration camp. She was murdered there. Then, on 6 September 1943, her son Ota was deported to Auschwitz. He was murdered there too. At last, on 15 December 1943, also Růžena Adlerová was deported to Auschwitz by transport Dr. Her transport number was 44 of 2,519. She was murdered there. Her son Josef had already been deported to Łódź Ghetto on 26 October 1941 and lost his life there. Her daughter Anna was married to František Pisinger (born 1893), the couple had two children, Karel (born 1927) oder? Milos (born 1935). All four were murdered in September 1942 in Belarus. The fate of her son Jaroslav is unknown. |
| | HERE LIVED; KAREL GLAUBER; BORN 1937; DEPORTED 1942; TO THERESIENSTADT; 1943 TO AUSCHWITZ; MURDERED 18 December 1943 | Ševčíkova 22; 49°19′17″N 13°42′05″E | Karel Glauber, also Karl, was born on 14 June 1937 in Horažďovice. His parents were Valtr Glauber and Gertruda née Zinner (see below). On 26 November 1942, the boy was deported from Klatovy to Theresienstadt concentration camp by transport Cd. His transport number was 124 of 651. His mother was deported to Auschwitz concentration camp and murdered there on 16 January 1943. The little boy was deported on 18 December 1943 to Auschwitz by transport Ds. His transport number was 2219 of 2,503. There the Nazis took the life of the six years old boy. Also his father, all four of his grandparents and his aunt Marianna were murdered by the Nazis. |
| | HERE LIVED; VALTR GLAUBER; BORN 1899; DEPORTED 1942; TO THERESIENSTADT; 1943 TO AUSCHWITZ; MURDERED 18 December 1943 | Ševčíkova 22; 49°19′17″N 13°42′05″E | Valtr Glauber, also Walter, was born on 7 June 1899 in Horažďovice. His parents were David Glauber and Sophie née Langschur, also Zofie. He had four brothers: Emil (born 1895), Alfred (born 1897), Richard (born 1905) and Karl (born 1907). He was a merchant and married to Gertruda née Zinner (see below). The couple had a son, Karel, born in 1937 (see above). There is conflicting information about the place and the date of his death, ranging from 26 November 1942 in Ústí nad Labem to 18 July 1944 at Auschwitz concentration camp. His parents were both murdered 1942 at Treblinka extermination camp, his wife and his son separately 1943 in Auschwitz concentration camp. All his brothers could survive the Shoah. They all emigrated. Richard died 1950 in Israel, Karl 1975 in New York, Alfred 1983 in Flushing, Queens and Emil in 2000 also in Flushing. |
| | HERE LIVED; GERTRUDA GLAUBEROVÁ; BORN 1909; DEPORTED 1942; TO THERESIENSTADT; MURDERED 16 January 1943 | Ševčíkova 22; 49°19′17″N 13°42′05″E | Gertruda Glauberová née Zinner, also called Gertrude or Trude, was born on 24 August 1909 in Hlinsko. Her parents were Ludwig Zinner and Stefanie née Bergmann, also Steffi. She had a sister named Marianna, born on 20 March 1906, later married as Kraus. She married Valtr Glauber (see above). The couple had a son, Karel, born in 1937 (see above). She was arrested, separated from her child and deported to Auschwitz concentration camp. There she was murdered on 16 January 1943. Also her husband, her son, her mother and her sister were murdered by the Nazis in Auschwitz. Her father was murdered in Theresienstadt on 29 December 1943. |
| | HERE LIVED; MARTA GLÜCKAUFOVÁ; BORN 1889; DEPORTED 1942; TO THERESIENSTADT; 1943 TO AUSCHWITZ; MURDERED | Jiřího z Poděbrad 228; 49°19′22″N 13°42′01″E | Marta Glückaufová was born in 1889. Most probably she was the daughter of Albert Glückauf and Franziska née Lebenhart and had a sister named Olga. In 1942 she was deported to Theresienstadt concentration camp, in 1943 to Auschwitz concentration camp. There she was murdered by the Nazis. |
| | HERE LIVED; OSVALD KAFKA; BORN 1908; DEPORTED 1942; TO THERESIENSTADT; 1943 TO AUSCHWITZ; MURDERED | Havlíčkova 46; 49°19′13″N 13°42′07″E | Osvald Kafka was born on 9 November 1908. His parents were Max Beniamin Meir Kafka and Beila Berta Kafková. His father traded with eggs. He had a younger brother, Otakar (born 1919). He was a train worker. Together with mother and brother he was deported on 26 November 1942 from Klatovy to Theresienstadt concentration camp by transport Cd. His transport number was 128 of 651. On 13 December 1942, his mother died in Theresienstadt. On 6 September 1943, he was deported to Auschwitz concentration camp by transport Dl. His transport number was 905 of 2484. He was murdered in a gas chamber of Auschwitz. |
| | HERE LIVED; OTAKAR KAFKA; BORN 1919; DEPORTED 1942; TO THERESIENSTADT; 1943 TO AUSCHWITZ; MURDERED | Havlíčkova 46; 49°19′13″N 13°42′07″E | Otakar Kafka, also Otokar, was born on 10 August 1919. His parents were Max Beniamin Meir Kafka and Beila Berta Kafková. His father traded with eggs. He had an older brother, Osvald (born 1908). Together with mother and brother he was deported on 26 November 1942 from Klatovy to Theresienstadt concentration camp by transport Cd. His transport number was 129 of 651. On 13 December 1942, his mother died in Theresienstadt. Seven days later, on 20 December 1942, he was murdered by the Nazis in Theresienstadt. |
| | HERE LIVED; BERTA KAFKOVÁ; BORN 1884; DEPORTED 1942; TO THERESIENSTADT; 1943 TO AUSCHWITZ; MURDERED | Havlíčkova 46; 49°19′13″N 13°42′07″E | Beila Berta Kafková was either born on 22 May 1883 or on 22 May 1884. Her parents were Bernard Issakhar Kafka and Elenora Kafková. She was married to Max Beniamin Meir Kafka. The couple had two sons, Osvald (born 1908) and Otakar (born 1919), see above. She was a housewife. On 26 November 1942, she and her sons were deported from Klatovy to Theresienstadt concentration camp by transport Cd. Her transport number was 127 of 651. According to two serious sources she died in Theresienstadt, most probably on 13 December 1942. Therefore, the inscription on the Stolperstein, indicating that she was deported to Auschwitz in 1943 and was murdered there, might be wrong. The fate of her husband is unknown. Both sons were murdered by the Nazis. |
| | HERE LIVED; ARTUR KLEIN; BORN 1906; DEPORTED 1942; TO THERESIENSTADT; 1943 TO AUSCHWITZ; MURDERED 20 January 1943 | Havlíčkova 41; 49°19′14″N 13°42′06″E | Artur Klein |
| | HERE LIVED; RUDOLF KLEIN; BORN 1878; DEPORTED 1942; TO THERESIENSTADT; 1943 TO AUSCHWITZ; MURDERED 20 January 1943 | Havlíčkova 41; 49°19′14″N 13°42′06″E | Rudolf Klein |
| | HERE LIVED; WALTER KLEIN; Born 1909; DEPORTED 1942; TO THERESIENSTADT; 1943 TO AUSCHWITZ; MURDERED 20 January 1943 | Havlíčkova 41; 49°19′14″N 13°42′06″E | Walter Klein |
| | HERE LIVED; ŽOFIE KLEINOVÁ; Born 1879; DEPORTED 1942; TO THERESIENSTADT; 1943 TO AUSCHWITZ; MURDERED 20 January 1943 | Havlíčkova 41; 49°19′14″N 13°42′06″E | Žofie Kleinová |
| | HERE LIVED; VOJTĚCH LEDERER; BORN 1860; DEPORTED 1942; TO THERESIENSTADT; MURDERED | Jiřího z Poděbrad 228; 49°19′22″N 13°42′01″E | Vojtěch Avraham Lederer, also Adalbert, was born on 26 August 1860 in Lažany in the Strakonice District. His parents were Eva and Shimon Lederer. He was a merchant and married to Žofie, also called Reisl. On 26 November 1942, he, his wife and his sister-in-law Regina Ledererová were deported from Klatovy to Theresienstadt concentration camp by transport Cd. His transport number was 138 of 651. His wife died in Theresienstadt on 2 February 1943. His sister-in-law was deported to Auschwitz on 15 December 1943 and murdered there. Vojtěch Lederer lost his life in Theresienstadt on 18 December 1943. Another one of his relatives, Josefa Ledererová, born on 5 January 1882 in Slatina, living as a widow in Horažďovice, was deported together with him, his wife and his sister-in-law to Theresienstadt in 1942. She was deported to Auschwitz on 20 January 1943 and murdered there. |
| | HERE LIVED; REGINA LEDEREROVÁ; BORN 1869; DEPORTED 1942; TO THERESIENSTADT; MURDERED | Jiřího z Poděbrad 228; 49°19′22″N 13°42′01″E | Regina Ledererová, also Rerina or Rivka, was born on 13 November 1869 in Lednice. Her parents were Salamon and Sofie. Their last name, i.e. Rerina's maidens name, is not known. She was a housewife and married to Beniamin Lederer. She became a widow. On 26 November 1942, she was deported from Klatovy to Theresienstadt concentration camp by transport Cd, together with her brother-in-law Vojtěch Lederer and his wife. Her transport number was 557 of 651. Both relatives died in Theresienstadt in the course of 1943. On 15 December 1943, she was deported to Auschwitz concentration camp by transport Dr. Her transport number was 1272 of 2,519. There she was murdered by the Nazis. |
| | HERE LIVED; ŽOFIE LEDEREROVÁ; BORN 1861; DEPORTED 1942; TO THERESIENSTADT; MURDERED | Jiřího z Poděbrad 228; 49°19′22″N 13°42′01″E | Žofie Ledererová, also called Reisl, was born on 21 June 1861 in Beuthen, Germany. Her parents were Herman and Julie (last and maidens name not known). She was a housewife and married to Vojtěch Lederer. On 26 November 1942, she, her husband and her sister-in-law were deported from Klatovy to Theresienstadt concentration camp by transport Cd. Her transport number was 139 of 651. She lost her life in Theresienstadt on 2 February 1943. Her husband was brought to death on 18 December 1943, also in Theresienstadt. Her sister-in-law was deported to Auschwitz on 15 December 1943 and murdered there. |
| | HERE LIVED; DAVID LOHEIT; BORN 1876; DEPORTED 1942; TO THERESIENSTADT; 1943 TO AUSCHWITZ; MURDERED | Havlíčkova 51; 49°19′14″N 13°42′04″E | David Loheit was born on 25 January 1876. His parents were Sara and Tzvi Loheit. He married Josefine née Adler, born on 16 February 1882 in Horažďovice. His wife had ten siblings. David Loheit and his wife had three children: Egon (born 1907), Elsa (born 1909) and Olga (born 1910). He was first deported in 1942 to Theresienstadt concentration camp and 1943 to Auschwitz concentration camp, where he lost his life. His wife and his daughter Elsa were deported together on 26 November 1942 from Klatovy to Theresienstadt by transport Cd. The transport number of his wife was 107 of 651, of his daughter 108. Elsa Loheitová was deported already on 20 January 1943 to Auschwitz by transport Cq. Her transport number was 1300 of 2,000. Josefine Loheitová was sent to Auschwitz on 6 September 1943 by transport Dm. Her transport number was 3424. Both mother and daughter were murdered there by the Nazis. His son Egon was brought to death at Mauthausen concentration camp in 1943. At least two siblings of his wife were also murdered during the Shoah. His daughter Olga could survive. She died on 20 January 1996 in Los Angeles. |
| | HERE LIVED; ELISKA LOHEITOVÁ; BORN 1909; DEPORTED 1942; TO THERESIENSTADT; 1943 TO AUSCHWITZ; MURDERED | Havlíčkova 51; 49°19′14″N 13°42′04″E | Elsa Loheitová was born on 11 March 1909 in Písek. Her parents were David Loheit and Josefina née Adler. She had a brother, Egon (born 1907), and a sister, Olga (born 1910). She and her mother were deported together on 26 November 1942 from Klatovy to Theresienstadt concentration camp. Her transport number was 108 of 651. Also her father was deported to Thersienstadt in the course of the year 1942. Elsa Loheitová was deported already on 20 January 1943 to Auschwitz concentration camp by transport Cq. Her transport number was 1300 of 2,000. Both her mother and her father were also transported to Auschwitz in 1943. Herself and her parents were all murdered there by the Nazis. Her brother Egon was brought to death at Mauthausen concentration camp in 1943. At least one aunt and one uncle with his whole family were also murdered by the Nazis. Her sister Olga would survive Shoah. She died on 20 January 1996 in Los Angeles. |
| | HERE LIVED; JOSEFA LOHEITOVÁ; BORN 1882; DEPORTED 1942; TO THERESIENSTADT; 1943 TO AUSCHWITZ; MURDERED | Havlíčkova 51; 49°19′14″N 13°42′04″E | Josefina Loheitová née Adler was born on 16 February 1882 in Horažďovice. Her parents were Hermann Adler and Marie née Neumann. She had six sisters and four brothers, among them Jakub Adler (described above). She married David Loheit. The couple had three children: Egon (born 1907), Elsa (born 1909) and Olga (born 1910). Josefina Loheitová and her daughter Elsa were deported together on 26 November 1942 from Klatovy to Theresienstadt concentration camp by transport Cd. Her transport number was 107 of 651. Her daughter was deported already on 20 January 1943 to Auschwitz concentration camp by transport Cq. Also her husband was deported first to Theresienstadt, then to Auschwitz. Josefine Loheitová herself was also sent to Auschwitz, on 6 September 1943 by transport Dm. Her transport number was 3424. Husband, wife and daughter were all murdered there by the Nazis. Her son Egon was brought to death at Mauthausen concentration camp in 1943. At least two of her siblings, Jakub Adler (born 1870) and Johanna Stricker (born 1875), were also murdered during the Shoah. Her daughter Olga could survive. She died on 20 January 1996 in Los Angeles. |
| | HERE LIVED; ALFRED LÖWY; BORN 1896; DEPORTED 1942; TO THERESIENSTADT; 1943 TO AUSCHWITZ; MURDERED | Havlíčkova 51; 49°19′14″N 13°42′04″E | Alfred Löwy was born on 27 February 1896. His parents were Jakob Löwy (1865–1950) and Rosa or Rosalie née Adler (1871–?). He had seven siblings: Richard (born 1892), Marharetha (born 1893), Valerie (born 1894), Otto (born 1897), Leo (born 1898), Jaroslav (born 1900) and Hedwig (born 1903, later named Lauber). He also had two half siblings, one of them was Karl. Alfred Löwy married Růžena née Straková. The couple had two children: Leo (born 1928) and Zdeňka (born 1930). On 26 November 1942, he and his family were deported from Klatovy to Theresienstadt concentration camp by transport Cd. His transport number was 151 of 651. On 6 September 1943, he was deported to Auschwitz concentration camp by transport Dl. His transport number was 1280 of 2484. Husband, wife and both children became victims of the Shoah. |
| | HIER WOHNTE; FRANTIŠEK LÖWY; GEB. 1930; DEPORTIERT 1942; NACH THERESIENSTADT; 1944 NACH AUSCHWITZ; ERMORDET 4 October 1944 | Havlíčkova 51; 49°19′14″N 13°42′04″E | František Löwy |
| | HERE LIVED; JOSEF LÖWY; BORN 1864; DEPORTED 1942; TO THERESIENSTADT; MURDERED 1 March 1943 | Komenského 193; 49°19′25″N 13°41′48″E | Josef Löwy was born on 5 March 1864. His parent were Leopold Löwy und Anna née Adler. He had six siblings: Jakob (born 1865), Simon (born 1873), Karoline (born 1880, later named Drill), Louis, Moritz and Therese. He married Františka née Sonnenschein. The couple had four children: Ludwig (born 1897), Amalia (born 1908), Louise and Ottilie. Josef Löwyá and his wife were deported from Klatovy to Theresienstadt concentration camp by transport Cd. His transport number was 68 of 651. There, husband and wife were both murdered by the Nazis, Josef Löwy on 1 March 1943 and Františka Löwyová on 11 November 1944. At least two of their children were also murdered in the course of the Shoah: Ludwig was murdered on 3 January 1943 in Mauthausen concentration camp, Amalia on 16 Dezember 1943 in Auschwitz concentration camp. Ludwig's only daughter, Hana, was also murdered in Auschwitz. |
| | HERE LIVED; LEO LÖWY; BORN 1928; DEPORTED 1942; TO THERESIENSTADT; 1943 TO AUSCHWITZ; MURDERED | Havlíčkova 51; 49°19′14″N 13°42′04″E | Leo Löwy was born on 4 November 1928 in Horažďovice. His parents were Alfred Löwy and Růžena née Straková. He had a younger sister, Zdeňka (born 1930). On 26 November 1942, he and his family were deported from Klatovy to Theresienstadt concentration camp by transport Cd. His transport number was 153 of 651. On 6 September 1943, he was deported to Auschwitz concentration camp by transport Dl. His transport number was 1282 of 2484. He became a victim of the Shoah. The Nazis murdered also his parents and his sister. |
| | HERE LIVED; RICHARD LÖWY; BORN 1892; DEPORTED 1942; TO THERESIENSTADT; 1944 TO AUSCHWITZ; MURDERED 1 October 1944 | Havlíčkova 51; 49°19′14″N 13°42′04″E | Richard Löwy |
| | HERE LIVED; FRANTIŠKA LÖWYOVÁ; BORN 1865; DEPORTED 1942; TO THERESIENSTADT; MURDERED | Komenského 193; 49°19′25″N 13°41′48″E | Františka Löwyová née Sonnenschein, also Lowy, was born on 26 April 1865. Her parents were Lazar Somenscheiu und Barbara née Ehrlich. She married Josef Löwy. The couple had four children: Ludwig (born on 12 December 1897), who married Emily née Wolf (born 1908), one daughter, Hana (born on 9 May 1936); Amalia or Emilie (born on 28 December 1908); Louise (dates of birth and death unknown); Ottilie (dates of birth and death unknown); Františka Löwyová and her husband were deported from Klatovy to Theresienstadt concentration camp by transport Cd. Her transport number was 69 of 651. There her husband was murdered on 1 March 1943 and she lost her life on 11 November 1944. At least two of their children were also murdered by the Nazis: Ludwig was murdered on 3 January 1943 in Mauthausen concentration camp, Amalia on 16 Dezember 1943 in Auschwitz concentration camp. Ludwig's only daughter, Hana, was also murdered in Auschwitz. |
| | HERE LIVED; MARKETA LÖWYOVÁ; BORN 1903; DEPORTED 1942; TO THERESIENSTADT; 1944 TO AUSCHWITZ; MURDERED 4 October 1944 | Havlíčkova 51; 49°19′14″N 13°42′04″E | Marketa Löwyová |
| | HERE LIVED; RŮŽENA LÖWYOVÁ; BORN 1898; DEPORTED 1942; TO THERESIENSTADT; 1943 TO AUSCHWITZ; MURDERED | Havlíčkova 51; 49°19′14″N 13°42′04″E | Růžena Löwyová née Straková was born on 12 August 1898. Her parents were Josef Strak und Rozine née Kantorová. She married Alfred Löwy. The couple had two children: Leo (born 1928) and Zdeňka (born 1930). On 26 November 1942, she was deported from Klatovy to Theresienstadt concentration camp by transport Cd. Her transport number was 152 of 651. On 6 September 1943, she was deported to Auschwitz concentration camp by transport Dl. Her transport number was 1281 of 2484. She, her husband and both children became victims of the Shoah. |
| | HERE LIVED; ZDEŇKA LÖWYOVÁ; BORN 1930; DEPORTED 1942; TO THERESIENSTADT; 1943 TO AUSCHWITZ; MURDERED | Havlíčkova 51; 49°19′14″N 13°42′04″E | Zdeňka Löwyová was born in 1930 in Horažďovice. Her parents were Alfred Löwy and Růžena née Straková. She had an older brother, Leo (born 1928). On 26 November 1942, she and her family were deported from Klatovy to Theresienstadt concentration camp by transport Cd. Her transport number was 154 of 651. On 6 September 1943, she was deported to Auschwitz concentration camp by transport Dl. Her transport number was 1222 of 2484. She became a victim of the Shoah. The Nazis murdered also her parents and her brother. |
| | HERE LIVED; ZIKMUND MAUTNER; BORN 1901; DEPORTED 1942; TO THERESIENSTADT; TO AUSCHWITZ 1943; MURDERED | Plzeňská 265; 49°19′23″N 13°42′04″E | Zikmund Mautner was born on 9 December 1901. On 26 November 1942, he was deported from Klatovy to Theresienstadt concentration camp by transport Cd. His transport number was 137 of 651. On 20 January 1943 he was deported to Auschwitz concentration camp by transport Cq. His transport number was 1316 of 2,000. He was murdered by the Nazis during Shoah. |
| | HERE LIVED; FRANTIŠEK MÜNZ; BORN 1885; DEPORTED 1942; TO MAUTHAUSEN; MURDERED 11 June 1942 | Mírové nám. 45; 49°19′14″N 113°42′03″E | František Münz |
| | HERE LIVED; HUGO MÜNZ; BORN 1912; DEPORTED 1942; TO THERESIENSTADT; 1943 TO AUSCHWITZ; MURDERED | Mírové nám. 45; 49°19′14″N 113°42′03″E | Hugo Münz |
| | HERE LIVED; MALVINA MÜNZOVÁ; BORN 1892; DEPORTED 1942; TO THERESIENSTADT; 1943 TO AUSCHWITZ; MURDERED | Mírové nám. 45; 49°19′14″N 113°42′03″E | Malvina Münzová |
| | HERE LIVED; JOSEFINA PISINGEROVÁ; BORN 1899; DEPORTED 1942; TO THERESIENSTADT; 1943 TO AUSCHWITZ; MURDERED 23 January 1943 | Plzeňská 265; 49°19′23″N 13°42′04″E | Josefina Pisingerová |
| | HERE LIVED; ARNOLD SCHWARTZ; BORN 1903; DEPORTED 1942; TO THERESIENSTADT; 1943 TO AUSCHWITZ; MURDERED 26 January 1943 | Havlíčkova 51; 49°19′14″N 13°42′04″E | Arnold Schwarz |
| | HERE LIVED; RŮŽENA WEISOVÁ; BORN 1881; DEPORTED 1942; TO THERESIENSTADT; 1943 TO AUSCHWITZ; MURDERED 15 December 1942 | Havlíčkova 41; 49°19′14″N 13°42′06″E | Růžena Weisová |

== Plzeň ==
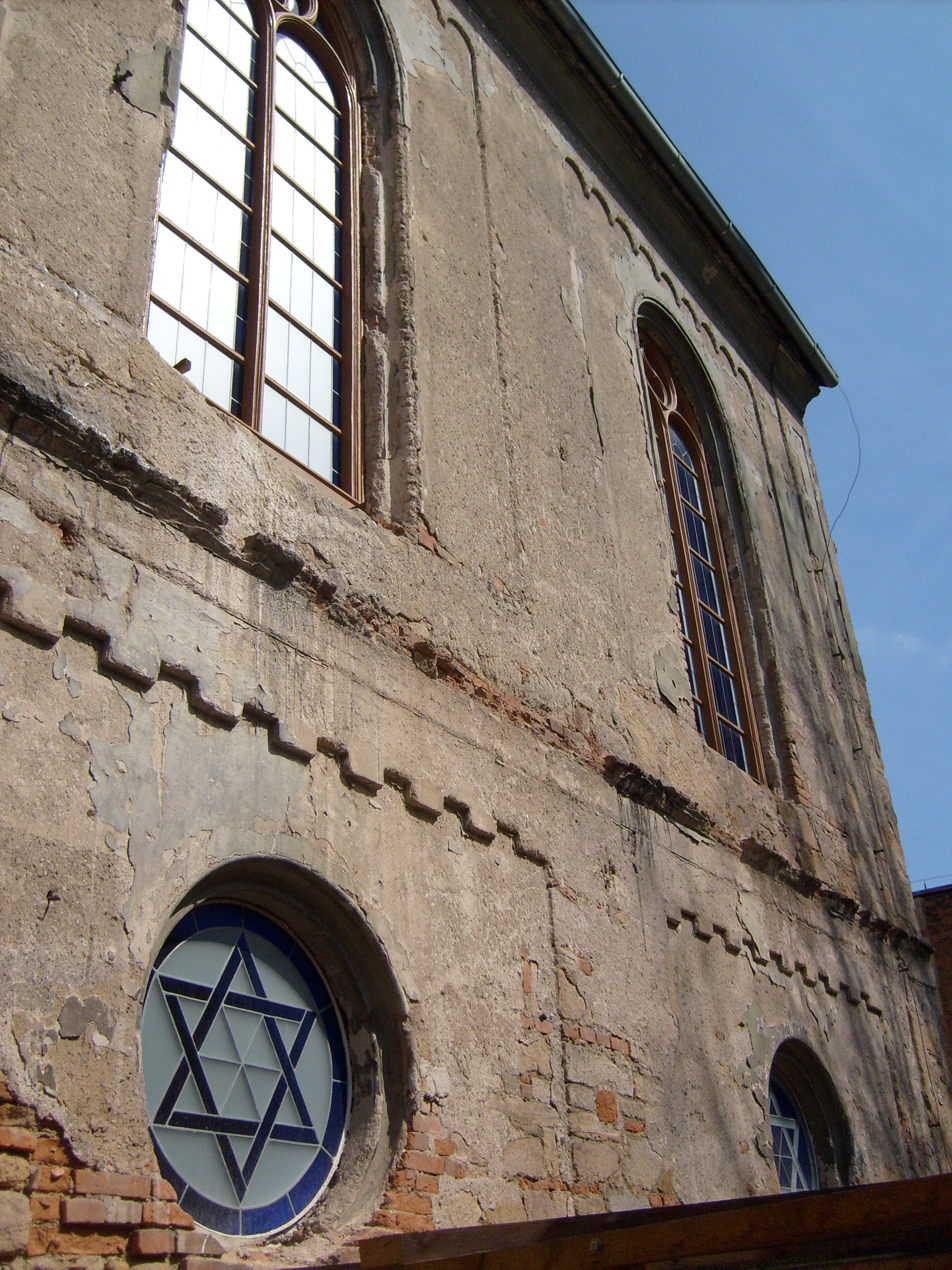
The Old Synagogue of Plzeň

The Jewish community of Plzeň was established in the 14th century, as one of the first in Bohemia. The first record of the community is a decree of Charles IV from 1338, that ordered the administrators of the town to protect the Jews. The community built a synagogue, and, in 1432, bought land for a cemetery. For a long period, there were peaceful cooperation and trade between Jews and Christians — until 1504, when charges of desecration of hosts led to the expulsion of all Jews from Plzeň. Nevertheless, some Jews managed to settle in the town in the early 19th century illegally. In 1821 a total of 32 resided in Plzeň without permit. This changed drastically in 1848, when the Austrian monarch lifted residence restrictions for Jews in the whole empire. Now, Jews came back to attend the Plzeň markets and to officially take residence in the town. By 1854, the Jewish population of the town had jumped to 249. In 1856, a Jewish cemetery was consecrated. In 1859, a synagogue was inaugurated. In spite of anti-Jewish riots of 1866, the Jewish population continued to grow — and reached the number 1,207 in 1870. At the beginning of the 20th century the Jewish community of Plzeň was among the largest and most affluent in Bohemia. It could afford to construct a large synagogue in the Moorish style, built in 1893, called the Great Synagogue. The first lodge of Bnai Brith in Bohemia was founded in town.

Since 1918, the community employed two rabbis, one for Czech services, the other one for German language services. The community was quite diverse then, ideologically the Jews of Plzeň were split into three groups, the Czech nationalist Jews, the German assimilationists and the Zionists. In 1920, a severe and years-long controversy on kosher slaughtering broke out, when it was declared illegal for humanitarian reasons. Although the Supreme Court abolished this kind of prohibition in 1934, attempts to reintroduce Shechita failed, due to the price difference. In 1921, the Jews of Plzeň numbered 3,117. But thereafter the Jews population declined to 2,773 in 1930 (2.4% of the total population). After the annexation of Sudetenland by Hitler's Reich in the fall of 1938, many Jews from these regions arrived in the city. They felt in safety, but this changed drastically when Hitler Germany invaded the rest of Bohemia and Moravia in March 1939. The so-called Nuremberg Laws were also put in effect in the so-called Protectorate, Jews in Plzeň were gradually deprived of their civil rights and liberties, their social status, their property and employment. They were treated like inferiors and exposed to degrading repressions on administrative, psychological and physical levels.

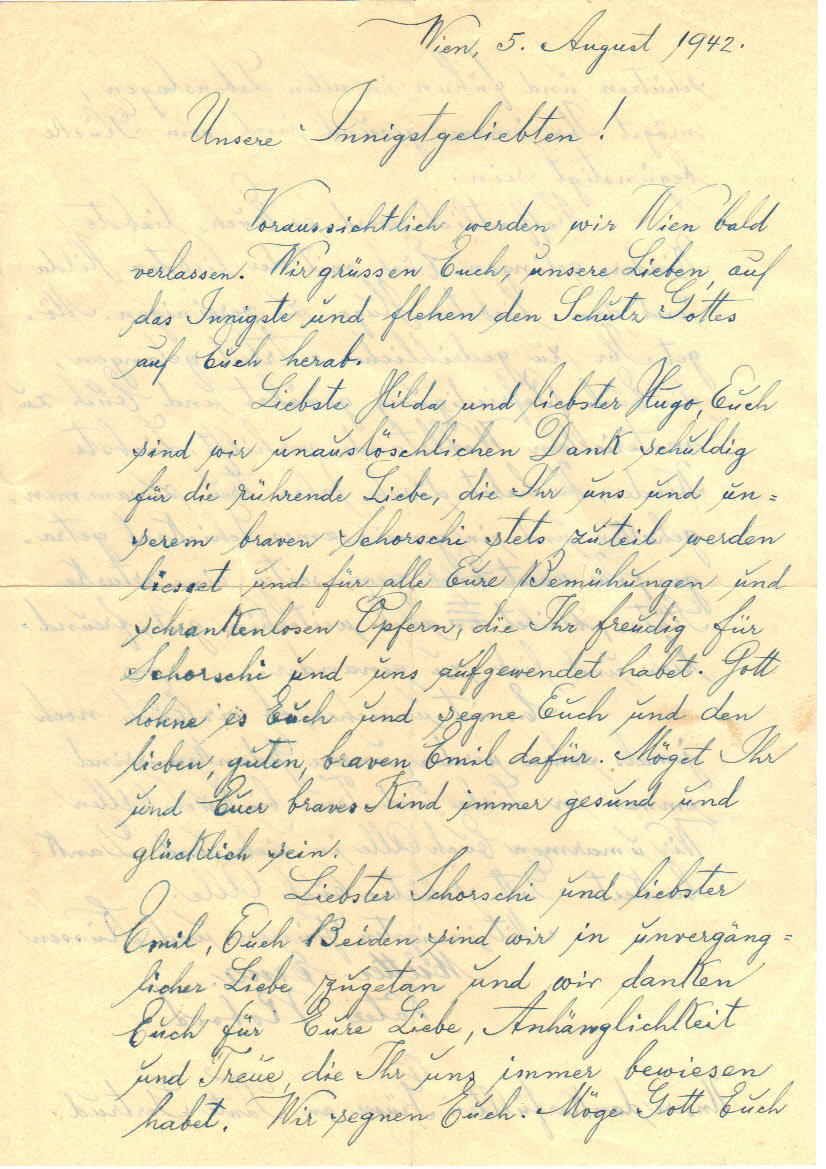
One of the last letters of Robert Auer (born in Plzeň) and his wife Ernestine, both murdered by the Nazis

In January 1942, at least 2,000 of Plzeò citizens of all professions, all social classes and all ages (workers, craftsmen, tradesmen, bankers, lawyers, teachers, physicians, officials, housewives, children and elderly persons) were interned in the Sokol building in Štruncovy Sady and deported from town after several days. They were labelled "Jews" by the Nazis on the basis of their genealogical origin — not considering their faith nor their national or denominational feeling. They were forced to wear the yellow badge on the left side of the coats. Also interned and then deported were 540 Jews from nearby areas – men, women and children from Blovice, Hořovice, Kralovice, Manětín, Radnice, Rokycany and Zbiroh. The three deportation trains left Plzeò railway station within ten days, their destination was Theresienstadt concentration camp:

- 17 January: transport T with 1,000 deportees (murdered: 927, survived: 73).
- 22 January: transport S with 1,004 deportees (murdered: 937, survived: 67).
- 26 January: transport T with 609 deportees (murdered: 543, survived: 66).

The Pilsen deportation trains with 2,613 persons were among the first to arrive in Theresienstadt. The youngest was Eva Fischerová, eight months old, the oldest was Marie Ebenová from Rokycany, nearly 90. Most of the deportees had to walk from the Bohušovice railway station about two and a half kilometers to the camp, carrying children and luggage in the severe cold. There, families were separated, the living conditions in the barracks were gruesome, the food scarce. By the end of 22 January people of old age perished, among them Marie Ebenová.

Already in March of the same year two transports, Aa and Ab, each containing 1,000 people, were sent from Thersienstadt to the Izbica Ghetto. 620 of them were men, women and children from the Pilsen region. Additional 700 persons from the region were deported to ghettos, concentration camps and extermination camps in eastern Poland, Belorussia, Estonia and Latvia. On 26 October 1942 the first transport to Auschwitz left the camp. By the end of the year, not even one-third of the deportees was alive. More than 1,800 men, women and children had been murdered within the first eleven months after deportation. Only 206 of the Pilsen deportees would survive the Shoah.

Today, a little more than 70 Jews live in Plzeň.

| Stone | Inscription | Location | Life and death |
|---|---|---|---|
| | HERE LIVED; LEO BRUMMEL; BORN 1890; DEPORTED 1943; TO THERESIENSTADT; MURDERED 1944; IN AUSCHWITZ | Klatovská tř. 26/140; 49°43′50″N 13°22′11″E | Leo Brummel was born on 10 March 1890 in Klatovy, where he and his family lived until 1905. His parents were Jenny (also Zheni) and Moritz Brummel (1852–1927). He had two brothers, Hans (also Jan) and Kurt (who died in 1933), and a sister, Gretl (also Markéta, born on 4 July 1887, later married to Leo Eisenschimmel). His father was a tanner and he became one too. He participated in WWI and was captured in Russia. After coming back to Pilsen, he worked as one of the owners of the Brummel, Bloch & Waldstein tannery. He and his brother Hans married two Liebstein sisters, Gertruda and Johanna (also Jana). Leo Brummel and his wife had two daughters, Eva (born 1923) and Eliska (born 1926). After the company was closed during the depression he worked in Sušice. His daughter Eva could emigrate to Great Britain in July 1939 with a Winton Train. The last residence of the family before deportation was in Pilsen. For unknown reasons the Brummel family was not summoned to any of the Pilsen transports. Instead, Leo Brummel, his wife and their younger daughter were all deported from Prague on 5 July 1943 with transport De to Theresienstadt concentration camp. His transport number was 9 of 604. After three months there they were all deported on 6 September 1943 to Auschwitz concentration camp. His transport number was 220 of 2484. The whole family was murdered by the Nazis during the mass liquidation of the so-called Terezín Family Camp on 8 March 1944. His sister was murdered in Auschwitz too. His brother Hans and his sister-in-law Johanna were also deported to Auschwitz, but could survive. His daughter Eva stayed in England, married, had two children and four grandchildren. A gravestone for the Brummel family has been placed at the Pilsen cemetery. |
| | HERE LIVED; ELIŠKA BRUMMELOVÁ; BORN 1926; DEPORTED 1943; TO THERESIENSTADT; MURDERED 1944; IN AUSCHWITZ | Klatovská tř. 26/140; 49°43′50″N 13°22′11″E | Eliška Brummelová, also Lilky, Lilka, Lilly or Lili, was born on 14 March 1926. Her parents were Leo Brummel and Gertruda née Liebsteinová. She had a sister, Eva (born 1923). The girls had a nanny called Beta who lived with them. After the destruction of Czechoslovakia and the takeover of power by the Nazis, the parents of Eva and Eliška had been ″weighing up the opportunity of their children's emigration for a long time. Finally they let the decision up to them. Eva didn't hesitate to leave, Lilly did not want to go away and in fact her mother was glad that at least one of her daughters would stay.″ Her sister emigrated to Great Britain in July 1939 with a Winton Train. Eliška and her aunt Jana were sent to work as loggers in Křivoklátsko. The last residence of the family before deportation was in Pilsen. Eliška Brummelová and her parents were all deported on 5 July 1943 with transport De from Prague th Theresienstadt concentration camp. Her transport number was 10 of 604. After three months there they were all deported on 6 September 1943 to Auschwitz concentration camp. Her transport number was 218 of 2484. The whole family was murdered by the Nazis during the mass liquidation of the so-called Terezín Family Camp on 8 March 1944. |
| | HERE LIVED; GERTRUDA; BRUMMELOVÁ; BORN 1899; DEPORTED 1943; TO THERESIENSTADT; MURDERED 1944; IN AUSCHWITZ | Klatovská tř. 26/140; 49°43′50″N 13°22′11″E | Gertruda Brummelova née Liebsteinová was born on 22 September 1899. Her parents were Wilhelm Liebstein and Hedwig Hedda née Beständig. She had two sisters, Marianne and Johanna. She was married to Leo Brummel, a tanner, and her sister Johanna was married to Hans Brummel, Leo's brother. The couple had two daughters, Eva (born 1923) and Eliska (born 1926). The last residence of the family before deportation was in Pilsen. Eva could emigrate in July 1939 to Great Britain with a Winton Train. Gertruda Brummelová, her husband and their younger daughter were all deported on 5 July 1943 with transport De from Prague th? Theresienstadt concentration camp. Her transport number was 11 of 604. After three months there they were all deported on 6 September 1943 to Auschwitz concentration camp. Her transport number was 219 of 2484. The whole family was murdered by the Nazis during the mass liquidation of the so-called Terezín Family Camp on 8 March 1944. Also her mother was murdered in the course of the Shoah. Her daughter Eva stayed in England, married, had two children and four grandchildren. |
| | HERE LIVED; EMIL EHRLICH; BORN 1923; DEPORTED 1942; TO THERESIENSTADT; MURDERED 1944; IN AUSCHWITZ | Bendova 1172/5; 49°44′27″N 13°22′14″E | Emil Ehrlich was born on 24 December 1923. His parents were Hermína and Josef Ehrlich, they ran two linen shops. As a boy, Emil suffered from several chronic diseases. A Czech remembrance project describes him in this way: ″He was quiet and unostentatious and had neither many friends nor enemies. His classmates quite liked him and saw him as a shy, physically weak, but still persistent boy.″ One day at the beginning of the school year 1939/1940, the school was visited by Gestapo. Eyewitnesses gave detailed reports how Emil was excluded from school on that day: ″Some men standing in the door made Emil pack his things and leave the school forever″. Thereafter he worked as a labourer. The last residence of the family before deportation was in Pilsen. On 26 January 1942, Emil Ehrlich and his parents were deported with transport T to Theresienstadt concentration camp. His transport number was 115 of 609. After more than two years in Theresienstadt, the three family members were deported with transport Eb to Auschwitz-Birkenau concentration camp on 18 May 1944. His transport number was 2173 of 2,500. In Auschwitz-Birkenau they were interned at the so-called Terezín Family Camp. All three were murdered by the Nazis. |
| | HERE LIVED; JOSEF EHRLICH; BORN 1893; DEPORTED 1944; TO THERESIENSTADT; MURDERED 1944; IN AUSCHWITZ | Bendova 1172/5; 49°44′27″N 13°22′14″E | Josef Ehrlich was born on 29 August 1893. He was married to Hermína (see below). The couple had one son, Emil (see above). They ran two linen shops, one on Sedláčkova, the other one on Klatovská, not far from their home in Bendova street. After the invasion of the Nazi troops, both shops were confiscated and their son was banned from school. The last residence of the family before deportation was in Pilsen. On 26 January 1942, Josef Ehrlich, his wife and their son were deported with transport T to Theresienstadt concentration camp. His transport number was 117 of 609. After more than two years in Theresienstadt, the three family members were deported with transport Eb to Auschwitz concentration camp on 18 May 1944. His transport number was 833 of 2,500. All three were murdered by the Nazis. On transport T was also Amálie Ehrlichová (born 28 June 1894, transport number 114) who was deported to Izbica Ghetto in March 1942 and was murdered there. It has not been clarified if and how she was related to Josef Ehrlich. |
| | HERE LIVED; HERMÍNA EHRLICHOVÁ; BORN 1896; DEPORTED 1942; TO THERESIENSTADT; MURDERED 1944; IN AUSCHWITZ | Bend ova 1172/5; 49°44′27″N 13°22′14″E | Hermína Ehrlichová was born on 28 March 1896. She was married to Josef (see above). The couple had one son, Emil (see above). They ran two linen shops, one on Sedláčkova, the other one on Klatovská, not far from their home in Bendova street. After the invasion of the Nazi troops, both shops were confiscated and their son was banned from school. The last residence of the family before deportation was in Pilsen. On 26 January 1942, Hermína Ehrlichová, her husband and their son were deported with transport T to Theresienstadt concentration camp. Her transport number was 116 of 609. After more than two years in Theresienstadt, the three family members were deported with transport Eb to Auschwitz concentration camp on 18 May 1944. Her transport number was 834 of 2,500. All three were murdered by the Nazis. |
| | HERE LIVED; ADOLF FANTA; BORN 1889; DEPORTED 1942; TO THERESIENSTADT; MURDERED 1942; IN IZBICA | sady Pětatřicátníků 316/6; 49°44′46″N 13°22′26″E | Adolf Fanta was born on 24 November 1889. He grew up in Horní Roveň and later-on worked as a shop assistant in Jablonec nad Nisou and Pardubice. He came to Southern Bohemia where he met his future wife, Regina Glaserová from Èivice u Plané. They settled in Plzeň and got married in 1923, the rabbi was Ludwig Golinski (1879–1942). Nine months later their daughter Hana was born. After the destruction of Czechoslovakia by the Nazis and the occupation of Plzeň, the family underwent e series of restrictions und his daughter was expelled from school. Adolf Fanta experienced a severe Gestapo interrogation in January 1942. Three days before the deportation of the family, he came home battered. This was witnessed by Jarmila Lodlová from Tymákov, a school friend of his daughter who was just visiting Hana. On 22 January 1942, Adolf Fanta and his family were arrested and deported from Plzeň to Theresienstadt concentration camp by transport S. His transport number was 35 of 1,004. They remained interred there for nearly two months. On 17 March 1942, all three were deported to Izbica Ghetto by transport Ab. His transport number was 998 of 1,000. Adolf Fanta, his wife and his daughter were murdered by the Nazis. If they didn't die in the Ghetto due to lack of food, they were murdered in one of the nearby extermination camps such as Bełżec or Sobibór. |
| | HERE LIVED; HANA FANTOVÁ; BORN 1923; DEPORTED 1942; TO THERESIENSTADT; MURDERED 1942; IN IZBICA | sady Pětatřicátníků 316/6; 49°44′46″N 13°22′26″E | Hana Fantová was born on 18 November 1923. Her parents were Adolf Fanta and Regina née Glaserová. During her early years she had a nanny, Marie Balická, a Catholic widow. Her father was a salesman, her mother was running a sewing shop. According to her classmates she was one of the best students. Hana was a modest girl, but also cheerful and sociable. On Saturdays, instead of school, she was allowed to attend the synagogue. She had to leave the school in the mid-term of the fifth grade because Jews were not allowed any longer to visit public schools. Her best friend was Jarmila Lodlová from Tymákov who remained faithful in the following years. She remembers: "She had typically Jewish hair – black and curly. She was banned from going out, only in winter she used to go ice skating. She was cheerful and sociable. She was a good girl. She had to wear the star.″ Despite several prohibitions, Hana attended a dancing course. The family lost their shop and were expelled from their apartment. Thereafter they had to share a much smaller apartment with at least two other families. Her father experienced a severe Gestapo interrogation in January 1942 and came home battered. Three days later, on 22 January 1942, Hana Fantová and her parents were deported from Plzeň to Theresienstadt concentration camp by transport S. Her transport number was 37 of 1,004. They remained interred there for nearly two months. On 17 March 1942, all three were deported to Izbica Ghetto by transport Ab. Her transport number was 1000 of 1,000. Hana Fantová and her parents were murdered by the Nazis. |
| | HERE LIVED; REGINA FANTOVÁ; BORN 1923; DEPORTED 1942; TO THERESIENSTADT; MURDERED 1942; IN IZBICA | sady Pětatřicátníků 316/6; 49°44′46″N 13°22′26″E | Regina Fantová née Glaserová was born on 14. January 1887. She was married to Adolf Fanta in 1923. She was running a sewing shop, her husband was a salesman. The couple had a daughter named Hana (born in 1923in ). After the Nazi occupation of Plzeň, the family suffered from a series of restrictions and discriminations imposed on all Jews. Her husband was arrested, interrogated and beaten by the Gestapo. Regina Fantová, her husband and their daughter were arrested and, on 22 January 1942, deported from Plzeň to Theresienstadt concentration camp by transport S. Her transport number was 35 of 1,004. They remained interred there for nearly two months. On 17 March 1942, all three were deported to Izbica Ghetto by transport Ab. Her transport number was 999 of 1,000. During the Holocaust the town of Izbica in Eastern Poland was a desperately overcrowded gathering point for Jews from Poland and from abroad. It served as a transit camp where Jewish families had to wait for their transport to extermination camps such as Bełżec, Sobibór or Chelmno, not knowing that they were to be murdered. Regina Fantová, her husband and their daughter were murdered by the Nazis either in Izbica or in one of the extermination camps. |
| | HERE LIVED; EMIL LÖBNER; BORN 1897; DEPORTED 1942; TO THERESIENSTADT; MURDERED 1944; IN AUSCHWITZ | Schwarzova 1847/50; 49°43′53″N 13°21′53″E | Emil Löbner was born on 26 March or April 1897 in Stříbro. His parents were Sigmund Löbner and Regina née Rauscher. He had four sisters and one brother: Gisela (1890–1918), Levana (also Klara, born 1891, later Steiner), Erna (born 1893, later Fantes), Mathilda (born 1894, later Kohn) and Walter (born 1903). He was married to Josefina Löbnerová née Köserová (born on 23 November 1897). The couple had two sons: Egon (born on 24 February 1924) and Vilém Benjamin (born on 13 March 1926). He became a successful businessman and headed the trade company R. E. Erben. In the late 1920s he could afford to construct a spacious villa in Schwarzova 50. His wife was a housewife, the sons had Czech and German-speaking nannies and grew up fluent in both languages. Before the Nazis destroyed Czechoslovakia, Löbner delivered his goods to more than two hundred gas stations in western Bohemia. He was a member and sponsor of the local Jewish community and Zionist organizations. In 1939, their son Vilém emigrated to Palestine. The Nazis confiscated the villa and his company. The family had to move to an apartment in Kollárovy 18. On 18 January 1942 he, his wife and their son Egon were arrested and deported from Pilsen to Theresienstadt concentration camp by transport R. His transport number was 406 of 1,000. On 7 July 1942 also his parents arrived at Theresienstadt. Unfortunately they both perished within the same year due to the harsh conditions there and due to starvation. Regina Löbnerová died on 23 August 1942, Sigmund Löbner on 30 December 1942. After twenty months in Theresienstadt, the family were separated. While his wife had to remain in the Ghetto there, Emil and Egon Löbner were deported on 28 September 1944 to Auschwitz concentration camp by transport Ek. His transport number was 364 of 2,500. Emil Löbner lost his life there, when exactly is unknown, probably on the day of his arrival. Twenty-two days later, on 19 October 1944, also Josefina Löbnerová was deported to Auschwitz and murdered immediately after arrival. Also, all three surviving sisters of Emil Löbner became victims of the Shoah. Mathilda and Erna were murdered in October and November 1941 in Łódź Ghetto, Levana on 8 October 1942 in Treblinka extermination camp. Both Löbner sons could survive the Shoah. A photograph shows them both in the 1960s in Israel. Vilém Löbner emigrated to Palestine in 1939. Egon Löbner was deported to Auschwitz too, on the same train like his father, was a forced laborer there, sent on a death march to Gross-Rosen und was transferred to Flossenbürg, where he had to work for Messerschmitt. In May 1945, he was liberated by General Patton's Third Army. He went back to Pilsen, completed high school and emigrated to the United States, became a renowned scientist in the field of optoelectronics, married and had three children. He testified in Auschwitz trials in Germany and was an important testimony of the Shoah. He died on 30 December 1989 in Palo Alto, California. Also Emil Löbner's brother Walter could survive Auschwitz. He emigrated as well and died on 18 August 1989 in Haifa, Israel. |
| | HERE LIVED; JOSEFÍNA LÖBNEROVÁ; BORN 1897; DEPORTED 1942; TO THERESIENSTADT; MURDERED 1944; IN AUSCHWITZ | Schwarzova 1847/50; 49°43′53″N 13°21′53″E | Josefina Klara Löbnerová née Köserová was born on 23 November 1897. Her parents were Rudolf Köser and Vilhelmina née Möller. She was married to Emil Löbner (born on 26 April 1897). The couple had two sons: Egon (born on 24 February 1924) and Vilém (born on 13 March 1926). She was a housewife, the family was wealthy and the children grew up in a bilingual environment, with Czech and German-speaking nannies. After the German occupation and the destruction of Czechoslovakia by the Nazs, she was terrified and wanted to leave immediately. Her husband was reluctant and therefore emigration plans of the couple were not realized. Though in 1939, their younger son Vilém left for Palestine. The family lost her villa, confiscated by the Nazis and had to move to Kollárovy 18. On 18 January 1942 she, her husband and their son Egon were deported from Pilsen to Theresienstadt concentration camp by transport R. Her transport number was 407 of 1,000. After twenty months in Theresienstadt, the couple were separated. Her husband and her son were sent to Auschwitz concentration camp on 28 September 1944, where Emil Löbner was murdered by the Nazis. Twenty-two days later, on 19 October 1944, also Josefina Löbnerová was deported to Auschwitz. Her number on transport Es was 1403 of 1,500. She lost her life there on the day of her arrival. Their son Egon Löbner could survive the Shoah. He returned to Pilsen, finished his high school and emigrated to the United States. There he became a renowned scientist in the field of optoelectronics, married and had three children. A photograph shows both brothers at a reunion in Israel in the 1960s. Egon Löbner died on 30 December 1989 in Palo Alto, California. |
| | HERE LIVED; JIŘÍ STEIN; BORN 1923; DEPORTED 1942; TO THERESIENSTADT; MURDERED 1942; IN RAASIKU | Klatovská tř. 1460/83; 49°44′02″N 13°22′14″E | Jiří Stein was born on 16 January 1923. His parents were Ota Stein and Hedvika née Hellerová. He had a younger sister, Hana (born 1926). His father owned a clothing store, the family lived in Husově ul. č. 20 in Pilsen. In school he was described as ″pretty quiet, strong, medium build, dark hair″. He was a classmate of Emil Ehrlich, described above, and was a member of a boy scout group called 'Stopa' (means ' a footprint' or 'a trace'). In 1939, after leaving school, he started to work as a laborer. On 22 January 1942, he was arrested and deported from Pilsen to Theresienstadt concentration camp by transport S, together with his parents and his sister. His transport number was 259 of 1,004. On 1 September 1942, he and his family were deported to Raasiku by transport Be. His transport number was 165 of 1,000. He and his family were murdered by the Nazis. |
| | HERE LIVED; OTA STEIN; BORN 1890; DEPORTED 1942; TO THERESIENSTADT; MURDERED 1942; IN RAASIKU | Klatovská tř. 1460/83; 49°44′02″N 13°22′14″E | Ota Stein was born on 24 July 1890. He was married to Hedvika née Hellerová. The couple had at least two children: Jiří (born 1923) and Hana (born 1926). He owned a clothing store, the family lived in Husově ul. č. 20 in Pilsen. On 22 January 1942 he and his family were arrested and deported from Pilsen to Theresienstadt concentration camp by transport S. His transport number was 261 of 1,004. On 1 September 1942, he and his family were deported to Raasiku by transport Be. His transport number was 167 of 1,000. He and his family were murdered by the Nazis. |
| | HERE LIVED; HANA STEINOVÁ; BORN 1926; DEPORTED 1942; TO THERESIENSTADT; MURDERED 1942; IN RAASIKU | Klatovská tř. 1460/83; 49°44′02″N 13°22′14″E | Hana Steinová was born on 7 November 1926. Her parents were Ota Stein and Hedvika née Hellerová. She had an older brother, Jiří (born 1923). Her last residence before deportation was in Pilsen. On 22 January 1942 she, her parents and her brother were arrested and deported from Pilsen to Theresienstadt concentration camp by transport S. Her transport number was 258 of 1,004. On 1 September 1942 they were deported to Raasiku by transport Be. Her transport number was 164 of 1,000. She and her family were murdered by the Nazis. |
| | HERE LIVED; HEDVIKA STEINOVÁ; BORN 1893; DEPORTED 1942; TO THERESIENSTADT; MURDERED 1942; IN RAASIKU | Klatovská tř. 1460/83; 49°44′02″N 13°22′14″E | Hedvika Steinová née Hellerová was born on 13 August 1893. She was married to Ota Stein, the owner of a clothing store. The couple had at least two children: Jiří (born 1923) and Hana (born 1926). Her last residence before deportation was in Husově ul. č. 20 in Pilsen. On 22 January 1942 she, her husband and their children were arrested and deported from Pilsen to Theresienstadt concentration camp by transport S. Her transport number was 260 of 1,004. On 1 September 1942, she and her family were deported to Raasiku by transport Be. Her transport number was 166 of 1,000. She and her family were murdered by the Nazis. |

== Sušice ==
A Jewish settlement in Sušice was first mentioned in the second half of the 16th century. In 1626, a Jewish cemetery was founded, in 1660, a synagogue, was erected. During WWI there was a decline in the Jewish community in Sušice and thereafter a rejuvenation. At the beginning of the 1930s the community numbered about 120 members, more than 90 were murdered during the Holocaust. In the late 1950s the old synagogue was replaced by a new one.

| Stone | Inscription | Location | Life and death |
|---|---|---|---|
| | HERE LIVED; BEDŘICH BORGER; BORN 1916; DEPORTED; TO KAUFERING; MURDERED 1945 | nám. Svobody 32; 49°13′52″N 13°31′15″E | Bedřich Borger was born on 11 February 1916 in Ostrava. His parents were Herman Borger and Valerie Borgerová. He was a clerk and was married to Vera née Fischerová, the daughter of Arnošt Fischer and Josefína Fischerová. His last residence before deportation was in Prague II, Černá 6. On 5 July 1943, he was arrested and deported from Prague to Theresienstadt concentration camp by transport De. His transport number was 469 of 604. On 1 October 1944, he was deported to Auschwitz concentration camp with transport Em. His transport number was 864 of 1,501. He was brought to death in 1945 in Kaufering. His wife could survive the Shoah. She married again and was thereafter named Vera Vrbová. She instigated the collocation of the three Stolpersteine for her parents and for her first husband. She also submitted the reports on her deceased relatives to Yad Vashem. |
| | HERE LIVED; ARNOŠT FISCHER; BORN 1884; DEPORTED; TO AUSCHWITZ; MURDERED 1942 | nám. Svobody 32; 49°13′52″N 13°31′15″E | Arnošt Fischer was born 26 December 1884 in Rychnov. His parents were Abraham Fischer and his wife Jindriška. He was a merchant and married to Josefína née Kohnová. The couple lived in Sušice and had at least one daughter, Vera. When and how Arnošt Fischer and his wife were transferred to Prague is not known. On 24 October 1942, the couple were deported from Prague to Theresienstadt concentration camp by transport Ca. His transport number was 482 of 1,004. On 26 October 1942, husband and wife were deported to Auschwitz concentration camp with transport By. His transport number was 1582 of 1,867. There, both Arnošt Fischer and Josefína Fischerová were murdered. Daughter Vera could survive the Shoah. She was first married to Bedřich Borger, who also lost his life in Auschwitz. Thereafter she remarried and was named Vera Vrbova. She instigated the collocation of the three Stolpersteine for her parents and for her first husband. |
| | HERE LIVED; JOSEFÍNA; FISCHEROVÁ; BORN 1888; DEPORTED; TO AUSCHWITZ; MURDERED 1942 | nám. Svobody 32; 49°13′52″N 13°31′15″E | Josefína Fischerová née Kohnová was born on 5 July 1888 in Bernartice. Her parents were Simon Kohn and Rena Kohnová. She married Arnošt Fischer and went to live with him in Sušice. The couple had at least one daughter, Vera. When and how Arnošt Fischer and his wife were transferred to Prague is not known. On 24 October 1942, the couple were deported from Prague to Theresienstadt concentration camp by transport Ca. Her transport number was 483 of 1,004. On 26 October 1942, husband and wife were deported to Auschwitz concentration camp with transport By. His transport number was 1583 of 1,867. There, both Arnošt Fischer and Josefína Fischerová were murdered. Daughter Vera could survive the Shoah. She was first married to Bedřich Borger, who also lost his life in Auschwitz. Thereafter she remarried and was named Vera Vrbova. She instigated the collocation of the three Stolpersteine for her parents and for her first husband. She also submitted the reports on her parents to Yad Vashem. |
| | HERE LIVED; KAREL GUTMANN; BORN 1875; DEPORTED 1943; TO THERESIENSTADT; MURDERED 27 May 1943 | nám. Svobody 30; 49°13′52″N 13°31′15″E | Karel Gutmann was born 21 September 1875. He was married to Karolína née Koretz. The couple had at least two sons: Otto (born 1904) and Rudolf (born 1906). The last residence of his family before deportation was in Sušice. On 30 November 1942, he, his wife and their son Otto were arrested and deported from Klatovy to Theresienstadt concentration camp by transport Ce. His transport number was 196 of 619. He was murdered on 27 May 1943 in Theresienstadt. All his close family members were murdered by the Nazis, his son Otto and his wife in the fall of 1943 at Auschwitz concentration camp, his second son Rudolf on 13 March 1945 in Grawinkel. |
| | HERE LIVED; OTTO GUTMANN; BORN 1904; DEPORTED 1942; TO THERESIENSTADT; MURDERED 6 September 1943; IN AUSCHWITZ | nám. Svobody 30; 49°13′52″N 13°31′15″E | Otto Gutmann, also Ota, was born on 5 January 1904. His parents were Karel Gutmann and Karolína née Koretz. He had a younger brother, Rudolf (born in 1906). The last residence of his family before deportation was in Sušice. On 30 November 1942, he and his patents were arrested and deported from Klatovy to Theresienstadt concentration camp by transport Ce. His transport number was 200 of 619. In Theresienstadt, his father was brought to death in May 1943. He was separated from his mother on 6 September 1943, when he was deported to Auschwitz concentration camp with transport Dl. His transport number was 713 of 2,484. According to several sources, Otto Gutmann was murdered in Auschwitz. His brother Rudolf was murdered on 13 March 1945 in Grawinkel. |
| | HERE LIVED; RUDOLF GUTMANN; BORN 1906; MURDERED 13 March 1945; IN GRAWINKEL | nám. Svobody 30; 49°13′52″N 13°31′15″E | Rudolf Gutmann was born 1906. His parents were Karel Gutmann and Karolína née Koretz. He had an older brother, Otto (born in 1904). The last residence of his family before deportation was in Sušice. He was married to Blazena. On 30 November 1942, his parents and his brother were deported to Theresienstadt concentration camp. Step by step all family members were murdered. First his father died in May 1943 in Theresienstadt. Then his brother was deported to Auschwitz concentration camp in September. Lastly his mother was deported to Auschwitz too and murdered there on 15 December 1943, the day of her arrival. The whereabouts of Rudolf Gutmann during these years unknown. But a postcard of his mother, thanking for a parcel, dated 15 October 1943, signed with the false name Herrmann Kreuzer, gives an indication, that he may have hidden in his home town. He was murdered on 13 March 1945 in Grawinkel in Thuringia. |
| | HERE LIVED; KAROLÍNA; GUTMANNOVÁ; BORN 1877; DEPORTED 1942; TO THERESIENSTADT; MURDERED 15 December 1943; IN AUSCHWITZ | nám. Svobody 30; 49°13′52″N 13°31′15″E | Karolína Gutmannová née Koretz was born on 19 December 1877 in Kolinec. Her parents were Nathan Koretz and Tereza. She was married to Karel Gutmann. The couple had at least two sons: Otto (born 1904) and Rudolf (born 1906). The last residence of her family before deportation was in Sušice. On 30 November 1942, she, her husband and their son Otto were arrested and deported from Klatovy to Theresienstadt concentration camp by transport Ce. Her transport number was 197 of 619. In Theresienstadt, the family was torn apart. First, on 27 May 1943, father Karel was brought to death. Then, on 6 September of the same year, son Otto was deported to Auschwitz concentration camp, where he was murdered. Lastly, mother Karolína was also deported to Auschwitz. Her number on transport Dr was 747 of 2,519. She was murdered on the day of her arrival, 15 December 1943, in one of the gas chambers in Auschwitz. Her brother Alois died on 13 August 1942 in the Łódź Ghetto, his wife Zdenka already in October 1941. Her second son, Rudolf, was murdered by the Nazis on 13 March 1945 in Grawinkel. |
| | HERE LIVED; ANTONIN KLINGER; BORN 1907; DEPORTED; TO AUSCHWITZ; Ermordet 1943 | Tomáše Garrigua Masaryka 23; 49°13′56″N 13°31′15″E | Antonin Klinger was born on 29 June 1907 to Josef Klinger and Hermina née Pollak (both see below). He had three brothers, including František (see below). He married Helena née Shtriker (see below). His last home address before the deportation was in Sušice. The couple was arrested and deported on 30 November 1942 from Klatovy with transport Ce to Theresienstadt concentration camp. His transport number was 123 and the one of his wife was 124. On 6 September 1943, he and his wife were deported to the Auschwitz concentration camp with Transport Dl. His transport number was the 999. There, the couple was murdered by the Nazis. His three brothers, a sister-in-law and two nieces, were all murdered in the course of the Shoah. |
| | HERE LIVED; FRANTISEK KLINGER; BORN 1897; DEPORTED; TO AUSCHWITZ; MURDERED 1943 | Tomáše Garrigua Masaryka 23; 49°13′56″N 13°31′15″E | František Klinger was born on 28 June 1897 to Josef Klinger and Hermina Pollak (both see below). He had four brothers. He married Františka, born in 1908 (see below). The couple had two daughters, Eva and Dagmar, born in 1932 and 1935 respectively (both below). His last home address before the deportation was in Sušice. The whole family was arrested and deported on 30 November 1942 from Klatovy with the transport Ce to the concentration camp Theresienstadt. His transport number was 114. Exactly one year later, on 30 November 1943, his older daughter was murdered in Theresienstadt. Two weeks later, on 15 December 1943, he was deported together with his wife and his younger daughter with transport Dr to the concentration camp Auschwitz. His transport number was the 1069. There, František Klinger, his wife and the second daughter were murdered by the Nazis. All his brothers and a sister-in-law were also murdered in Auschwitz. |
| | HERE LIVED; JOSEF KLINGER; BORN 1863; DEPORTED; TO THERESIENSTADT; DIED 1945; IN SUSICE | Tomáše Garrigua Masaryka 23; 49°13′56″N 13°31′15″E | Josef Klinger was born on 15 April 1863 as the son of Daniel and Johanna Klinger. He had three brothers and three sisters. He married Hermine née Pollak (1863–1946). The couple had eight children, but four of them died during or shortly after birth. Four sons, František (see above), Paul, Antonin (see above) and Ernst, were able to survive the birth. Until 1939 he led a trade business with agricultural products in the center of Sušice. Later-on, also his sons worked in the family business. All his descendants were exterminated by the Nazis. His sons and daughters-in-law were all murdered in Auschwitz concentration camp. One granddaughter died in Theresienstadt, another one in Auschwitz. Josef Klinger and his wife were deported to Theresienstadt concentration camp. They could survive the Shoah and returned to Sušice. But soon thereafter, both of them died – Josef on 28 July 1945, his wife on 20 April 1946. Not only were all four sons murdered by the Nazis, but also two daughters-in-law and two granddaughters. The fate of most of his siblings is unclear. His brother Markus died in 1930, his sister Berta (born 1870 or 1871), married to Heinrich Schnurmacher, was also murdered in Auschwitz in 1944. |
| | HERE LIVED; DAGMAR KLINGEROVÁ; BORN 1935; DEPORTED; TO AUSCHWITZ; MURDERED 1943 | Tomáše Garrigua Masaryka 23; 49°13′56″N 13°31′15″E | Dagmar Klingerová was born on 6 December 1935 as daughter of František Klinger and his wife Františka (both below). She had an older sister, Eva (see below). Their last address before the deportation was in Sušice. The whole family was arrested and deported on 30 November 1942 from Klatovy with the transport Ce to Theresienstadt concentration camp. Her transport number was 117. Her sister was murdered in Theresienstadt. Just over a year after their arrival, on 15 December 1943, she and her parents were deported to Auschwitz concentration camp with Transport Dr. Her transport number was the 1068. Dagmar Klingerová and her parents were murdered in Auschwitz by the Nazis. |
| | HERE LIVED; EVA KLINGEROVÁ; BORN 1932; DEPORTED; TO THERESIENSTADT; MURDERED 1943 | Tomáše Garrigua Masaryka 23; 49°13′56″N 13°31′15″E | Eva Klingerová was born on 25 February 1932 as the daughter of František Klinger and his wife Františka (both below). She had a younger sister, Dagmar (see above). Their last address before the deportation was in Sušice. The whole family was arrested and deported on 30 November 1942 from Klatovy with the transport Ce to Theresienstadt concentration camp. Her transport number was 116. Just over a year later, on 30 November 1943, she was murdered by the Nazis at Theresienstadt. Two weeks after her death her parents and her sister were deported to Auschwitz and murdered there. |
| | HERE LIVED; FRANTISKA KLINGEROVÁ; BORN 1908; DEPORTED; TO AUSCHWITZ; MURDERED 1943 | Tomáše Garrigua Masaryka 23; 49°13′56″N 13°31′15″E | Frantiska Klingerová was born on 25 November 1908. She was married to František Klinger (see above). The couple had two daughters, Eva and Dagmar, born in 1932 and 1935 respectively (both above). Their last address before deportation was in Sušice. The whole family was arrested and deported on 30 November 1942 from Klatovy with transport Ce to Theresienstadt concentration camp. Her transport number was 115. Exactly one year later, on 30 November 1943, her older daughter was murdered in Theresienstadt. Two weeks later, on 15 December 1943, she was deported together with her husband and her younger daughter with transport Dr to Auschwitz concentration camp. Their transport number was the 1070. There, Františka Klingerová, her husband and the second daughter were murdered by the Nazis. |
| | HERE LIVED; HELENA KLINGEROVÁ; BORN 1914; DEPORTED; TO AUSCHWITZ; MURDERED 1943 | Tomáše Garrigua Masaryka 23; 49°13′56″N 13°31′15″E | Helena Klingerová née Shtriker was born on 2 June 1914 in Mladá Boleslav. Her parents were Aharon Oto and Khaia. She was married to Antonin Klinger (see above). Their last address before deportation was in Sušice. The couple was arrested and deported on 30 November 1942 from Klatovy with transport Ce to Theresienstadt concentration camp. The transport numbers of the couple were 123 and 124. On 6 September 1943, she and her husband were deported to Auschwitz concentration camp with Transport Dl. Their transport numbers were 999 and 1000. There both were murdered by the Nazis. Many of her husband's relatives also fell victim to the Shoah. |
| | HERE LIVED; HERMINA KLINGEROVÁ; BORN 1873; DEPORTED; TO THERESIENSTAD; DIED 1946; IN SUSICE | Tomáše Garrigua Masaryka 23; 49°13′56″N 13°31′15″E | Hermina Klingerová née Pollak was born on 25 February 1873. She married Josef Klinger (see above). The couple had eight children, but four of them died during or shortly after birth. Four sons: Frantisek (see above), Paul, Anton (see above) and Ernst, were able to survive infancy. Her husband ran an extensive trade business in agricultural products in the center of Sušice until 1939. The sons later worked in the family business. The old couple was deported to Theresienstadt Concentration Camp and survived there despite hunger and lack of hygiene. Hermina Klingerovà survived all her children and her husband. The four sons who had originally survived were all murdered in Auschwitz concentration camp. Her husband died on 29 July 1945, just months after the liberation. She herself died on 20 April 1946 in Sušice. |

== Dates of collocations ==
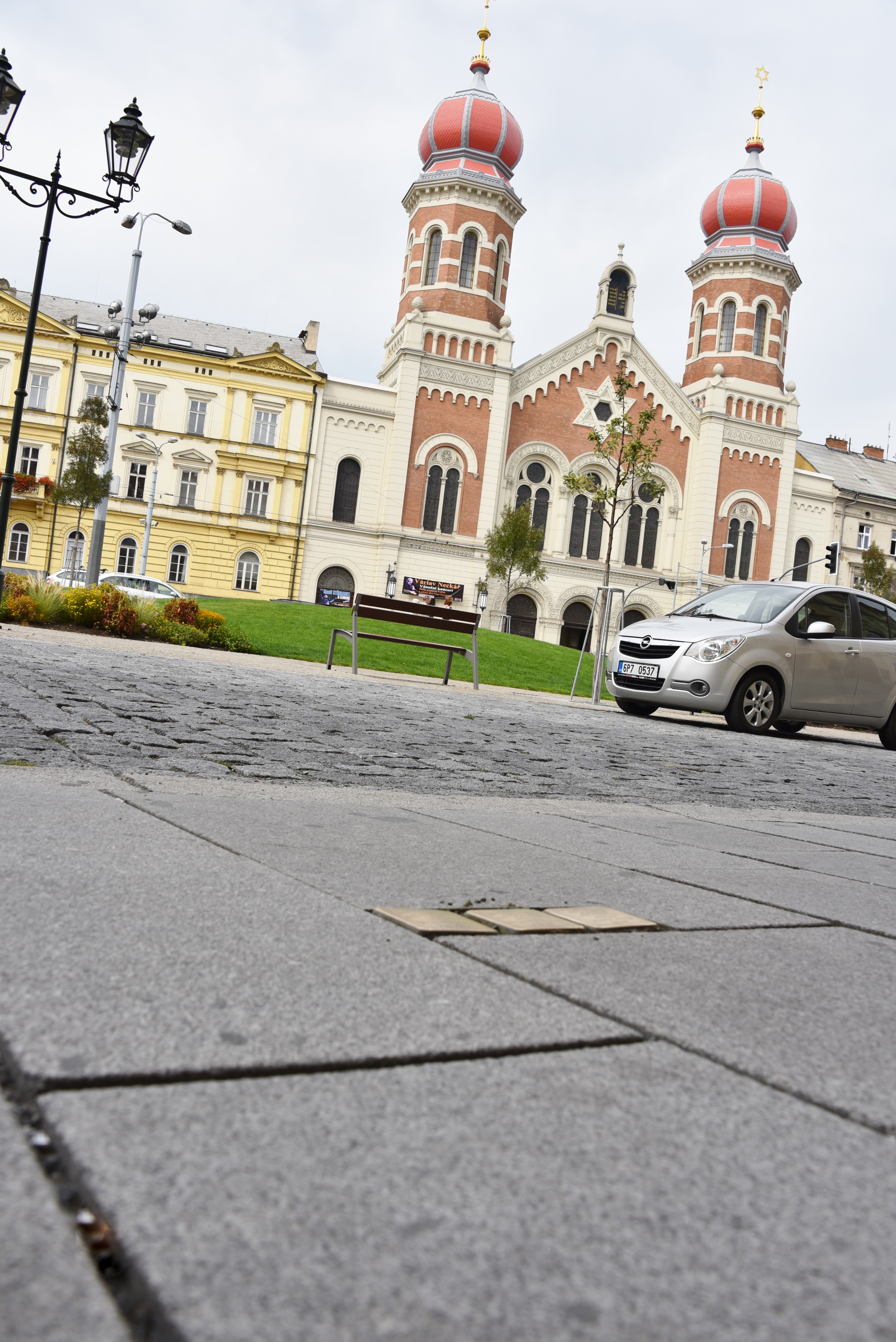
Stolpersteine for family Fanta in Plzeň, in the background the Great Synagogue

The Stolpersteine in the Plzeň Region were collocated by the artist himself on the following dates:

- Horažďovice: 14 September 2014 (family Adler/Adlerová, Z. Mautner), 3 August 2015 and 3 August 2016 (10)
- Plzeň: 28 October 2012
- Sušice: 2 August 2015 (family Gutmann/Gutmannová) and 4 August 2016 (Borger/Fischer/Fischerová)

The Stolpersteine of Horažďovice were initiated by the Scrolls Committee of the Westminster Synagogue, chaired by Alberta Strage.

== See also ==
- List of places with Stolpersteine
