= Winton Train =

2009 train journey commemorating 1939 kindertransport from Prague to London

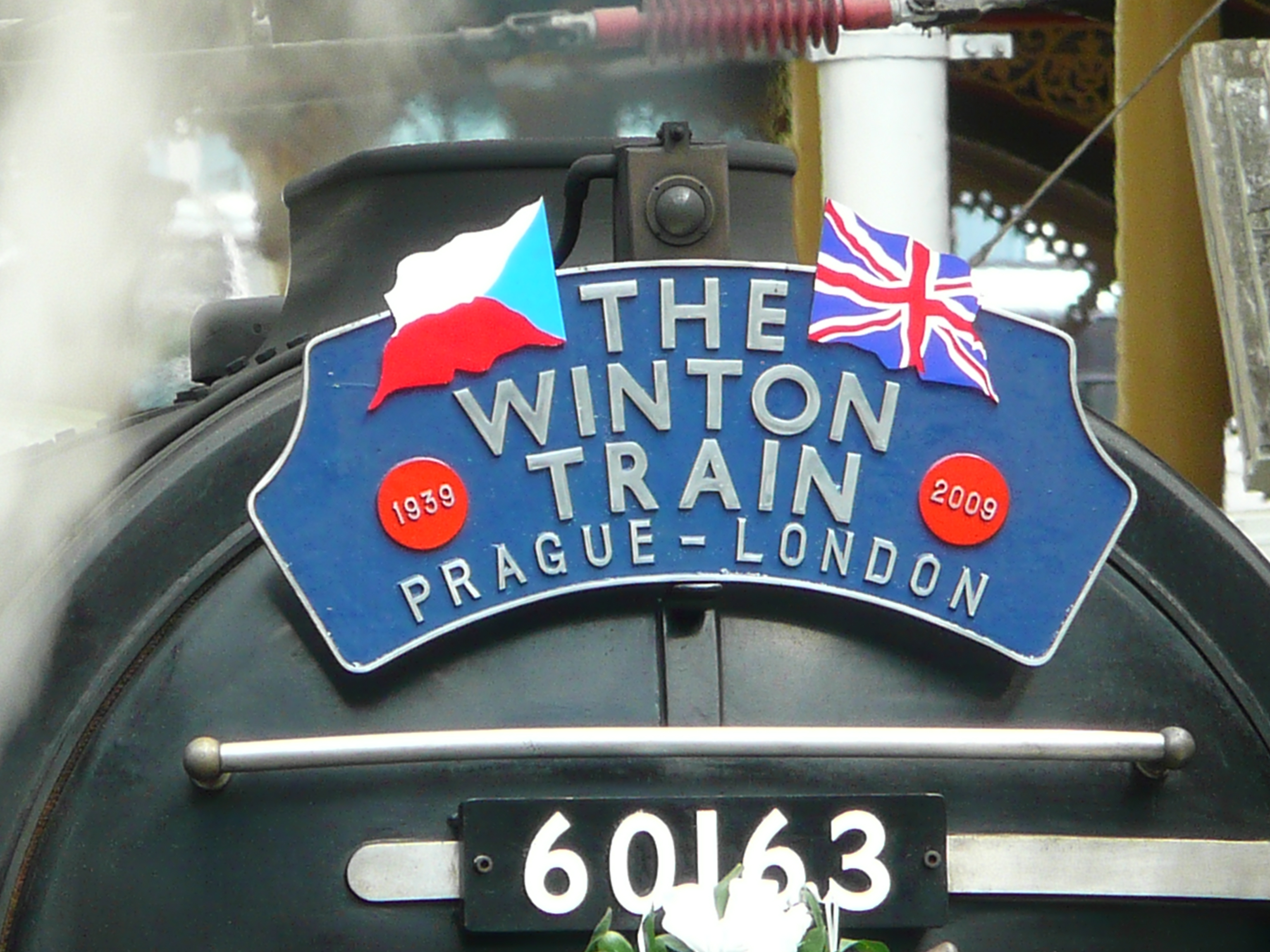
The headboard worn by No. 60163 Tornado from Harwich to Liverpool Street station, the final leg of the Winton Train from Prague

The Winton Train was a private passenger train that travelled from the Czech Republic to Great Britain in September 2009 in tribute to the wartime efforts of Sir Nicholas Winton, described as the 'British Schindler' for his part in saving refugee children from Czechoslovakia.

As a result of Sir Nicholas' efforts in the months leading up to the outbreak of World War II in 1939, a total of seven locomotives transported 669 Czechoslovak children of mainly Jewish heritage from Prague to safety in Great Britain.

Sir Nicholas' kindertransport efforts remained largely unrecognised until 1988, when they came to public attention after his wife found a scrapbook in their attic documenting the details. Only then did the individuals whom Winton arranged to have transported to safety as children learn the story of how they survived the Holocaust. As the majority of 'Winton's Children' (as they came to be known) were Jewish, it is believed this saved them from certain death had they stayed in Czechoslovakia. As of 2009, the direct descendants of Winton's Children numbered over 5000 people.

The 2009 tribute Winton Train carried some of the individuals Sir Nicholas arranged to have transported to safety in 1939, along with their families, as it retraced the original kindertransport route taken by the trains on which they rode as children to safety in Great Britain 70 years earlier. The Winton Train departed on 1 September 2009, the 70th anniversary of the eighth, and intended last, train arranged by Winton to carry children to safety but was prevented from doing so due to the outbreak of World War II on that very day. It departed from Prague Main railway station and travelled through Germany and the Netherlands. After a transfer by ferry to Harwich, the journey resumed by train again to arrive in London's Liverpool Street station on 4 September, where it was met by the 100-year-old Sir Nicholas himself. For the journey across mainland Europe, the train was formed of period carriages and was hauled by historically authentic steam locomotives, while the British leg was hauled by 60163 Tornado, a brand-new, main-line British steam locomotive completed in 2008, along with carriages that were constructed in the 1950s.

The tribute train was the centrepiece of a wider cultural awareness project known as 'Inspiration by Goodness', organised by the Czech government.

== Background ==
=== Original Winton trains ===
Between March and September 1939, the months leading up to the outbreak of World War II, Nicholas Winton, a 29-year-old British stockbroker whose parents were of German Jewish descent, organised eight trains to transport mainly Jewish Czech and Slovak refugee children from Czechoslovakia to homes in Britain.

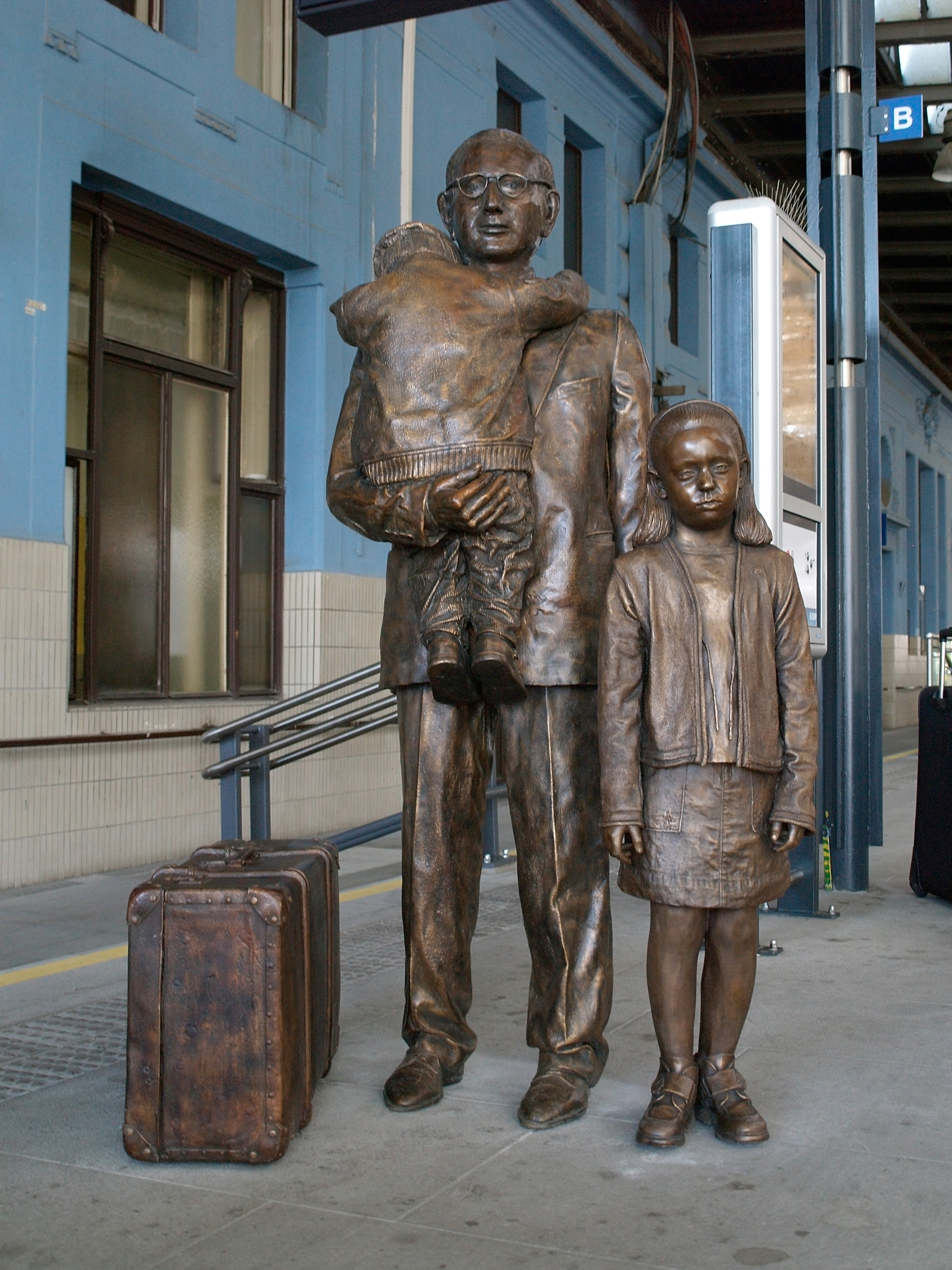
A statue of Sir Nicholas Winton by Flor Kent, unveiled in Prague Main railway station on 1 September 2009, the day of departure of the Winton tribute train. The girl is modelled on the granddaughter of a girl saved by one of Winton's original trains in 1939.

In 1939, Winton cancelled a trip to a Swiss holiday resort to go to Prague, having heard of a growing refugee crisis resulting from the German occupation of Czechoslovakia from a friend. His friend was working in the British embassy for the British Committee for Refugees from Czechoslovakia, which was already working to help adults escape from Czechoslovakia. When Winton learned that refugee children could not leave unless accompanied, he decided to arrange their evacuation to Britain. While the Winton evacuations later became known by the collective label of the children's Kindertransports, which were officially being organised elsewhere in other countries, no official Kindertransports had been arranged in Prague at that time. Later rescues were organised by Gertruida Wijsmuller-Meijer from the Netherlands in cooperation with Jewish committees in Britain, Holland, Nazi-Germany and Nazi-Austria from December 1938 through August 1939, totalling 10,000 children.

Winton organised the transfer of the children from the Nazi-appointed Protectorate of Bohemia and Moravia to homes in Britain, in the process arranging the necessary bonds and permits for their departure, and finding the families in Britain who would receive the children. Winton and a team identified those children most at risk from the thousands of refugees driven south following the Nazi invasion of the Sudetenland. For each child to be accepted, British officials required a confirmed foster home and a £50 guarantee.

Beginning in March, Winton organised eight trains, which in total transported 669 mainly Jewish children from Nazi occupied Czechoslovakia to Great Britain. A ninth and final train with 250 children on board was stopped at the last minute, due to the outbreak of the war. Only two children on this ninth aborted train survived the war. According to Channel 4 News reporting on the 2009 Winton Train, "Sir Nicholas has said many times that the vision that haunts him most is the families waiting at Liverpool Street for the train that never arrived".

The original trains left from Prague Wilson railway station (now Prague Main station). While most of the children were met by their new families at London's Liverpool Street station, some of the children got off the trains at Harwich, where they were placed with local families. Few if any of the Winton children saw their parents again.

Winton's efforts did not come to public light until 1988, when his wife discovered papers in their loft, whereupon Winton began to publicly talk about his work, and he came to be known as the 'British Schindler', in comparison to Oskar Schindler. Sir Nicholas himself believed this was undeserved, because unlike Schindler, his life had never been in danger.

=== Inspiration by Goodness project ===
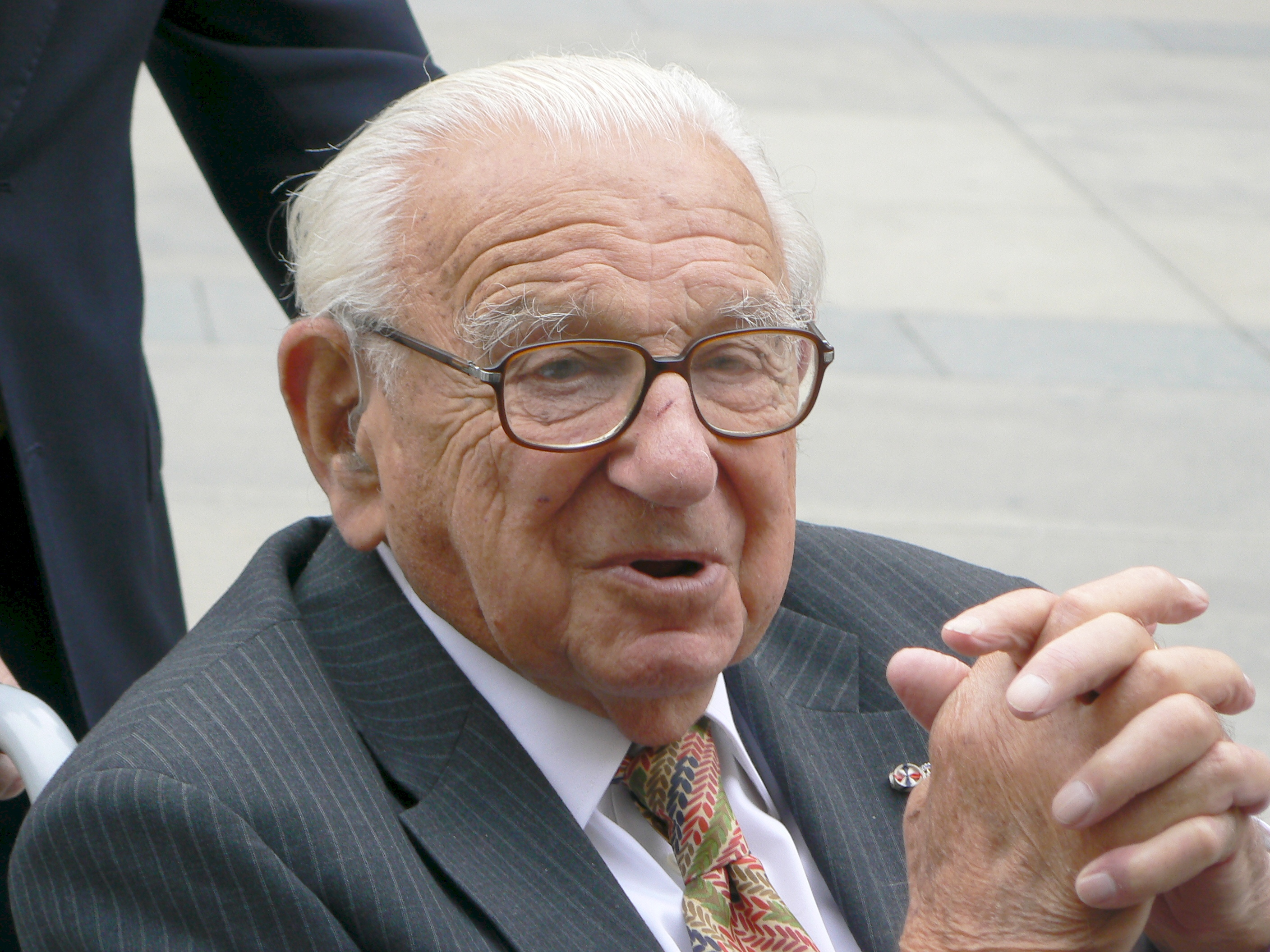
Sir Nicholas Winton in Prague, October 2007

A project to run a train in tribute to the original Winton trains was announced on 21 January 2008 as the Train Prague – London project, and the organisers were negotiating to have the train named after Sir Nicholas. The train was run by Czech Railways and sponsored by the Czech government, with the project being dedicated to their holding of the Presidency of the Council of the European Union from January to June 2009. The train was part of a wider project encompassing social and cultural events along the route to "inspire young people through the deeds of Nicholas Winton", and with the theme of "Inspiration by Goodness", it incorporated art, film, photographic and literary contests by university students and school children.

The project was to follow on from the work of documentary film maker Matej Mináč about Sir Nicholas, including his new film project Nicky's Family. While travelling on the train, Mináč filmed scenes for a new version of the Winton story. The Czech Senate President Přemysl Sobotka said of the project that it "should warn against rising extremism and anti-Semitism in Europe and in the world".

== 2009 Winton Train ==
=== Journey ===
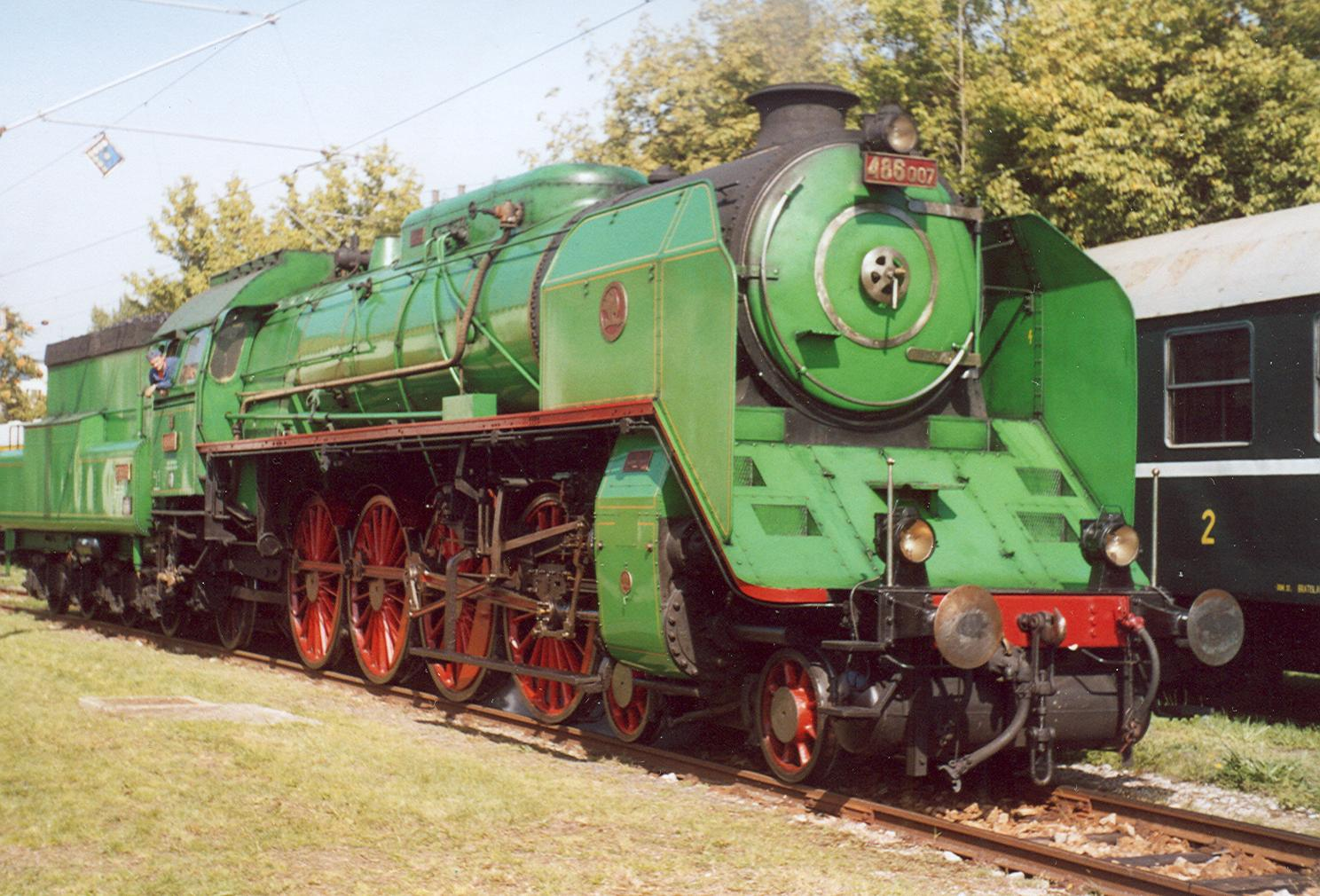
Locomotive No. 486.007, used in the Czech Republic (front)

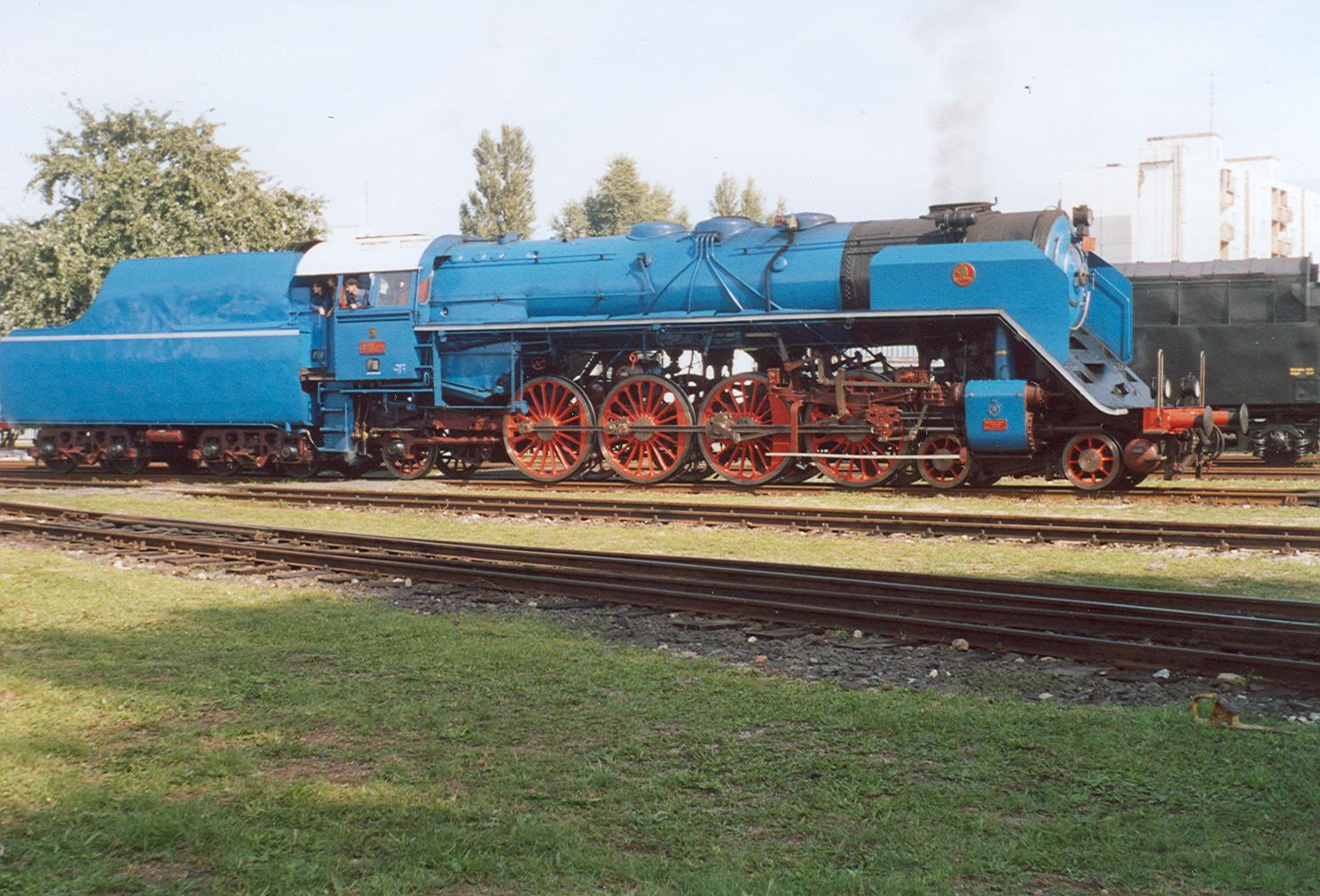
Locomotive No. 498.022, used in the Czech Republic (rear)

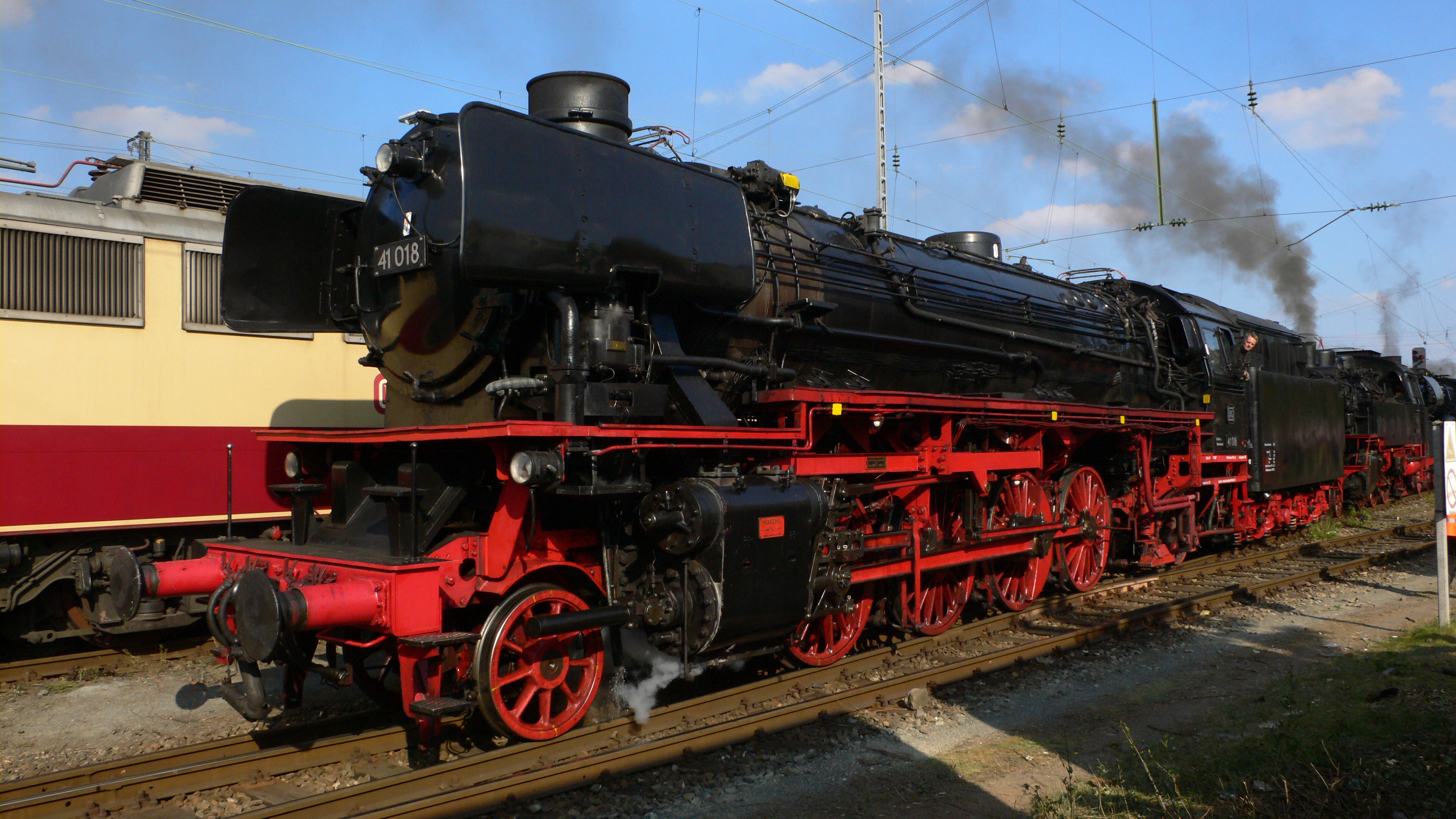
Locomotive No. 41 018, used in Germany

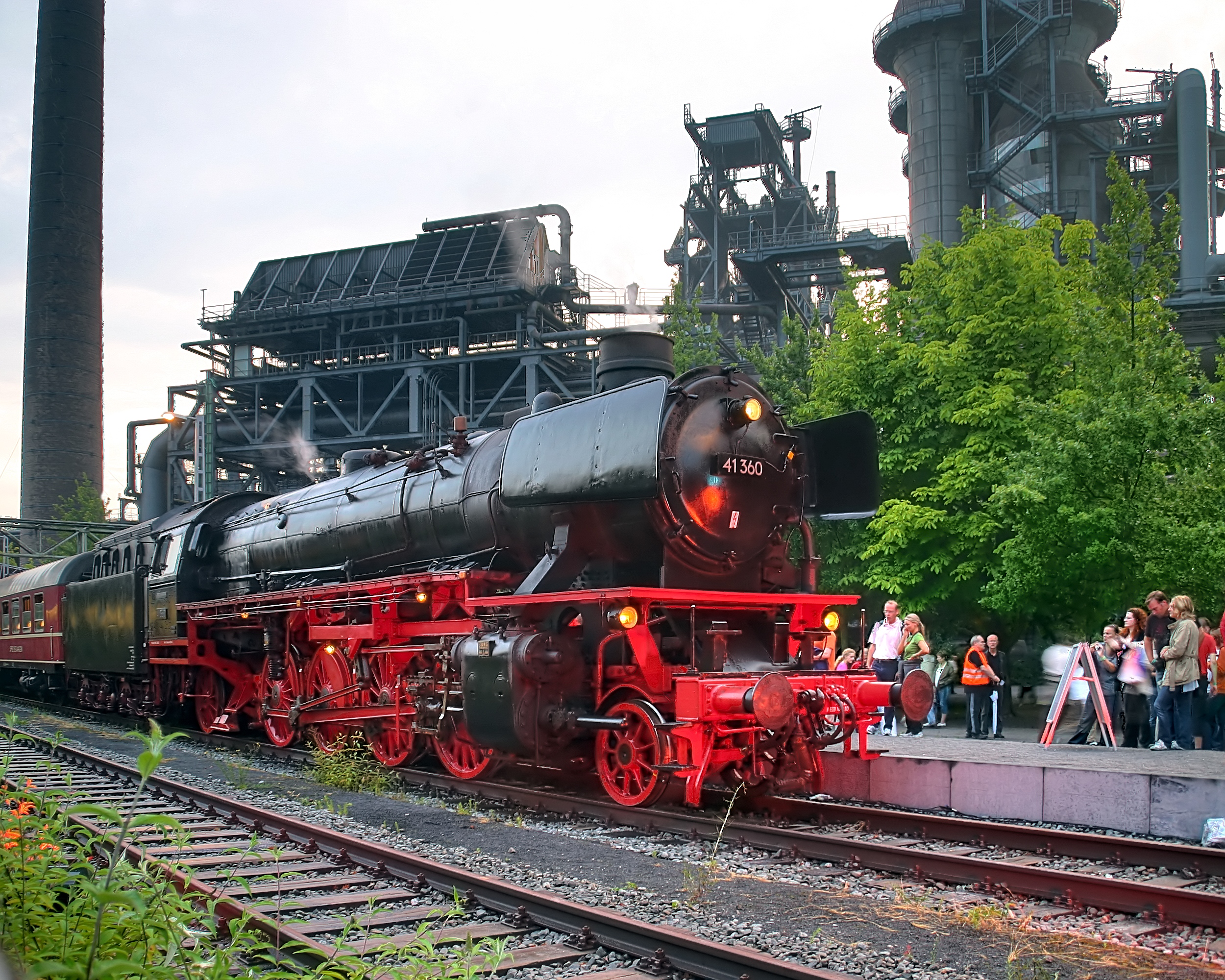
Locomotive No. 41 360, used in Germany

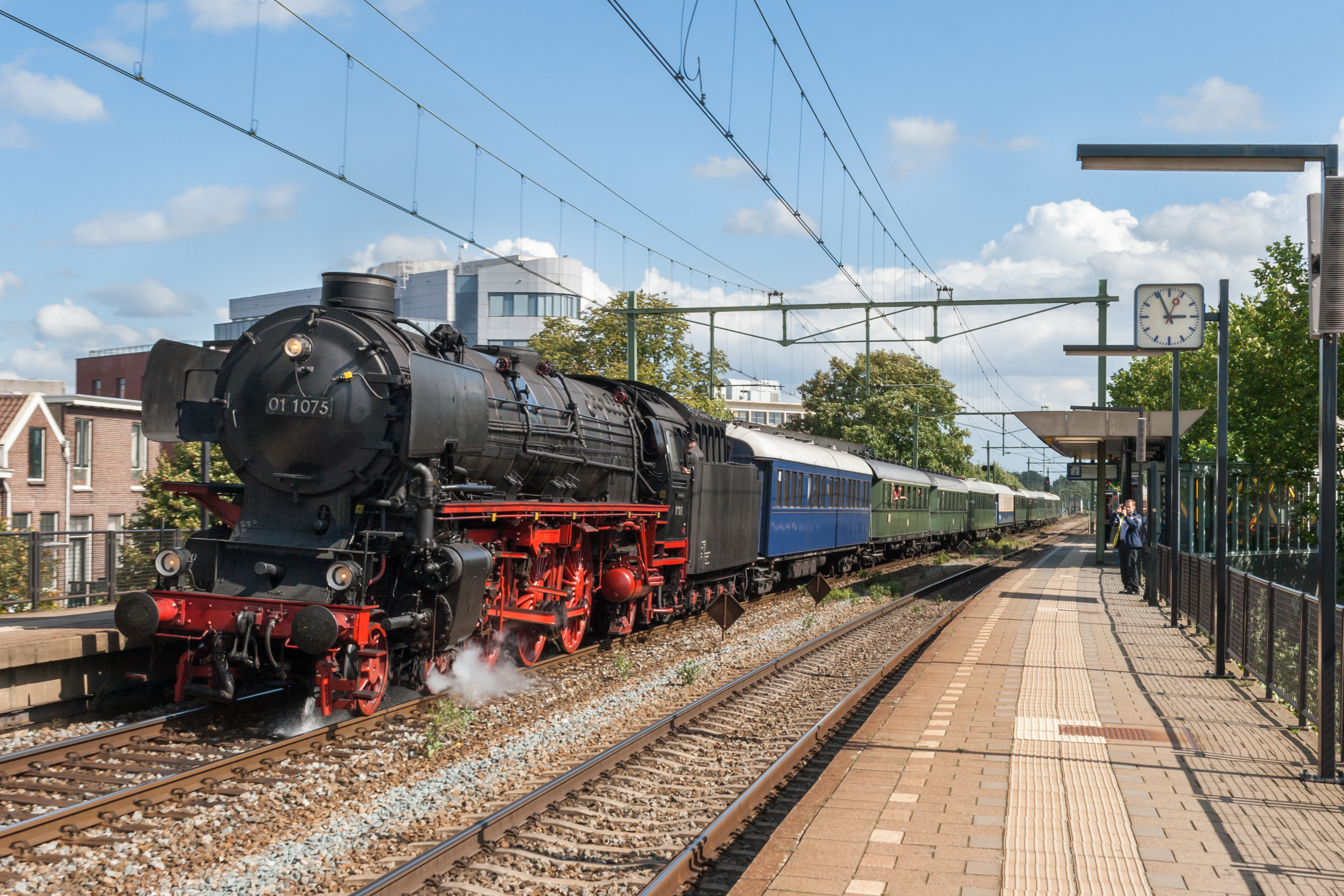
Locomotive No. 01 1075 with the Winton Train passing Arnhem Velperpoort railway station in the Netherlands

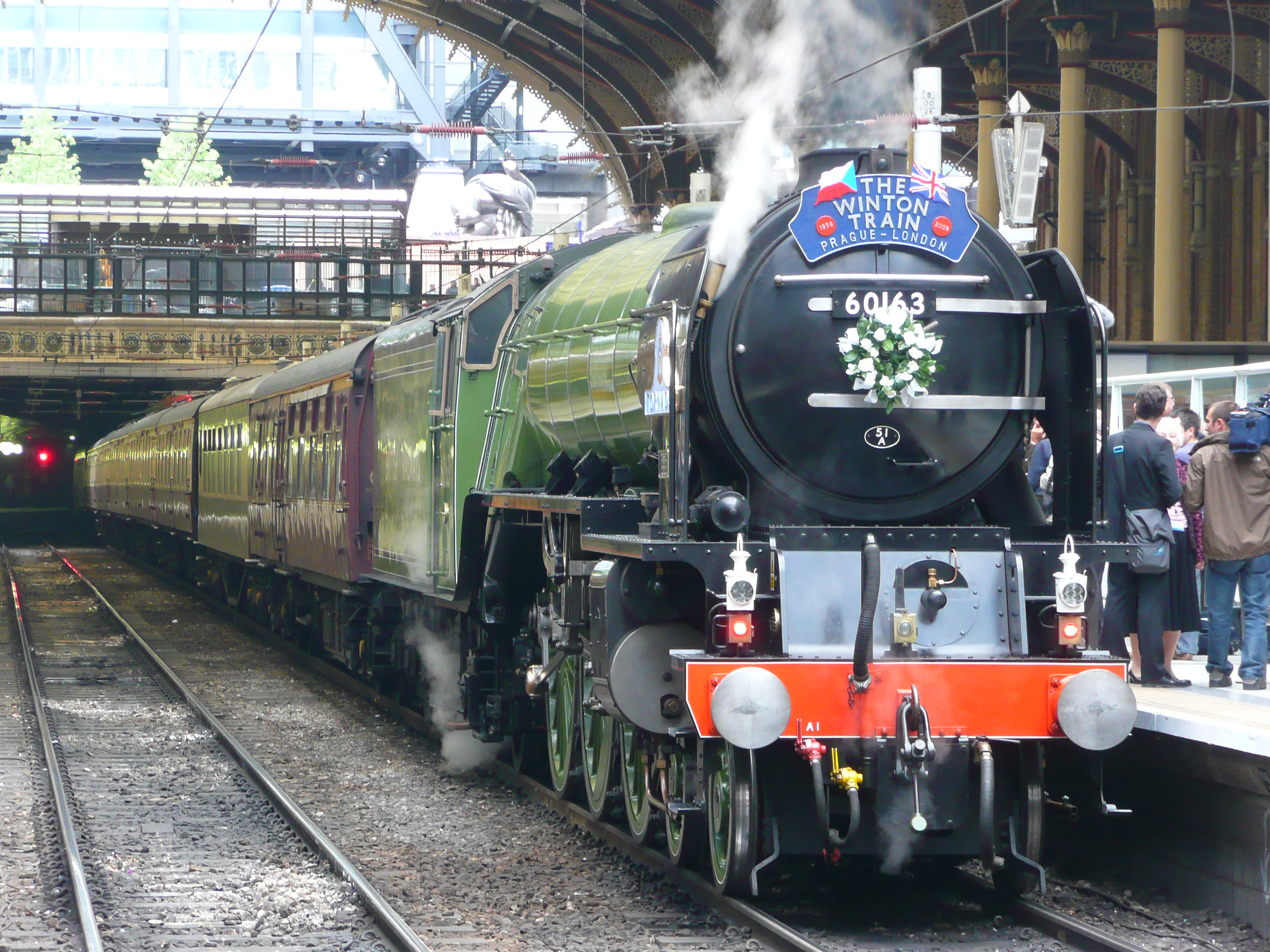
Locomotive No. 60163 Tornado arriving with the Winton Train in London Liverpool Street station, England

The motive power for the train journey was provided by six different steam locomotives in total, two as a double-headed train in the Czech Republic due to the terrain, two in Germany, one in the Netherlands and one in Great Britain. The entire journey was scheduled to take four days, involving a European train leg, a crossing by the passengers on a ferry and a British train leg. It covered a distance of 1,296 kilometres (805 mi), of which 1,139 kilometres (708 mi) was the train journey across mainland Europe.

On 1 September the train departed Prague Main railway station. On this first day it travelled to the German city of Nuremberg, crossing the Czech–German border at Furth im Wald in the Bavarian Forest. The following day, the train was to travel across Germany to Cologne, via Frankfurt. Instead of Frankfurt however, it travelled via Wiesbaden and the right bank of the River Rhine. On the third day, the train arrived on the North Sea coast at the Dutch ferry port, Hook of Holland, crossing the Dutch–German border at Emmerich am Rhein and passing through the Netherlands via Rotterdam. The passengers disembarked the train to cross the North Sea to Great Britain overnight on the Stena Line ferry Stena Britannica to Harwich, a port in the East of England on the country boundary between Essex and Suffolk. The British train journey formed the fourth day of the journey, travelling from Harwich to the London terminus of Liverpool Street station.

On this final day the train departed Harwich International railway station at 09:12. It travelled via Colchester and Chelmsford, arriving at Liverpool Street station at 10:37 on Platform 10. Platform 10 was the platform number that the original Winton trains had used.

Sir Nicholas, now 100 years old, met the train at Liverpool Street as guest of honour.

Also at Liverpool Street to meet the train was Štefan Füle, the Czech Minister for European Affairs, and a former Czech ambassador to Britain.

=== Motive power and rolling stock ===
Travelling through the Czech Republic from Prague to Furth im Wald, the train was double-headed by locomotives No. 486.007 and 498.022, with 486.007 leading as the train left Prague. No. 486.007, known as the Green Anton is a preserved steam locomotive built in 1936 and based in Vrútky, Slovakia, owned by Slovak Republic Railways (ŽSR). It is one of the de:ČSD-Baureihe 486.0 class, and has a green livery. No. 498.022, which is one of the de:ČSD-Baureihe 498.0 class, has a blue livery and is owned by Czech Railways, who store it at Libeň in Prague, Czech Republic.

Travelling through Germany from Furth im Wald to Emmerich am Rhein, the train was hauled by locomotive No. 41 018. No. 41 018 is a preserved steam locomotive built in 1939 and based at the Augsburg Railway Park railway museum in Augsburg, Bavaria. It is one of the locomotive class DRG Class 41, and it is owned by DG München.

As the train travelled through the Netherlands from Emmerich am Rhein to Hook of Holland, it was hauled by Locomotive No. 01 1075. No. 01 1075 is a preserved steam locomotive built in 1940 and based at the Stoom Stichting Nederland (SSN) railway museum in Rotterdam.

Travelling through England (from Harwich to London), the train was hauled by No. 60163 Tornado, a British mainline steam locomotive built in 2008 by the A1 Steam Locomotive Trust, the construction of which began in 1994 and was completed in 2008.

The passenger rolling stock for the European leg from Prague to Hook of Holland comprised nine historic railway carriages of Hungarian and German origin, with a capacity for 240 passengers. The train included the blue liveried state luxury saloon carriage of Tomáš Garrigue Masaryk, the first president of Czechoslovakia, which entered service on 7 March 1930, Masaryk's 80th birthday.

For the British leg, behind Tornado and her maroon support coach, the train was headed by Pegasus, a cream and brown Pullman Bar Car incorporating the Trianon Bar, followed by the historic 1950s built red and cream The Royal Scot rake of British Railways Mark 1 passenger coaches of Riviera Trains. Pegasus was built in 1951 for the famous Golden Arrow boat train, and later rebuilt for heritage mainline use.

=== Passengers ===
The 2009 Winton train carried 170 passengers, including 22 of those originally rescued, who came to be known as 'Winton's Children'. Passengers included the first, second, or even third generation of descendants of the original children rescued by Sir Nicholas. The descendants of the children Sir Nicholas rescued had by 2009 grown to number 5,000 people. Passengers on the 2009 train also included Sir Nicholas's daughter Barbara. Other survivors who did not travel on the reunion train instead met it at Liverpool Street.

== Subsequent projects ==
It was the hope of the project to follow up the 2009 Winton Train to London with other Winton Trains to other European cities, and for it to become a tradition. In May 2011, an exhibition entitled Winton's Trains opened in London at Liverpool Street station.
