= Jiří Sozanský =

Czech artist (born 1946)

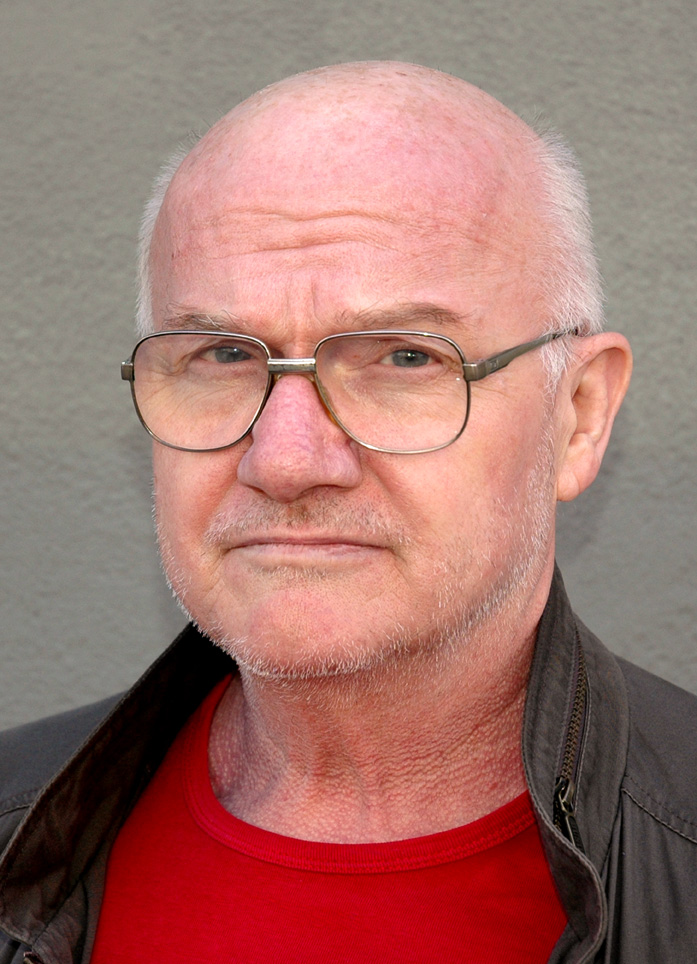
- Jiří Sozanský (2012)
- Born: 27 July 1946 (age 79); Prague, Czechoslovakia
- Education: Academy of Fine Arts in Prague
- Known for: sculptor, painter, printmaker, creator of environments
- Spouse: Olga Sozanská

Jiří Sozanský (born 27 June 1946) is a Czech sculptor, painter and graphic artist. He came from a poor background and worked in blue-collar jobs before being accepted as an exceptional talent to study at the Academy of Fine Arts in Prague. He took manual jobs also as a student and graduate to keep his personal and creative freedom. He is an amateur boxer, founder of the Boxart group.

His life was brutally affected by the Warsaw Pact invasion of Czechoslovakia and he was deeply touched by the sacrifice of Jan Palach. Sozanský was active organizer of various unofficial meetings and artistic activities at the Terezín Memorial or Old Most, demolished for coal mining, throughout the normalization until the fall of the communist regime. Then in the communist prison in Valdice and communist concentration camps at uranium mines in the Příbram District, or in besieged Sarajevo. In his work he consistently commemorates political prisoners and victims of the communist regime (Milada Horáková, Jan Zahradníček, Ivan Martin Jirous, Václav Havel, and others) and refers to literature sources, such as Samuel Beckett's Stories and Texts for Nothing, Orwell's novel 1984, and Václav Havel, Primo Levi's and Rudolf Höss's writings. He is a recipient of the award Knight of Czech Culture, the certificate Participant of the Resistance and Opposition to Communism and was awarded For his extraordinary contribution to the reflection of modern history by the Institute for the Study of Totalitarian Regimes. He is the author of the triptych Jan Palach - Ascension at Karolinum and Memorial to the Victims of the August 1968 Invasion and the Victims of the 1969 Protests for Wenceslas Square.

== Life ==
Jiří Sozanský was born on 27 June 1946 in Prague. He was born to parents who met on the barricades during the Prague Uprising and married soon after. He never knew his biological father Ivan Sozansky, who came from Subcarpatian Ukraine. Ivan Sozansky was arrested in 1948 while trying to cross the state border, but managed to escape from prison. It has not been possible to trace whether he was forcibly deported to the Soviet Union after the war. In 1952 a court declared Ivan Sozanský missing.

Jiří grew up with his mother in very poor circumstances and learned early in his childhood that he had to fend for himself. His mother was a trained hairdresser and, thanks to her occupation, had a wealth of social contacts. Later she remarried and moved with Jiří to Pec pod Sněžkou for a time to meet a new partner. She separated from her partner when Jiří was 10 years old. At that time, he spent weekends and part of his holidays with his grandmother Veronika and aunt Milena, where he met a year older Josef Kapín, later boxing champion, with whom he met again as an adult during boxing training. Aunt Milena worked as a curator at the National Gallery, where Jiří sometimes came to see her with his mother and learned about Czech Baroque art. Around the age of 13, his mother arranged a visit of the sculptor Jan Kodet, who first bought his drawing and encouraged him to become an artist.

After graduating from primary school, he trained as a mason in the company Pozemní stavby (Ground Construction) in 1960–1963. Active sportsmen worked as teachers at the school and under the influence of Václav Pšenička Jiří Sozanský started to train weightlifting at the age of 15. The librarian of Pozemní stavby introduced Sozanský to the music theorist Jaromír Paclt, who lent him books by French existentialists and publications on modern world art. Thanks to Paclt, he also met Zbyněk Sekal. Artist of the enterprise Zdeněk Fultner founded an art club for him, provided him with painting materials and supported him in his preparation for studying at the Academy of Fine Arts in Prague. After graduating from the apprenticeship, he passed the entrance exams for evening studies at the Václav Hollar School of Graphic Arts, but was dissatisfied with the low standard of the local teachers and left the school.

Since 1963 he worked as a bricklayer, scaffolder, later as a digger and after undergoing rheumatic fever and long-term rehabilitation as a stoker. From 1965 he was employed by the Geological survey as a driver's mate and for another year as a stagehand at Vinohrady Theatre. In the mid-1960s, he visited the Bohdan Kopecký exhibition and his expressive records of the devastated landscape of the Most region influenced Sozanský so much that he later created some of his major works there.

At that time, he attended drawing courses at Municipal House with the painter František Nedvěd and then with the graphic artist Miloš Čech at the National House in Vinohrady and prepared for the Academy exams. There he was admitted at the third attempt in 1967 as an exceptional talent and was excused from secondary education. In 1967–1973, he studied at the Academy of Fine Arts in Prague in the studio of prof. František Jiroudek, in the studio of drawing led by Jiří John and the studio of graphic arts, headed by prof. Ladislav Čepelák. It was here that he met Zuzana Nováčková, who helped him print graphic sheets after graduation. During his studies, he chose the Most region and Steel factory in Kladno, where he worked on temporary jobs in 1968–1971, for his plein air drawings. In the studio of František Jiroudek at the same time studied Petr Pavlík, Petr Kouba and Marie Blabolilová and two years older Miroslav Koval. Jiří Sozanský's closest friends during his studies were Antonín Kroča, Jiří Novák and the sculptor Lubomír Janečka.

As for his entire generation, the Soviet occupation in August 1968 and then the sacrifice of Jan Palach became a lifelong trauma for Jiří Sozanský. He repeatedly reflects both events in his work, which focuses on extreme situations. In 2024, he created the monumental Memorial to the Victims of the August 1968 Invasion and the Victims of the 1969 Protests. The memorial is provisionally located in the neighbourhood of the Museum Kampa and is destined for final installation near the National Museum in Prague. The early 1970s for him were marked by scepticism as to whether art still had any meaning in the new reality of an occupied country. Sozansky rejected passivity and decided to search for the causes of evil. While still a student, he made a trip to Sachsenhausen Concentration Camp, then to Theresienstadt Ghetto, and in 1978 he went to Auschwitz with Ivan Bukovský. In Terezín, where he commuted regularly in the second half of the 1970s, studying archives with prisoners' testimonies helped him to find an important theme and overcome a creative crisis.

In 1971, while studying, he married his first wife, Jaroslava, with whom he has a son, Jiří. The marriage gradually broke down under the pressure of external circumstances of the normalisation period, problems with obtaining an apartment and existential worries, and ended in divorce in 1985. In 1988 Jiří Sozanský married the psychologist Olga Pajerová.

In 1970 Sozanský was introduced to Olbram Zoubek by his former shift foreman from the heating plant Ladislav Junek, who was a plasterer by profession. He got his first small studio in 1972 and at the same time had the opportunity to work on his sculptures in the studio of Olbram Zoubek. Ladislav Junek helped him with the moulding at first and Olbram Zoubek allowed him to cast some of the sculptures in a mixture of lead and tin. Sozanský finished studies at the Academy with honours in 1973, defending his diploma thesis on the subject of human suffering, where, in addition to paintings and drawings, he also presented his sculptural works. After graduating from the Academy, Sozanský continued to work in manual professions in order to maintain his personal independence and not be restricted in his own work. He did not become a member of any organization and did not apply for scholarships awarded by the Official Union of Czechoslovak Visual Artists. Olbram Zoubek also supported him financially at that time and to repay the debt, Sozanský went to Litomyšl in 1974–1976 to work with a group of artists who restored the castle sgraffito. In the mid-1970s he suffered a serious illness, experienced a deep creative and existential crisis and was looking for a new subject for his work.

In 1973, he visited the Terezín Memorial for the first time and then, from 1977, went there to study the archives. Later he created sculptures and installations directly for the environment of the Small Fortress. Since the 1970s, he was in contact with Ota Kraus, who wrote hundreds of articles and several books about Nazism and the Holocaust. Sozanský attempted to depict this topic artistically only after the death of Ota Kraus at the beginning of the new millennium, under the influence of Primo Levi's texts and the writings of Rudolf Höss.

In the 1970s he met František Ronovský, Josef Jíra and Otakar Slavík. When Slavík signed Charter 77 and was about to lose his studio, Sozanský made a fictitious exchange with him for his rented warehouse in Libeň, allowing Slavík to use the studio until he emigrated to Vienna. Sozanský was also in contact with Vladimír Janoušek and Adriena Šimotová, and was familiar with the work of Alina Szapocznikow and Erzsébet Schaár, whose existential works are close to his nature. In 1976 he took part in a collective exhibition of young artists, which ended in a confrontation with a member of the normalized official Union of Czechoslovak Visual Artists Vladimir Šolta. In 1978, Petr Pavlík together with Jiří Sozanský and curator Marcela Pánková organized a generational exhibition Confrontation at the Czechoslovak Academy of Sciences in Krč. The exhibition was a direct reaction to the impotent work of young authors who met the criteria of the selection committee of the normalized official Union of Czechoslovak Visual Artists. and was prematurely terminated at the intervention of the Communist party authorities.

During the period of the most rigid normalization (1978–1979), when many artists were not allowed to exhibit, together with P. Pavlík, I. Bukovský, J. Načeradský and J. Kroutvor, he was meeting with professor Jiří Kotalík and co-organised visits to the studios of his generational peers and important artists of the 1960s generation. In 1979, together with Ivan Bukovský, he participated in a forensic autopsy, and this experience influenced his artistic means for a long time. In the 1970s he became closely acquainted with the texts of Franz Kafka, which then indirectly influenced his drawings and objects from 1978 to 1985. Much more clearly reflected in Sozansky's work were the Stories and Texts for Nothing by Samuel Beckett (the Outsiders series) and then especially Orwell's novel 1984.

At the turn of the 1970s and 1980s he was friends with Jiří Načeradský and Zdeněk Beran. He invited both of them together with Oldřich Kulhánek to a private symposium at the Small Fortress in 1980. Thanks to Ivan Neumann, who worked in the Aleš South Bohemian Gallery in Hluboká nad Vltavou in the 1970s, and also thanks to the support of the director of the National Gallery Jiří Kotalík for the entire Sozanský generation, purchases of his works for state collections were made in the late 1970s. In 1981–1982, he visited Starý Most, where he realized some of his projects (Zone, Escape - Most 82, Process) in the ruins of an old building that had to give way to coal mining. In 1982, Meda Mládková together with the U.S. ambassador Jack Matlock visited Jiří Sozanský's studio and saved photo documentation of the events Terezín 80 and Most 81-82. The intended exhibition in Michigan was sabotaged by the Artcentrum, (Note: Artcentrum was founded in 1964 as an agency of the then communist Czechoslovakia to promote the sale of works of art abroad.) which refused to export the works created during these events. In 1985, Artcentrum again refused to allow the sale of Sozansky's sculptures and to export them for the group exhibition of Czech artists, Anxiety, which Meda Mládková prepared in United States. Meda Mládková then sent a cash donation to Jiří Sozanský and in 1988 arranged a scholarship from the Pollock-Krasner Foundation. In the 1980s, Jiří Sozanský founded the Box Art association with his colleagues, painter Ivan Komárek and sculptor Vojtěch Adamec Jr.

At the invitation of Jiří Kotalík, he participated in the 1988 Biennale di Venezia together with Ivan Ouhel, where he was given the opportunity to show a representative cross-section of his work in the Czech pavilion. In the same year he received a scholarship from the Pollock-Krasner Foundation. After the Fall of Communism in 1989, he joined a petition to defend the director of the National Gallery Jiří Kotalík and became involved in the Council for the Defence of Culture. In 1990, together with a commission of the Czech National Council, he went to one of the worst prisons of the communist regime in Valdice, known for its cruel abuse of prisoners. He visited Valdice repeatedly, bringing books and founding an art club there. Together with the prisoners, he created a memorial to the victims of totalitarianism in the so-called 3rd ward.

Sozanský's previous experience in Terezín led him to become interested in the fate of the people in besieged Sarajevo, where he travelled repeatedly during the War in Bosnia and Herzegovina and later in 1995–1996 (Urbicida, Zero). In 1995, he received an honorary mention from the Sarajevo Peace Centre and in 2007 a commemorative medal for his long-standing cooperation with Terezín Memorial.

Together with Prof. Jiří T. Kotalík and his wife, PhDr. Olga Sozanská, he founded in 1992 Symposion civic association, which carries out projects that build on his unofficial activities from the 1970s and late 1980s. The Symposion's activities are focused exclusively on non-commercial activities with a broader civilizational reach and include several dozen domestic and international projects. In 1992–1997, he initiated and co-organized, together with Symposion and North Bohemian Gallery of Fine Arts in Litoměřice, the international creative symposia Baroque and Today and Open Dialogue in Church of the Annunciation of the Virgin Mary in Litoměřice. The project Karlín Zone A, which responded to the disastrous flood of 2002, was logically included in the overall context of Jiří Sozanský's work.

Richard Drury characterized Jiří Sozanský's work "as an eternal struggle between defiant humanist values and brutal ideological dogma." The cynical evil of the power machine is explored, exposed, and rendered with drastic expression in his work. The trial of Milada Horáková, who was executed on his own fourth birthday, became a very personal subject for Sozanský. Throughout his work, Sozanský recalls the historical continuity that the communist regime artificially interrupted. The Warsaw Pact invasion of Czechoslovakia and the subsequent normalization deprived his generation of the chance to exist in a natural cultural climate that would not be distorted by ideological manipulations.

Sozansky's work was unacceptable to the communist regime, but as a warning against the dangerous development of human society it remained relevant after 1989. A significant part of his creative thinking is the message contained in Orwell's dystopian novel 1984, whose validity transcends historical epochs and national borders. In 2016, the Minister of Culture awarded him the title Knight of Czech Culture and in 2019 he was certified by the Ministry of Defence as a participant in the resistance and opposition to communism.

He is a member of the Association of Czech Graphic Artists Hollar and in 1991–2010 was a member of the Mánes Union of Fine Arts.

=== Scholarships, awards, grants ===
- 1971 17 November (Day of Struggle for Freedom and Democracy and International Student Day) Prize, Academy of Fine Arts in Prague
- 1988 Pollock-Krasner Foundation grant, New York Scholarship
- 1995 Grant Open Society Fund Prague
- 1995 Honorable Mention International Peace Centre, Sarajevo
- 2007 Medal for long-term cooperation with Terezín Memorial
- 2016 Knight of Czech Culture, Award of the Minister of Culture
- 2019 Certificate of Participation in Resistance and Opposition to Communism
- 2022 Award for outstanding contribution to the reflection of modern history from the Institute for the Study of Totalitarian Regimes
- 2024 Medal of Merit 1st Grade in the arts

== Work ==
Jiří Sozanský is one of those artists whose work immediately resonates with the pulse of the times in which they live. He entered the Czech art scene in the mid-1970s, at the height of normalisation and creative unfreedom. His entire artistic output was committed to opposing all forms of violence, despotism and ideological dictatorship that trampled on human rights and human dignity. He is known as a non-conformist artist and a man of distinct opinions and attitudes, expressing himself through large-scale multimedia projects tied to a specific place. His activities in unusual places and spaces revived the subdued art scene of the 1970s. His actions spoke to the conscience of a "normalising society", even at considerable personal risk. As an eternal theme, he is interested in man in extreme situations, his inner state of mind and external reactions towards the human community. His paintings, drawings, sculptures, objects, installations, environments and performances react to a specific environment and social situation as an urgent warning memento. Such were his events in Terezín, Most, Vysočany or Veletržní palác, which were logically followed by projects realized after 1990 in the Valdice Prison and in the former Jesuit Church in Litoměřice as well as a number of events reflecting the wartime suffering of the inhabitants of Sarajevo, presented in the Czech Republic and in Bosnia and Herzegovina. He is one of the artists who take a responsible role in the concept of art as a personal statement about the world around us. Sozanský repeatedly and urgently raises important and not very popular topic, which in his artistic reflection also mirrors the state and direction of our civilization." (abbreviated quote, see e.g. J. T. Kotalík: from the catalogue of the exhibition "Sutiny - sculptures prints paintings collage" Municipal House, Prague 2009, Amnézie, Municipal House Prague 2019) Sozansky's paintings advocating the victims of mass violence have predecessors in the Horrors of War series by Francisco Goya and Guernica by Pablo Picasso, his sculptures express a deep connection with the existentialism of Alberto Giacometti.

Sozansky's work is characterized by thematic cycles, coherence and continuity of topics, and a multimedia synthetic approach, combining artistic techniques with performance and live actors in a unique scenography. His distinctive artistic signature is charged with dynamic expression and bold color, creating the illusion of a thunderous struggle. The baroque principle of heightened plastic dynamism is generally encoded into his dramatic figure modelling. He compensates for this by the sometimes cold architectural setting of the action or the meditative position of the portraits, and by using fragments of texts that were the inspiration for a particular work.

=== Early work ===
During his training for the exams at the Academy of Fine Arts in Prague, Jiří Sozanský was engaged in drawing and painting portraits, and while working for the Geological survey he painted landscapes. Already during his studies and then until 1979 he devoted himself to graphic art. In 1968–1973 he created a series of prints with biblical themes, drawings and paintings from the surrounding of the Kladno steelworks and the Most region. During his visits to the basement apartment of Mr. Švacha, who was a model in the sculpture studio of the Academy of Fine Arts, the series of graphic prints Job and Basement were created. Sozanský depicts socially compelling and relevant content, seen against the broader context of human existence. The human being is depicted naked, alone and without props, as close to pathos as to the misery of humanity. Sozansky's reflection on old age, suffering, loneliness and pain is a timely parallel to the story of the Old Testament Book of Job. In 1971, he won the 17 November Prize for his series of paintings From the Life of a Blind Man. His graduation work on the theme of human suffering was based on the diary of Albert Speer.

From 1970 he modelled sculptures in the studio of Olbram Zoubek. The model for the sculpture with a deeply humanistic message Silent Lament was Mr. Švacha. A series of frottage paintings were made from the sculpture, and the entire Basement series became the basis for scenographic models depicting a man in extreme situation. He concluded his travels to the Theresienstadt Ghetto, which he undertook from 1973, with his first solo exhibition of paintings, drawings and sculptures in 1976. From 1975 came the series of large-scale tempera drawings Prophets and ink drawings of the series Old Men. Sozansky's sculptures Memento and Silent Lament became part of the collection of the Terezín Memorial.

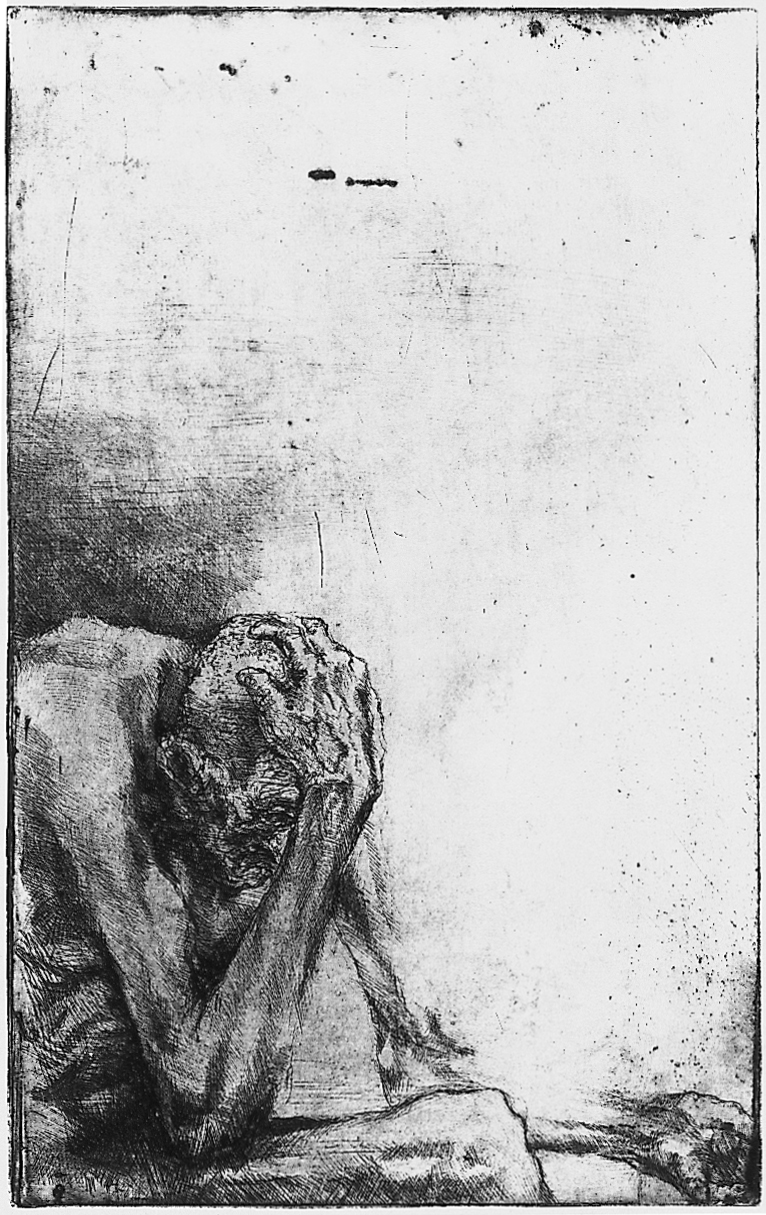
From the cycle Job (1972)

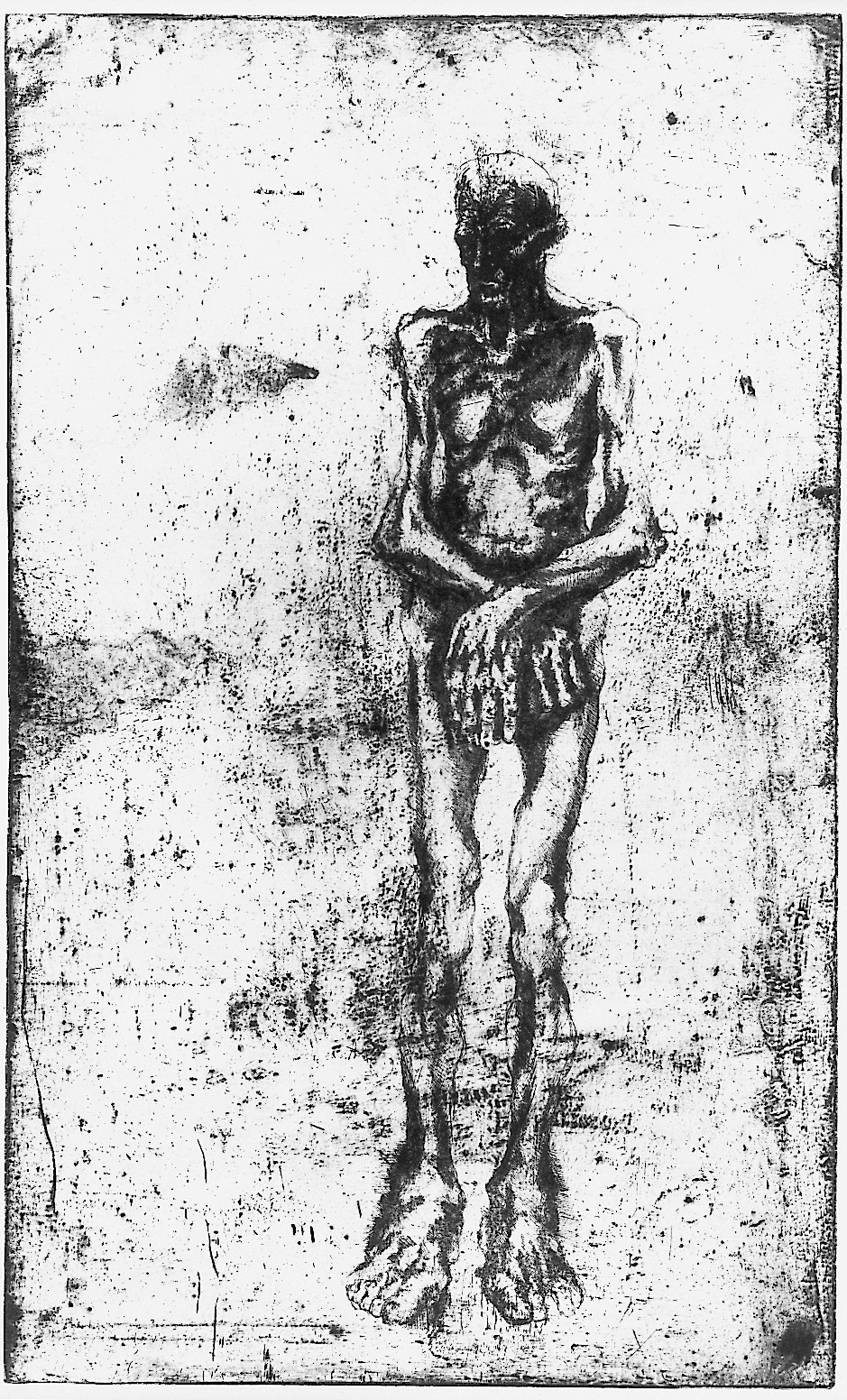
From the cycle Job (1972)

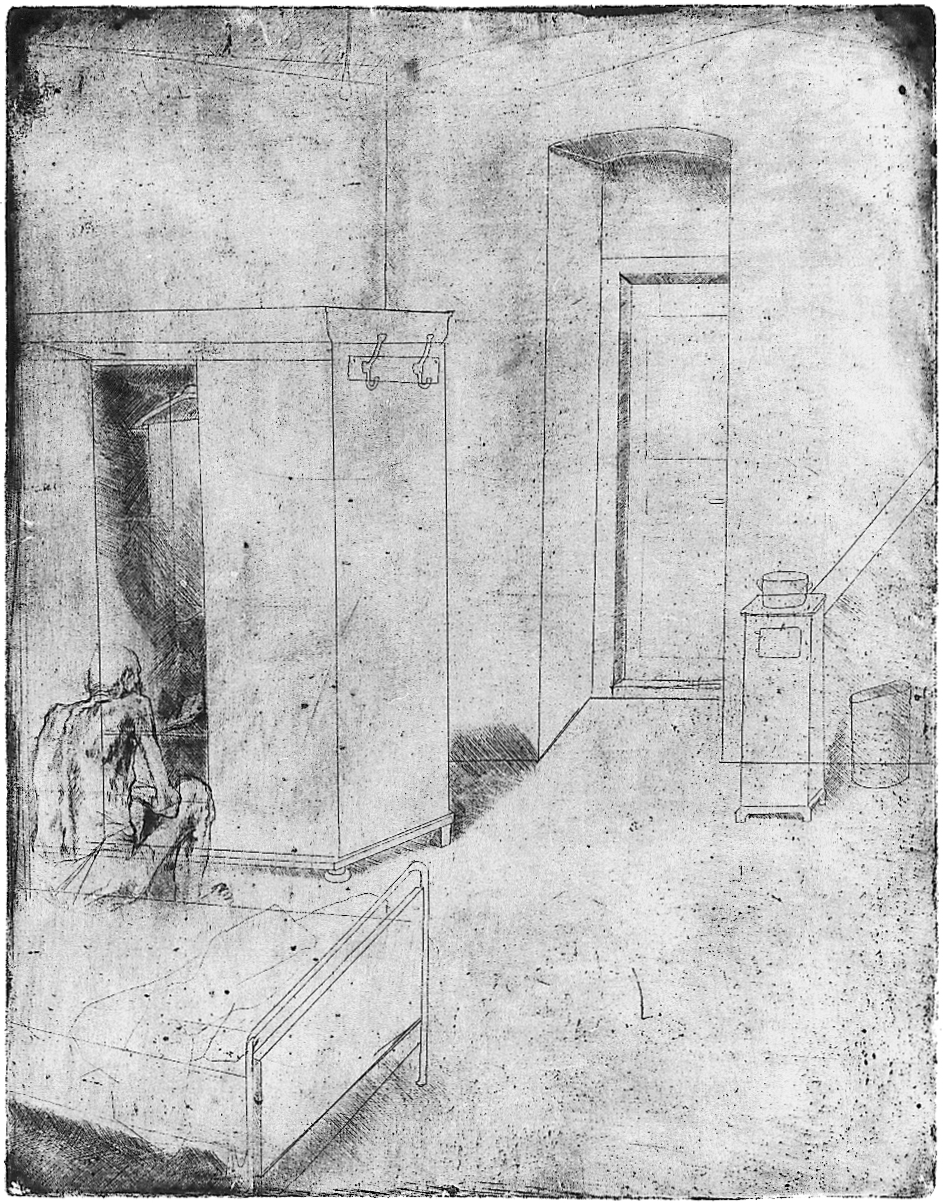
From the cycle Basement (1978)

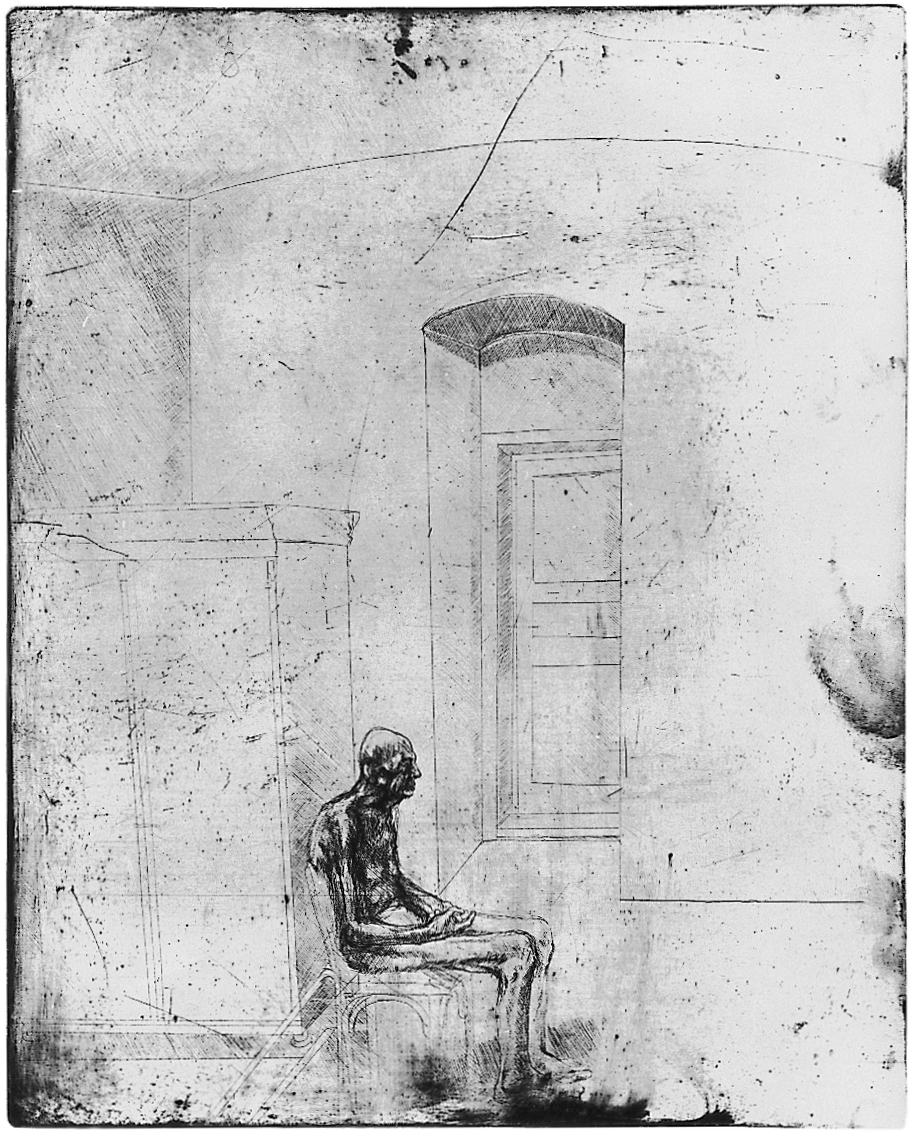
From the cycle Basement (1978)

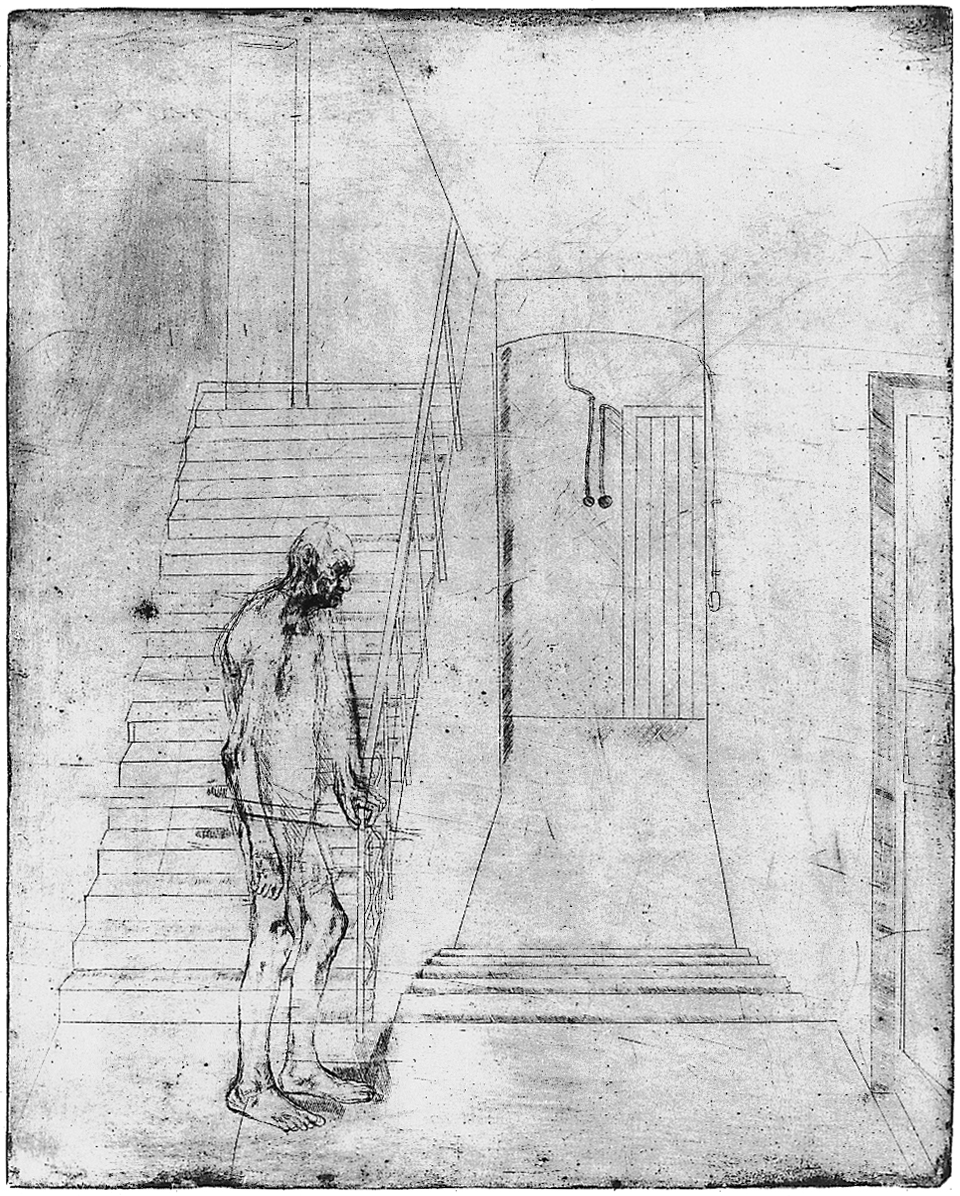
From the cycle Basement (1978)

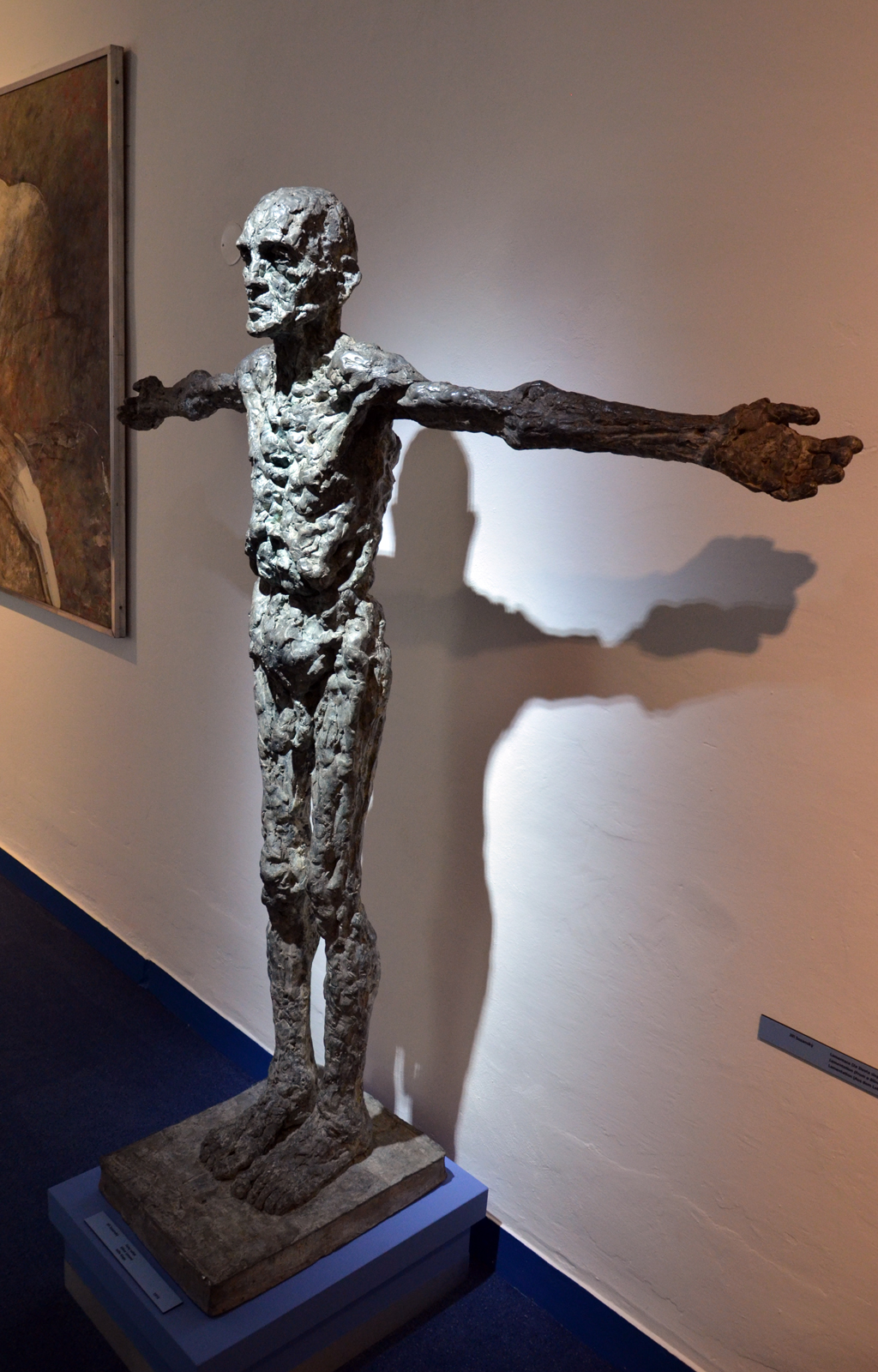
Silent Lament (1973), Terezín Memorial

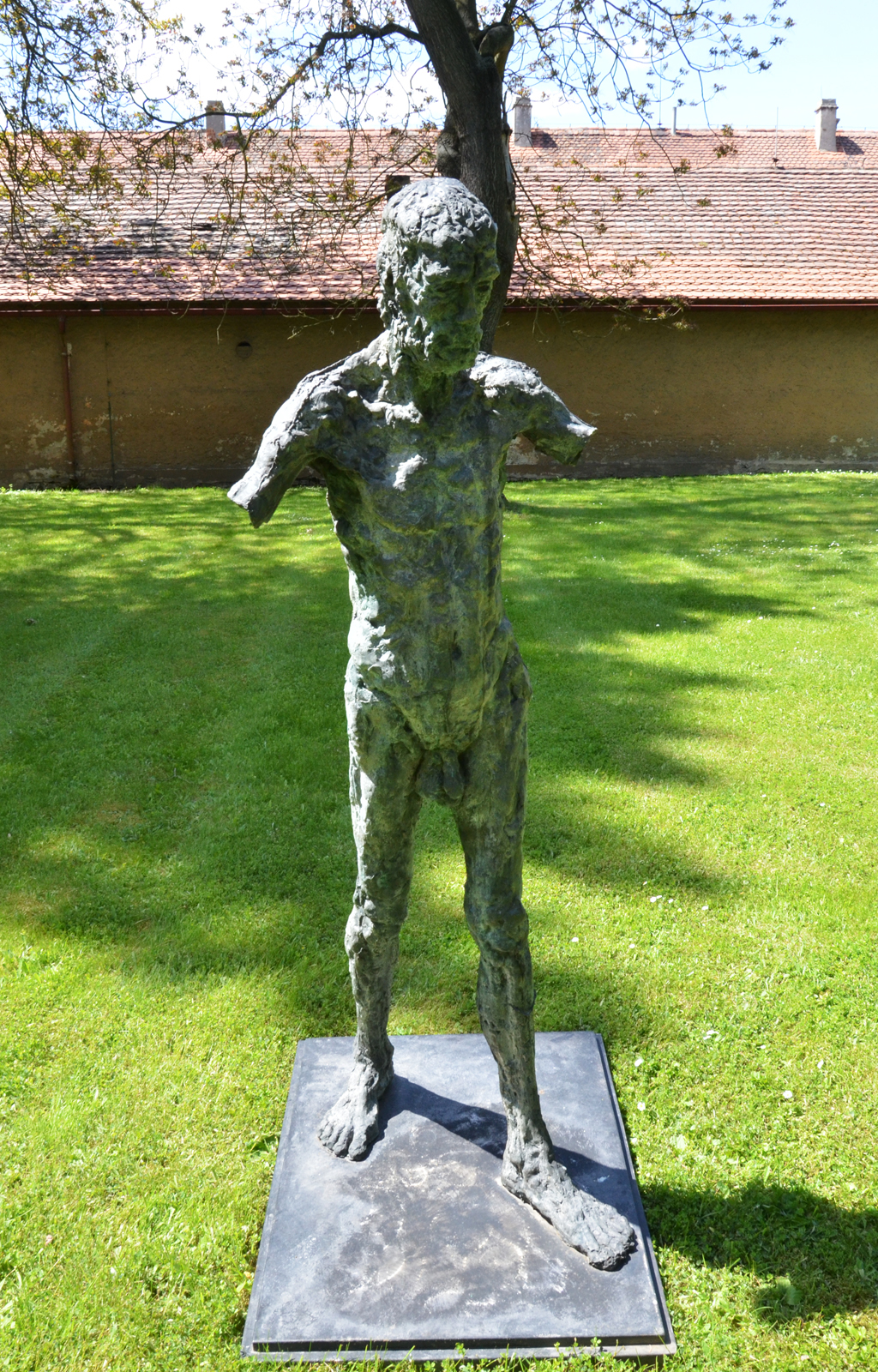
Martyr (1970s), Terezín Memorial

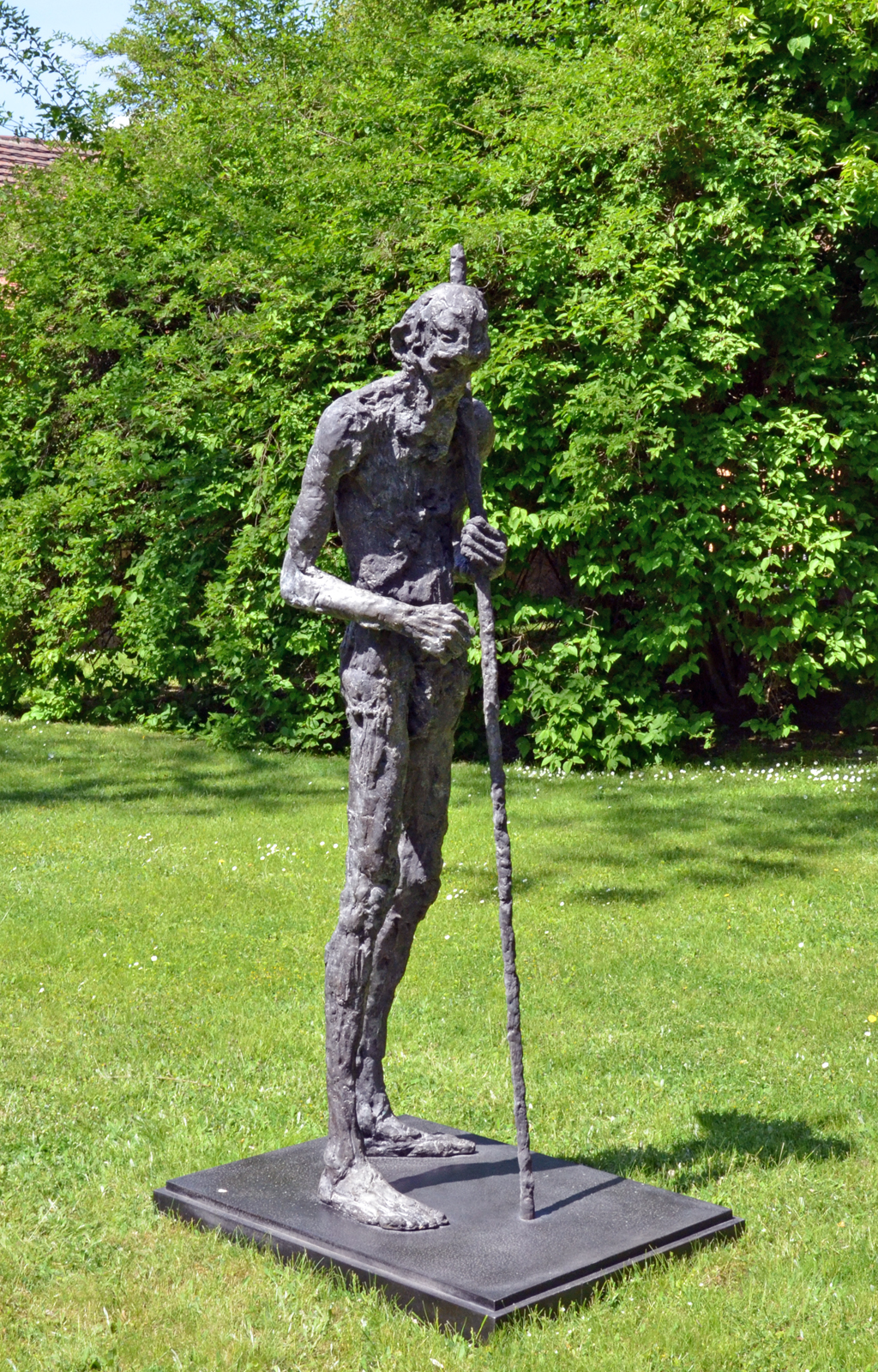
Pilgrim (1970s), Terezín Memorial

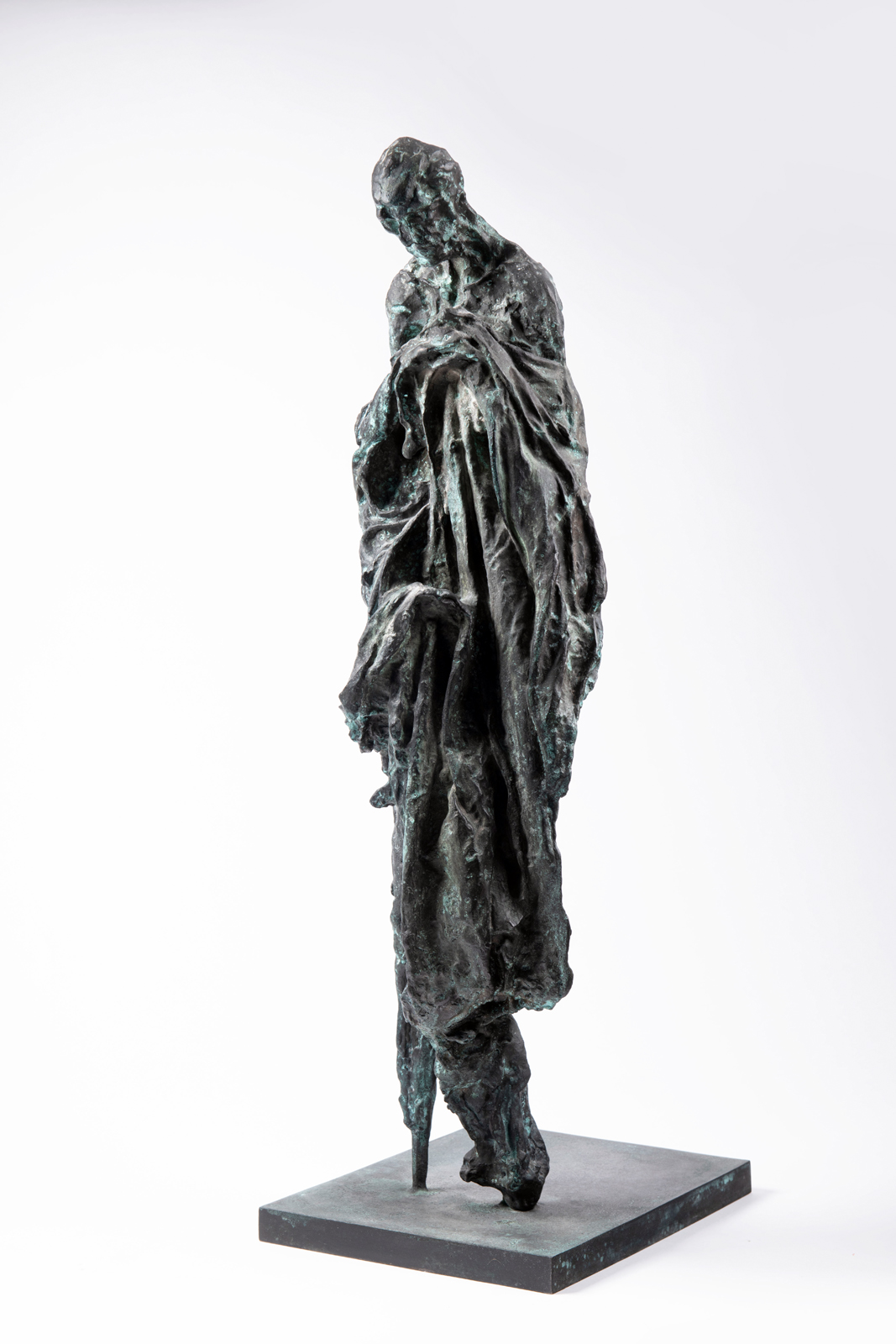
Pilgrim (1970s)

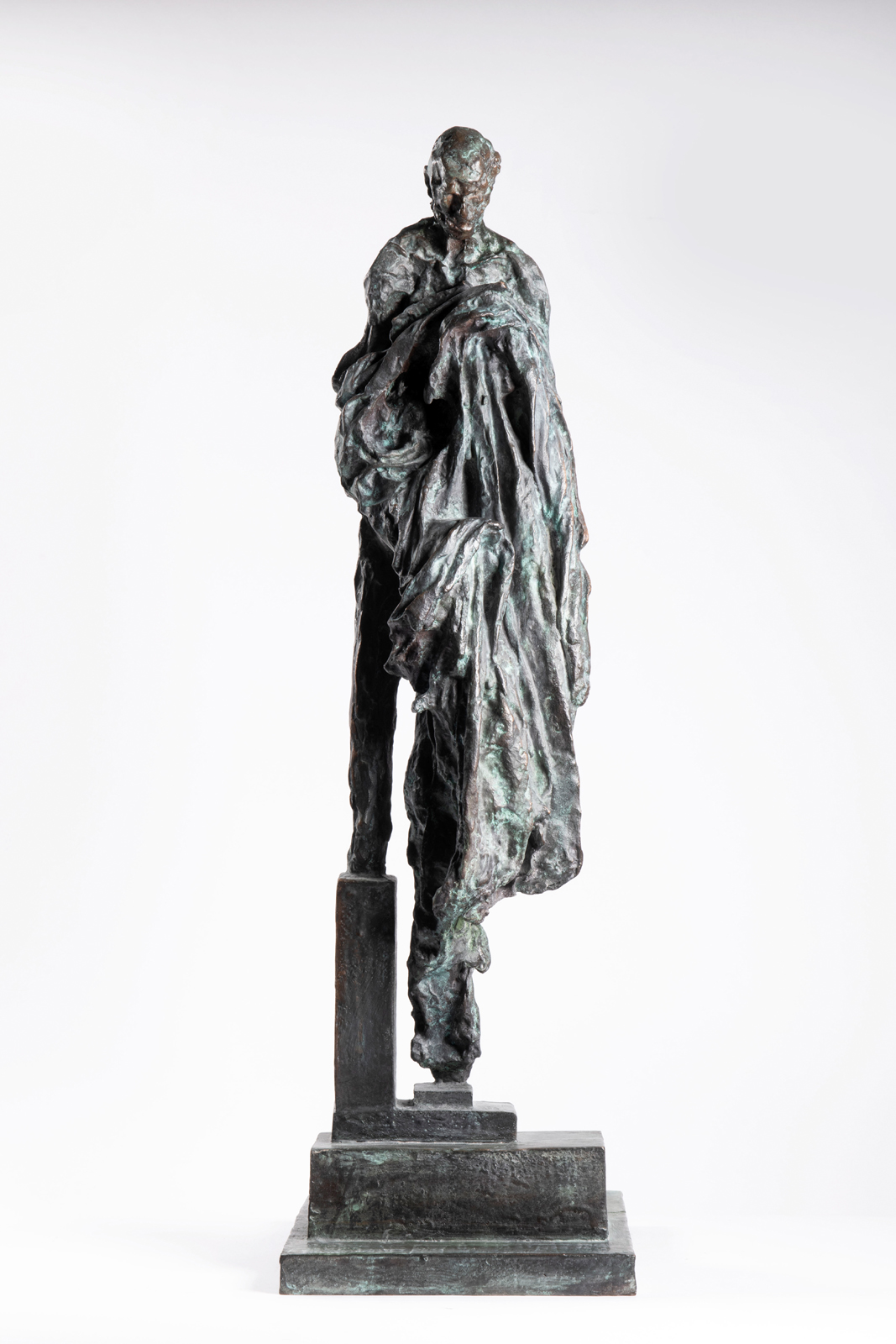
Pilgrim (1970s)

In 1977, he began working with space and created his first environments together with Ivan Bukovský in the courtyard of Small Fortress. For his artistic metaphors of human figures in extreme situations, he used a construction of wire mesh and plaster. In the series Basement (1979), the human figure gets lost in the maze of a house and recalls the trauma of the normalisation era, which Marie Langrová described as wandering from wall to wall. In 1979–1980, drawings of the series Organism of the City and in 2006–2010, reconstructed models of extreme situations were created, where small human figures serve as the scale of sculptural architectures (Models of Extreme Situations, 1979–2006, Skeletons, 1984–2009, Homage to Jan Palach, 2008, Mater Mortis, 2010)

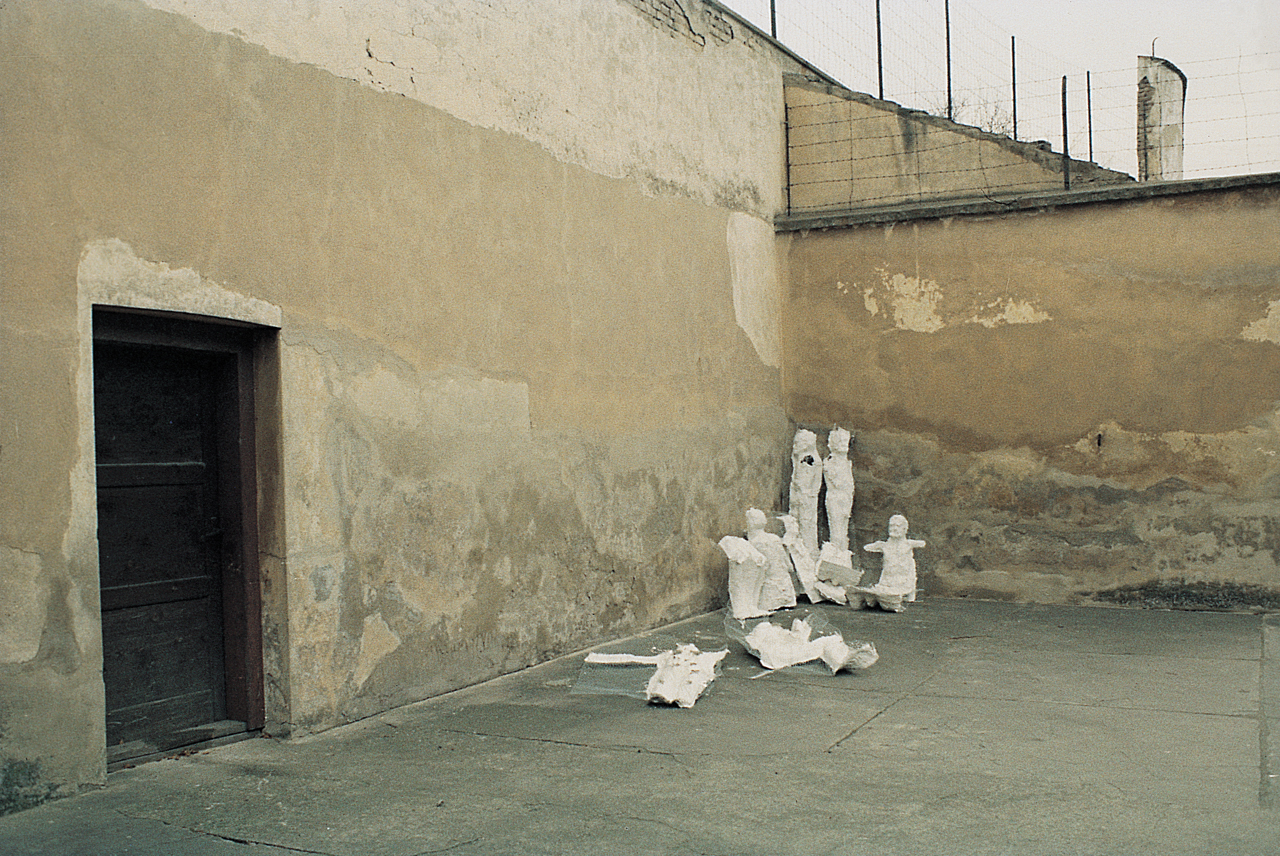
Small Fortress, 1978

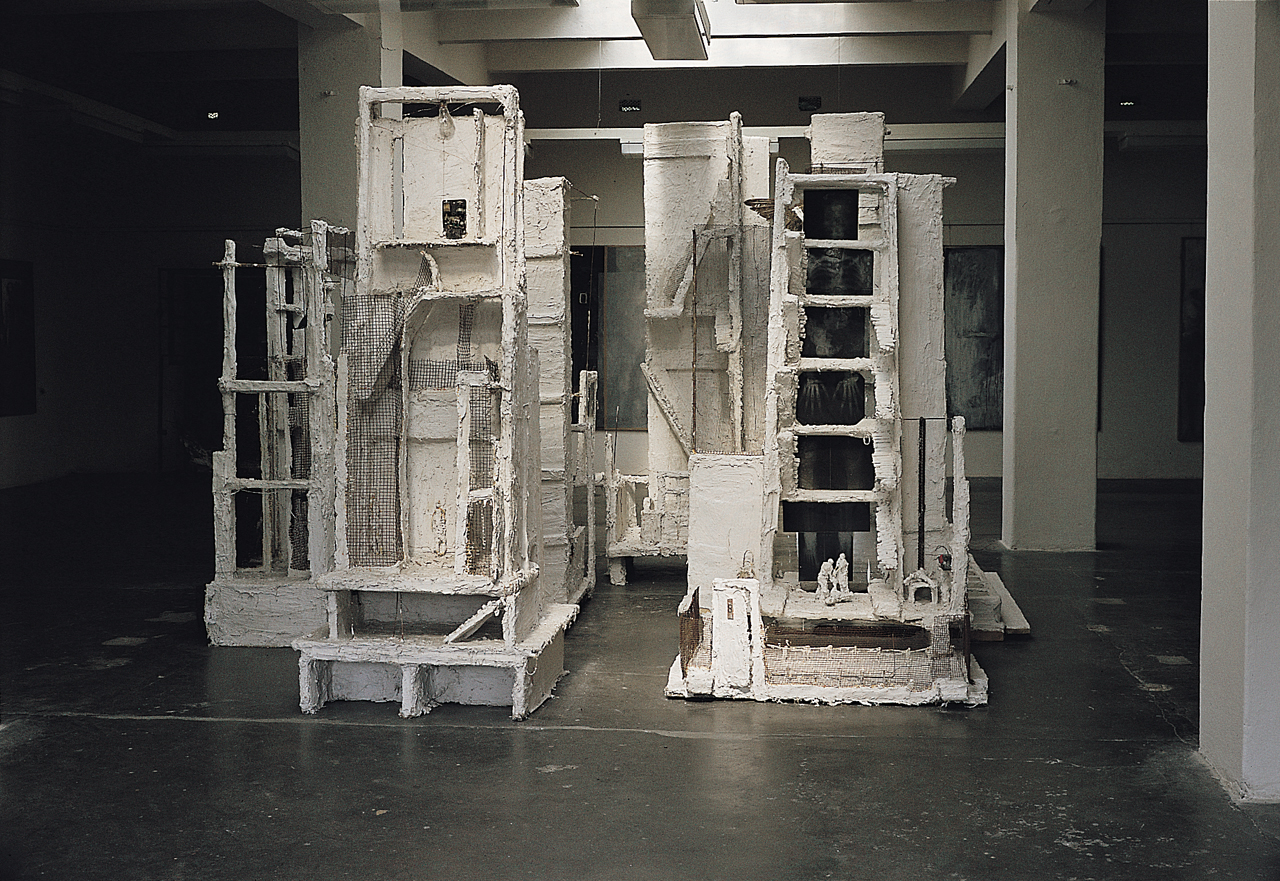
Models of extreme situations, Small Fortress (1979–1980)

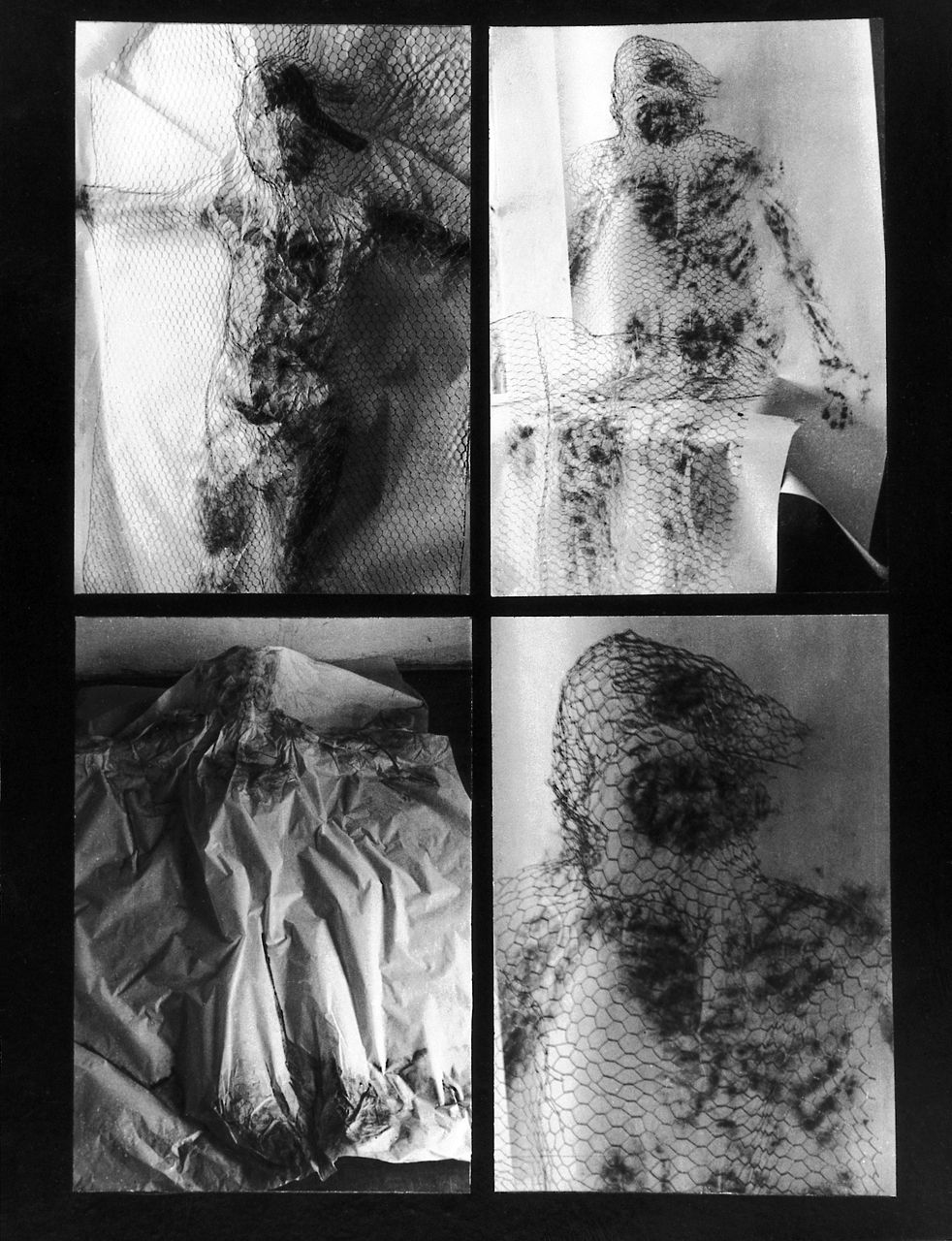
Kammer, Small Fortress 1980

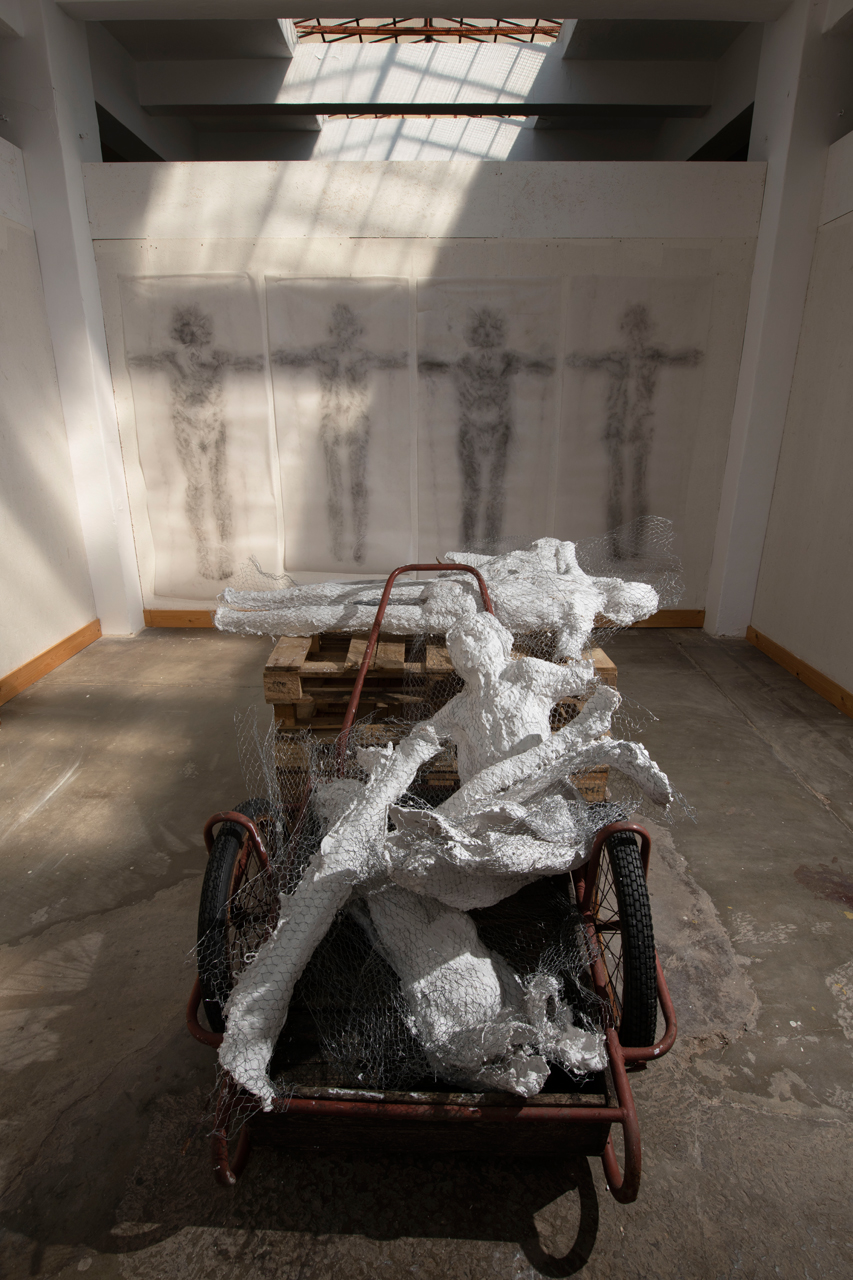
Small Fortress (2021)

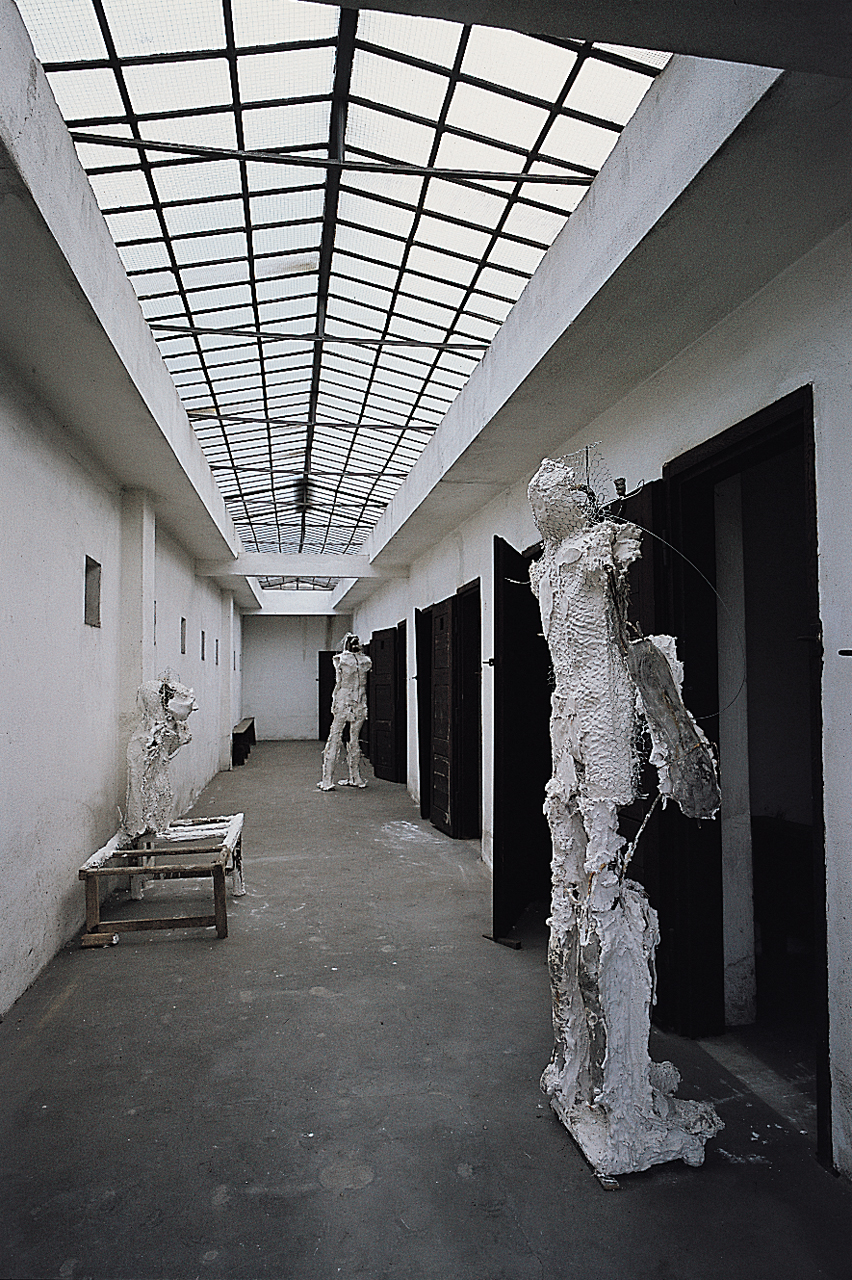
Small Fortress (2021)

=== 1980–1985 ===
Sozansky's activities in Small Fortress culminated in 1980 with a private symposium, which was attended by Zdeněk Beran, Ivan Bukovský, Oldřich Kulhánek, Lubomír Janečka, Petr Kovář and Ivan Dolejšek. The works created inside the Small Fortress were exhibited directly in the prison cells and in the corridor of the solitary confinement cells in the IV. yard. The cultural inspector of the town tried to prevent the exhibition by summoning police with dogs, by denouncing the exhibition to Ministry of Culture and to the Central Committee of the Communist Party of Czechoslovakia, and informing the StB, which began investigating the participants. The exhibition was banned shortly afterwards when officials realized that it was not just a commemoration of the Holocaust, but an obvious reminder of the fascist practices of the new totalitarianism. In 1979–1980, he created a series of drawings, Project IV. Yard, which confront the silhouettes of human figures with the cold geometry of space. A partial reinstallation of the sculptures, which had been left in a former potato warehouse during the normalization, took place in 1991. For the reconstruction, Sozanský invited young actors, who performed during the opening and later repeated staging completely naked just for photo documentation.

From 1980 onwards, his drawing series Days and Years of My Mother was created, where he set the portraits in an impersonal architecture suggested only by lines. The series was created continuously and ended with his mother's death in 1989. From 1981 he worked in Most on the series The Trial and Anatomy of an Industrial Landscape and in 1982 he created drawings and installations on the theme of Escape together with Jiří Novák. Architect Jiří Borl, who draw plans and perspectives, was a co-author of the resulting large-scale drawings. In the early 1980s, Sozanský participated in the exhibition Malostranské dvorky (Small Town yards) (1981) and took part in several generational exhibitions in regional or unofficial galleries (Karlovy Vary, Hodonín, Písek, Liberec), which broke the existing ideological monopoly of the official Union of Czechoslovak Visual Artists. At that time, he used photography, painting and metal cages, which delimited the space for the figure (Sculptures and Objects, 1980–1984, Family Portrait, 1982–1985). Sozansky's cages with figures, which are a combination of assemblage and plaster limbs, most of all resemble variants of the torture instrument from Kafka's short story In the Penal Colony.

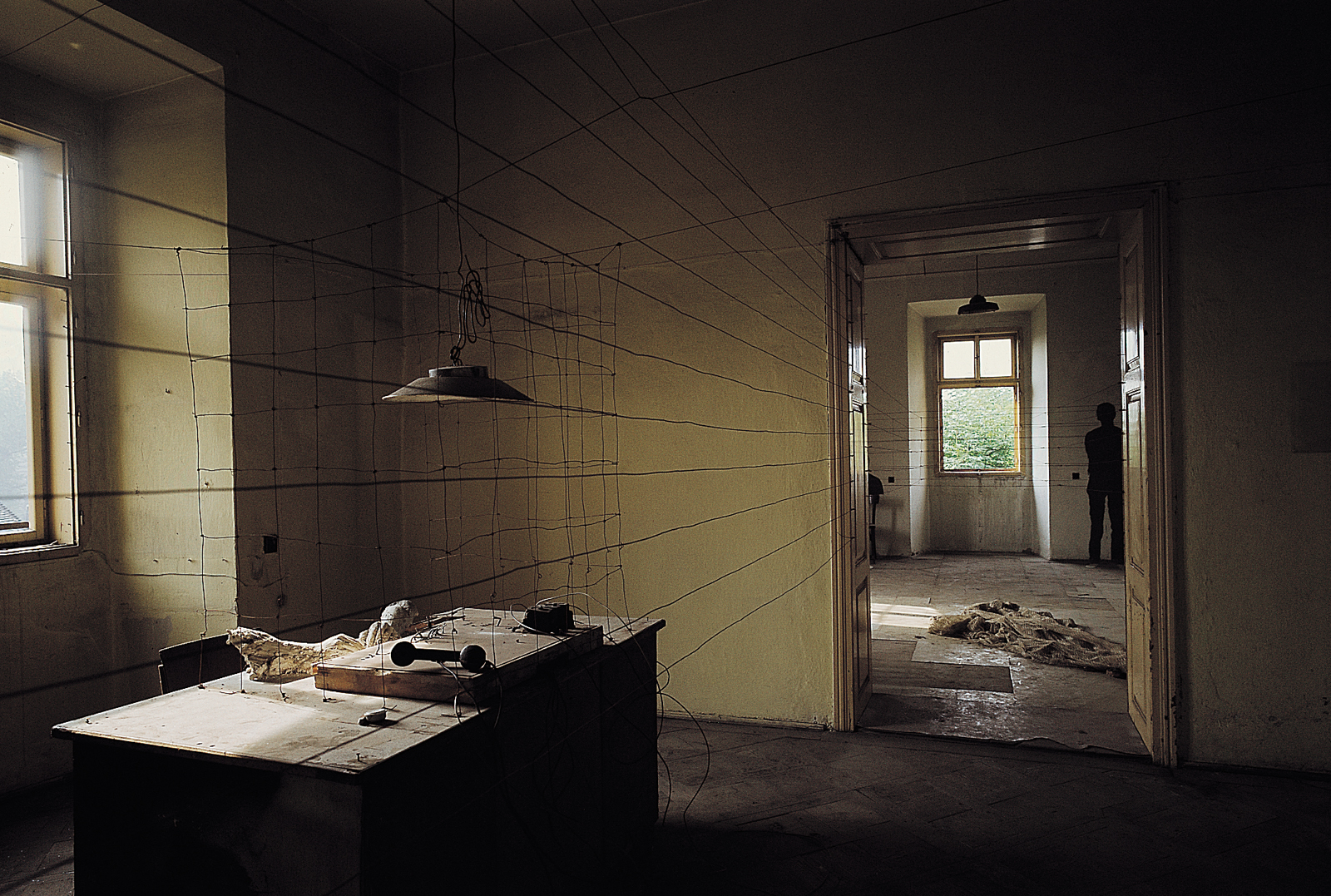
The Trial (Most 1981)

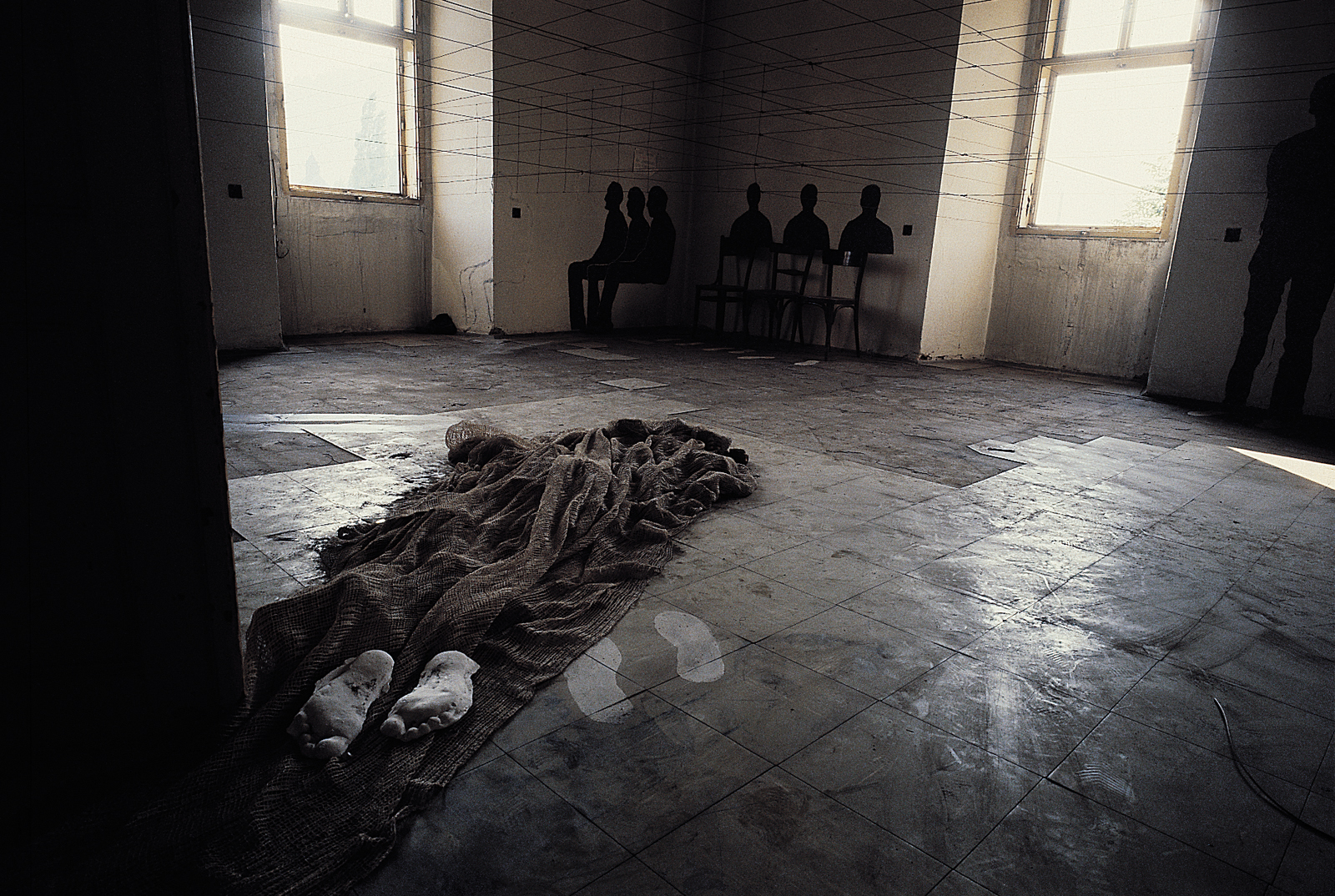
The Trial (Most 1981)

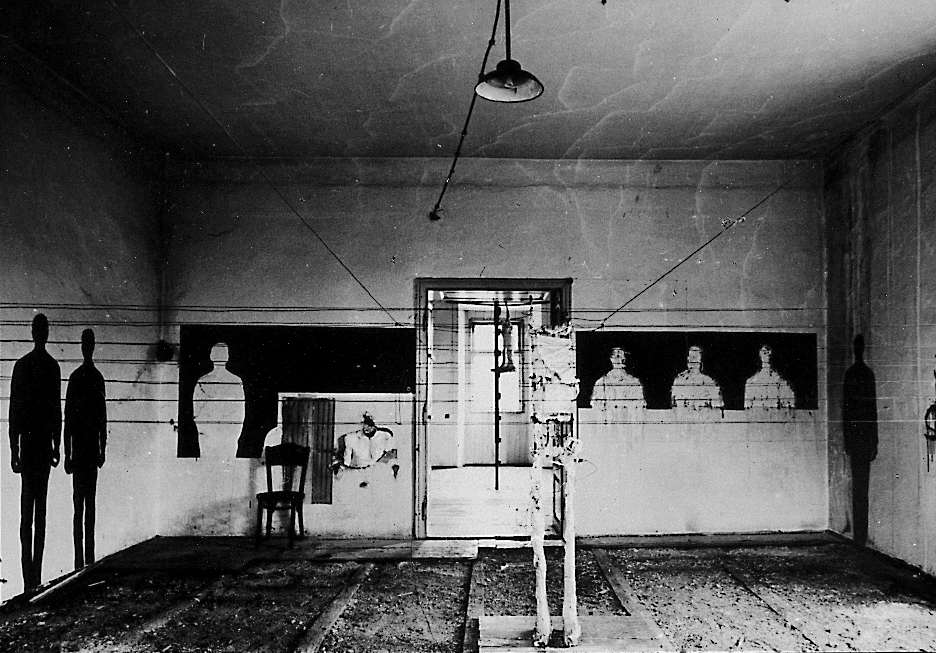
The Trial (Most 1981)

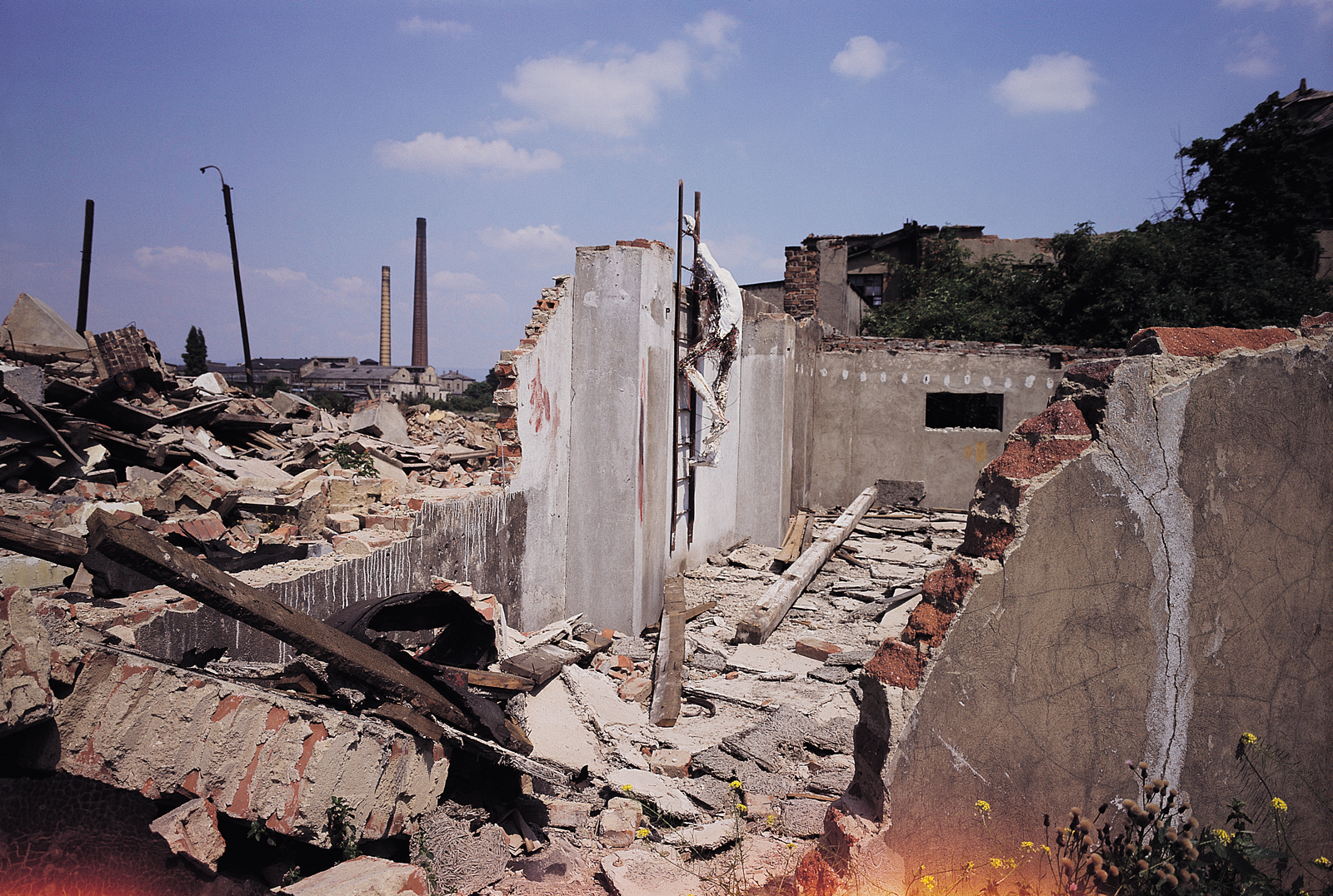
Escape (Most 1982)

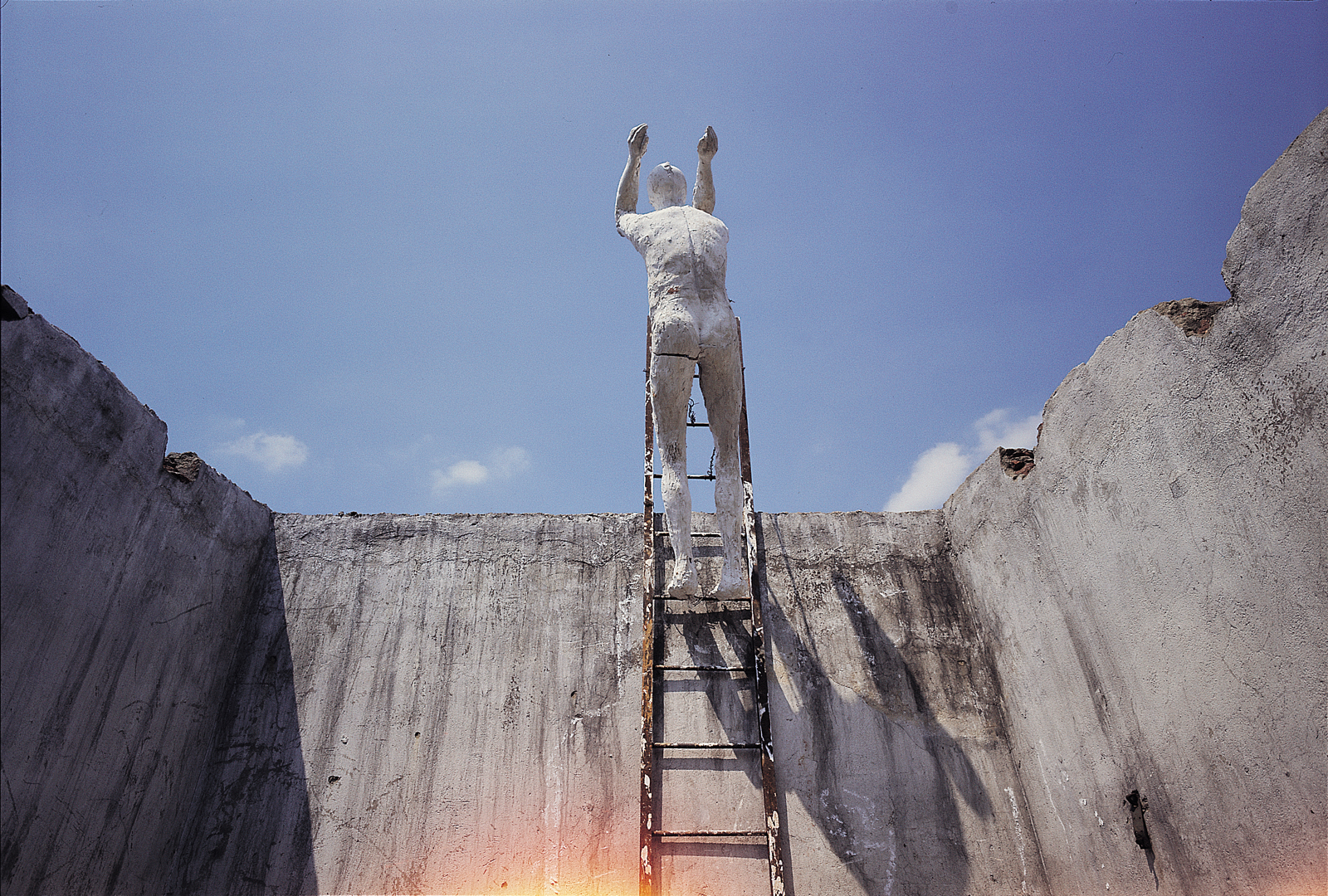
Escape (Most 1982)

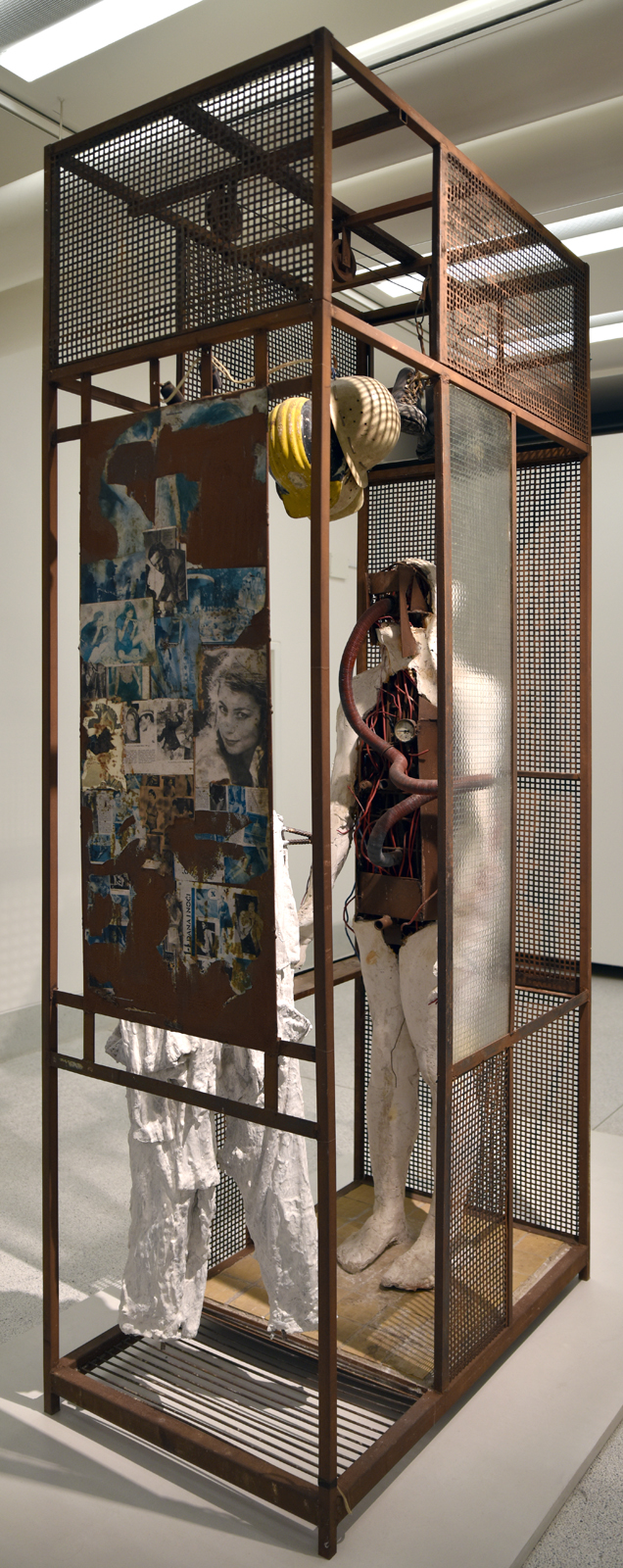
Miners' changing room (1982–1983)

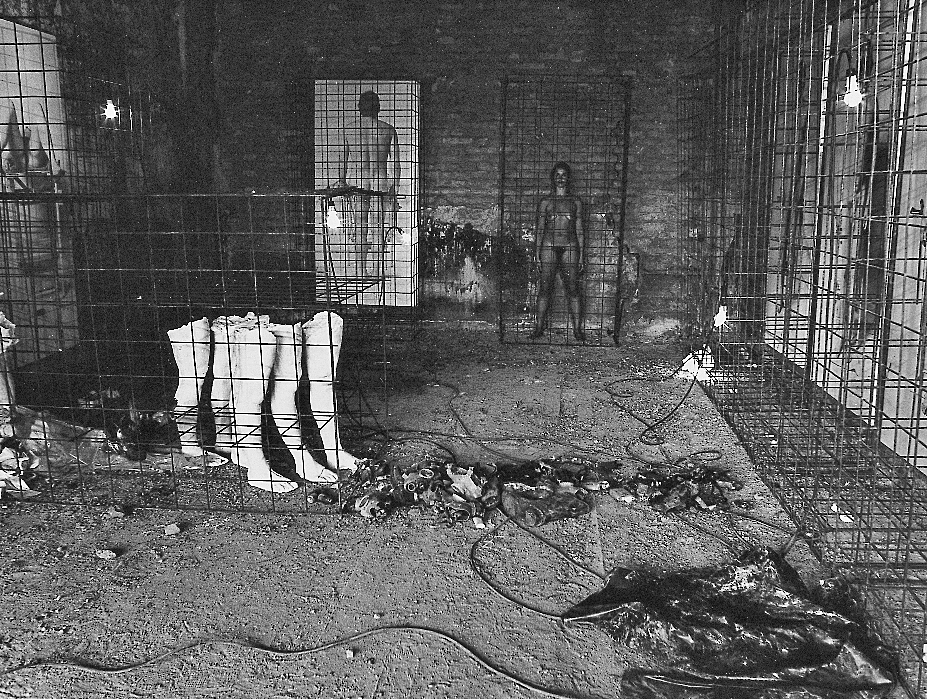
action Survive (1984)

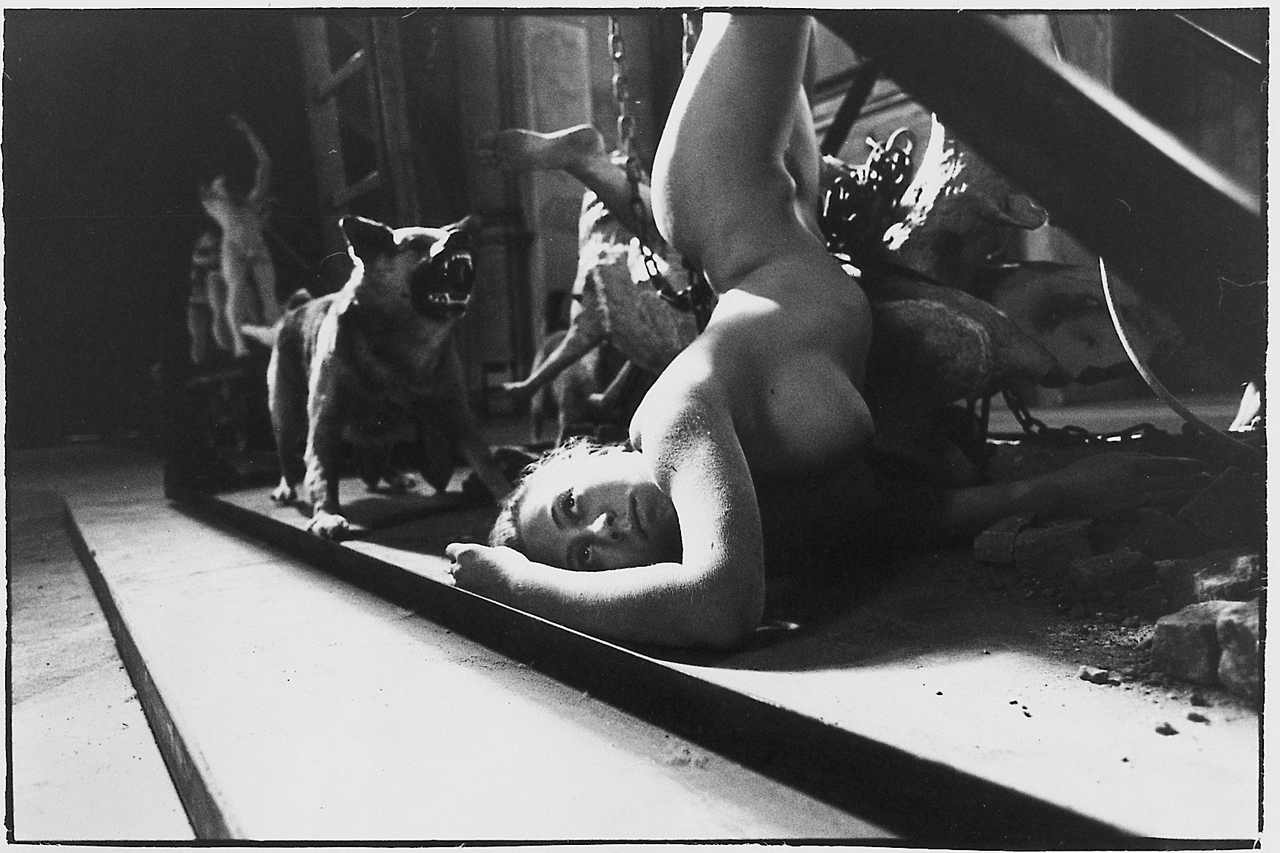
Sacrifice (performance 1992)

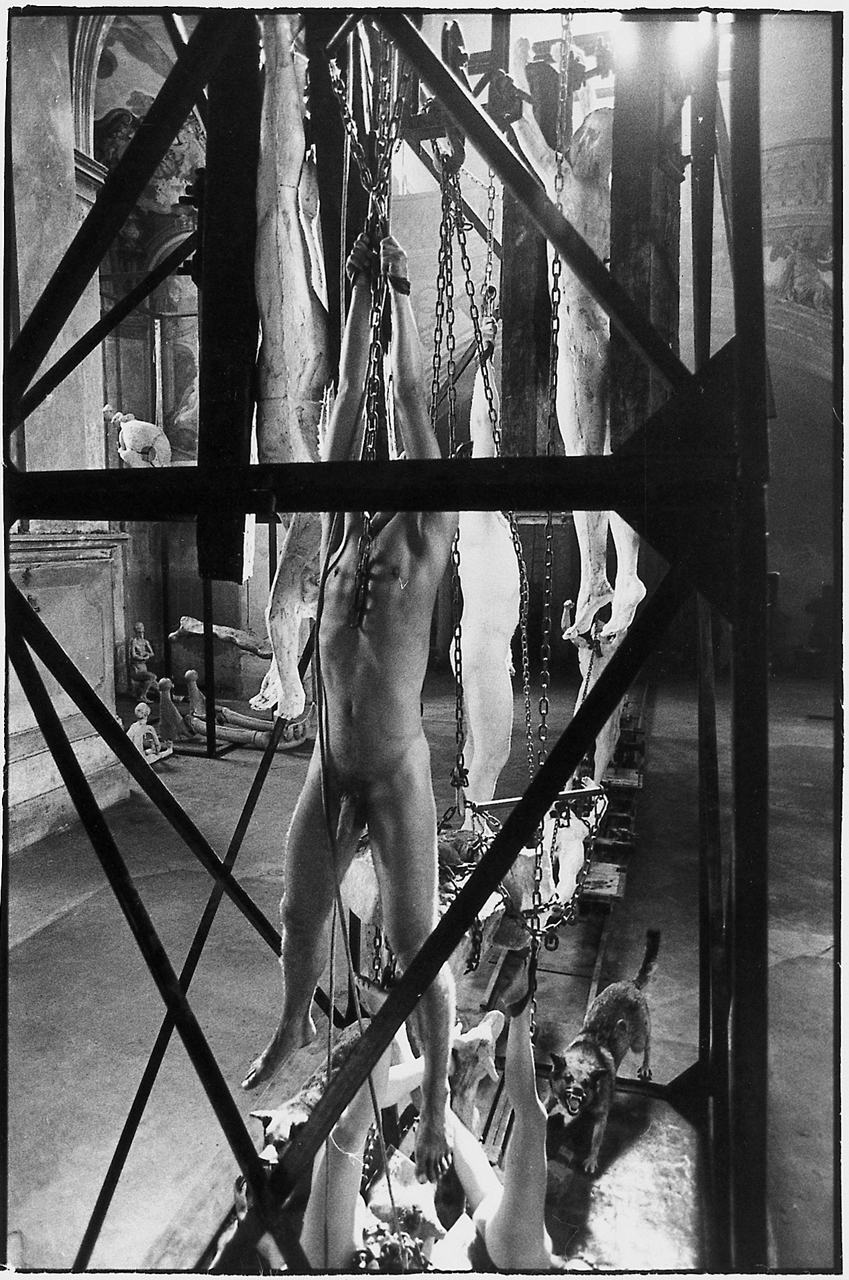
Sacrifice (performance 1992)

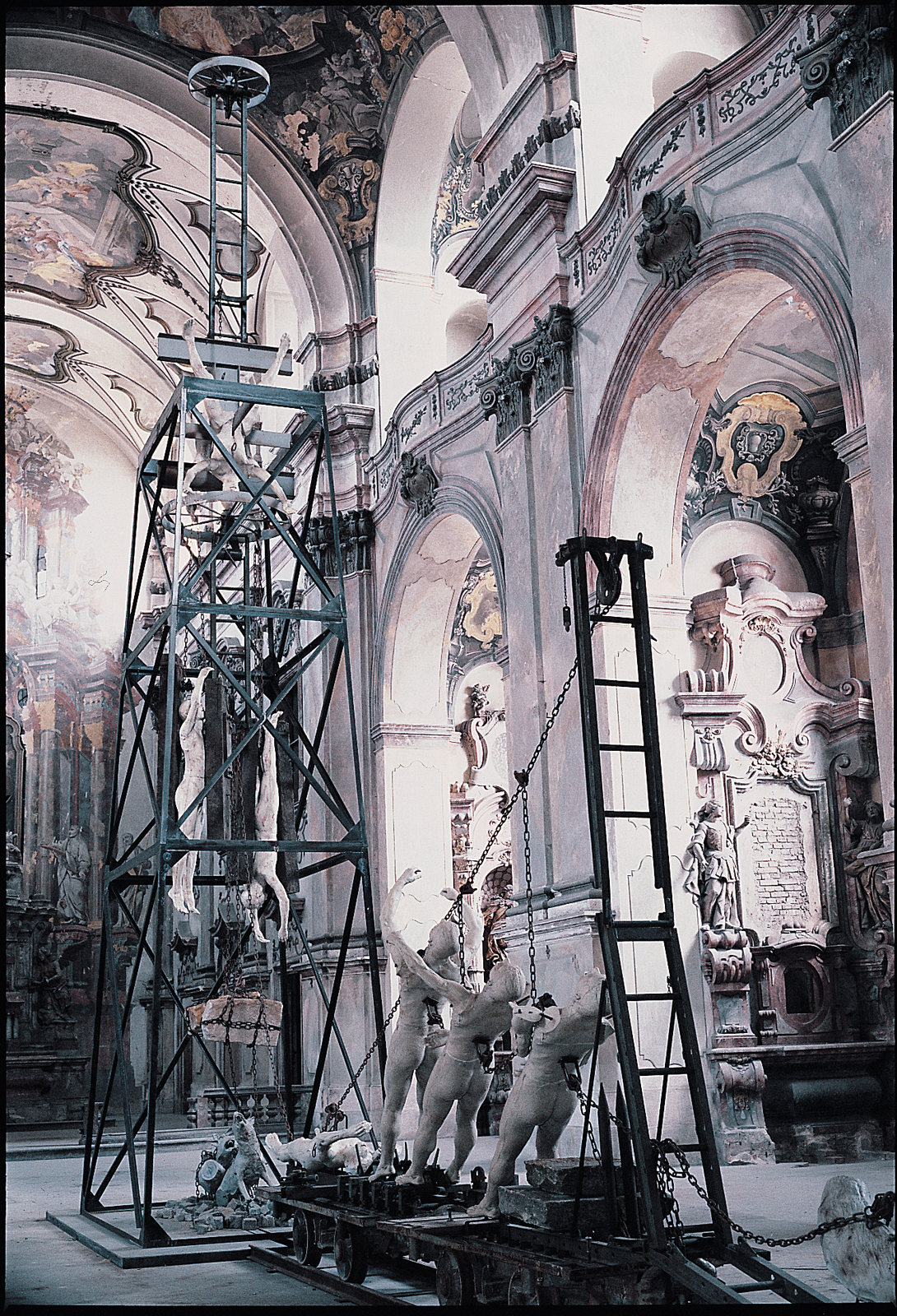
Sacrifice (exhibition Baroque and today, 1992)

At the turn of 1983–1984, reading a samizdat edition of Orwell´s novel 1984, inspired him to start a project in the setting of the interior of the burnt-out Trade Fair Palace. Thanks to arch. Miroslav Masák and the company SIAL, which reconstructed the building for the purposes of the National Gallery, he was able to realize his plans there for several months. The project included live performances, photographs, paintings, reinforcing iron cages and sculptural objects (the events Survive, There and Back, Massacre, Human Couple). Thanks to the collaboration of Evald Schorm, the cameraman Jaroslav Kučera and editor Jiří Brožek, as well as several Laterna magika actors participated in the film. Everything took place under conspirative conditions, and Sozanský eventually stopped the entire project so as not to endanger the others involved. The results of the art project were exhibited as late as 2014 under the title 1984 - The Year of Orwell at the Trade Fair Palace.

==== House No. 50 ====
In 1987, "House No. 50" was a continuation of the previous projects. In an abandoned Vysočany house slated for demolition, Sozanský created a large-scale environment with life-size photographs and paintings of human nudes in dramatic situations and embedded metal and wooden structures. In collaboration with J. Borl, he created spatial installations: Individual Catering, Family Psychotherapy, Convalescents, Bedroom, Attributes of Love, Mirror of Solitude, Visitors, Incident, Big Laundry. The distinctive pathos and expressive, almost baroque overflow created a suitable setting for the subsequent performance by the French actor Dominique Collignon-Maurin on the theme Man Job, which is captured on video.

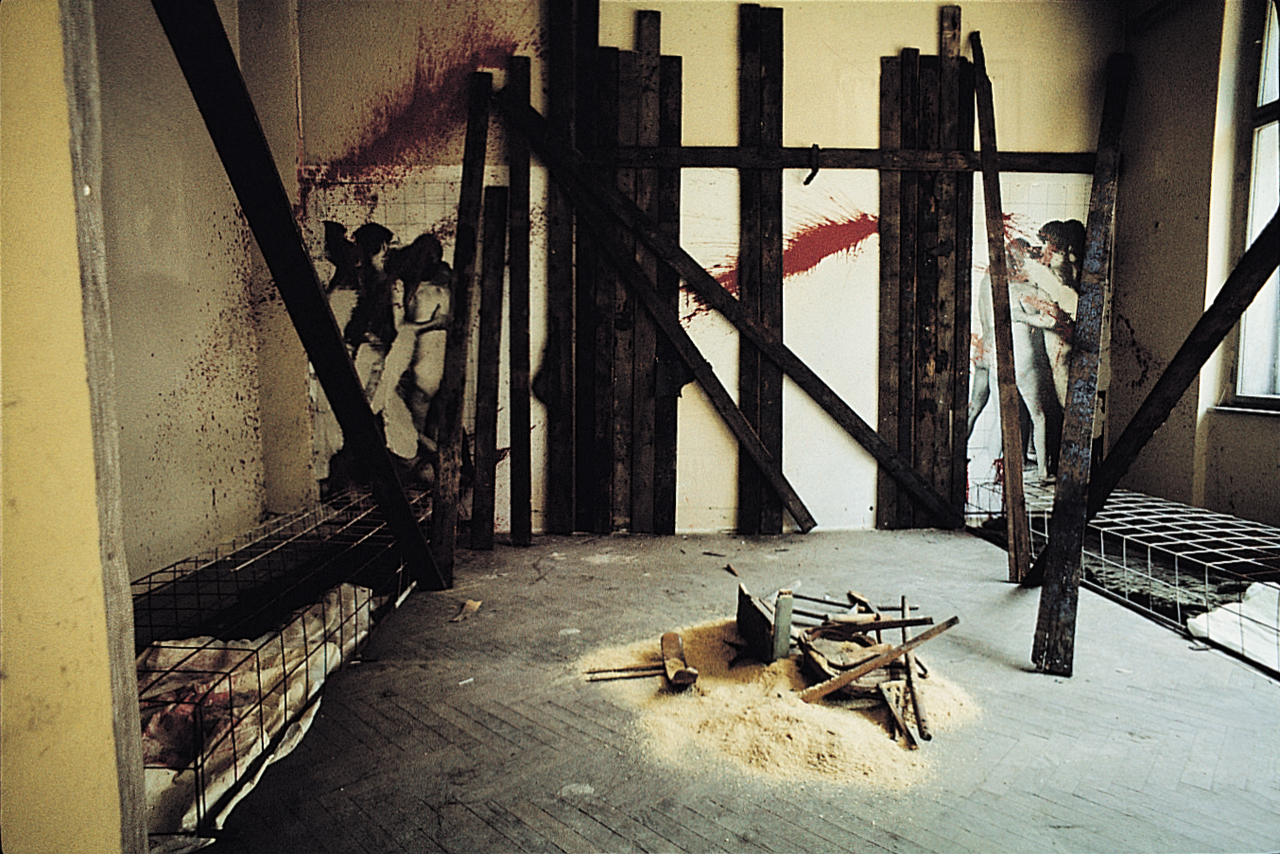
House No. 50, Incident (1987)

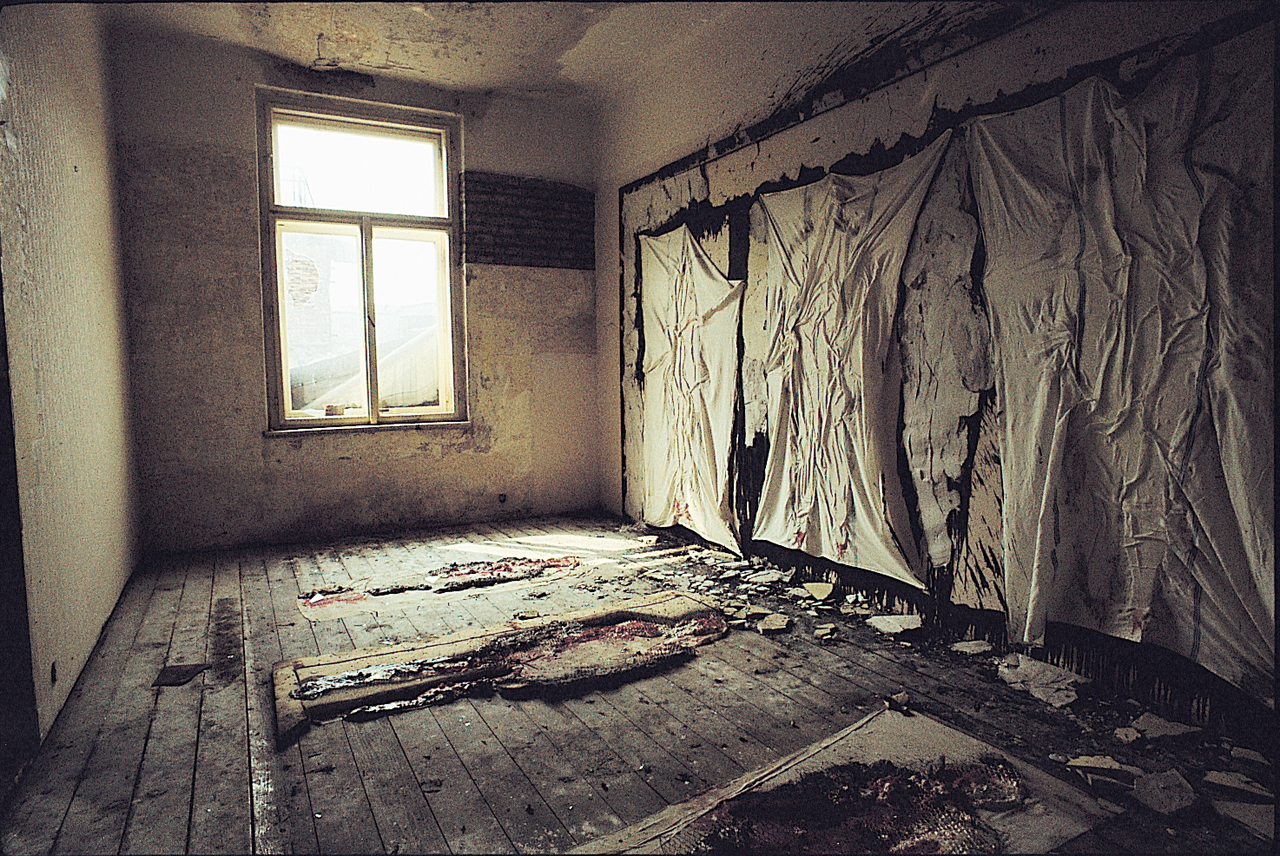
House No. 50, Bedroom (1987)

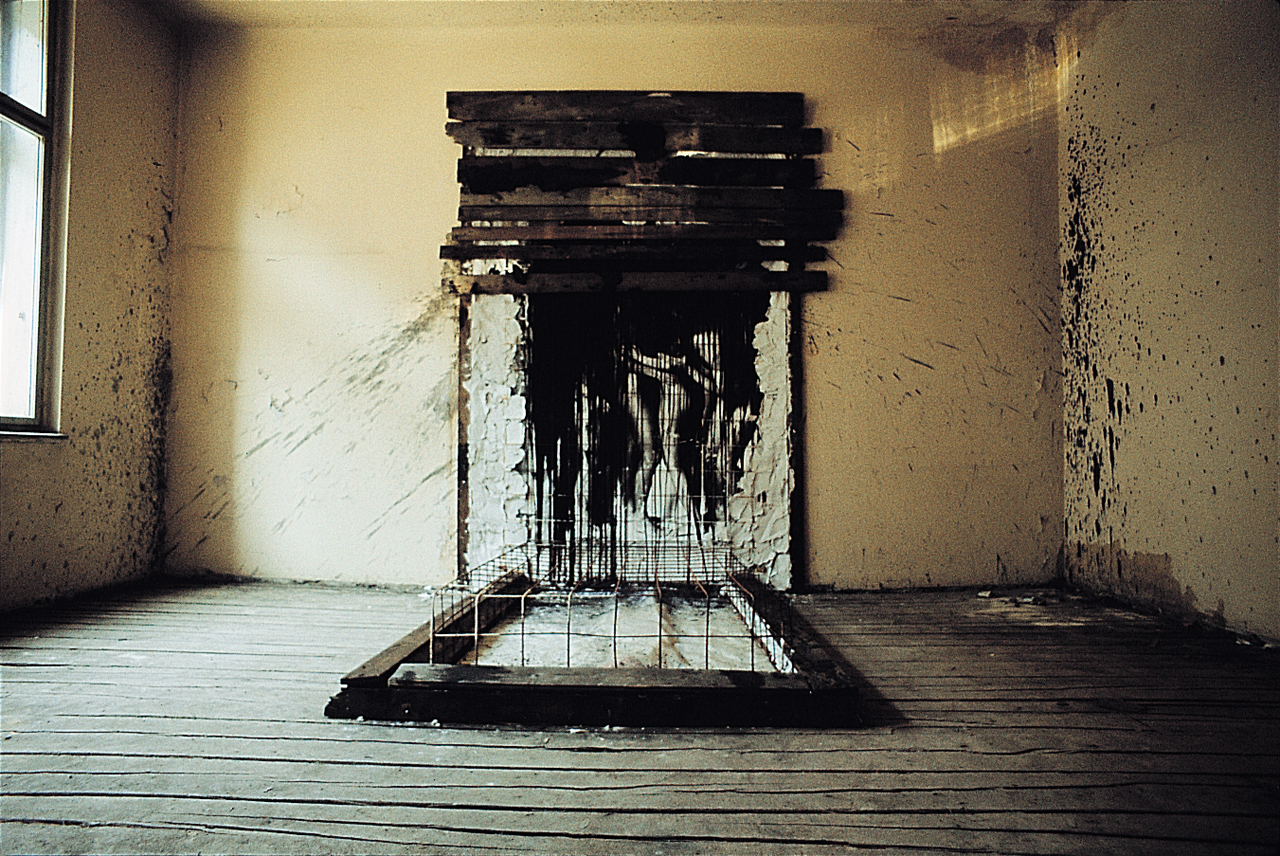
House No. 50, Visit (1987)

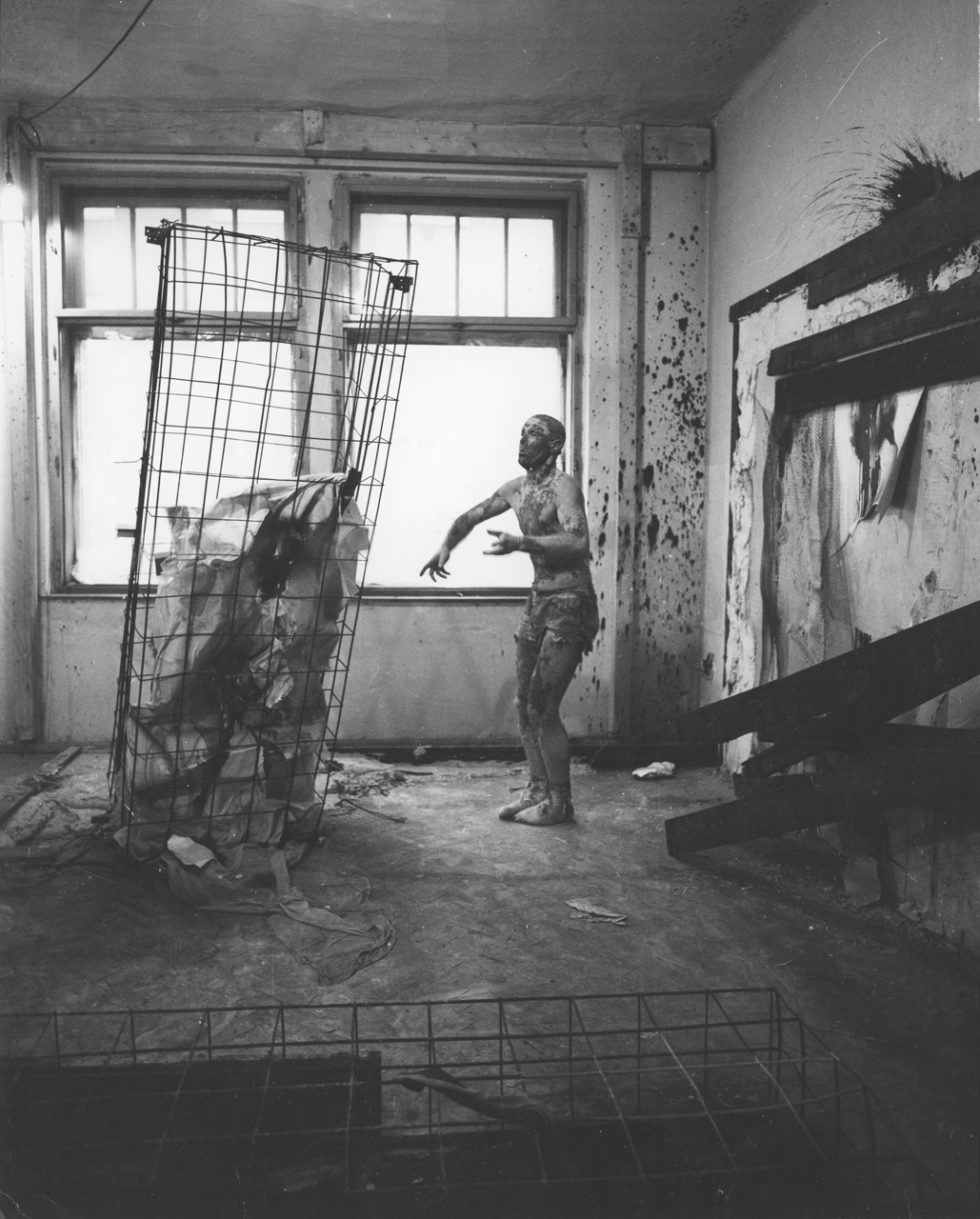
House No. 50, performance of D. Collignon-Maurin, Man Job (1987)

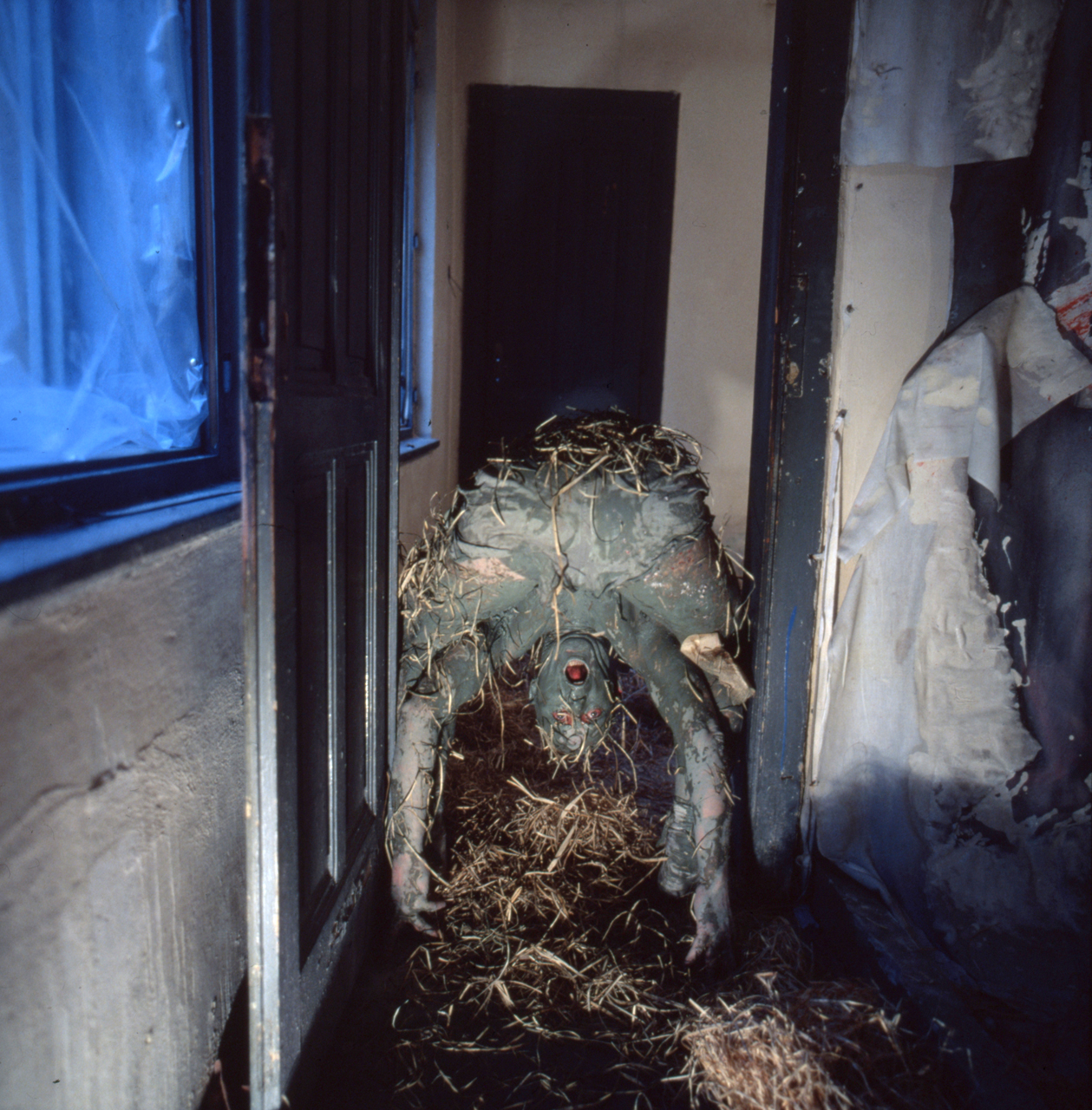
House No. 50, performance of D. Collignon-Maurin, Man Job (1987)

=== 1988–1990 ===
In the late 1980s, Sozanský returned to painting with the cycles Battlefield (1988–1989) and The Fall (1989–1991), in which he combined large-scale oil painting with assemblage. The Battlefield series follows House No. 50 and depicts naked human bodies that gradually disappear under broad strokes of black paint, evoking the merging of bodies with the earth. The Fall cycle has its antecedent in a sculpture that Sozanský placed in 1982 in the chancel of a church in Most that was slated for demolition. It does not refer to any specific event, but represents some inexplicable tragedy or fate. Sozanský uses both cycles to renew and evaluate his relationship to the Baroque.

In 1988, Sozanský exhibited his large-scale paintings of groups of naked human bodies in dramatic situations jointly with plaster objects by Hugo Demartini at the Lidový dům (People's House) in Vysočany. In the same year, he participated in the unofficial show of previously banned artists Forum 88 in the Prague Marketplace (environment Closed, Sozanský organized the event together with Theodor Pištěk). In 1988 he also exhibited in the National Pavilion at the Venice Biennale and in 1989 at the Spring Salon in Paris at the Grand Palais.

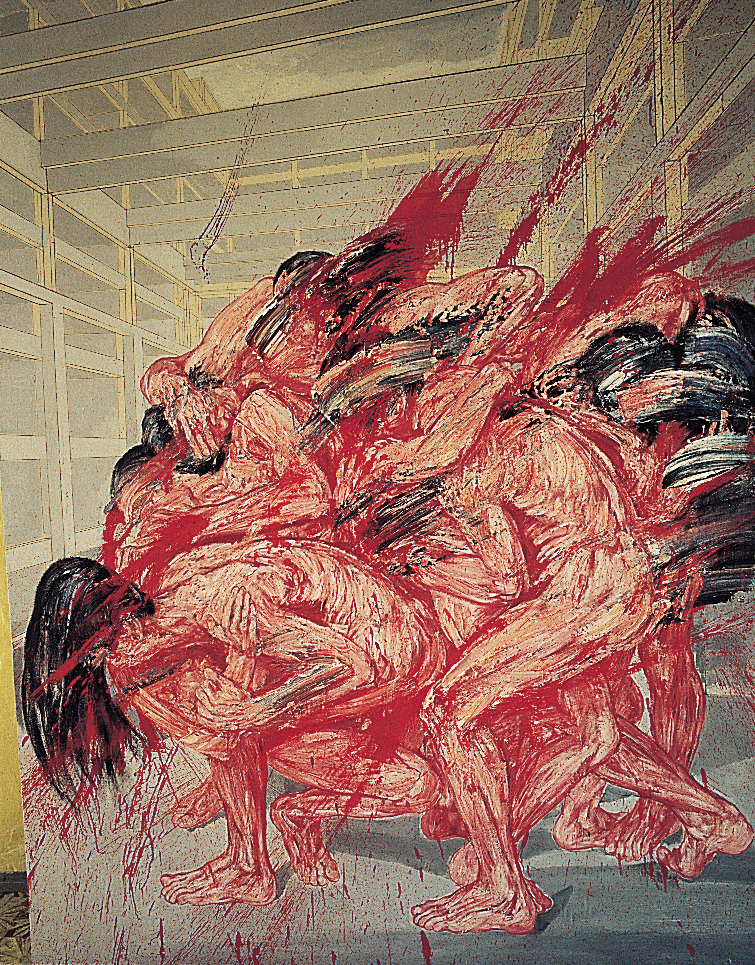
Wrestling (1981–1987)

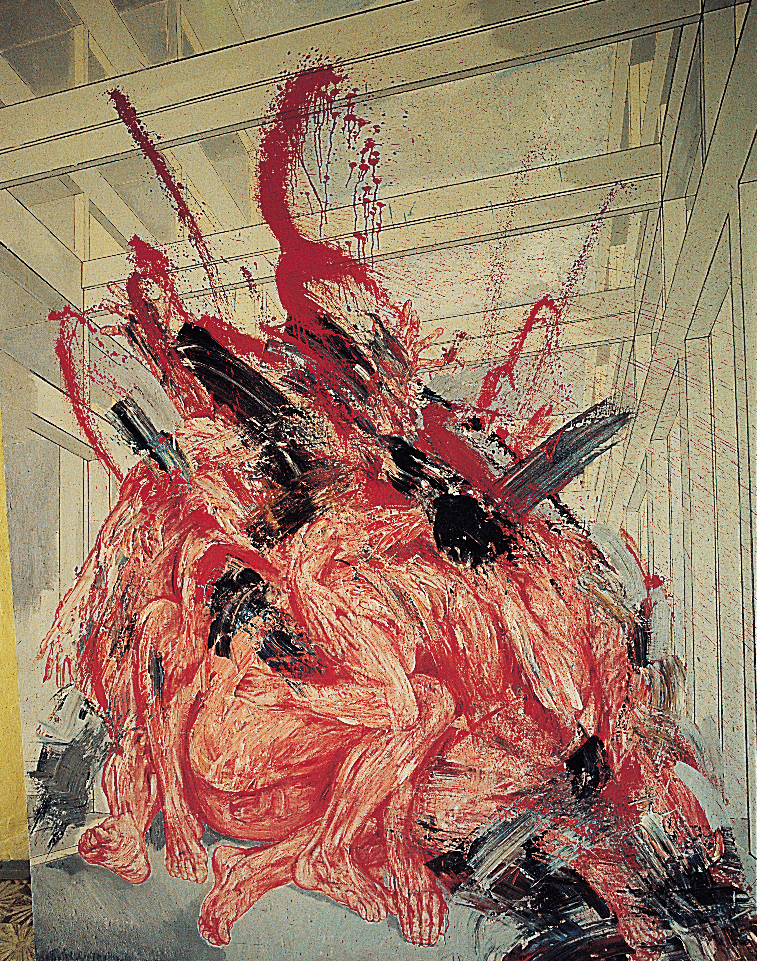
Wrestling (1981–1987)

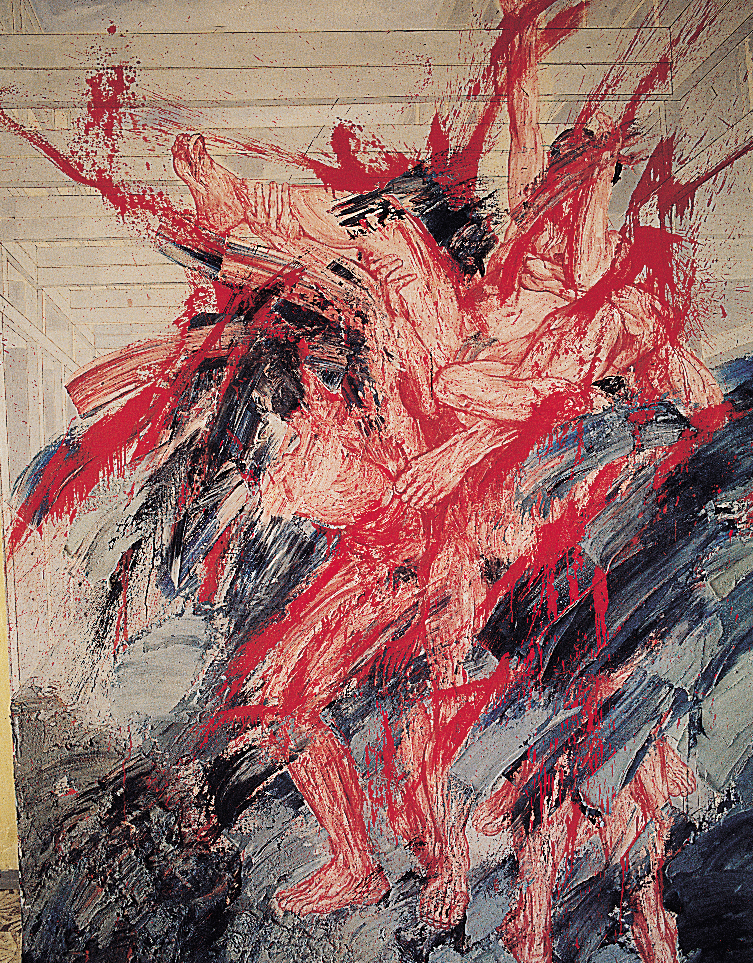
Wrestling (1981–1987)

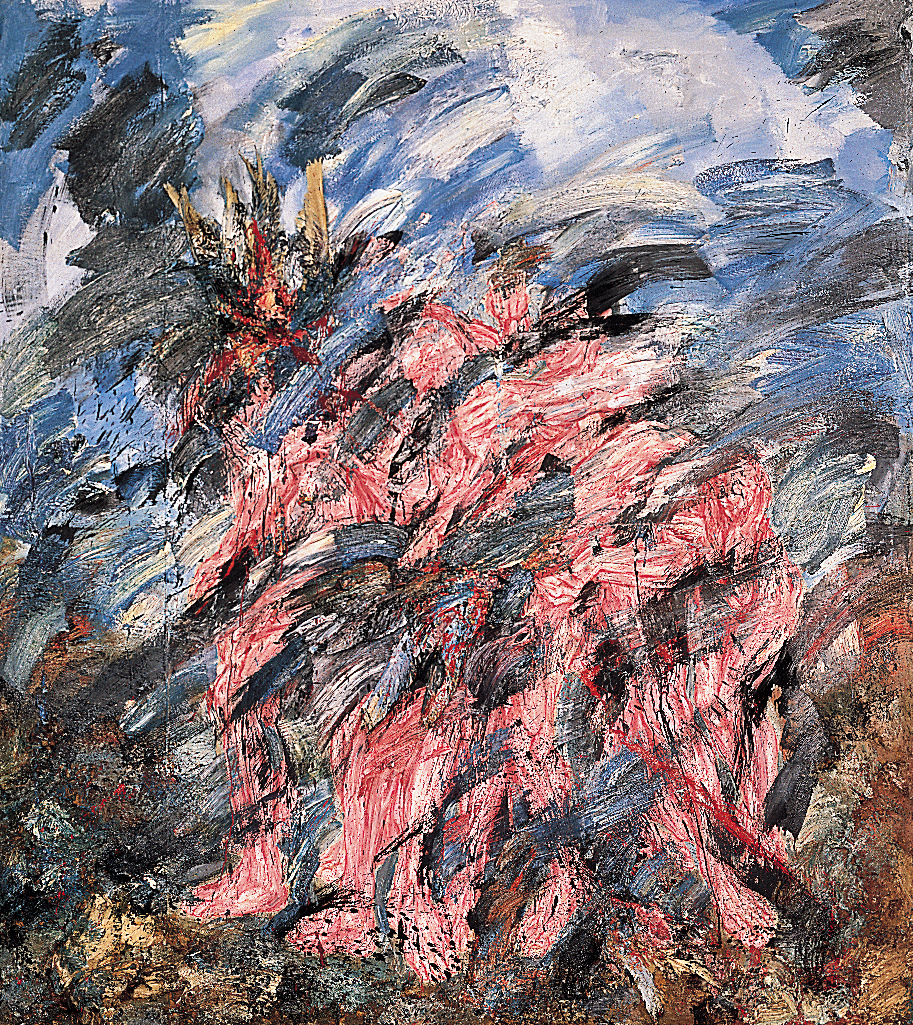
Battlefield (1988–1989)

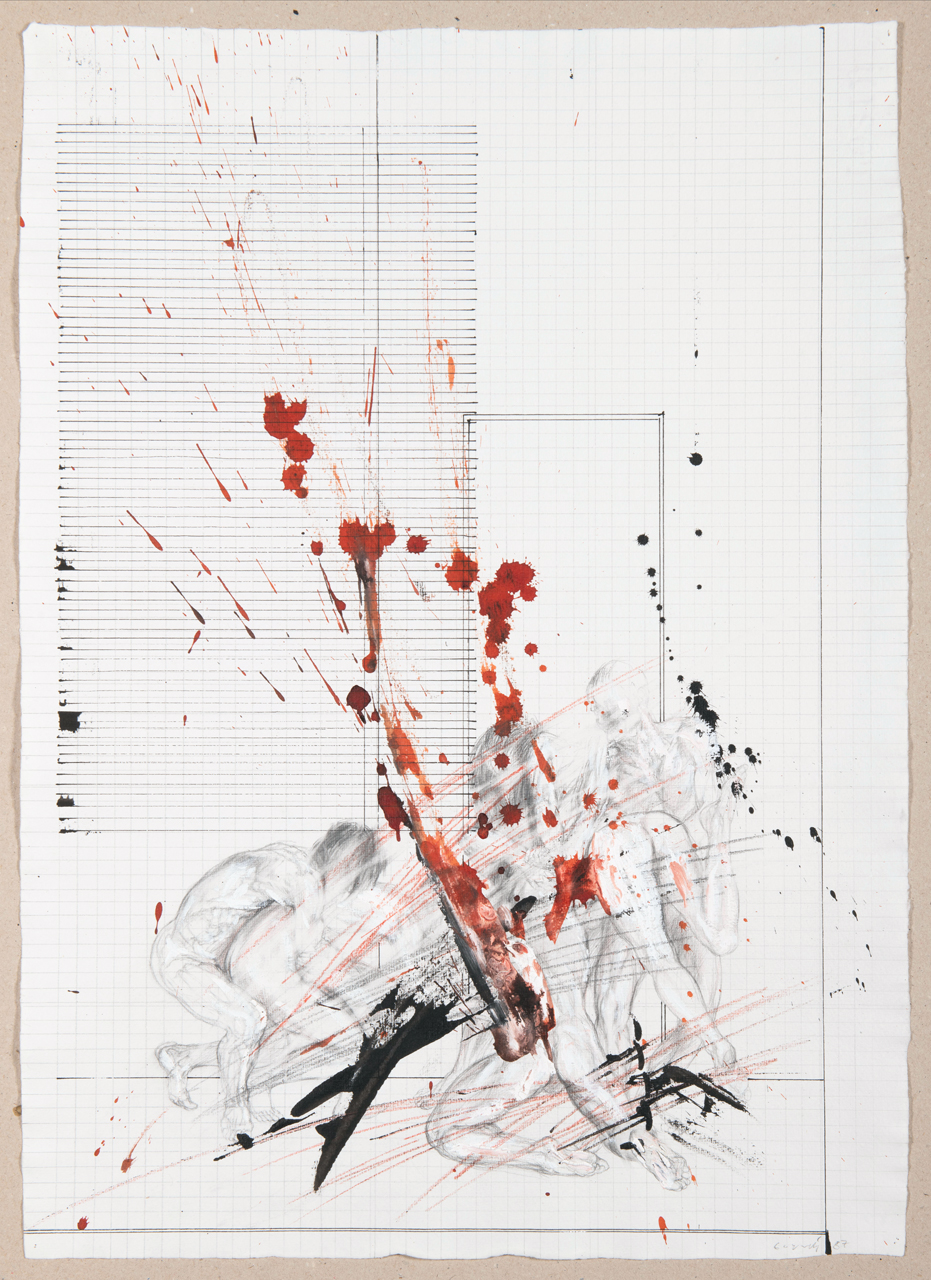
Wrestling (1987)

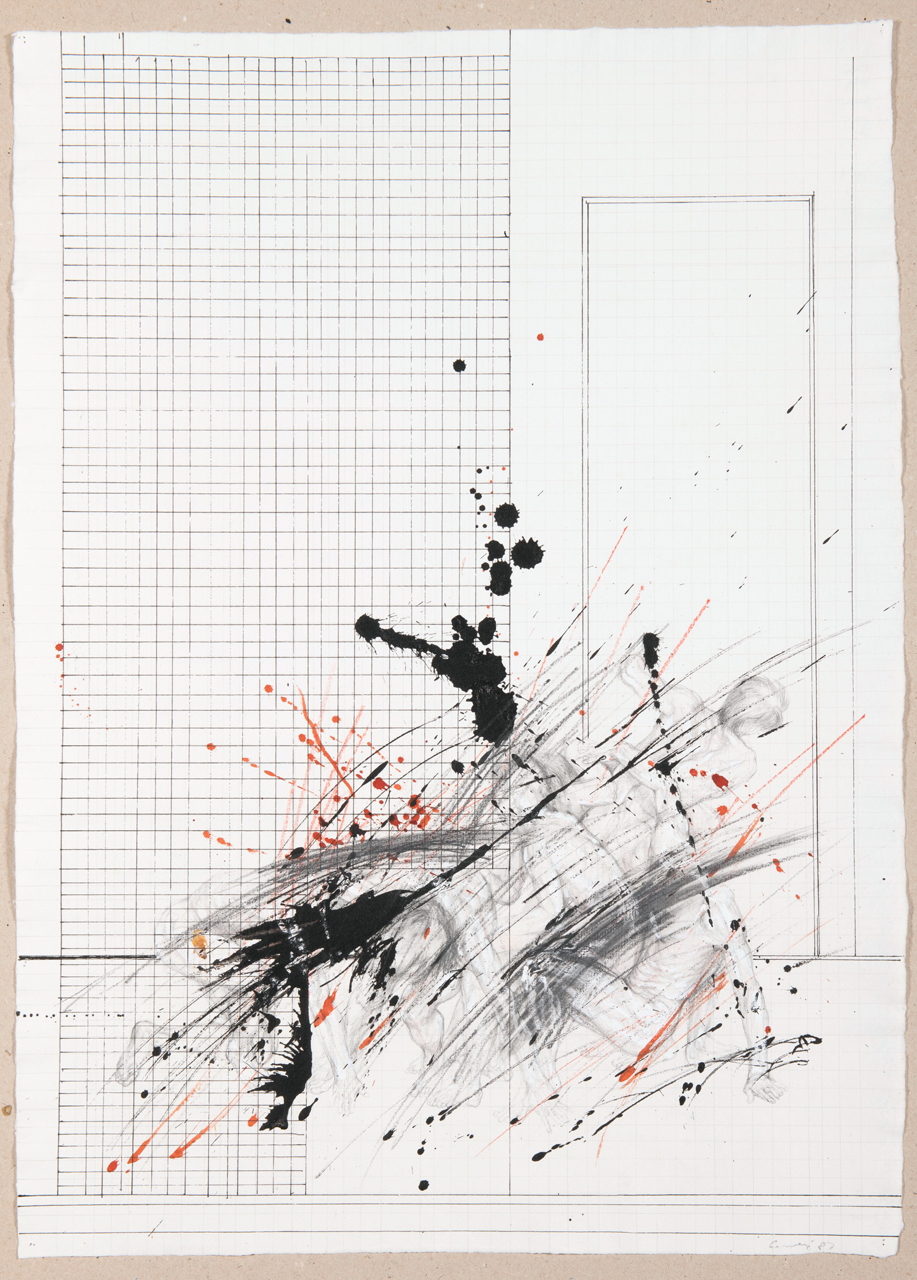
Wrestling (1987)

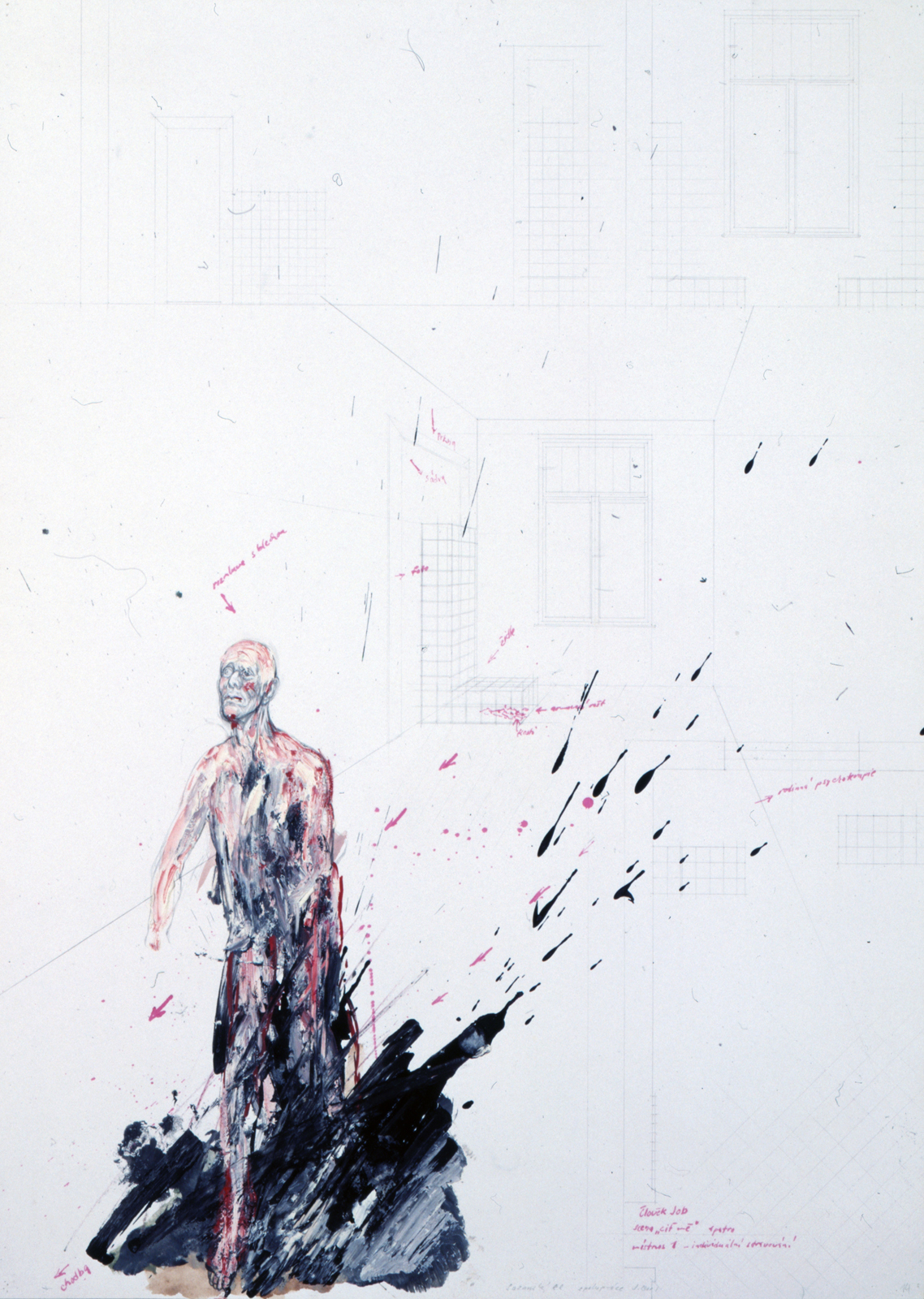
House No. 50, Man Job (1987)

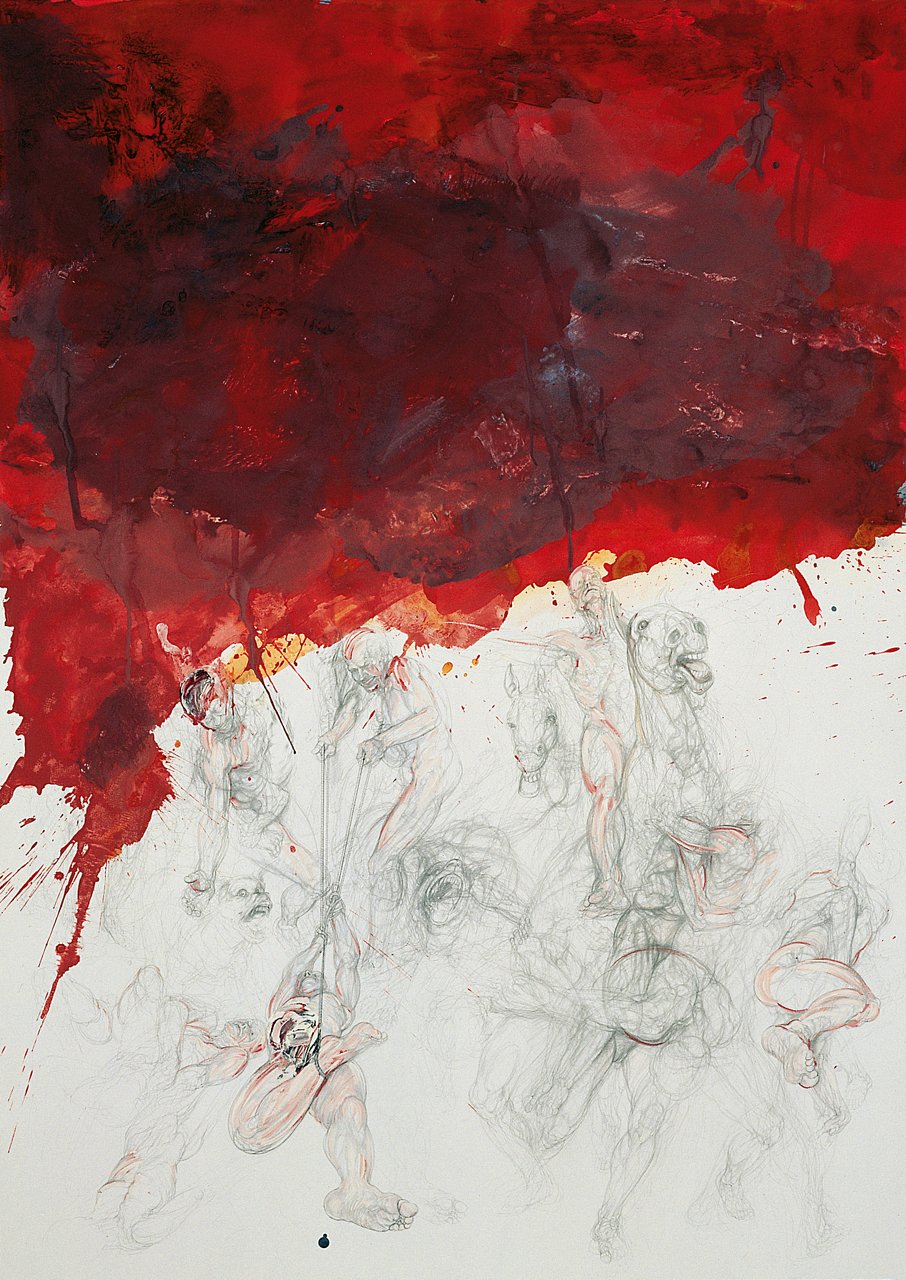
Apokalypse (1993), Kassel

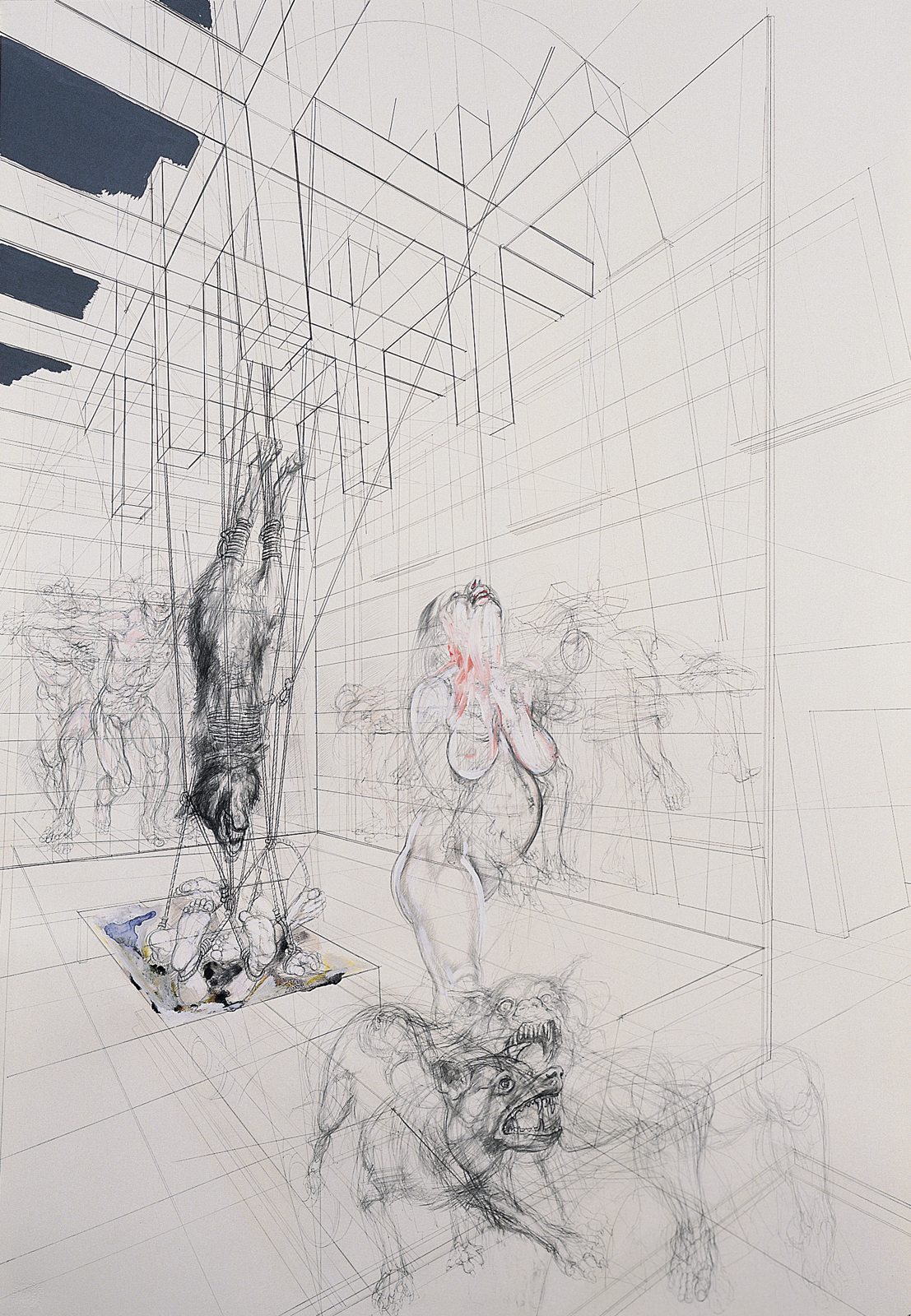
Hour of the Wolves (drawing 1994)

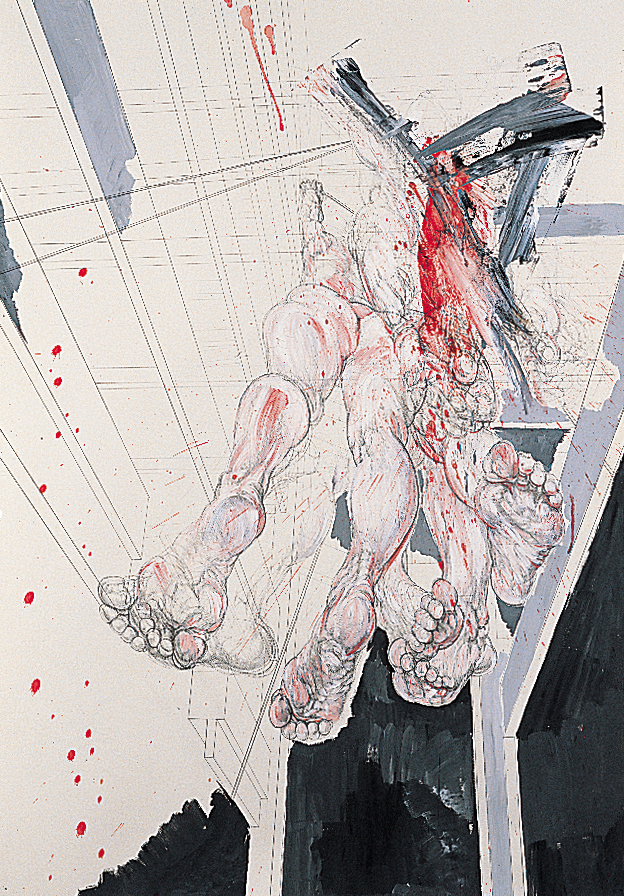
Sacrifice (2023)

=== 1990s ===
In 1990, Sozanský together with the prisoners created a memorial to the victims of totalitarianism in Valdice prison, consisting of concrete torsos of human figures with partially exposed iron construction and reinforced concrete blocks. The prisoners engraved it with the names of their fellow prisoners who had been tortured by the guards. Photodocumentation of the work, together with prisoners' testimonies, was published in a book. The statues installed in the prison's walking yard interfered with normal functioning and in 2007 had to be removed and taken to the Vojna Memorial in the former communist concentration camp and uranium mines near Příbram. Sozanský created a new bronze Memorial to Political Prisoners in front of Valdice prison at the request of the Ministries of Culture and Justice, which was unveiled in 2009. In 1992, he created another monumental memorial to the victims called Memento mori for the Litoměřice Crematorium in the former Nazi concentration camp and Richard Underground Factory and Mines.

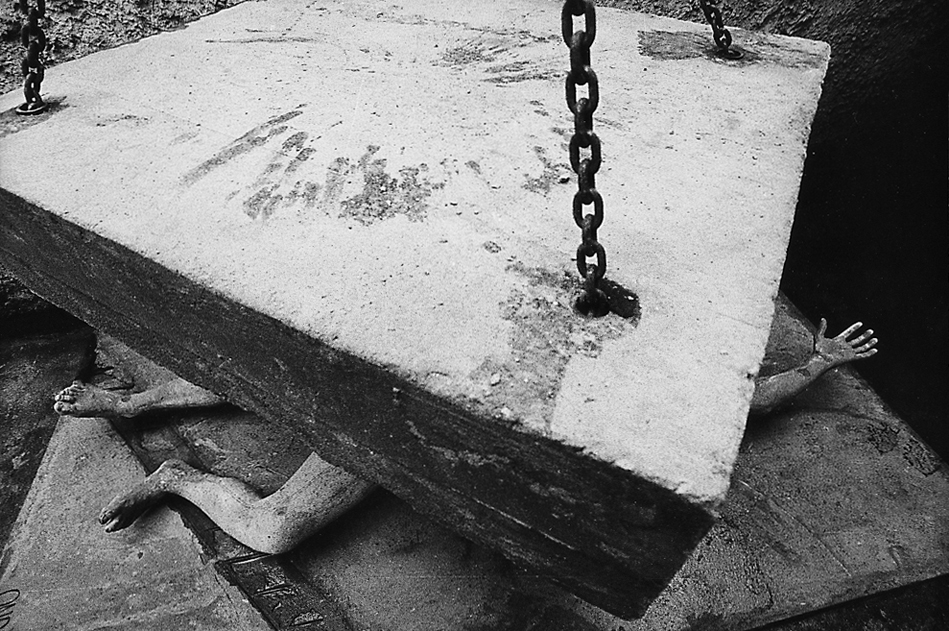
Jiří Sozanský, Valdice prison yard (1990)

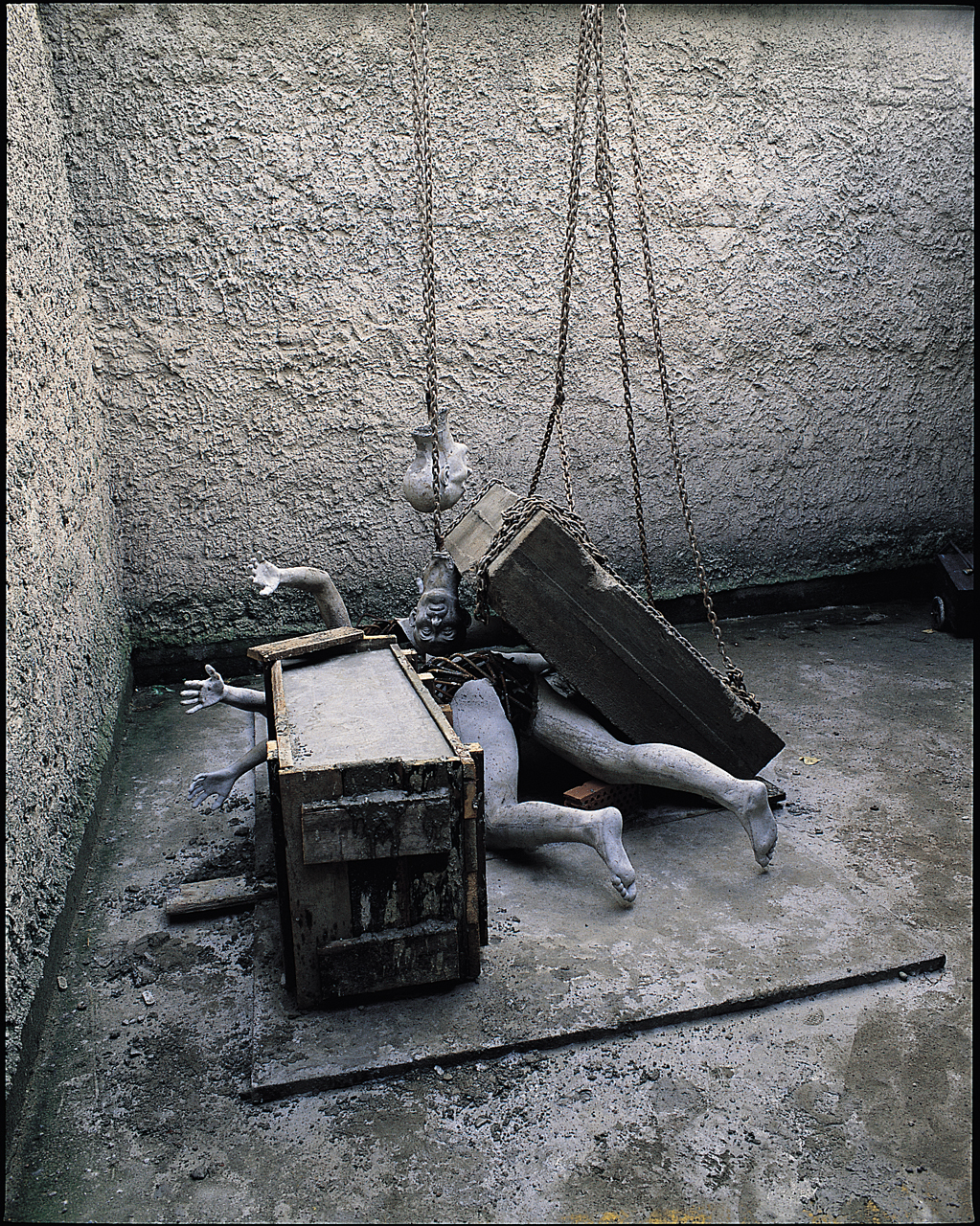
Jiří Sozanský, Valdice prison yard (1990)

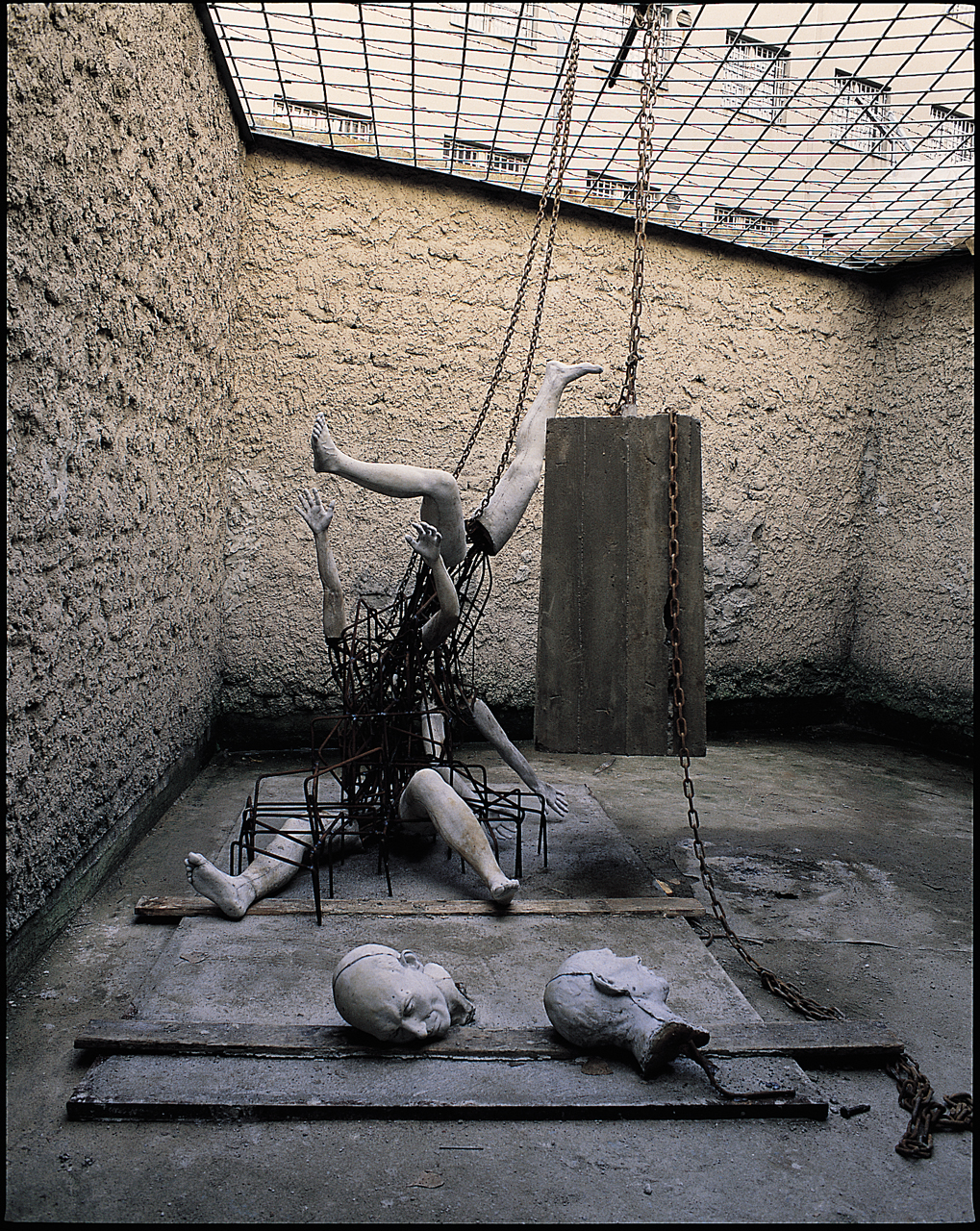
Jiří Sozanský, Valdice prison yard (1990)

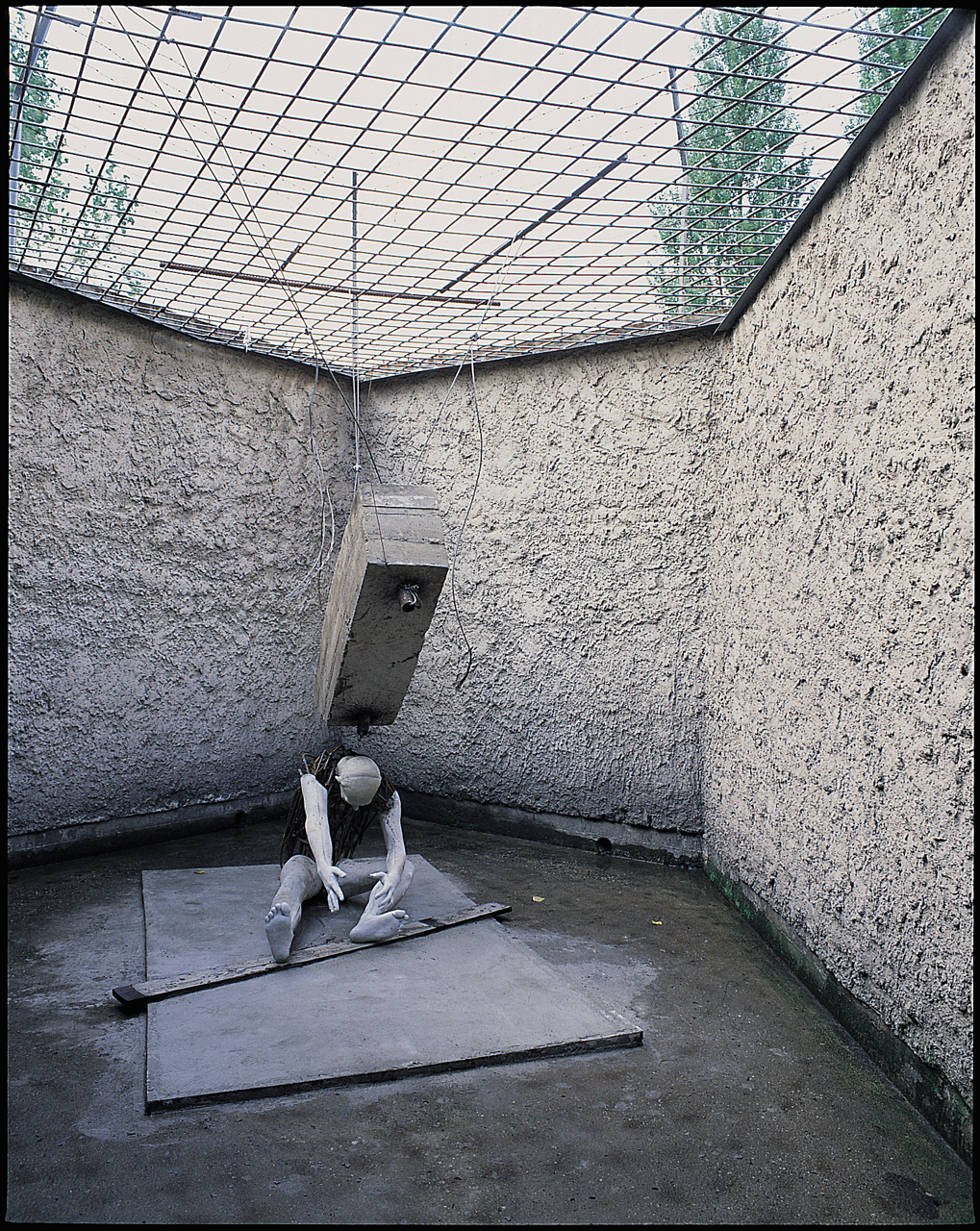
Jiří Sozanský, Valdice prison yard (1990)

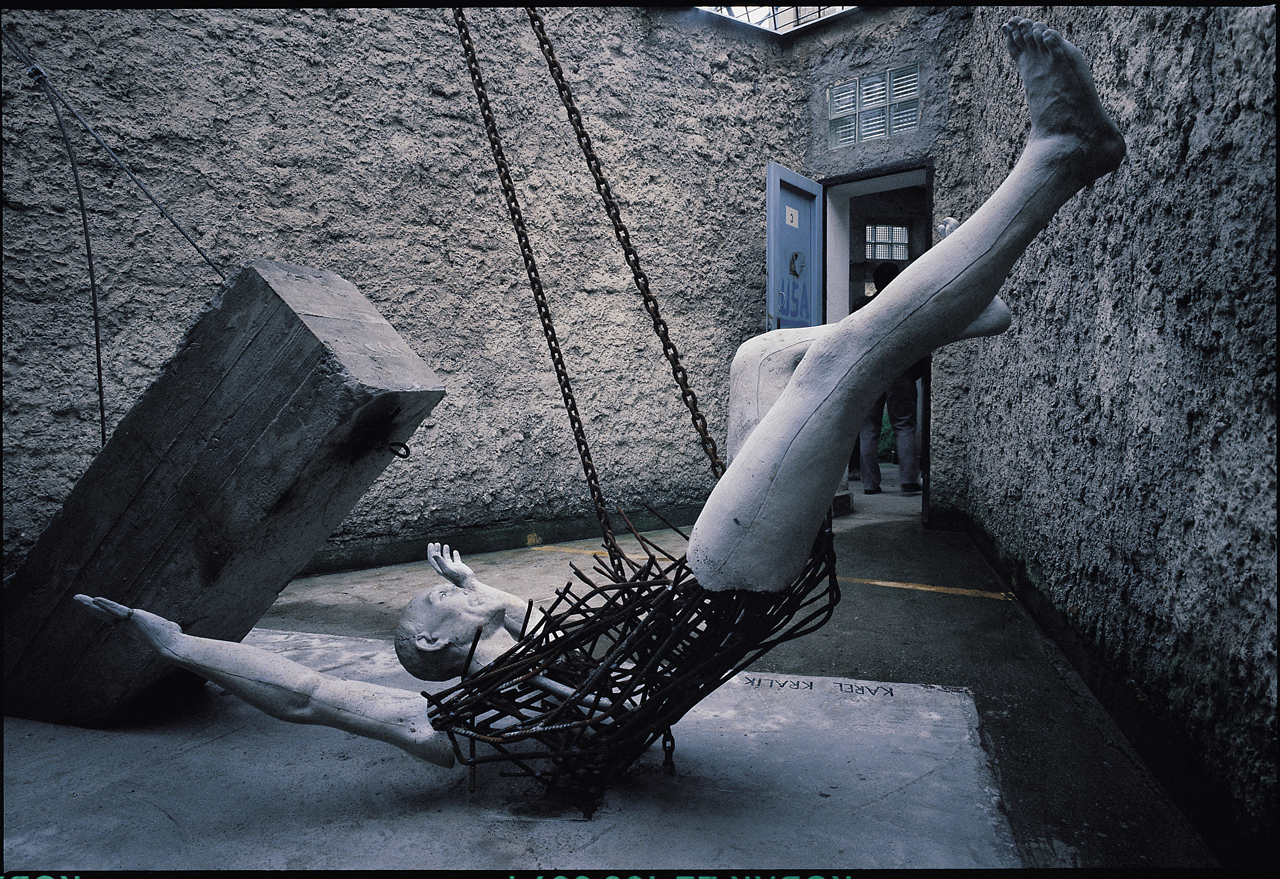
Jiří Sozanský, Valdice prison yard (1990)

After returning from Sarajevo, he exhibited his photographic records, collages and drawings in New synagogue in Libeň, Prague. The exhibition City under Siege included a performance by the theatre group HAMADA. During his trips to Sarajevo, the burnt down University Library, designed by the Czech architect Vítek, became a focal point for Sozanský. He held an exhibition of his paintings on the theme The Struggle of Angels at this site. The total area of the Forum populi canvases, assembled into a single unit, was 12 x 7 metres. The statics of the library walls were disturbed and the whole installation collapsed in January 1996. In 1996, Sozanský participated in the Tribute to Sarajevo with his installation in Grbavica (Sarajevo), a performance by a theatre group (Attempted Resurrection, September 1996) and the launching of burning straw bales on the bridge over the Miljacka river to symbolise the expulsion of the evil spirit of war The final exhibition Art in Extreme Situation, which presented Sozansky's works on the Sarajevo mission, was held in 1977 at Le Clos des Arts in Brussels The city of Sarajevo itself, together with the testimony of refugees from the territories occupied by Serbian paramilitary forces, became the inspiration for a series of paintings on the theme of Apocalypse.

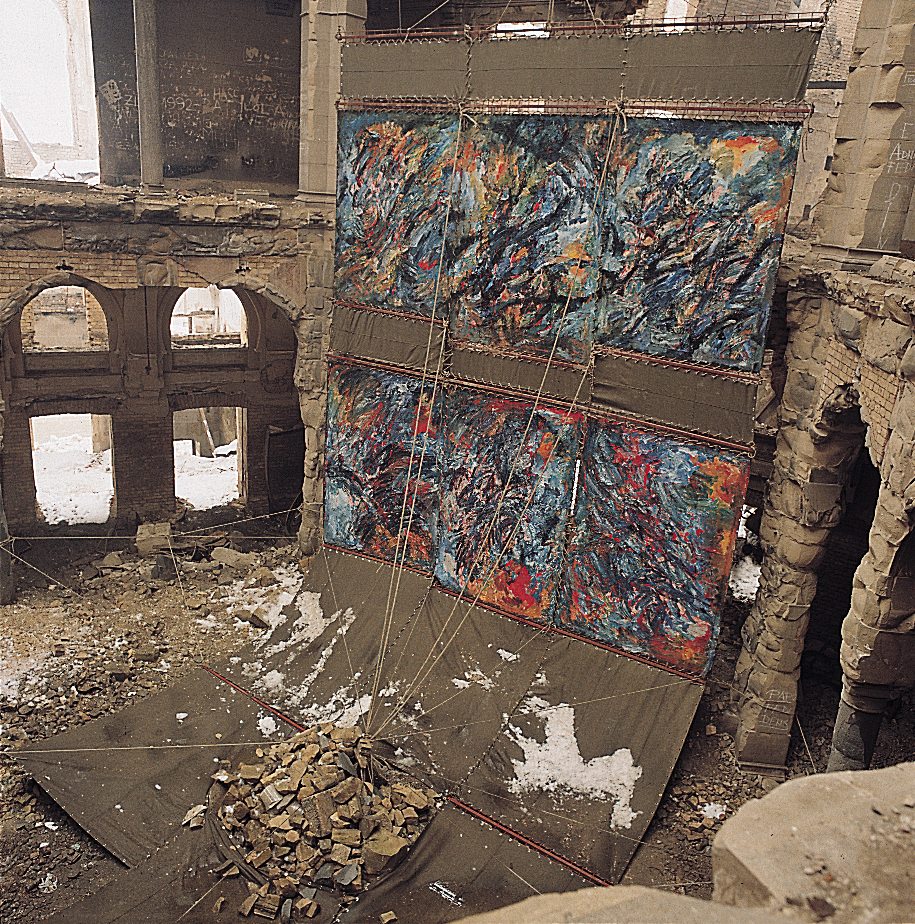
Forum populi, Sarajevo 1995

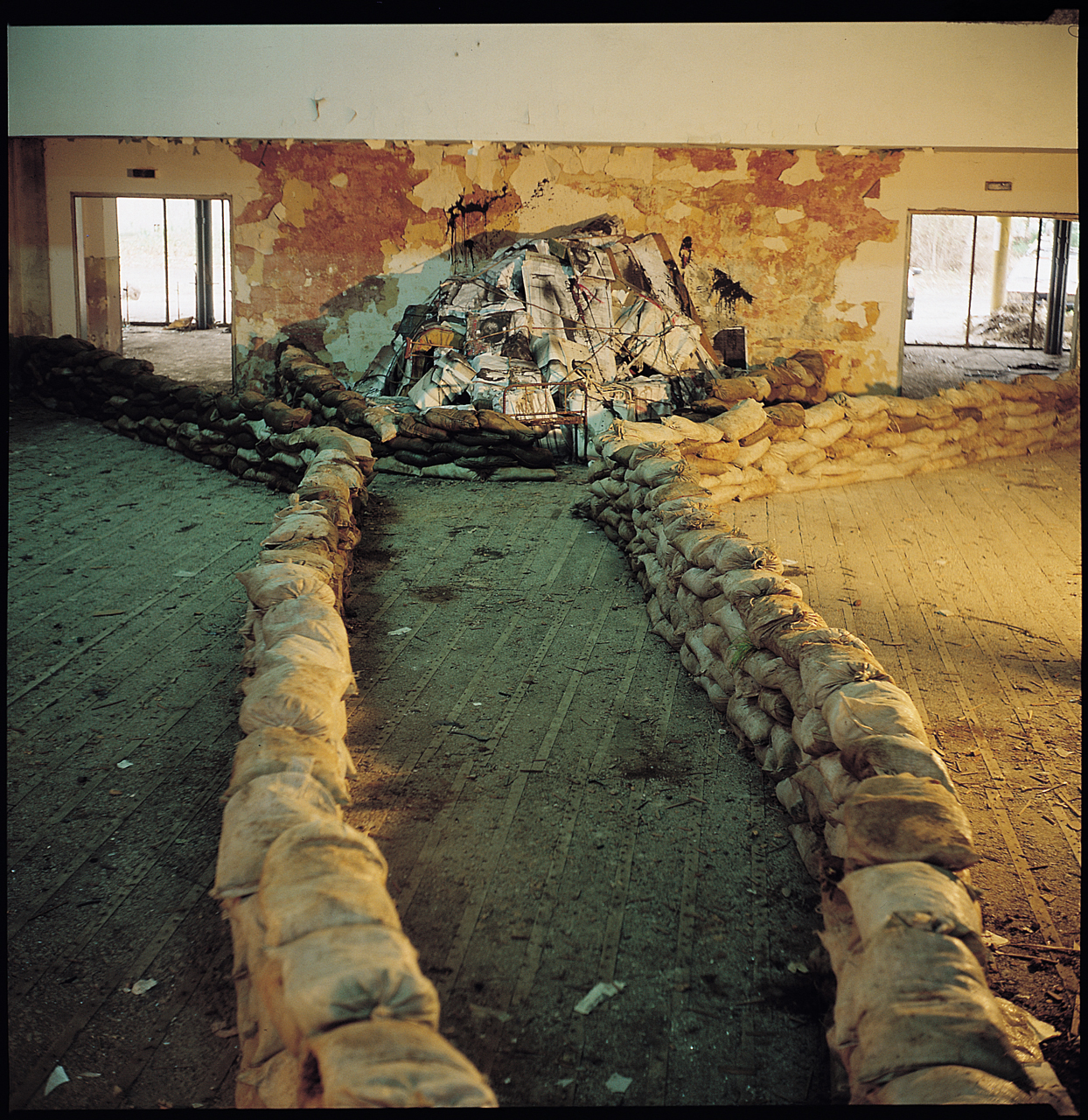
Hommage to Sarajevo 1996

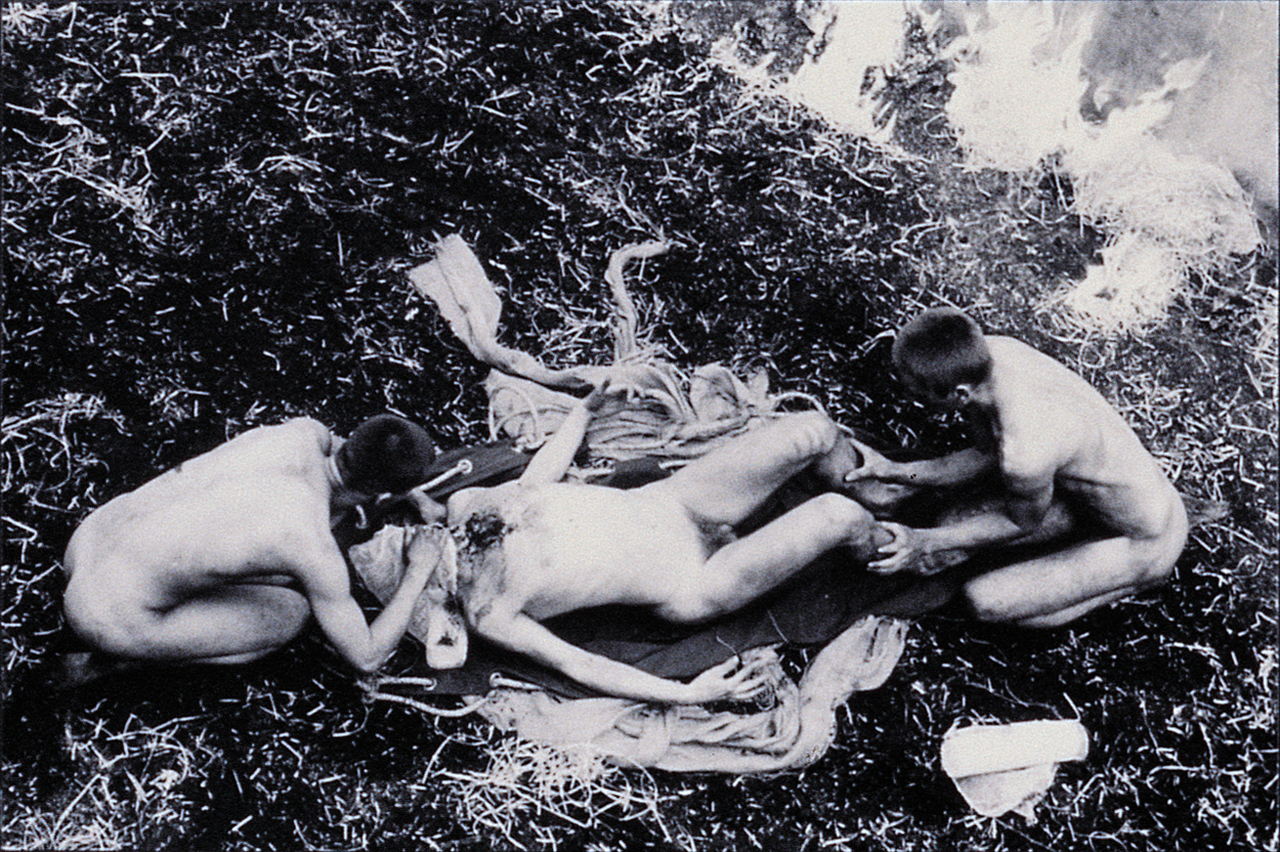
Attempted Resurrection, Sarajevo 1996

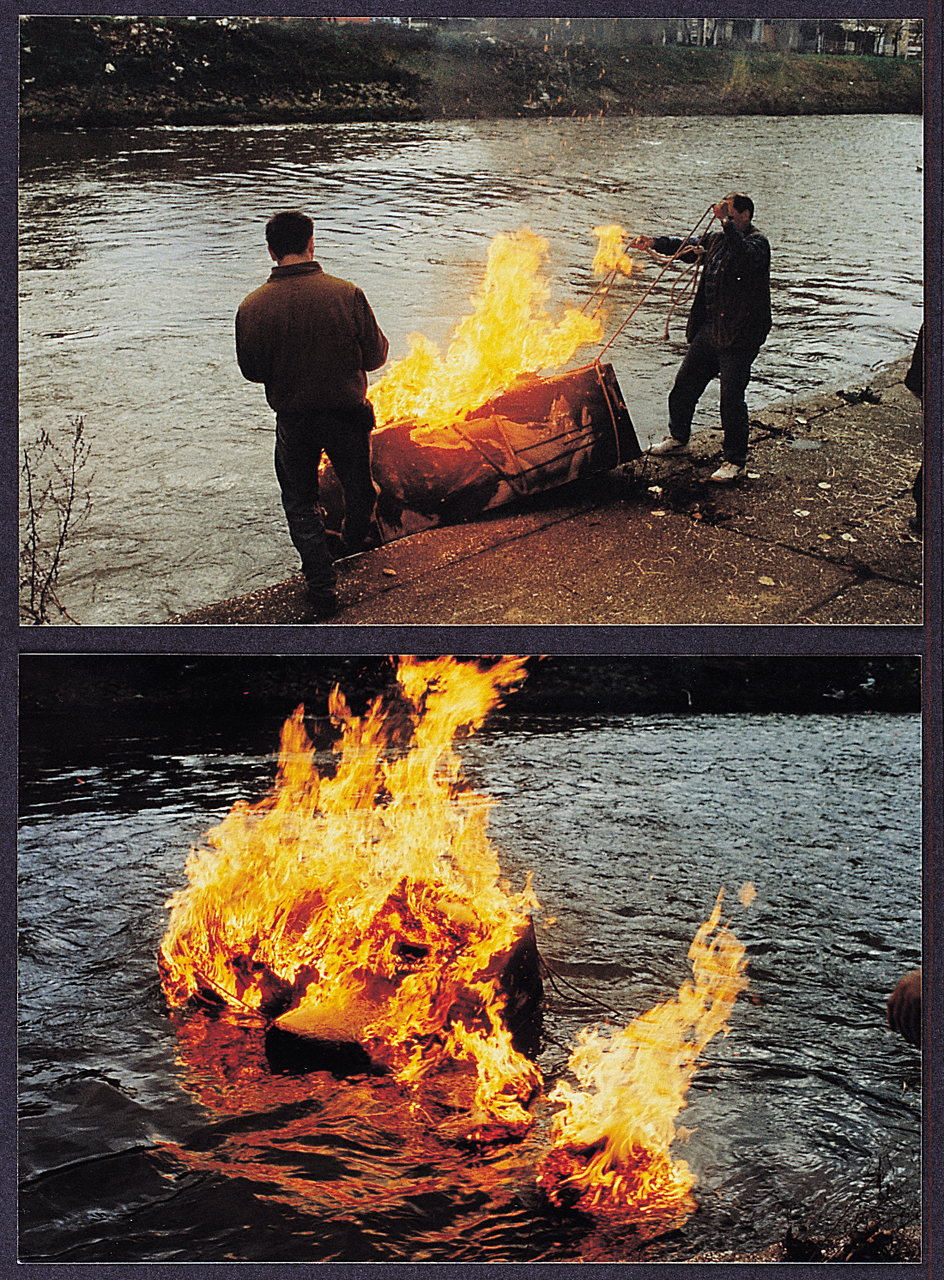
The sweeping away of evil, Sarajevo 1996

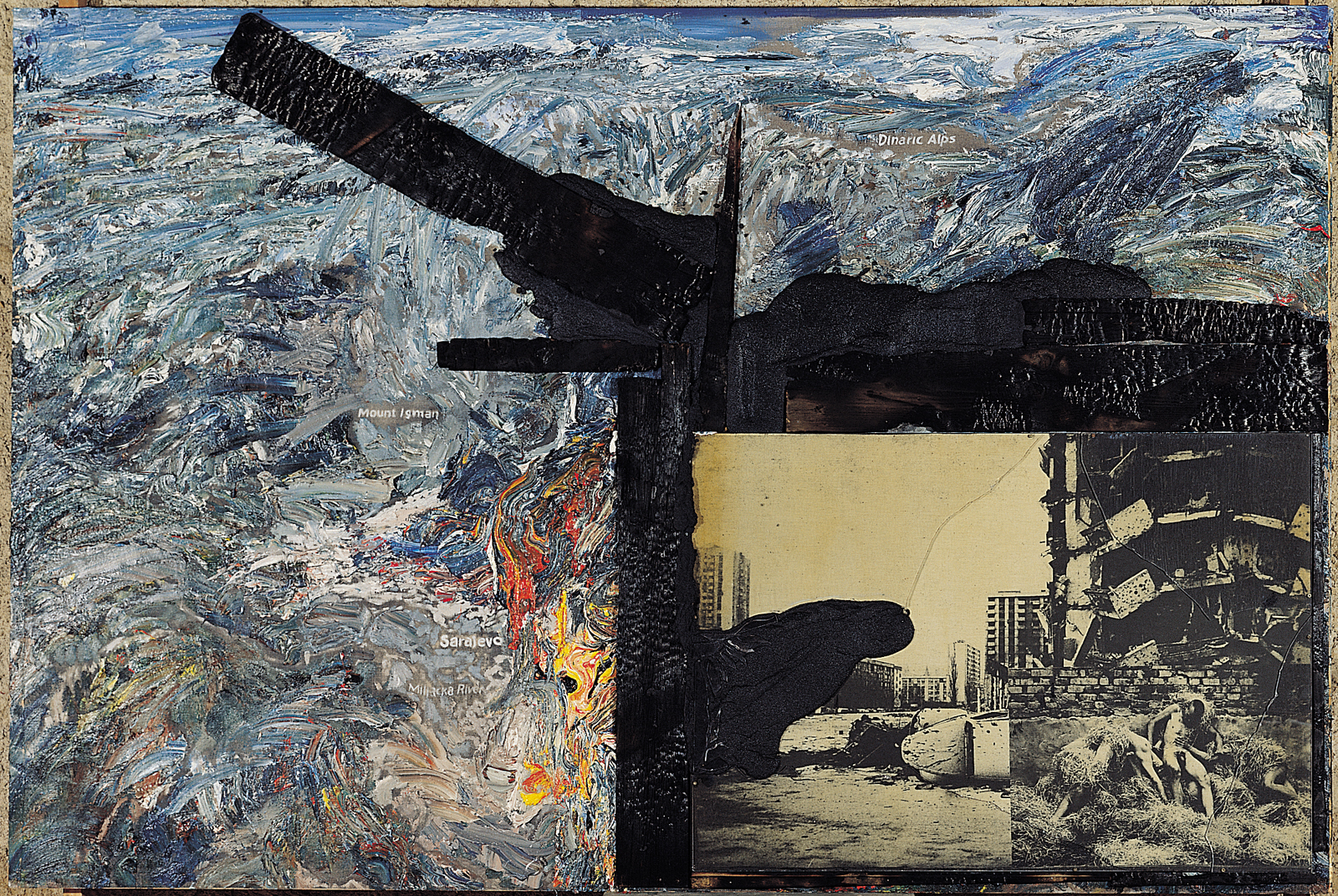
Collage, Brussels 1997

The previous paintings are loosely related to the graphic cycles Beasts (1999), Refugees (2000), Hunt (2000) and large-scale etchings of the series Stone and Bone (2001), inspired by the poetry of Jan Zahradníček. Sozansky's work with the performers was continuously documented with photographs, which served as the basis for repaints in many variations. In 1996, these works were adjusted into metal constructions and installed as Depository of Anxiety in cell No. 42 in Terezín Small Fortress.

=== 2000–2010 ===
Accidentally discovered samizdat edition of poem Znamení moci (Signs of Power) (Note: In the poem, the author uses poetic means and deep allegories to portray the communist regime that seized power in Czechoslovakia and other countries of the world. He describes the collapse of human society and its moral values and the monstrosity of a regime that deceived the people and robbed them of their humanity.) by Jan Zahradníček provided Sozanský with a new source of inspiration for works dealing with the spiritual legacy of prisoners of communist and Nazi concentration camps. Since 2000, he has used fragments of the texts as an equal part of his pictorial collages, drawings and paintings.

In 2003 Sozanský responded to the disastrous flood of Prague in 2002, which completely devastated part of the Karlín district, with an installation of large-scale paintings that combined Samuel Beckett texts (Stories and Texts for Nothing) with photographs, painting and assemblage, on and around the Negrelli Viaduct (the Exodus, Animation of Cruelty, Battlefield, Incident, Struggle of Angels, Apocalypse, Flood series). The project included performances by the ensembles Teatr Novogo Fronta, Boxart, Palaestra, etc., on Beckett's texts in the devastated interior of the Musical Theatre Karlín, scripted and set-designed by J. Sozansky.

On the occasion of the 60th anniversary of the end of World War II and the 10th anniversary of the end of ethnic conflicts in the former Yugoslavia, Sozanský exhibited a series From Dust and Ashes (2005) in Old Town Hall, which loosely followed the previous Meeting with Beckett and Homage to Jan Zahradníček - Stone and Bone. The basis for the large-scale drawings, paintings and collages combined with texts were the records of prisoners from Auschwitz and Primo Levi and Viktor Frankl and part of the personal notes of the Nazi commander of Auschwitz Rudolf Höss published during the Nuremberg Trial. In 2007 he expanded this series to include works inspired by Willy Mahler's diary, which was used by Arnošt Goldflam in 1996 as the basis for the play Sweet Theresienstadt at the Archa Theatre.

In 2006, Sozanský presented the sculpture Apocalyptic Horseman as part of the Year with Jewish Culture at the Libeň New Synagogue, which was later transferred to the garden of Troja Palace.

From the memorial to the victims of totalitarianism, originally created in 1990 in the Valdice Prison, which was deinstalled and partially destroyed in 2007, the torsos of human figures were transported to the former communist concentration camp Vojna in the Příbram District. In 2009–2010, the sculptures were restored, supplemented with a ladder with a bronze statue and a concrete pedestal, and the Memorial to the Victims of Communism thus acquired a definitive form. Sozanský elaborated his personal life experience with the communist regime in 2009 in a sculpture entitled The Sixty-Ninth, where he incorporated a posthumous mask of Jan Palach. Together with the sculptures The Grand Inquisitor and The Allies, it is placed in the foyer of the High Court in Prague. In the conference room of the High court in Prague, a composed evening took place, which included a part of Aleš Březina's opera Tomorrow will be... with Soňa Červená.

Sozansky's active preoccupation with boxing and a number of his organised performances of struggling naked human figures have been reflected in his drawings and paintings since the 1980s (Working with the Body, Mánes 2000). The anatomy of the human body and movement is based on the Renaissance and Baroque masters, but after his visit to Rome in 2009, the inspiration of classical antiquity can also be seen in his work. The first such work is the larger-than-life sculpture The Guardian (2008) for the Supreme Audit Office, as well as drawings - studies of human bodies and paintings inspired by Colosseum public spectacles presented as part of the project Sevřeni v těle (The Caught in the Flesh) (Colosseum. Winners and Losers, Mánes, Prague 2008).

In 2010, Sozansky revisited concentration camp in Auschwitz to take new photographic documentation in an attempt to bring closure to this theme in his work. The result was a series of large-scale paintings with the dominant motif of the railroad tracks and prison buildings, where the presence of people resembles only a clutter of abstract colour patches. He also used photographs from Auschwitz for photo collages combining these images with recordings of performances of naked actors, dogs, texts, paintings and colourful images from the slaughterhouse in the cycles Kafilerie (Rendering) and Scavengers (2010–2015). For other cycles of photographic collages, the Karlín and post-flood images were the basis for Sutiny (The Rubble) and Ghetto (2010–2015).

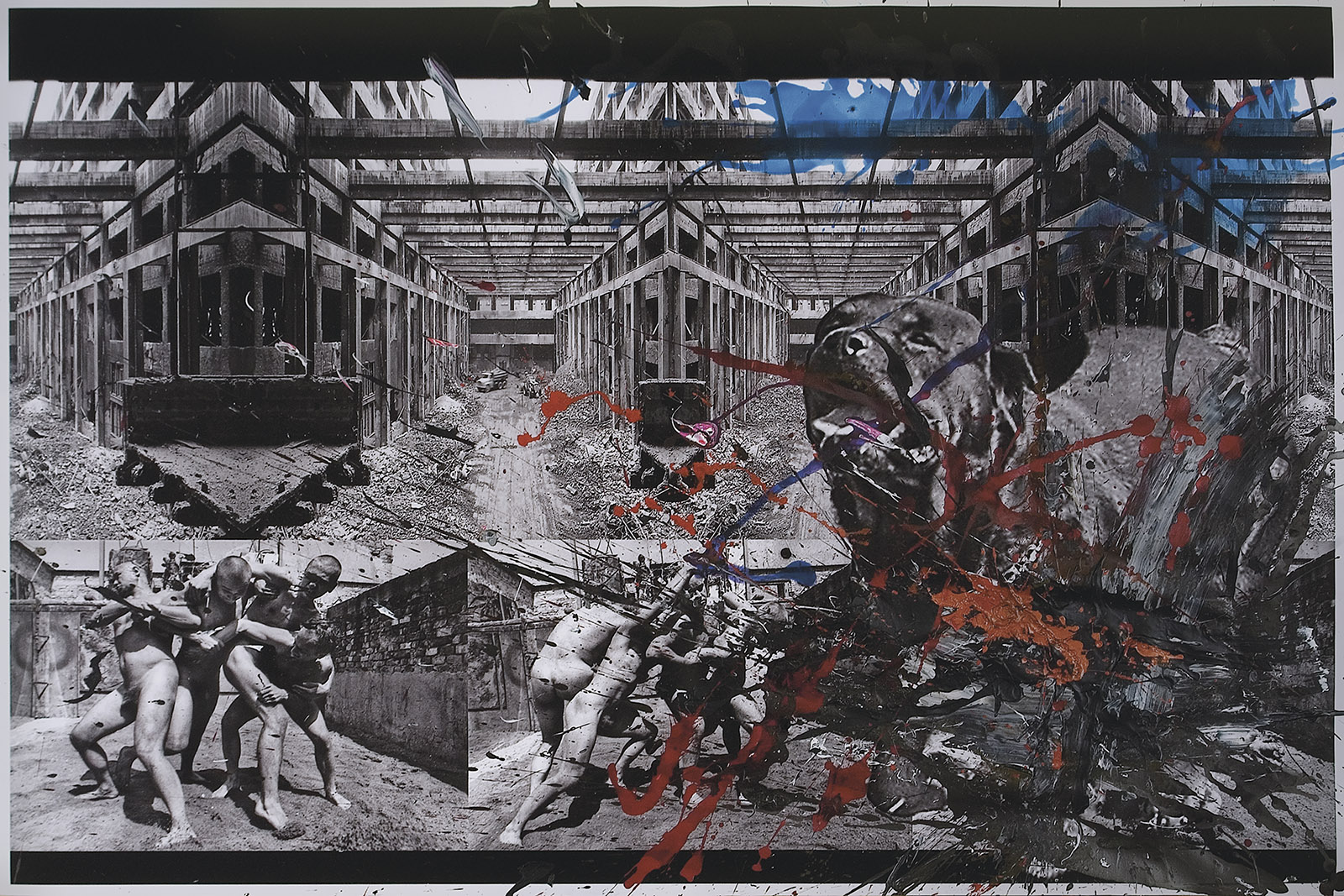
Hunt, photocollage, ink, acrylic 90 x 150 cm, 2010

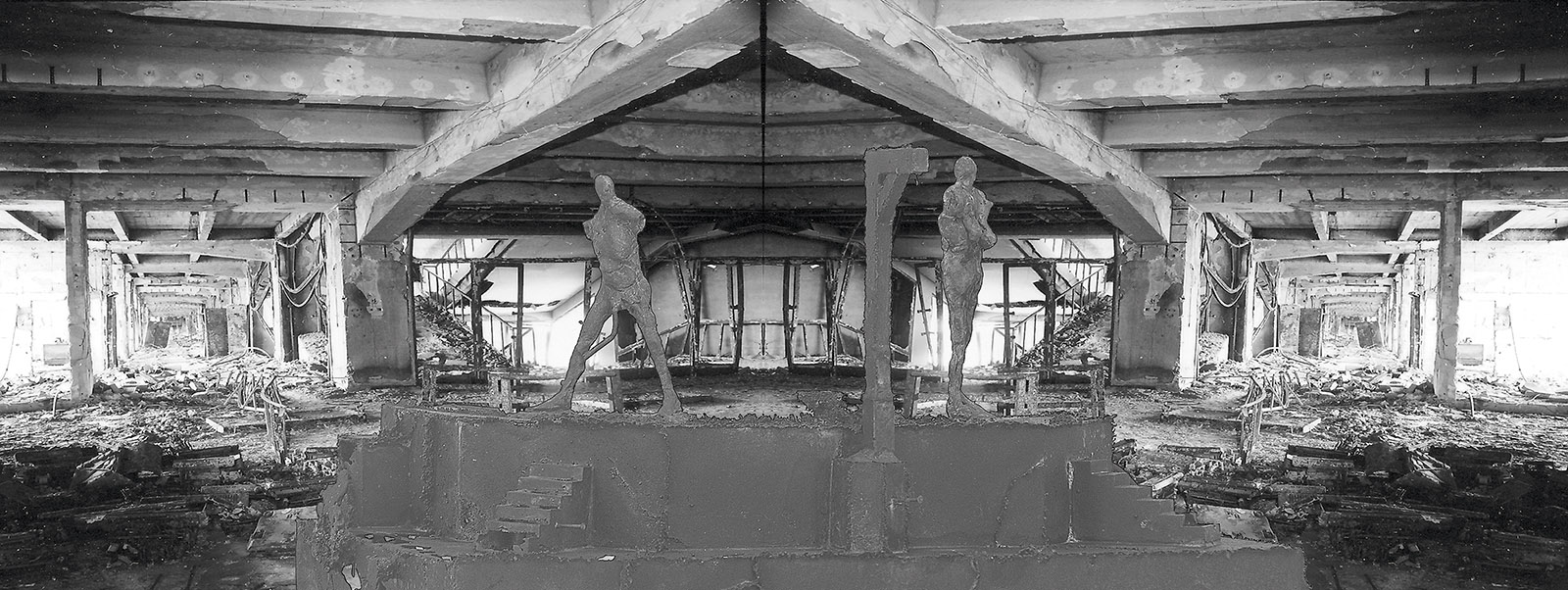
Execution Grounds, photocollage 50 x 130 cm, 2014

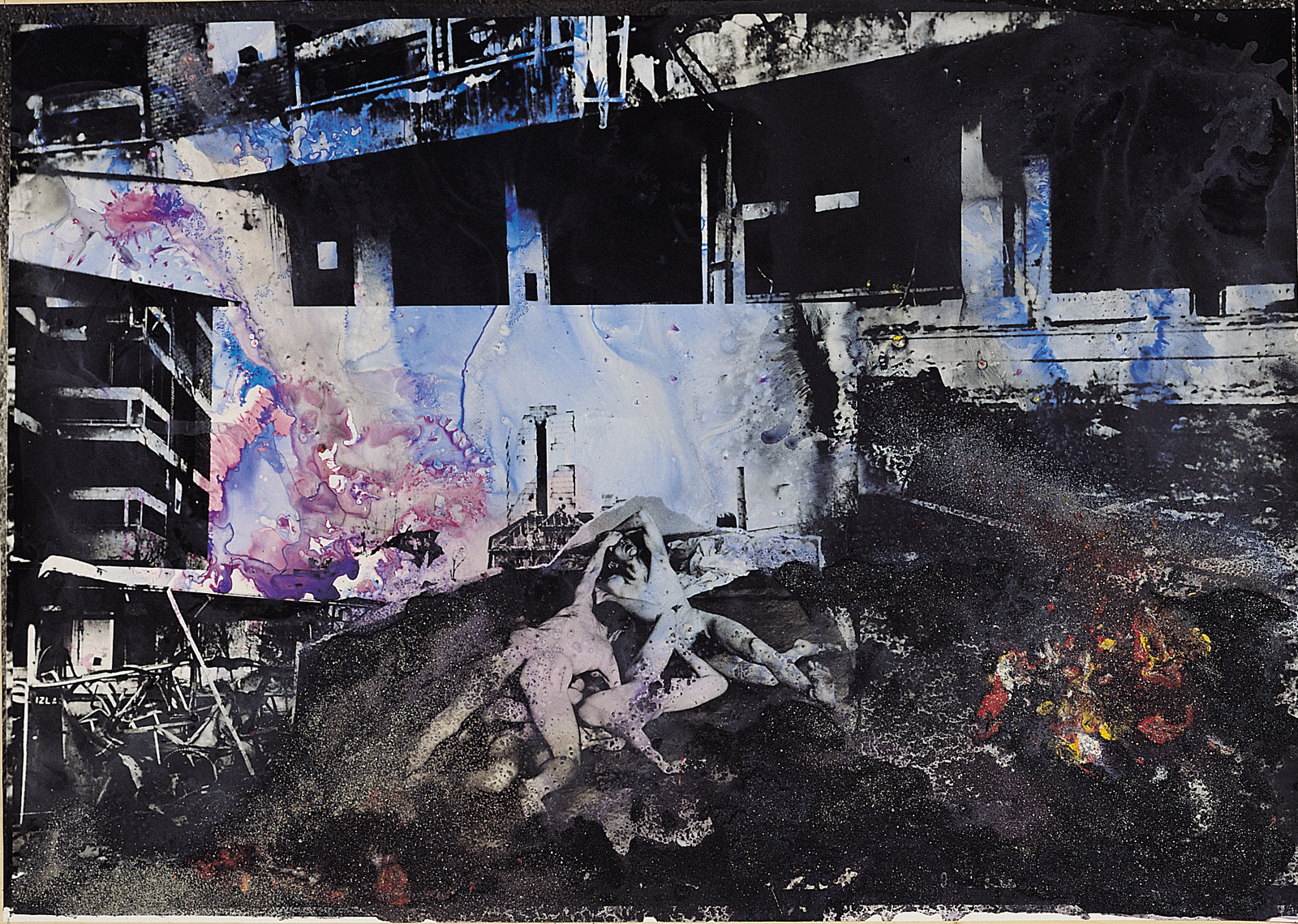
The Rubble (2010–2015)

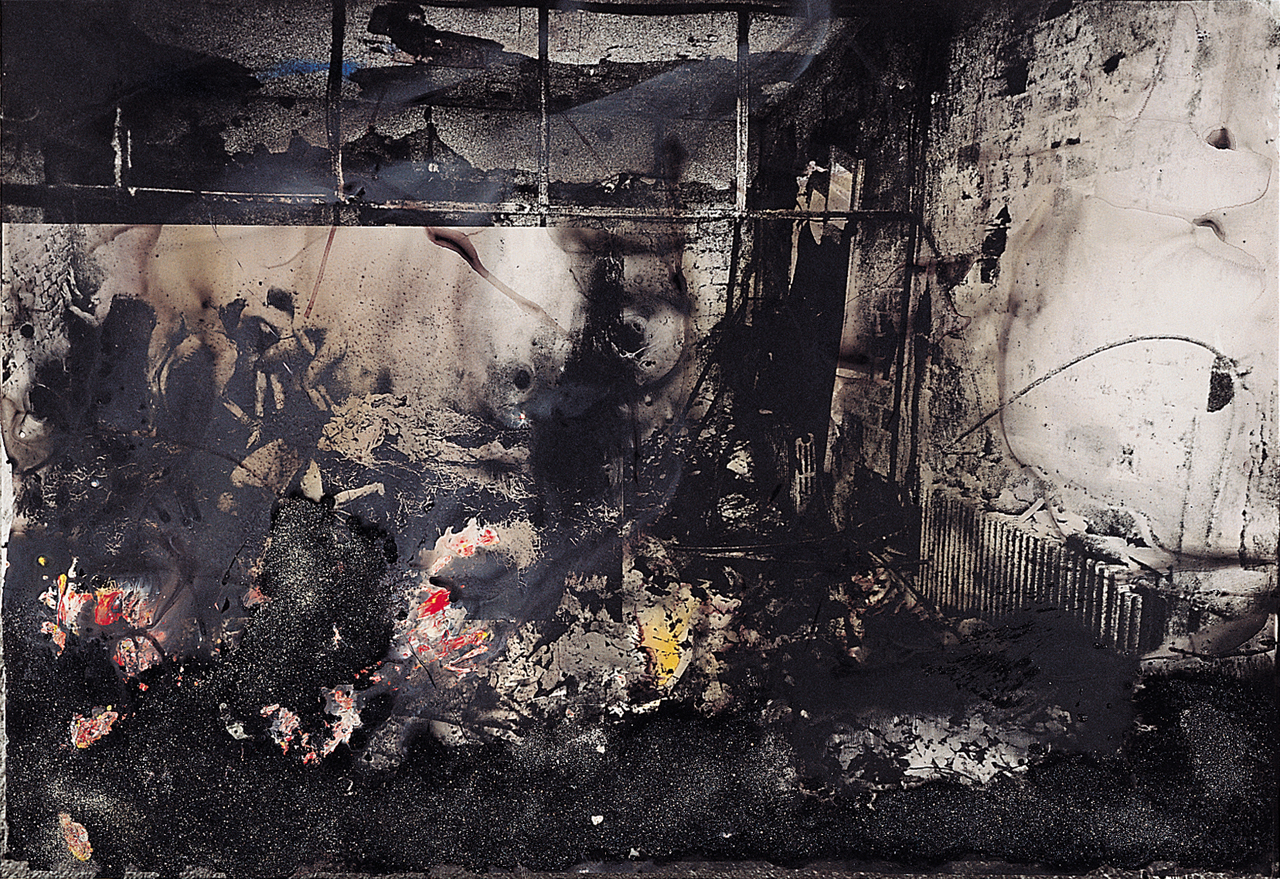
The Rubble (2010–2015)

Sozanský's project The Twenty-Seventh Day (2010) reflects on the 60th anniversary of the staged show trials of the 1950s and directly refers to the date of the execution of Milada Horáková, Jan Buchal, Záviš Kalandra and Oldřich Pecl on 27 June 1950. Sozanský exhibited expressive photo-collages and contemplative drawings at the Straka Academy and installed three sculptures created for the project at the High Court in Prague. His next sculpture, Mater Mortis, placed on a plinth in front of the Office of the Government of the Czech Republic, is a deliberate reminder, in its brutality and sensual aggression, of the two regimes that sentenced Horáková to death, as well as of the contemporary hysteria of women's labour collectives, who cried out for the heaviest sentence for her. In cooperation with the Mene Tekel festival, the paintings and sculptures of the Twenty-seventh Day project were exhibited at Karolinum (2011).

On the 20th anniversary of the end of the communist regime, Symposion Civic Association realized Jiří Sozanský's project Closed at the Municipal House, focusing on important personalities of Czech culture who fell victim to communist rule (Záviš Kalandra, Jan Zahradníček, Ivan Martin Jirous). The project included an exhibition Homage to Magor, which consisted of graphic sheets with excerpts of texts by Ivan M. Jirous – Magor.

=== 2011–2024 ===
In 2011 Sozanský exhibited his project Metropolis as a personal tribute to Prague. The series consisted of large-format oil paintings of Prague monuments, some early works and sculptures: the biblical sculpture Crucifixion and an original representation of St. Vitus Cathedral. The 2012 Olympic year was commemorated by a group of sporting artists around Jiří Sozanský with a joint exhibition Ekecheiria - a tribute to the Olympic tradition at the City of Prague Museum. Sozanský exhibited large-scale drawings celebrating the beauty of the body, paintings and sculptural studies of wrestlers. In collaboration with Meda Mládková and architect David Vávra, thematic exhibitions Skeletons (2010), The Zone (2013), Homage to Jan Palach (2014) were organized at Museum Kampa.

In 2014, Sozanský presented his project 1984 – The Year of Orwell for the first time in public at Trade Fair Palace. The entire project was created 30 years earlier in 1984 in a situation when the communist regime drove independent culture underground and artists lived with the feeling of permanent threat from the authorities and a network of confidents they did not know at the time. The architecture of the burnt-out building expressed well the dehumanizing conditions of the normalization regime ("execution ground of conscience") and, as a monumental cage, it suited well the intention to create a film documentary describing various existential situations there. From the basic script from 1983 to 1984, sketches and photo documentation of the actions (Survive, Escapes, The Hunt, Mechanisms of Power, There and Back, Massacre, The Human Couple) have survived. To these, Sozanský added works from the series Fragments of Memory and paintings and sculptures inspired by the architecture of the building (Skeleton, Ashes), photo collages against the background of the burnt-out interior of the building (Mater mortis, The Hunt, The Incident), paintings combining architecture with the figure (Hangmen, Torso, Execution, The Grand Inquisitor, The Big Bitch, Pillories).

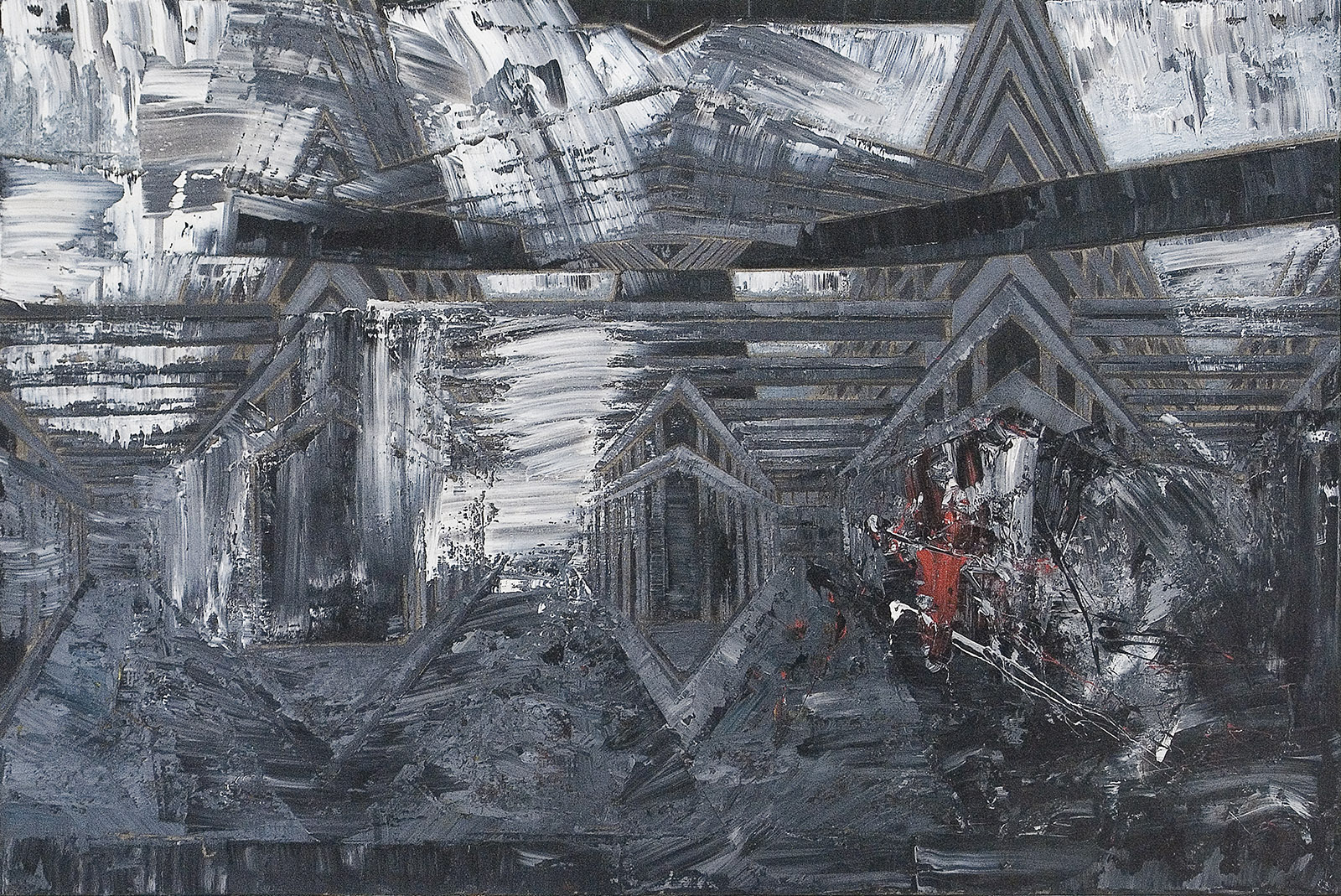
Skeleton (oil) 200 x 300 cm, 2010

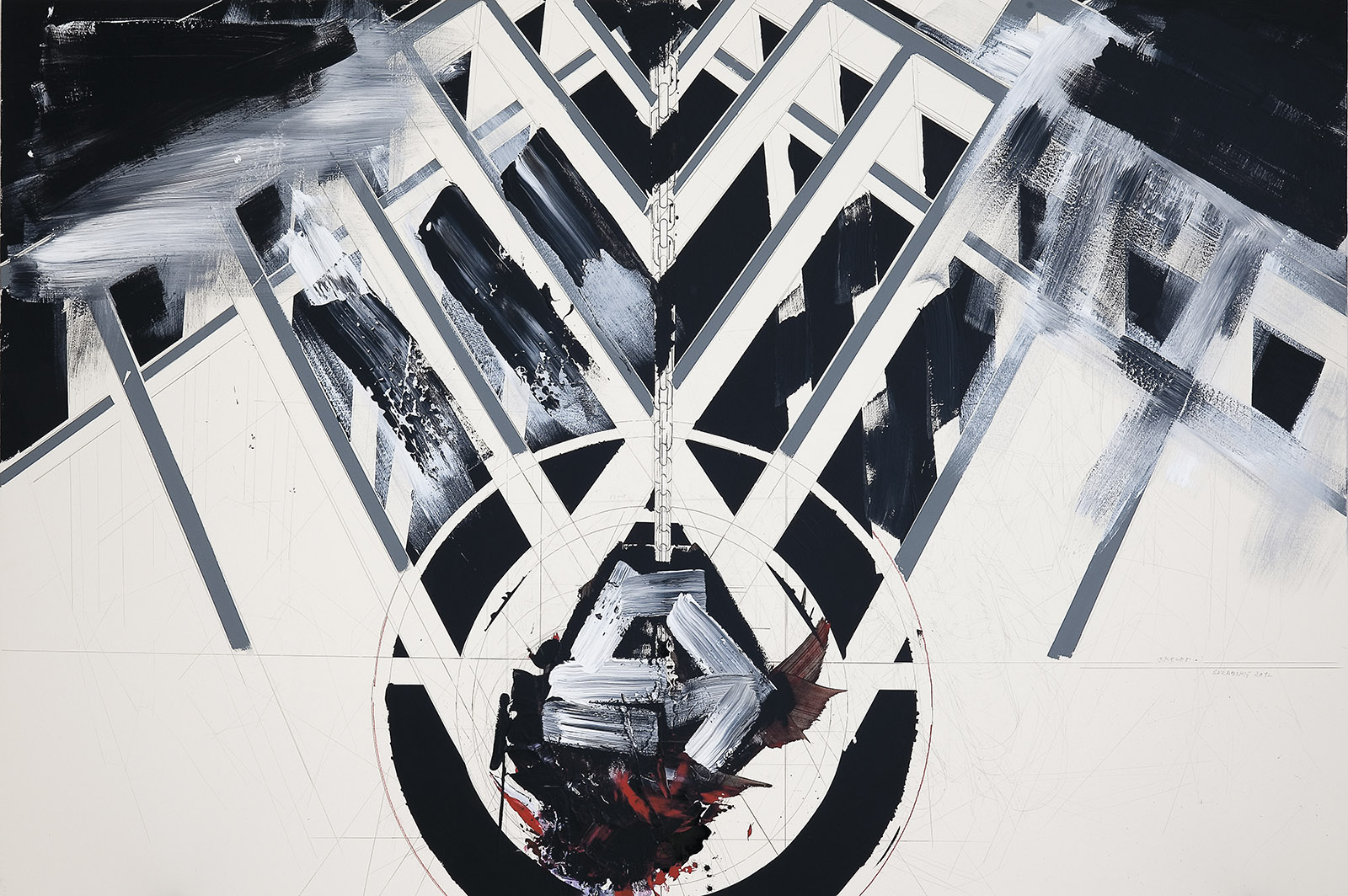
Skeleton (drawing, pencil, acryl) 160 x 240 cm, 2012

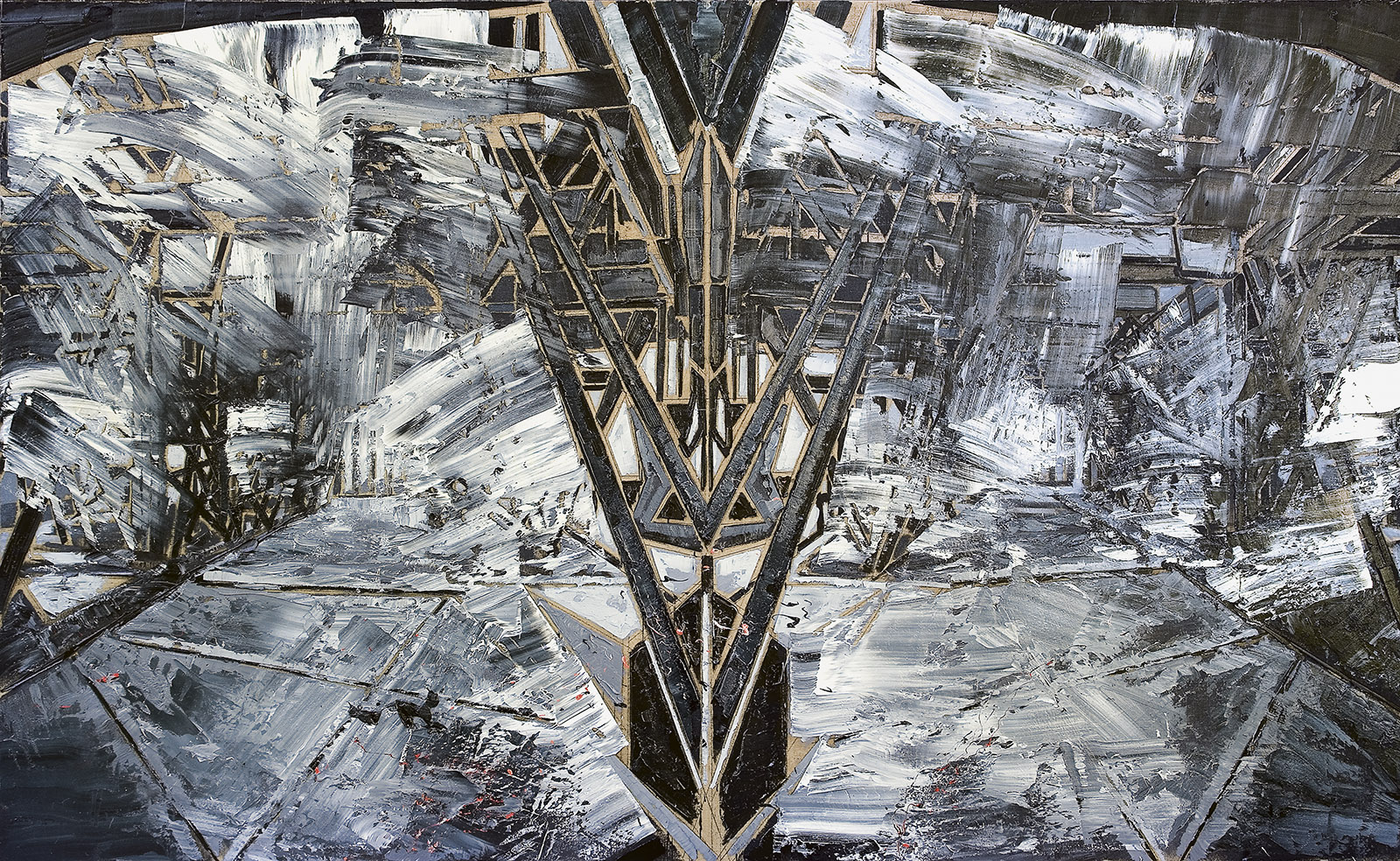
Skeleton (oil) 210 x 340 cm, 2013

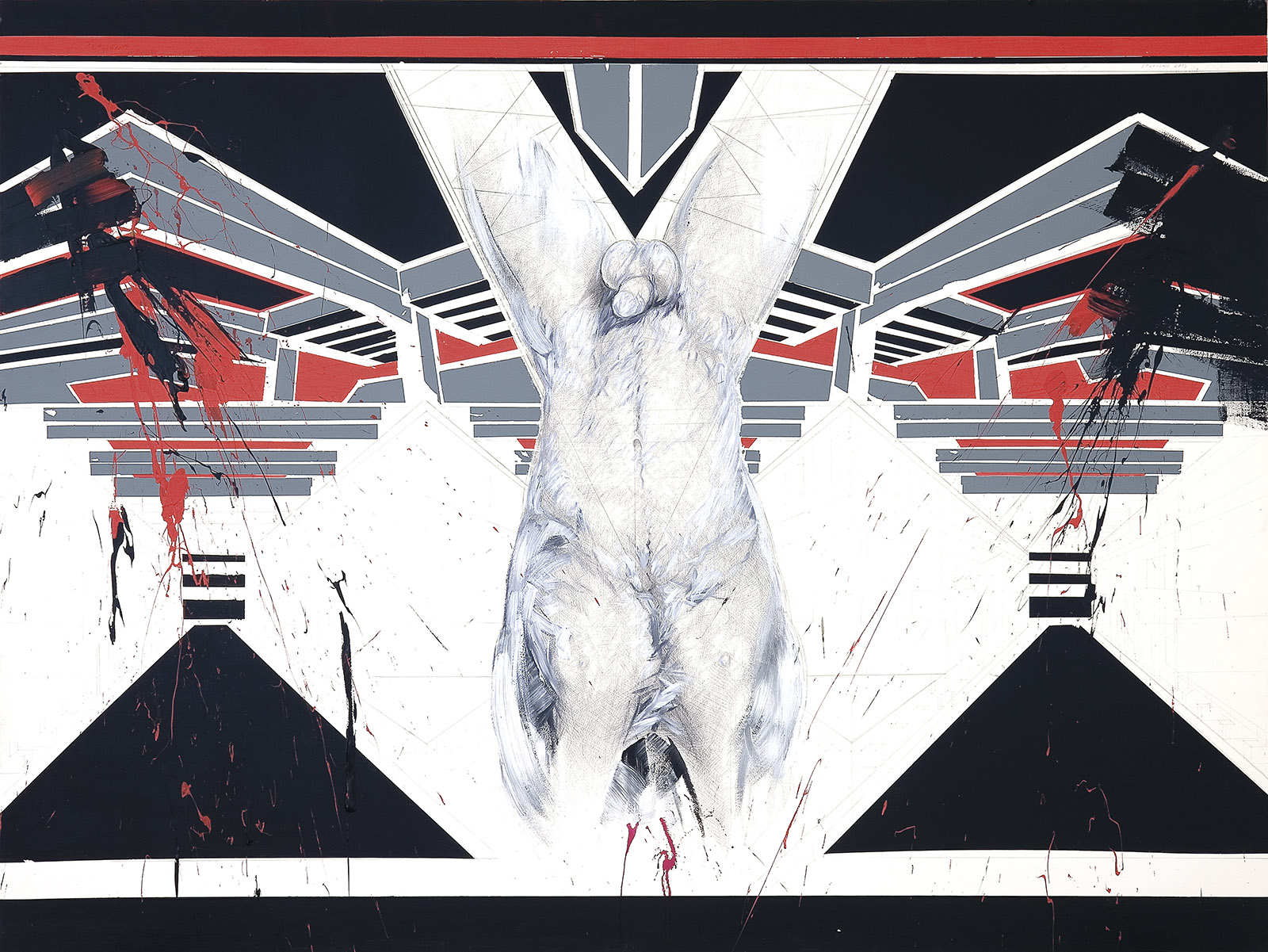
From the cycle Hanged Men (drawing, acryl) 160 x 240 cm, 2013–2014

In 2014–2015, he returned to the theme of Auschwitz once more and, based on photographic documentation, large-scale paintings of prison brick barracks and their interiors were created. The scheme of the extermination process, which is represented by a plaster model in the Auschwitz museum, was reflected by Sozanský in a series of drawings of naked bodies in the backdrop of the Auschwitz camp and bronze sculptures, where small figures give scale to the monstrous architecture (exhibited in Gallery of the Central Bohemian Region in 2015 under the title Extreme Situations).

Sozanský attempted to come to terms with the death of Jan Palach, which marked his entire generation, with the 2015 exhibition 1969 - The Year of the Break at the New Building of the National Museum and the Regional Museum in Litomyšl, a publication with texts by a number of personalities, and a video interview with Olbram Zoubek, who took off Jan Palach's postmortem mask. Sozanský treats the sacrifice of Jan Palach and Jan Zajíc with reverence, and his "residual record" of physical presence can be compared to the suffering symbolism of The Shroud of Turin or the human shadow carved into the stone steps by the atomic blast in Hiroshima. On the theme of Jan Palach, the National Theatre organized the performance Ice Age 2015 with a screening of Jiří Sozanský's works. (Note: Dramaturge Iva Klestilová, director Michal Dočekal. There was also a discussion with Olbram Zoubek, Vlasta Chramostova, Stanislav Milota and Petr Blažek. Petr Kofroň composed an original composition Palach.)

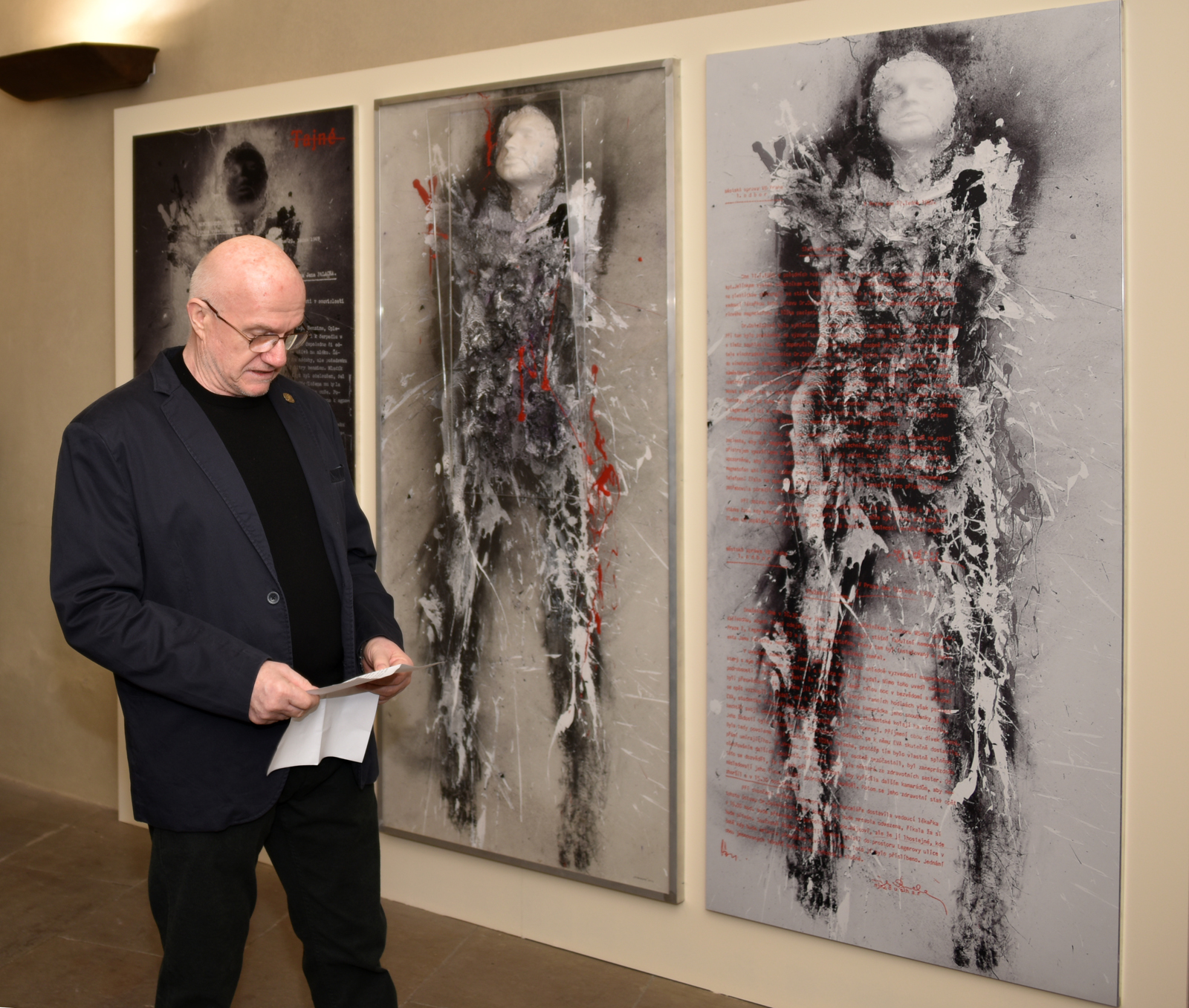
Jiří Sozanský and triptych Jan Palach - Ascension (2019), Karolinum

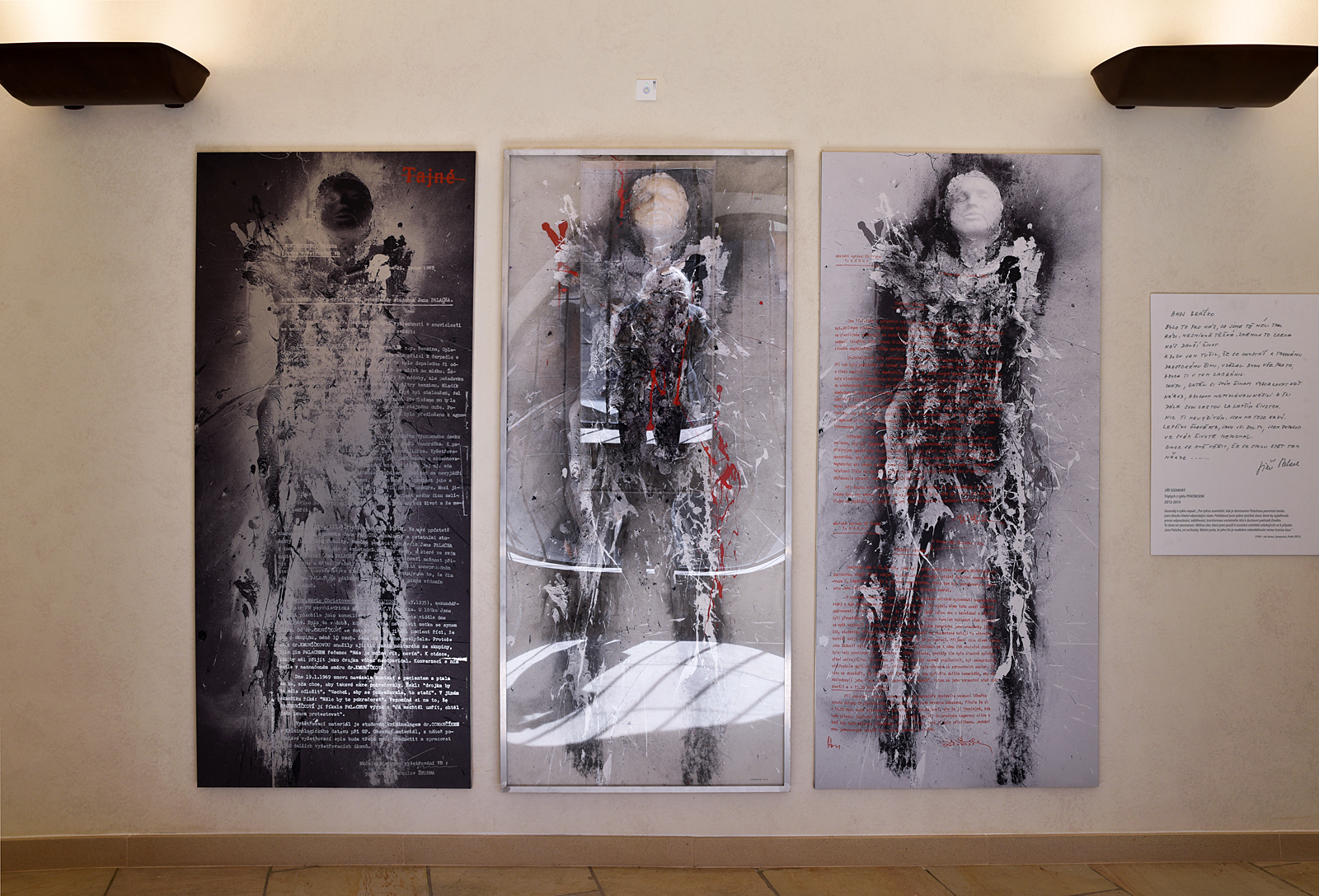
triptych Jan Palach - Ascension (2019), Karolinum

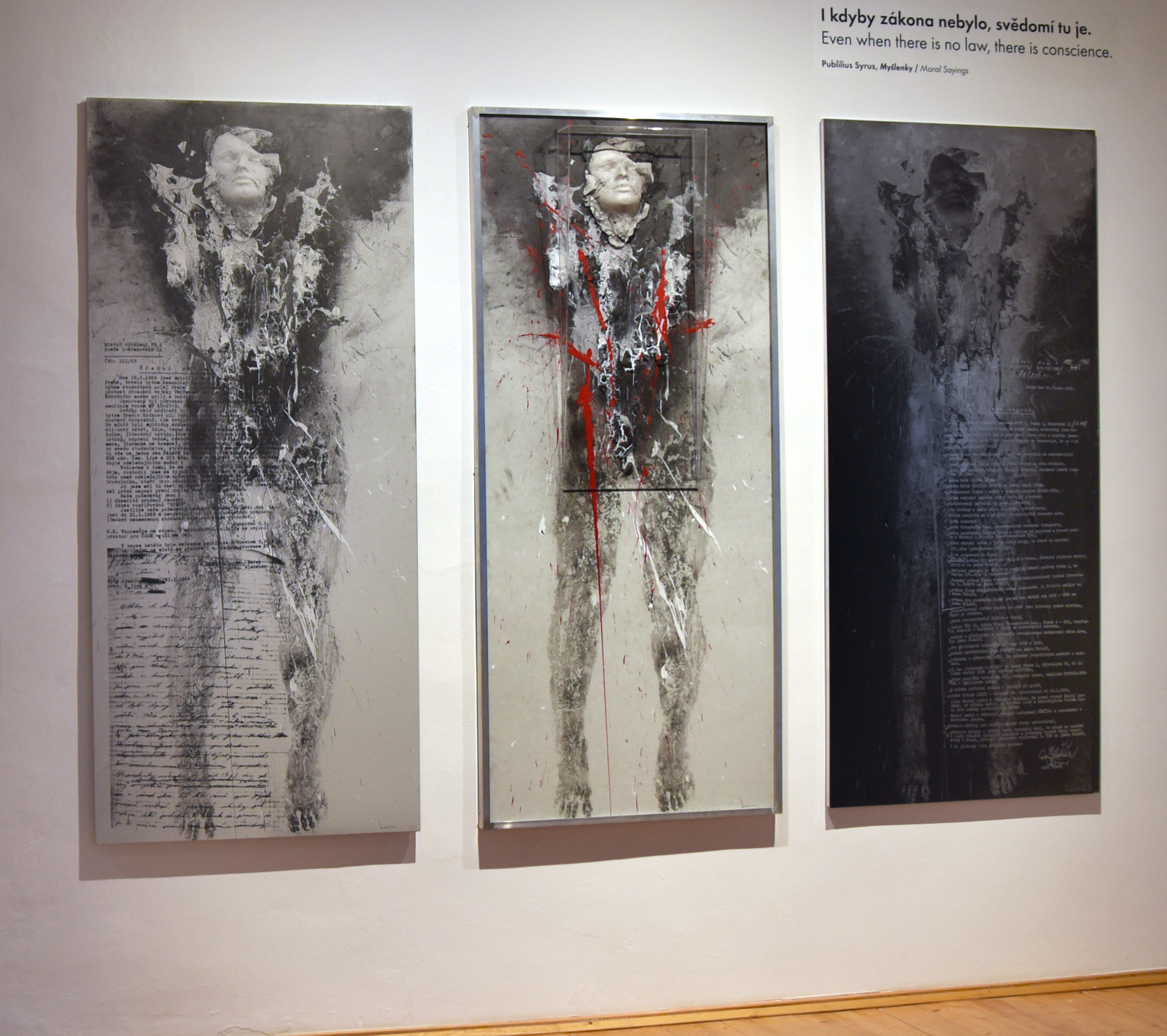
triptych Jan Palach - Ascension (2019), Gallery of the Central Bohemian Region in Kutná Hora

In 2018, the Gallery of the Central Bohemian Region (GASK) organized the balance exhibition Signum Actus / Place of the Act, which included Sozanský's works with similar themes, from the early graphic series Job (1972) to large-format paintings dedicated to Palach and Zajíc (cycles 16. 1. 1969, Place - dedicated to the concepts of the Palach memorial in his birthplace in Všetaty, Memorials, Locus actionis dedicated to Jan Zajíc). Sozanský's triptych Ascension, inspired by the sacrifice of Jan Palach and containing his death mask, was permanently installed in permanent exposition of GASK and in the corridor of Karolinum in 2019.

Sozanský's project House of Fear (2018) in Segovia in Spain borrows its title from a poem written by Jan Zahradníček during his imprisonment in Pankrác Prison. In addition to Zahradníček, the exhibition also commemorated Ivan Martin Jirous, Milada Horáková and Záviš Kalandra in the form of sculptures, photo collages and acrylic paintings and drawings combined with texts. A separate part of the exhibition were photo collages with authentic testimonies of Valdice prisoners from 1990.

Sozanský had been in contact with Václav Havel since 1984, but it was only after 2011, when he intensely felt the physical changes associated with old age, that he decided to create his portraits. The drawings, in which he incorporated Havel's texts, were based on photographic portraits by Alan Pajer and Oldřich Škácha.

For the 30th anniversary of the fall of communism, Sozanský prepared the balance exhibition Amnesia (2019–2020) at the Municipal House in Prague, where he commemorates important victims and prisoners of Nazism (K. Čapek, E. Filla), the 1950s (Zahradníček, Horáková, Kalandra, J. Stránský), the victims of the Soviet occupation (Palach, Zajíc) and the prisoners of the communist regime during normalization (Jirous, Gruntorád, Havel) as individuals who found themselves in extreme situation and represent a moral model that should not be forgotten. The theme of the exhibition was also related to his personal frustration with a society that has lost its original ethos of 1989 and has returned with its indifference to moral values to the stereotypes of behaviour that persisted from the normalization era. The portraits of Václav Havel were accompanied by texts and a separate display of a kind of reliquary with police portraits from investigation files and various prison personal possessions. Portraits of V. Havel were exhibited in 2012 at the Palace of Europe in Strasbourg, then at the Military History Institute Prague.

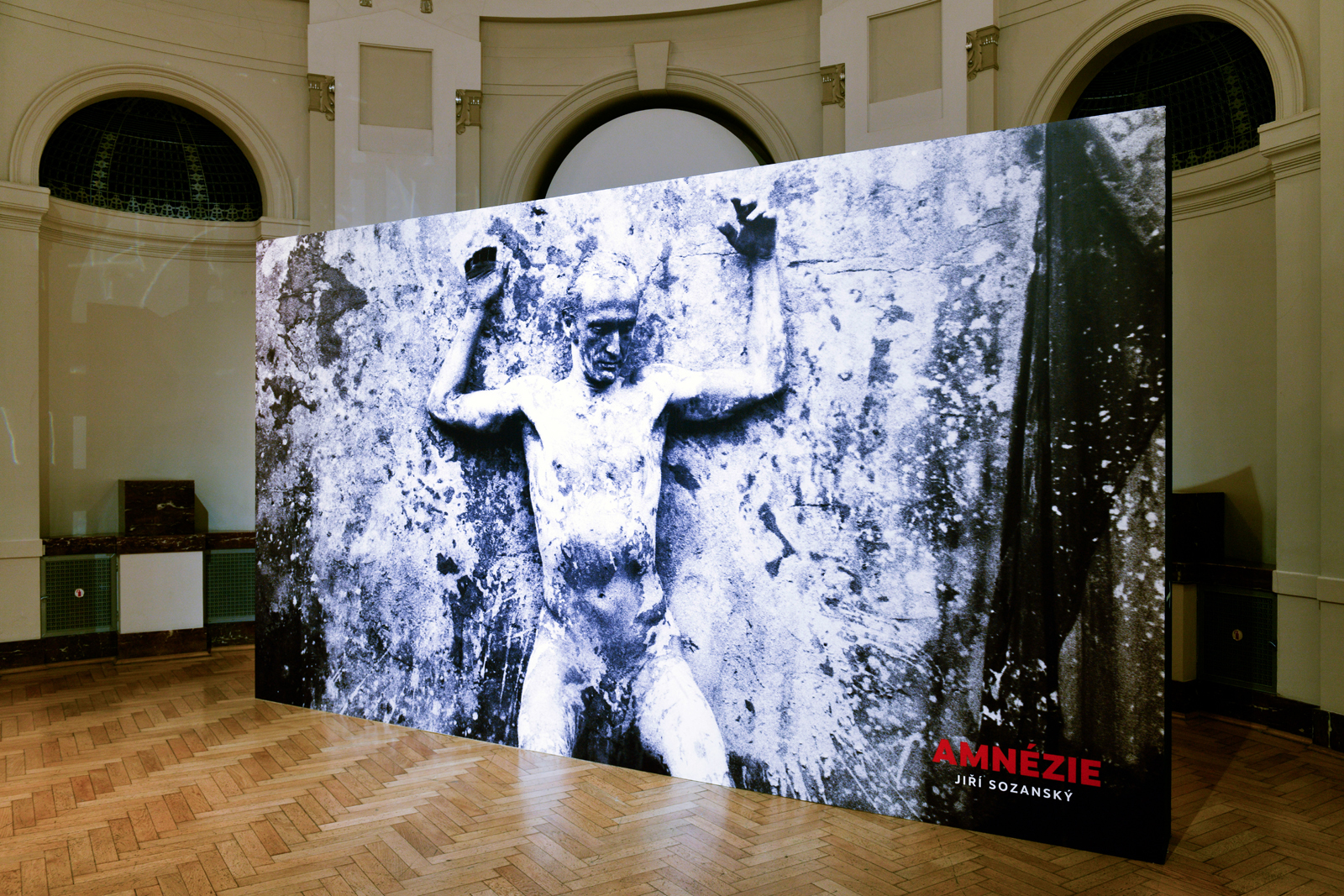
Jiří Sozanský – Amnesia, Municipal House (2019)

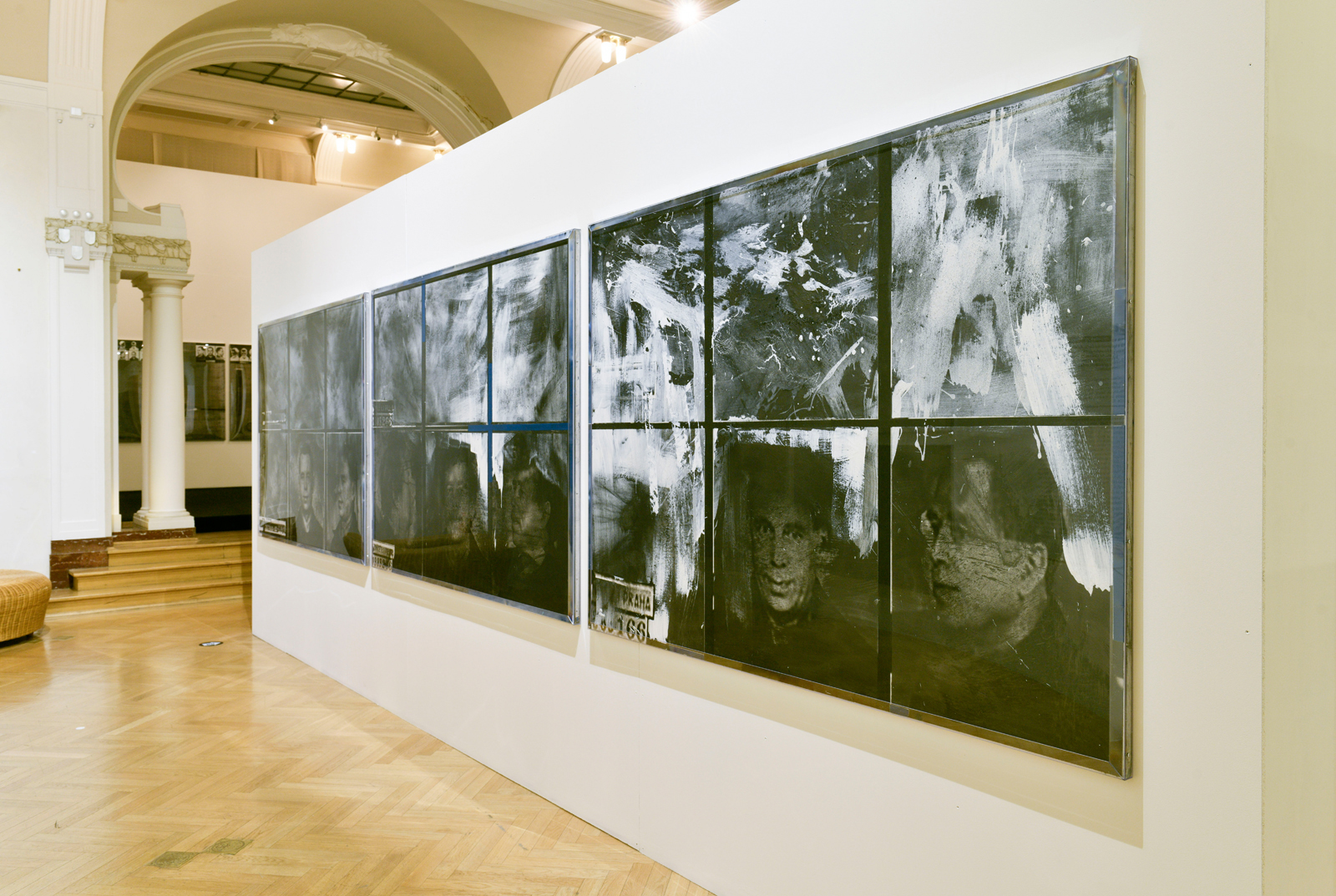
Amnesia, Municipal House (2019)

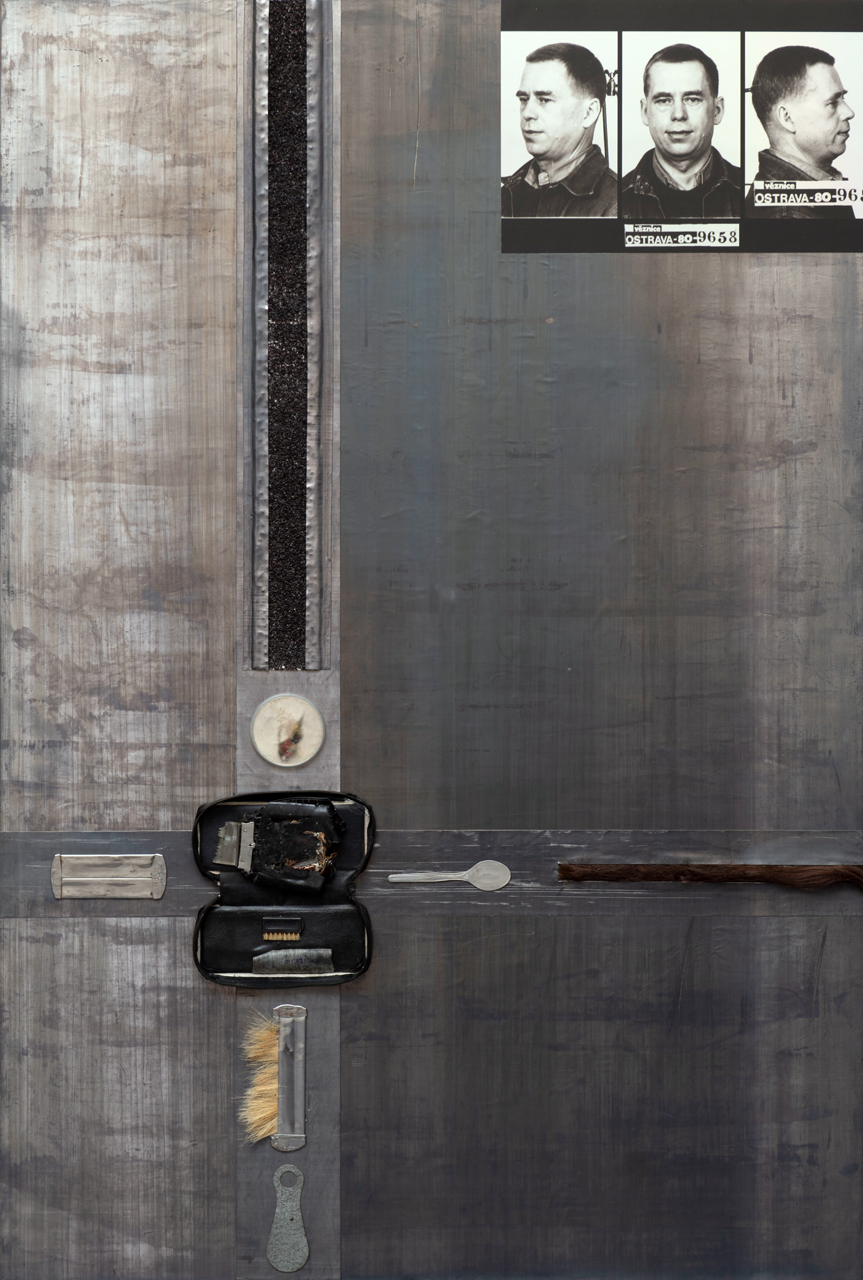
Václav Havel – Ostrava prison (2019)

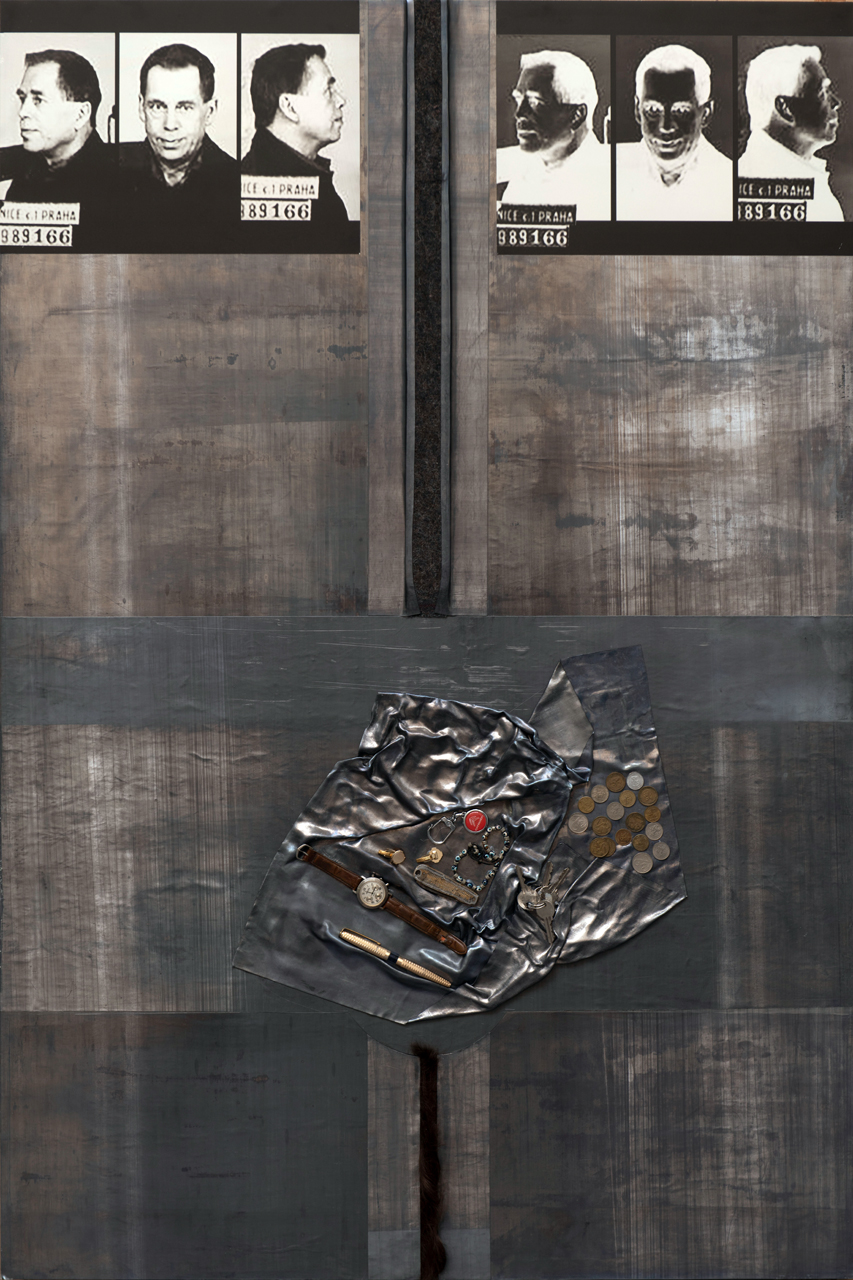
Václav Havel – Prague prison (2019)

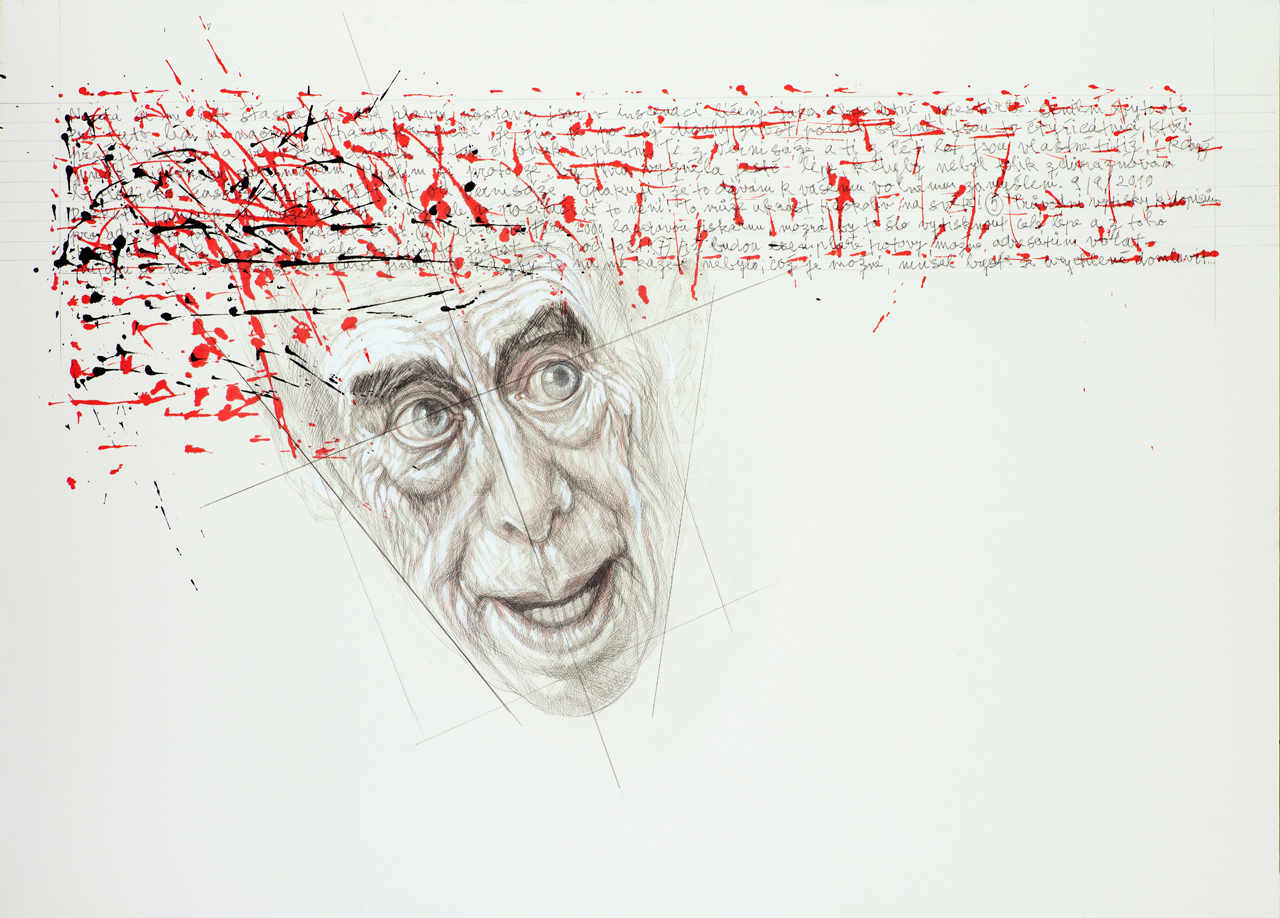
Václav Havel (2019)

In 2023, a bronze monument to the victims of the Soviet invasion of 1968, created by Jiří Sozanský, was unveiled at the Military Historical Institute in Prague. It bears the names of a total of 137 victims who died as a result of the invasion by the end of 1968. The monument will be installed as part of the reconstruction of Wenceslas Square between the old and new buildings of the National Museum. In 2024, Sozansky presented its second part, dedicated to the victims of the 1969 protests against the Soviet occupation. The complete memorial is temporarily located on the Vltava embankment in the vicinity of the Museum Kampa.

Jiří Sozanský's autobiographical account from 2021, entitled Post Scriptum, presents his life story and comments on his own work.

=== Work by technique ===
- Graphic cycles': Basement, Job, Pilgrim, Wrestling, From Dust and Ashes
- Cycles of drawings, paintings and collages: The Organism of the city, Days and Years of My Mother, Anatomy of an Industrial Landscape, The Body, On the Edge of the city, Skin, Incident, Escapes, Battlefield, The Fall, Metropolis, Hanged Men, Apocalypse, Kafileria, Scavengers, Rubble, Ghetto
- Video Projects': Escape ("Most 82"), Survive, There and Back, Massacre, Human Couple, House No.50 - Man JOB, Attempted Resurrection, Flood
- Thematic environmental projects, installations, art projects': The Process, Evacuation (Most 1981/1982), Panic, House No. 50 ( Individual Eating, Family Psychotherapy, Convalescents, Bedroom, Attributes of Love, Mirror of Solitude, Visitors, Incident, Big Laundry), Fortress (Terezín), Containers, Closed, Report from 3. Ward, Homage to Jan Zahradníček, Karlín Zone A, From Dust and Ashes, Confined in the Body, The Twenty-Seventh Day, Skeletons, 1984 - The Year of Orwell, Extreme Situations, The Zone, Homage to Jan Palach, Amnesia

=== Sculptures in public space ===
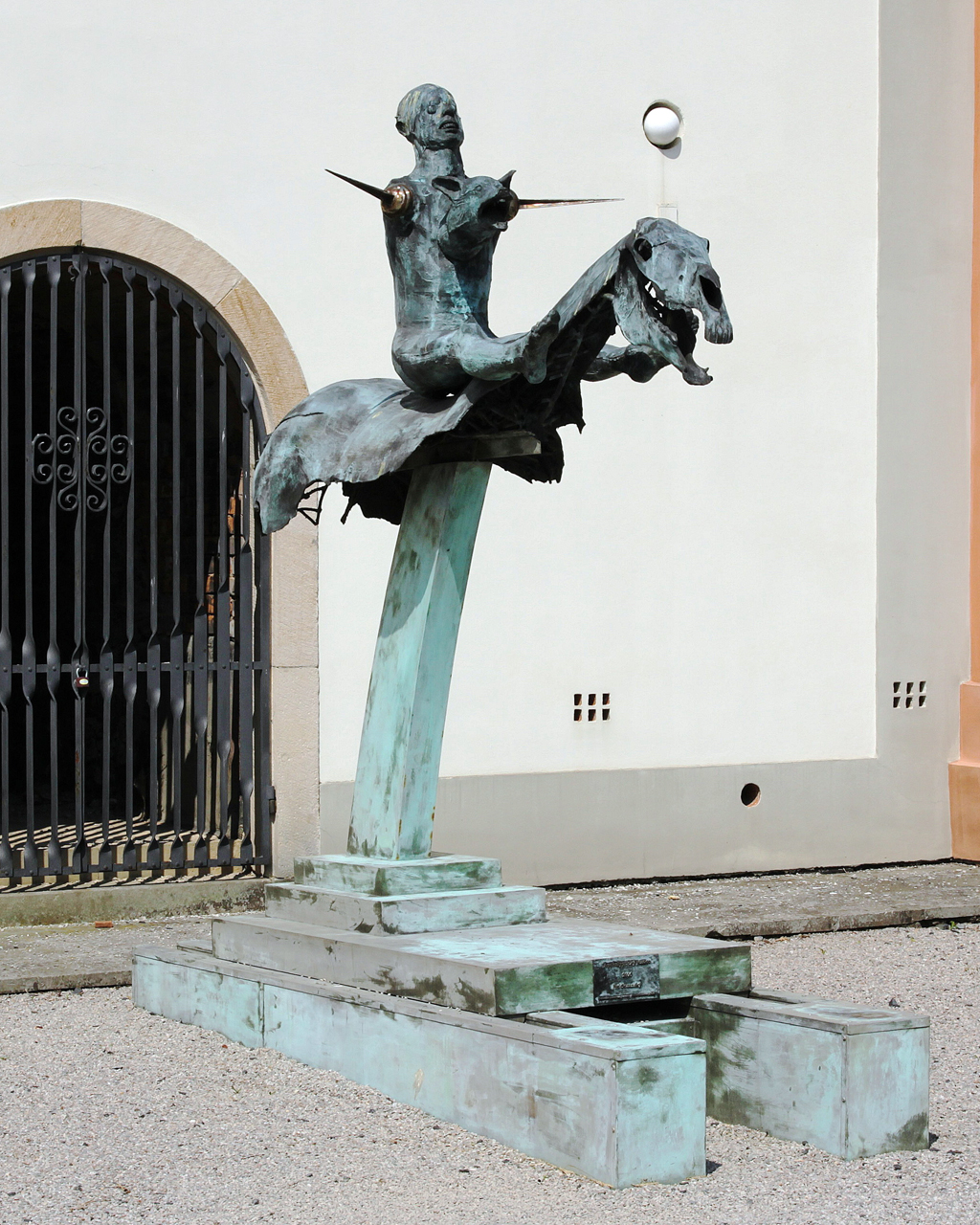
Apokalyptic Horseman (2006), damaged

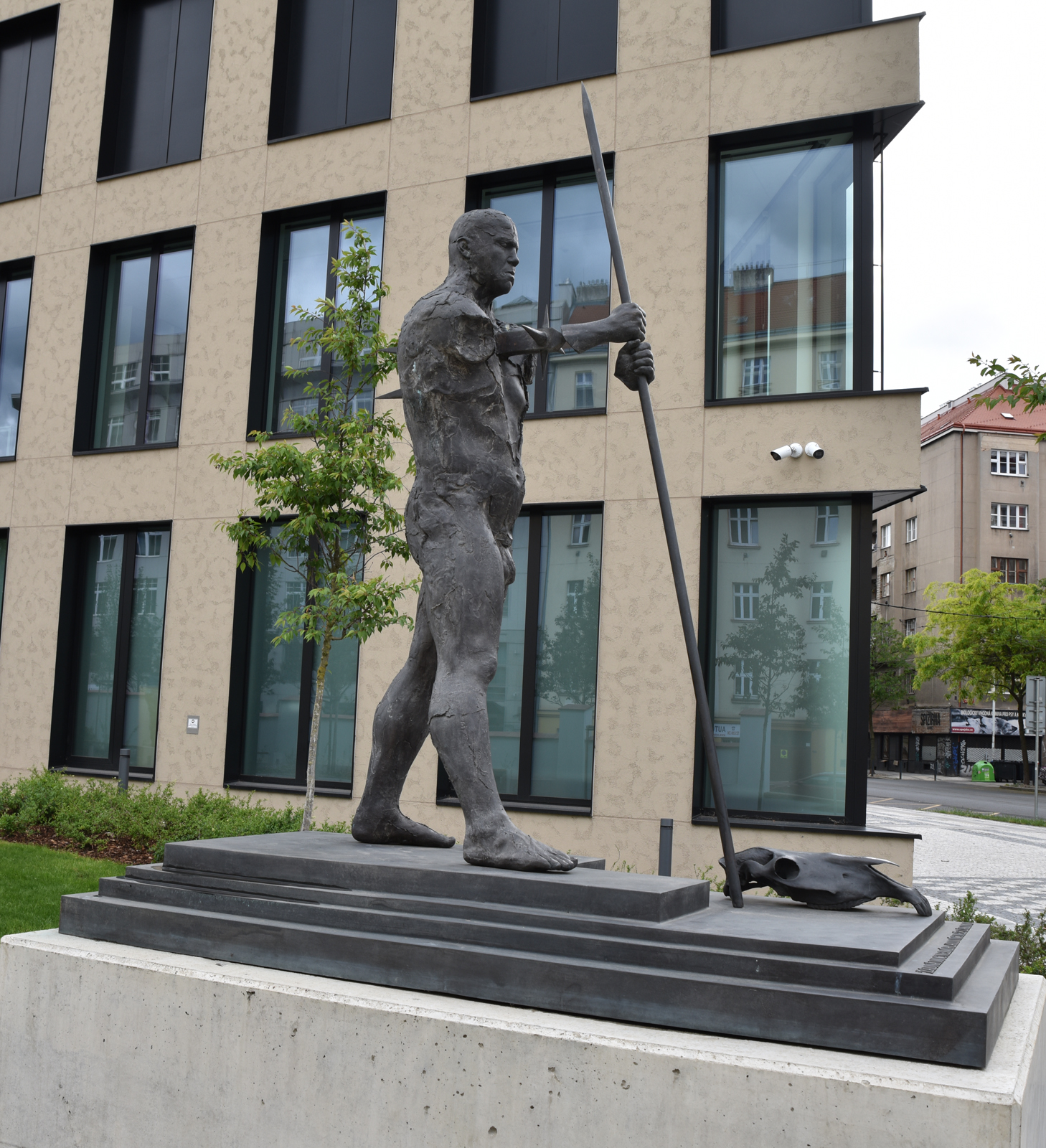
The Guardian (2008)

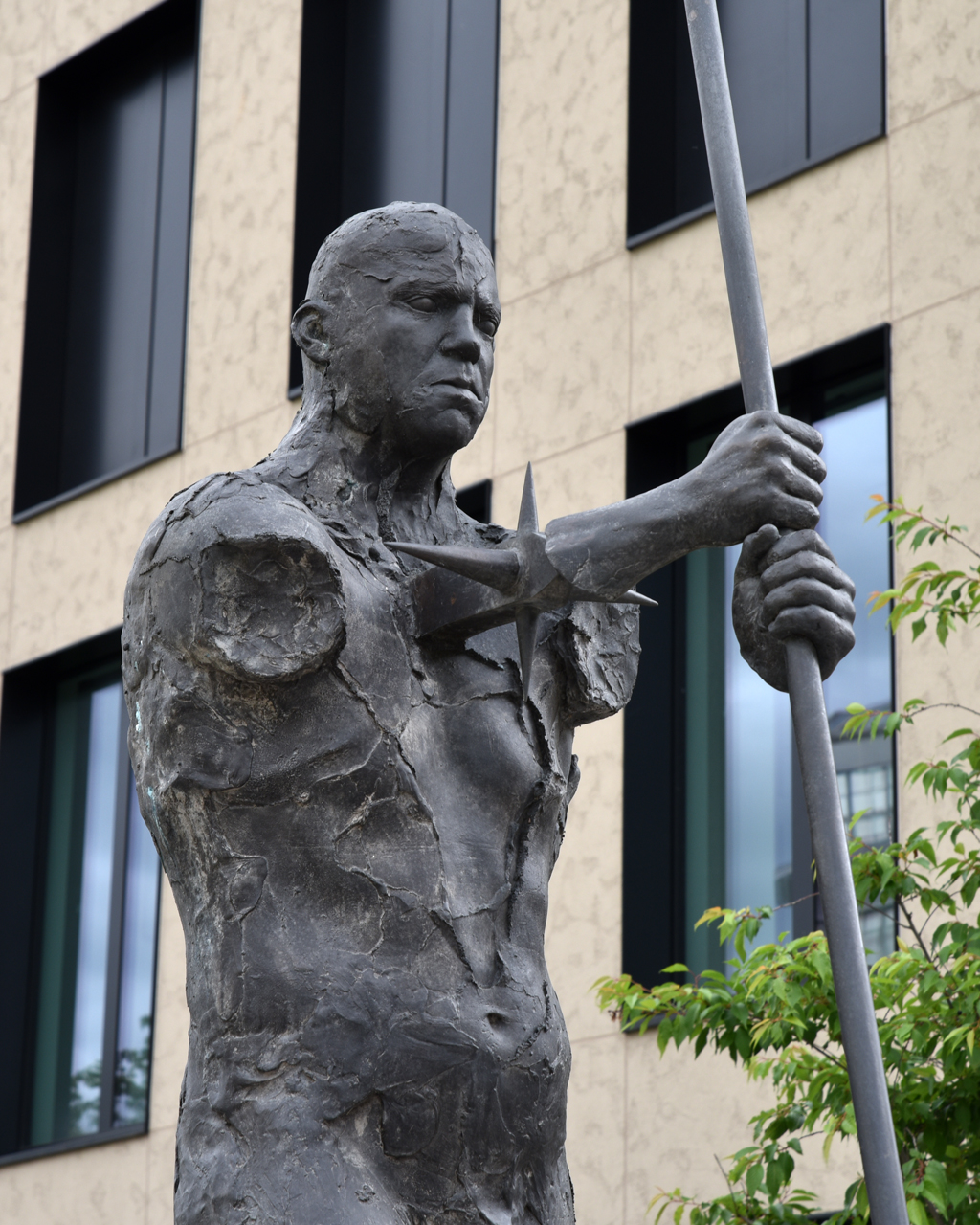
The Guardian (2008), detail

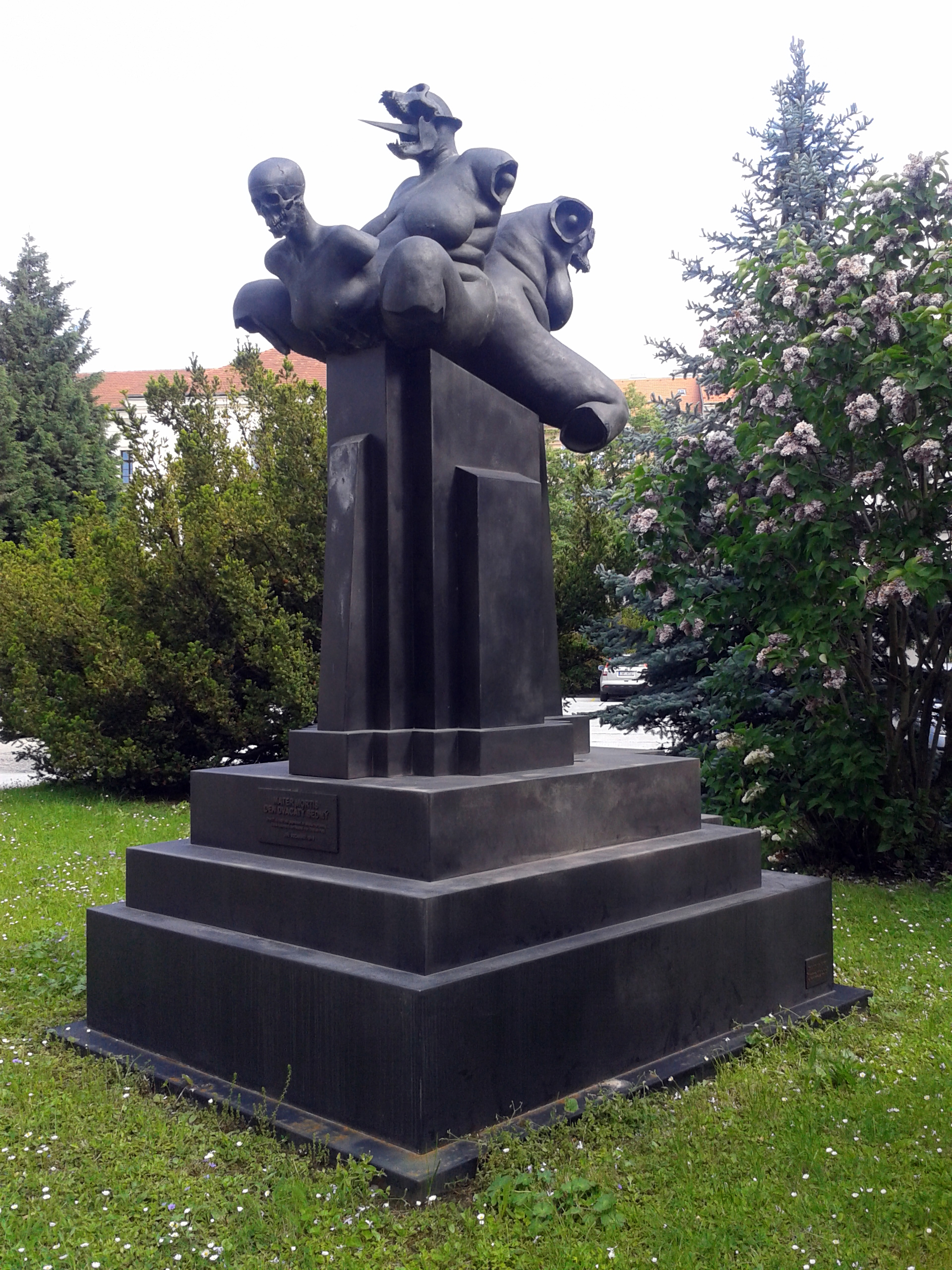
Mater Mortis (2010)

=== Monuments and memorials ===
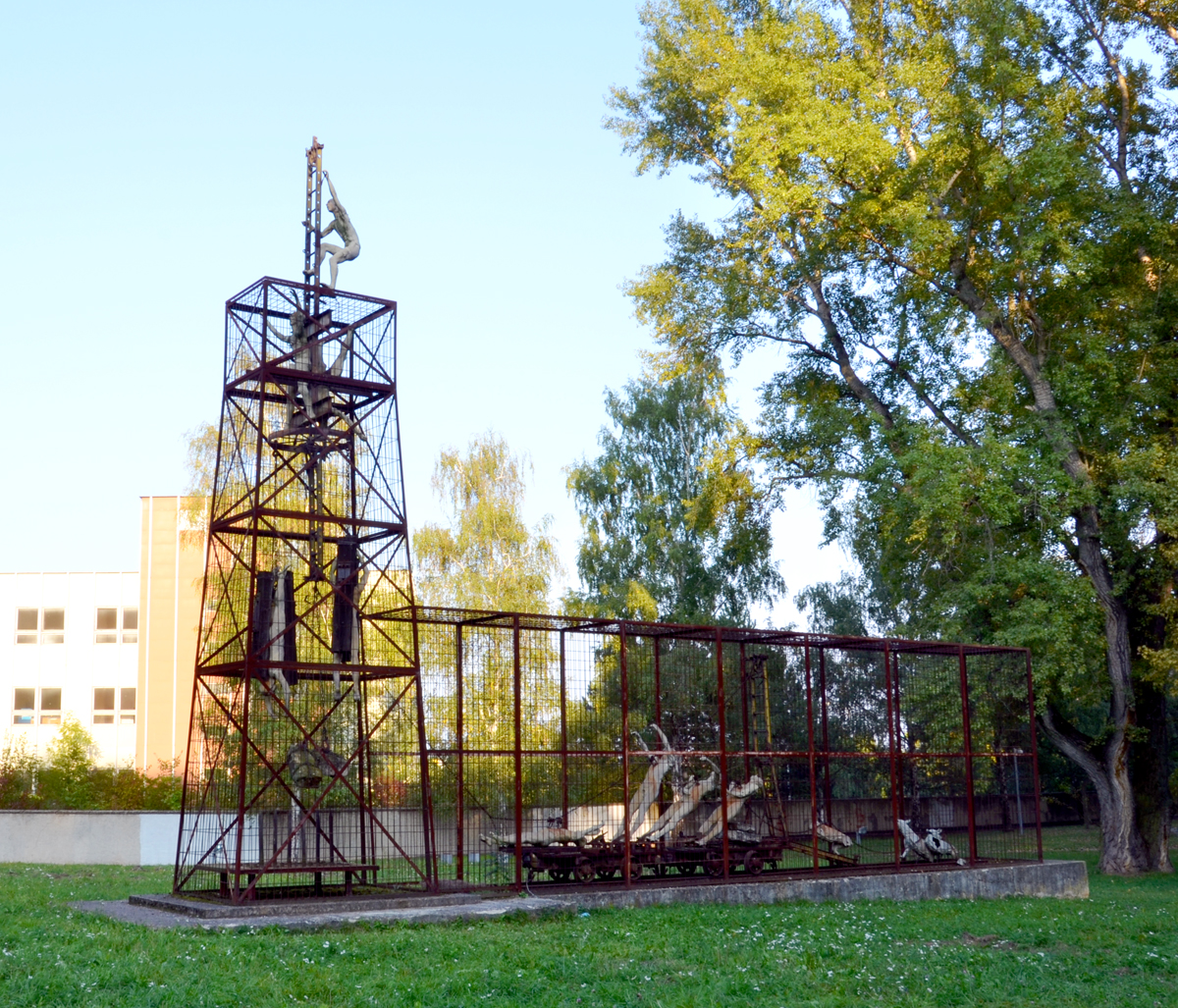
Memento mori, Richard Crematorium, Litoměřice 1992 (damaged by vandals and deinstalled in 2018)

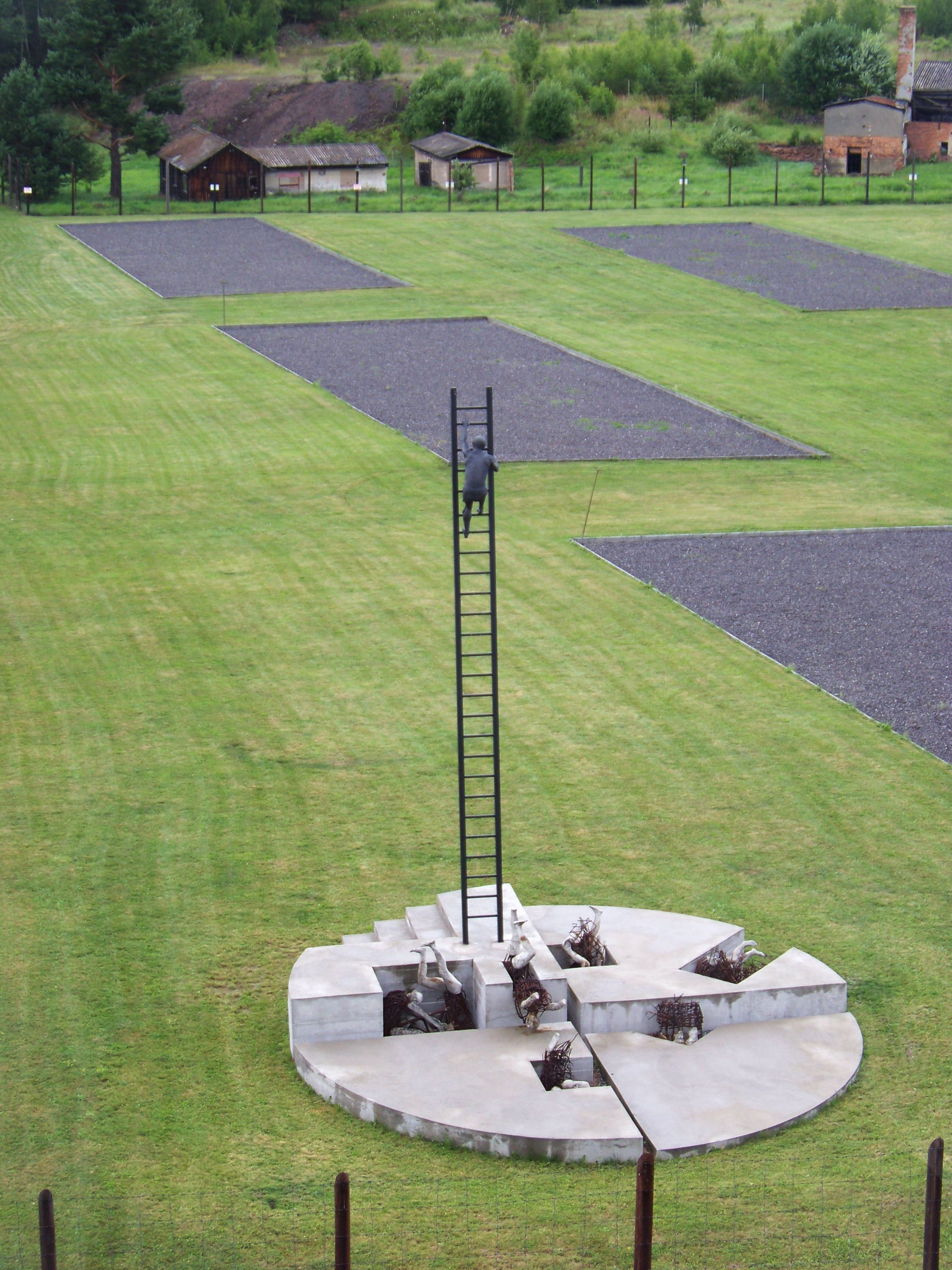
Memorial to the victims of communism, former labour camp Vojna near Příbram uranium mines (2010)

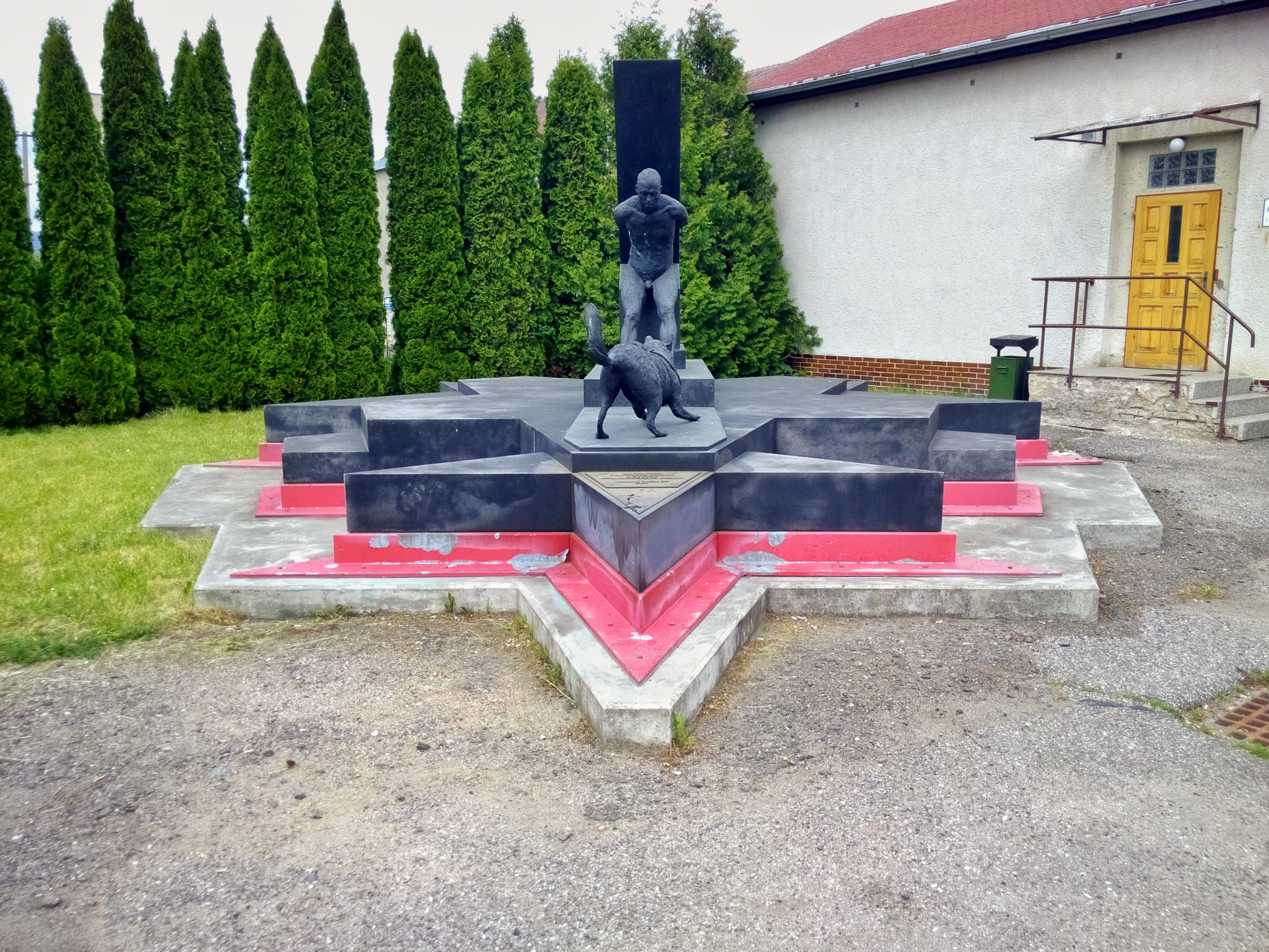
Monument to political prisoners in Valdice (2017)

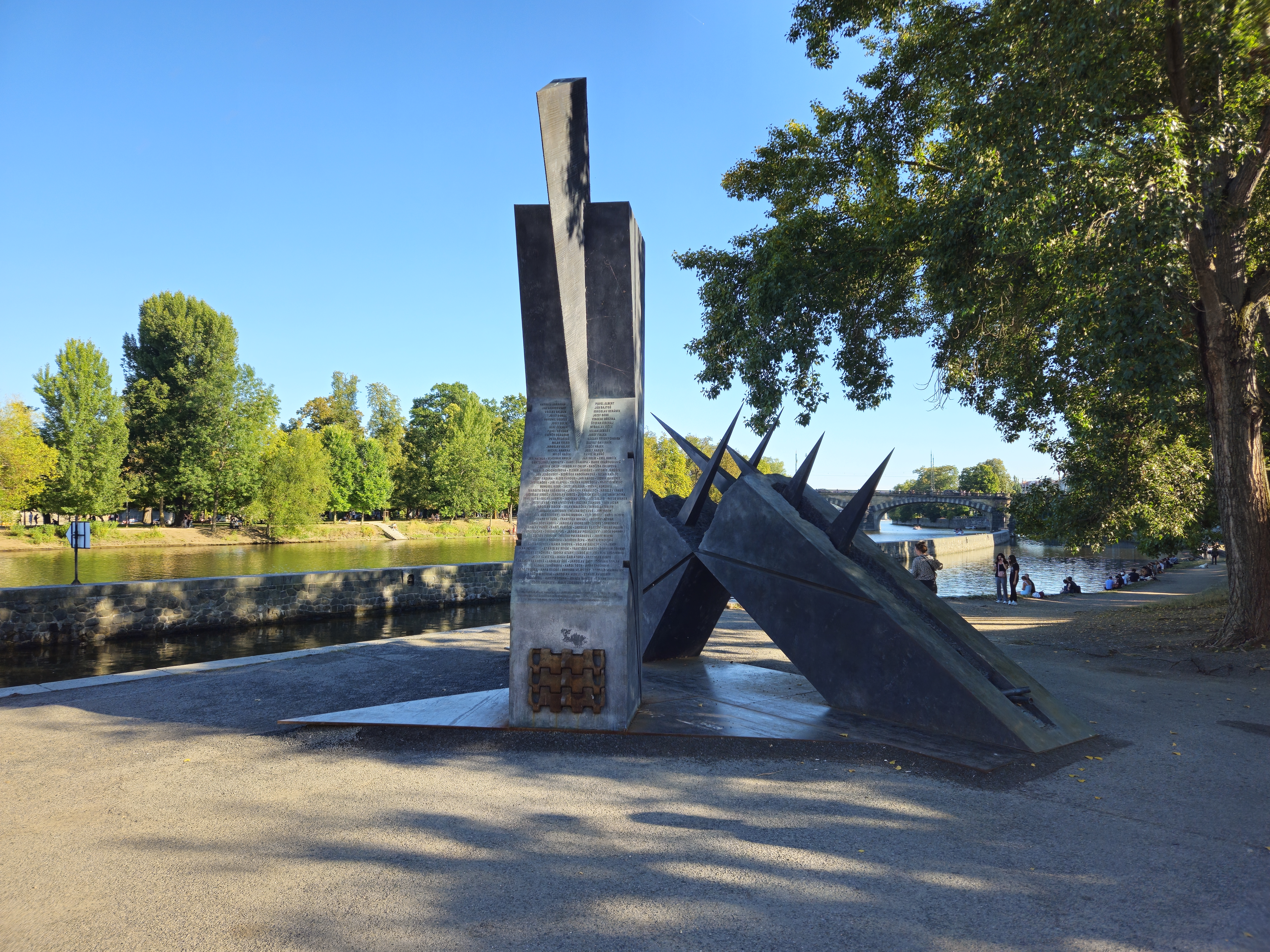
Monument to the victims of the 1968 occupation and the 1969 protests (2024)

=== Collections ===
- National Gallery Prague
- Moravian Gallery in Brno
- Terezín Memorial
- Museum Kampa
- Centre Georges Pompidou Paris
- Musée d'art et d'histoire de Saint-Denis, Paris
- Musée d'art moderne de la Ville de Paris
- Helsinki City Museum
- National Gallery of Bosnia and Herzegovina, Sarajevo
- Aleš South Bohemian Gallery in Hluboká nad Vltavou
- Regional Gallery Liberec
- Gallery of Central Bohemian Region in Kutná Hora (formerly Czech Museum of Fine Arts in Prague)
- Regional Gallery of the Highlands in Jihlava
- Gallery of Modern Art in Hradec Králové
- Museum of Art Olomouc
- Benedikt Rejt Gallery Louny
- North Bohemian Art Gallery in Litoměřice
- Gallery of Modern Art in Roudnice nad Labem
- Art Gallery Karlovy Vary
- Gallery Klatovy / Klenová
- private collections at home and abroad

=== Exhibitions (selection) ===
- 1976 Jiří Sozanský, Terezín Memorial
- 1985 Jiří Sozanský: Drawings, Regional Gallery Liberec
- 1986/1987 Jiří Sozanský, Opatov Gallery, Prague, Na perch Gallery, Brno, Small Scene, České Budějovice
- 1987 Jiří Sozanský: House No. 50, Gallery 55, Kladno
- 1988 Jiří Sozanský: Graphic Cycles, Microbiological Institute of the Czechoslovak Academy of Sciences, Prague
- 1989 Jiří Sozanský: 1970-1989, People's House in Vysočany, Prague
- 1990 Jiří Sozanský: Report from Ward 3, Valdice Prison
- 1991 Jiří Sozanský: Paintings, Nová síň Gallery, Prague
- 1991 Jiří Sozanský: Drawings, Litera Gallery, Prague
- 1993 Jiří Sozanský: The Theme of the Bible (1st exhibition of the series The Big Theme), Galerie Litera, Prague
- 1994 Jiří Sozanský: From Dust and Ashes, Military History Museum, Prague
- 1994 Jiří Sozanský: Graphics, University Gallery, Plzeň
- 1995 Jiří Sozanský: Forum Populi, Vyšehrad, Gorlice, Prague
- 1996 Jiří Sozanský: Sarajevo, Litera Gallery, Prague
- 1996 Jiří Sozanský: Exodus, Vyšehrad, Gorlice, Prague
- 1996 Jiří Sozanský: Homage to Sarajevo, Part I, Gallery of Czech Culture, Český Krumlov
- 1999 Jiří Sozanský: Toward the sources of inspiration, drawing and graphic works by Jiří Sozanský, E Gallery, Žirovnice, Šternberský Palace, Prague
- 1999 Jiří Sozanský: Drawings, gouaches, prints, Millennium Gallery, Prague
- 1999 Jiří Sozanský: The Theme of the Bible, Litera Gallery, Prague
- 2001 Jiří Sozanský: Stone and Bone, Symposion, Prague
- 2001 Jiří Sozanský: Drawings & prints, Millennium Gallery, Praha
- 2001 Jiří Sozanský: Homage to Jan Zahradníček, Hollar Gallery, Prague
- 2005 Jiří Sozanský: Zone, Mánes Exhibition Hall, Prague
- 2005 Jiří Sozanský: Theme of Job, North Bohemian Gallery of Fine Arts in Litoměřice
- 2005 Jiří Sozanský: From Dust and Ashes - Collages, Prints, Old Town Hall, Prague
- 2006 Jiří Sozanský: Graphics, Magna Gallery, Ostrava
- 2009 Jiří Sozanský: Rubble, Municipal House, Prague
- 2009 Jiří Sozanský, Museum of the Police of the Czech Republic, Prague
- 2010 Jiří Sozanský: Skeletons, Museum Kampa, Prague
- 2010 Jiří Sozanský: Day Twenty Seven, Museum of the Police of the Czech Republic, Prague
- 2011 Jiří Sozanský: Metropolis, Prague City Museum
- 2014 Jiří Sozanský: 1984 - The Year of Orwell, National Gallery Prague
- 2015 Jiří Sozanský: Extreme situations, Gallery of the Central Bohemian Region in Kutná Hora
- 2016 Jiří Sozanský: 1969 The Year of the Break, New Building of the National Museum, Prague
- 2018 Jiří Sozanský: House of Fear / La casa miedo, former Segovia Prison, Spain
- 2019, Jiri Sozansky: Amnesia, Municipal House, Prague

==== Collective ====
For details see abART: Jiří Sozanský: Collective Exhibitions

== Decorations ==
Awarded by Czech Republic

- Medal of Merit (2024)

== Sources ==
- Olga Sozanská (ed.), Jiří Sozanský: Postscriptum, 371 s., Symposion, Museum 20. stol., nakl. Fra, Praha 2021, ISBN 978-80-904962-8-6
- Jiří Sozanský, Marek Jodas (eds.), Symposion, 216 s., Praha 2019, ISBN 978-80-904962-7-9
- Jiří Sozanský: Amnézie / Amnesia, 256 s., Symposion 2019, ISBN 978-80-904962-6-2
- Jiří Sozanský, Dům strach / La casa miedo, 112 s., Symposion 2018, ISBN 978-80-904962-5-5
- Jan Munk, 70 let Památníku Terezín / 70 years of the Terezín Memorial, OSWALD 2017, ISBN 978-80-87242-29-2
- Jiří Sozanský: 1969 – rok zlomu / 1969 - Year of Break, 292 s., Symposion, 2015, ISBN 978-80-904962-4-8
- Jiří Sozanský, Mezní situace / Extreme Situations, Symposion, Prague 2015, ISBN 978-80-904962-3-1
- Jiří Sozanský, 1984 – Rok Orwella / 1984 - Year of Orwell, Symposion, Prague 2014, ISBN 978-80-904962-2-4
- Jiří Sozanský, Zóna / Zone, Kant Publishing, Prague 2013, ISBN 978-80-7437-108-0
- Olga Sozanská, Bohumila Křížová (eds.), Ekecheiriá, Symposion 2012, ISBN 978-80904962-1-7
- Olga Sozanská (ed.), Den dvacátý sedmý / Twenty-seventh Day, Symposion 2010, ISBN 978-80-254-7397-9
- Sandra Průša (ed.), Jiří Sozanský: Skelety / Skeletons, Museum Kampa, Prague 2010, ISBN 978-80-87344-04-0
- Brabec, J. et al.: Jiří Sozanský, Sutiny / Rubble (plastiky, grafiky, obrazy, koláže), 54 p., katalog k výstavě v Obecním domě v Praze 2009, Symposion 2009, ISBN 978-80-254-5551-7
- Olga Sozanská (ed.), Koloseum. Vítězové a poražení / Colosseum. Vinners and Defeated, Symposion 2008, ISBN 978-80-254-3388-1
- Jiří Sozanský et al., Monology / Monologues 1971-2006, 214 s., Prostor, 2006, ISBN 80-239-7079-8
- Jiří T. Kotalík, Téma Job z díla Jiřího Sozanského / Theme Job in the works of Jiří Sozanský, North Bohemian Gallery of Art 2005, ISBN 80-85090-62-7
- Marie Langerová (ed.), Praha Karlín Zóna A, 102 p., Symposion 2004, ISBN 80-239-3172-5
- I. Málková, J. Sozanský, Hledání Viléma Závady, 286 p., Votobia, 2003, ISBN 80-7220-153-0
- Olga Sozanská (ed.), Kámen a kost. Pocta Janu Zahradníčkovi / Stone and Bone. Hommage to Jan Zahradníček, Symposion, Prague 2001
- Jiří Sozanský, K pramenům inspirace, 40 p., National Gallery Prague 2000
- Jiří Sozanský, Jiří Tichý, Pevnost / Fortress, Czech Ministry of Culture 1991
- Jiří Tichý, Proti zdi / Against the Wall, 68 p., Agentura EWA 1991
- Olga Sozanská (ed.), Zpráva ze 3. oddělení / Report from the 3rd department, Czech Ministry of Culture 1991, ISBN 80-900175-2-5
- Eva Petrová: Jiří Sozanský, Obrazy / Paintings, Unie výtvarných umělců 1991, ISBN 80-900175-4-1
- Jiří Kotalík, Oto Kraus, Jiří Sozanský: Jiří Sozanský 1970–1989, unpaginated, ONV Praha 9, 1989
- Jan Kříž: Jiří Sozanský, Kresby / Drawings, Galerie Na bidýlku, Brno 1986
- Terezín '80, col. catalogue, Terezín Memorial 1980
