= Mravec =

Mravec (feminine: Mravcová) is a Slovak surname. Notable people with this surname include:

- Dušan Mravec (born 1980), Slovak painter
- Katrin Lengyelová née Mravcová (born 1972), Slovak journalist
- Michal Mravec (born 1987), Slovak footballer
