= Jan Mikulka =

Czech painter

Acad. painter Jan Mikulka
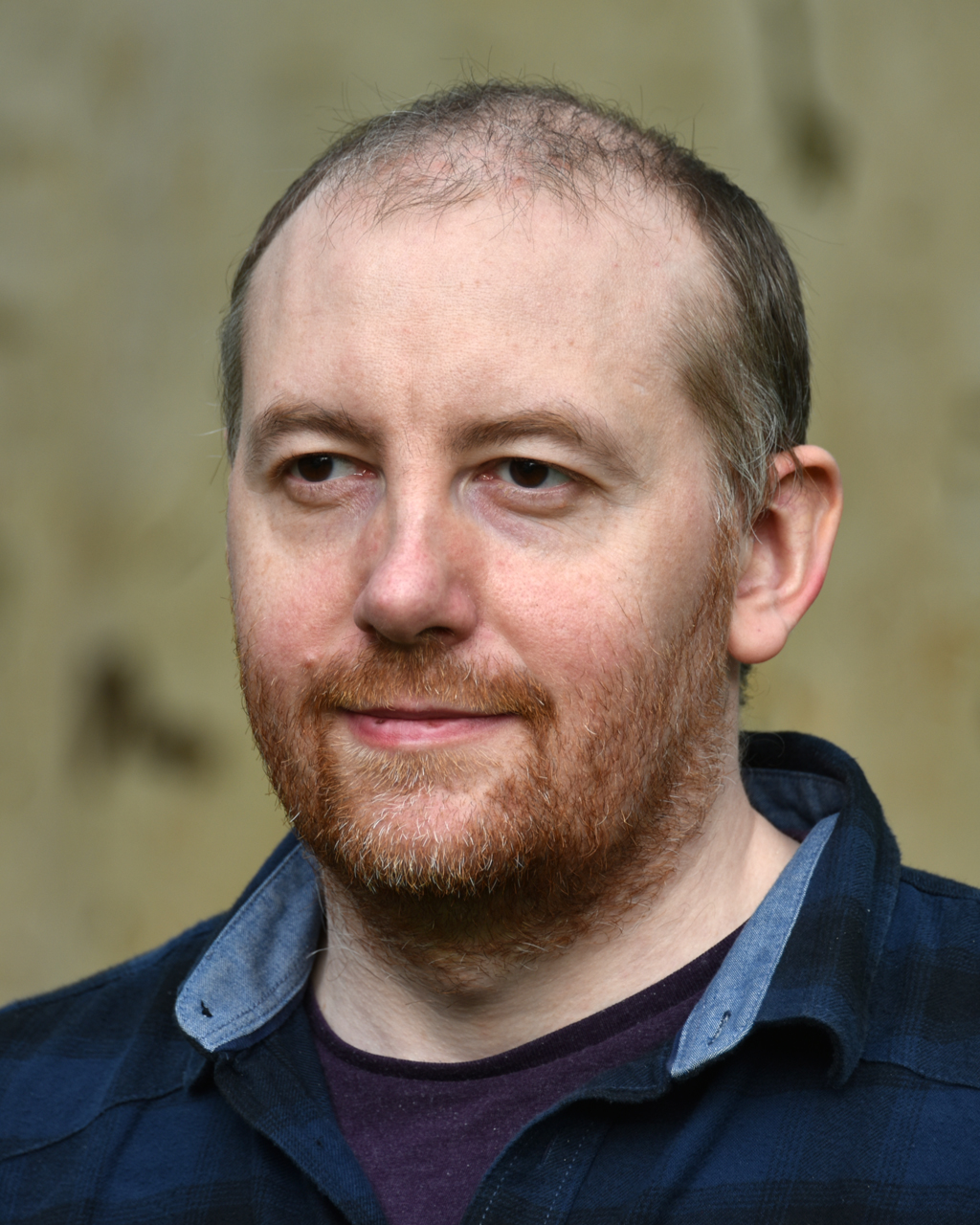
- Jan Mikulka in 2019
- Born: 4 April 1980 (age 46); Prague, Czechoslovakia
- Education: Academy of Fine Arts, Prague
- Known for: painter
- Style: hyperrealism
- Awards: BP Portrait Award, The Royal Society of Portrait Painters, London (2011), SELF Portrait Prize, The Royal Society of Portrait Painters, London (2013), The Changing Faces Prize, The Royal Society of Portrait Painters, London (2016)
- Website: https://www.janmikulka.com/bio/

Jan Mikulka (born 4 April 1980) is a Czech painter. He is known for his still-life painting and figurative and portrait work. In 2011, he won the Visitors's Choice BP Portrait Award in the National Portrait Gallery competition. He has twice succeeded in the international competition announced by the Royal Society of Portrait Painters in London, a showcase of contemporary portraiture. In 2013, he won the first prize for a self-portrait (SELF Portrait Prize, 2013), and in 2016 The Changing Faces Prize, also awarded by the Royal Society of Portrait Painters.

== Life ==
Mikulka was born on 4 April 1980 in Prague. During his second year of high school, he took up ceramics and attended afternoon figure drawing classes at the School of Arts and Crafts, taught by sculptor Vojtěch Adamec. He decided not to continue his studies at the high school and passed the entrance examination for the subject of woodcarving and wood shaping at the Higher Vocational School of Arts and Crafts in Prague (1996-2000). From there, he was admitted to the Academy of Fine Arts in Prague in 2000, to the Studio of Classical Painting Techniques of Prof. Zdeněk Beran at the Academy of Fine Arts in Prague, from which he graduated in 2006.

As a student at the Academy, he presented his works at the Portrait 2000 exhibition in Klatovy and at the International Biennial of Contemporary Art in Prague (2004, 2005). Since 2012, he has been exhibiting independently. After graduation, he devoted himself to portraiture and computer graphics. In 2011, he was selected from 2,500 entries for an international competition in London and won the BP Portrait Award, and in 2013, he was the first recipient of the newly announced SELF Prize for Self-Portraiture, awarded by The Royal Society of Portrait Painters in London and associated with a £20,000 reward. He won in a competition of 946 works by 635 painters from various countries. Mikulka intended to paint a large realistic portrait, but he could not find a suitable model, so he decided to paint himself.

"Mikulka's Self Portrait amazes with its technical perfection and power of expression. "You feel that you are standing in front of the artist, watching him concentrate on his likeness – his eyes hooded yet determined, his lips pressed together through concentration. (Charlotte Mullins, editor of Art Quarterly)

In 2015, he received an award at the Figurativas exhibition at the Museo Europeo de Arte Moderno in Barcelona. In 2016, he received The Changing Faces Foundation award at the Royal Society of Portrait Painters annual exhibition in London for his painting In the Park. In 2019, he was again among the five prize-winning painters in the Figurativas competition (10th International Painting and Sculpture Competition of the Arts and Artists Foundation) in Barcelona for his portrait Sebastian.

His paintings are represented in the collection of the National Gallery in Prague, The Changing Faces Foundation, Museo Europeo de Arte Moderno and in private collections. He is represented by the Cermak Eisenkraft Gallery in Prague. Mikulka has achieved acclaim in international competitions and is one of the few Czech painters to receive commissions from high-ranking customers from Great Britain to the Gulf. His paintings are laborious and take several months to complete, which is why they rarely appear on the open market..

== Work ==
=== Portraits and figurative painting ===
Jan Mikulka has been working in portraiture since his high school studies and first exhibited prior to his admission to the Academy in 2000. Prof. Zdeněk Beran's studio was characterised by a perfect mastery of the technique of oil glaze painting and, simultaneously, by competitiveness. Mikulka consciously follows the heritage of classical painting from the Renaissance to 19th century academic painting, but his realistic portraits are very contemporary. In doing so, he distances himself from photorealistic paintings with a smooth finish and from static and undistinguished contentless images. He does not use the high resolution typical of magazine photography and does not put emphasis on illusionistic painting. The mimesis of his painting does not mean a copy or exact imitation of an existing subject, but an attempt to approach the hidden essence of the subject, which includes the factor of time. According to the gallerist Pavel Feigl - "Mikulka can express the psychology of man, he can capture man in his complexity, as a human being charged with feelings and spiritual vibration".

Portrait painting also carries the inevitable presence of the artist as a "mirror of reality". This sense of self-reflexive gaze deepens the painter's intuitive sense of self and of the perception of the model, creating their interdependence. This is to a large extent also true for one's own reflection in the mirror when painting a self-portrait (Self-Portrait, 2013). If the photographic portrait is a capture of an immediate moment, the painterly portrait offers a unique continuity of perceptual self-absorption during the creative process. Mark Gisbourne appreciates, that "unlike most contemporary self-portraiture, Mikulka's work does not seek to stylize or evoke symbolic associations, idealization, or psychological probing, but rather evokes a sense of distant and impenetrable introspection that provokes uncertainty in the viewer".

Mikulka's commissioned portraits usually depict people from a frontal perspective. If a natural setting is used in the background, it is stripped of unnecessary descriptiveness and serves only to emphasize the subject's presence. The muted penumbra effect of the background also works to model the skin complexion (Sebastian, 2015, In the Park, 2015). In the more formal official portraits, his painting is to some extent more akin to a photographic quality, although even here presented as a subjective interpretation of reality.

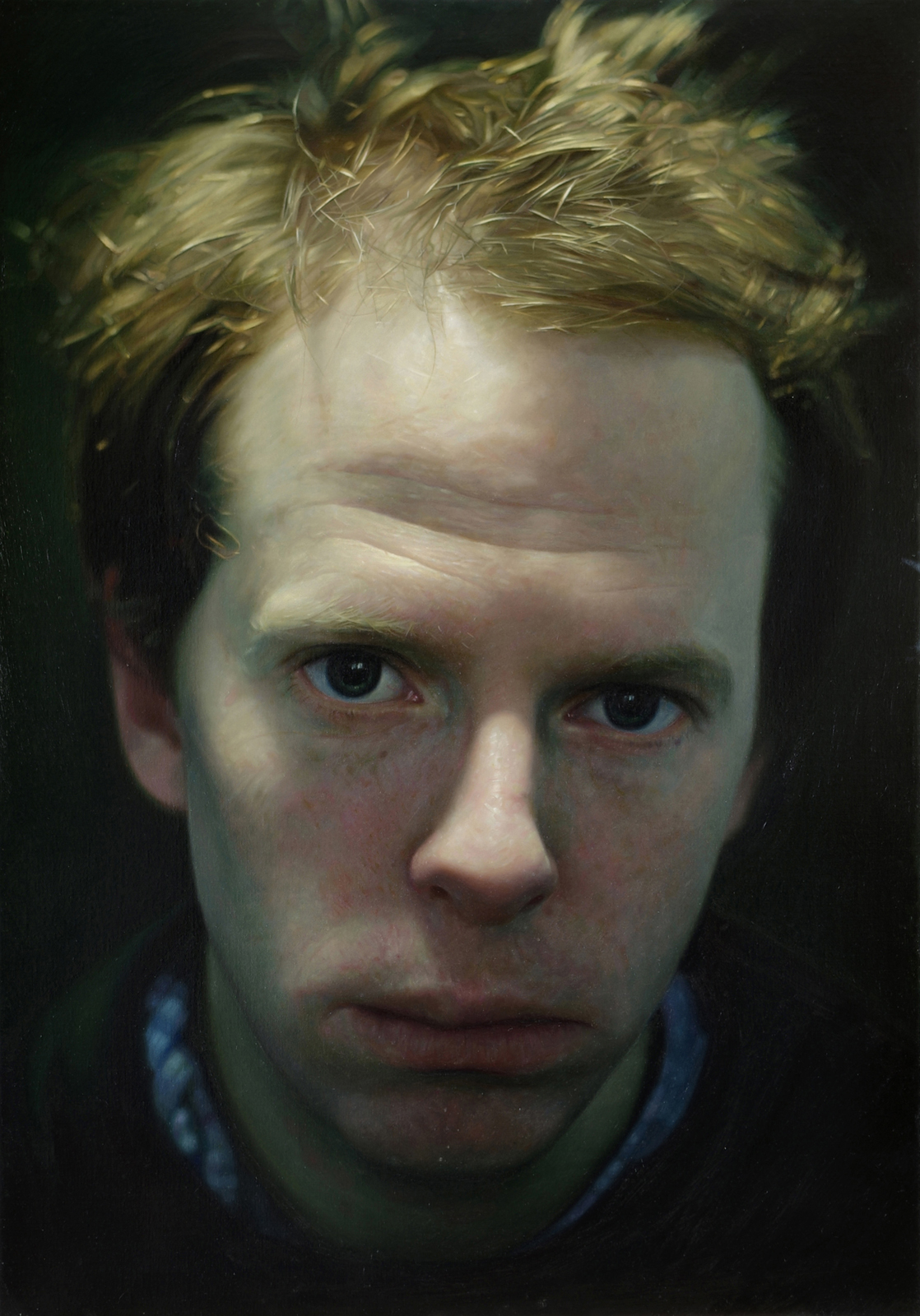
Jan Mikulka, Jacob, 2011

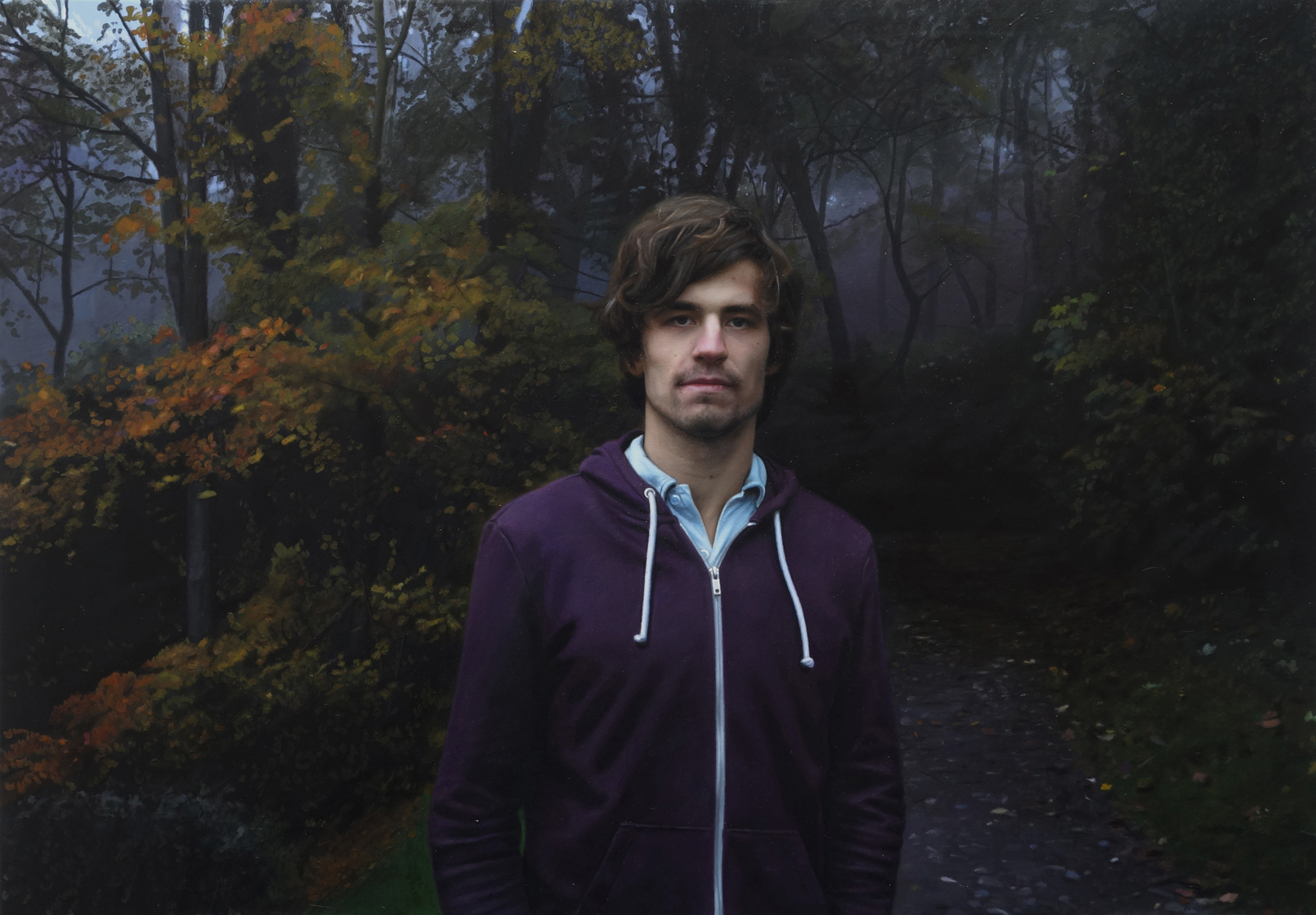
Jan Mikulka, Sebastian, 2015

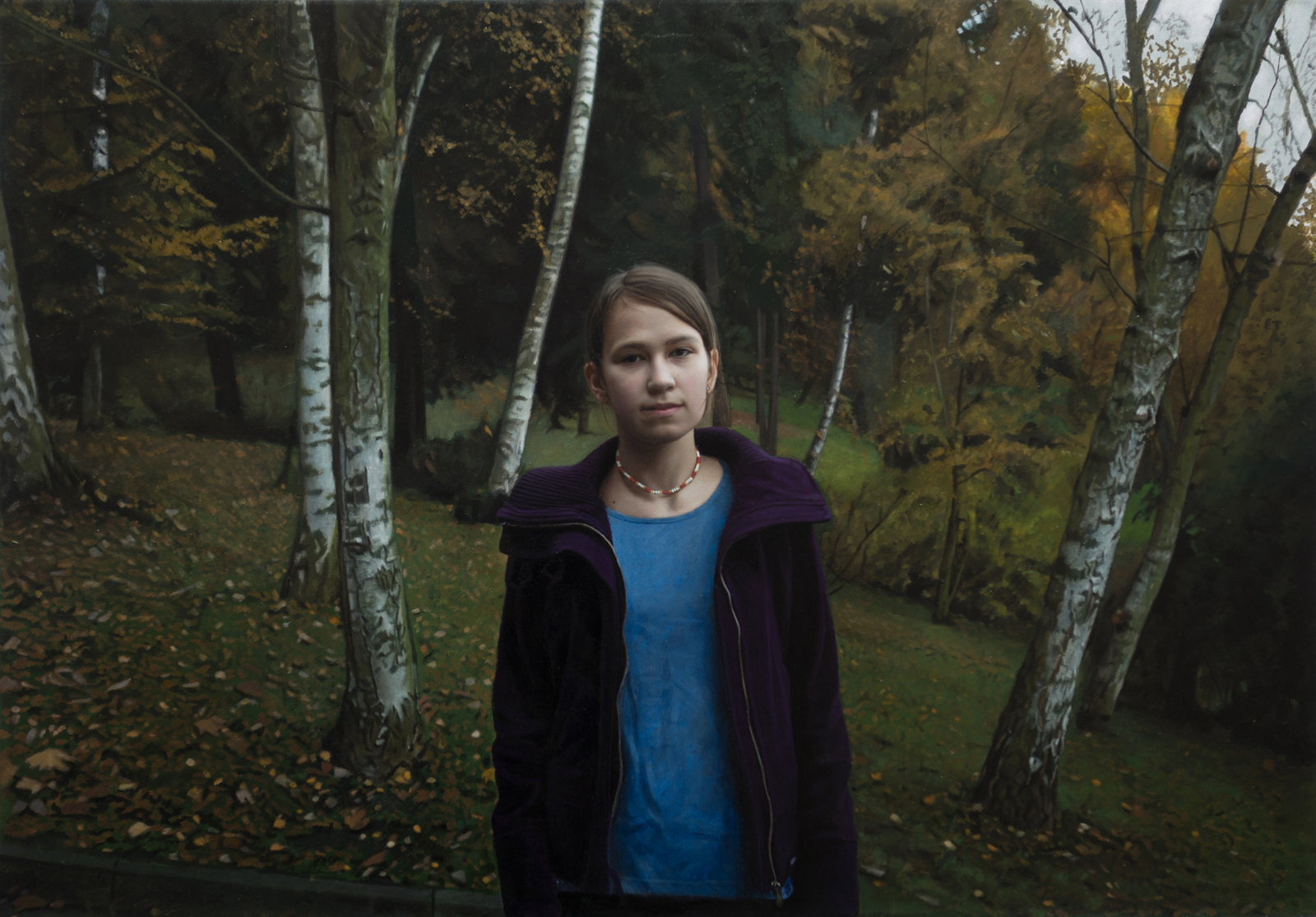
Jan Mikulka, In the Park, 2015

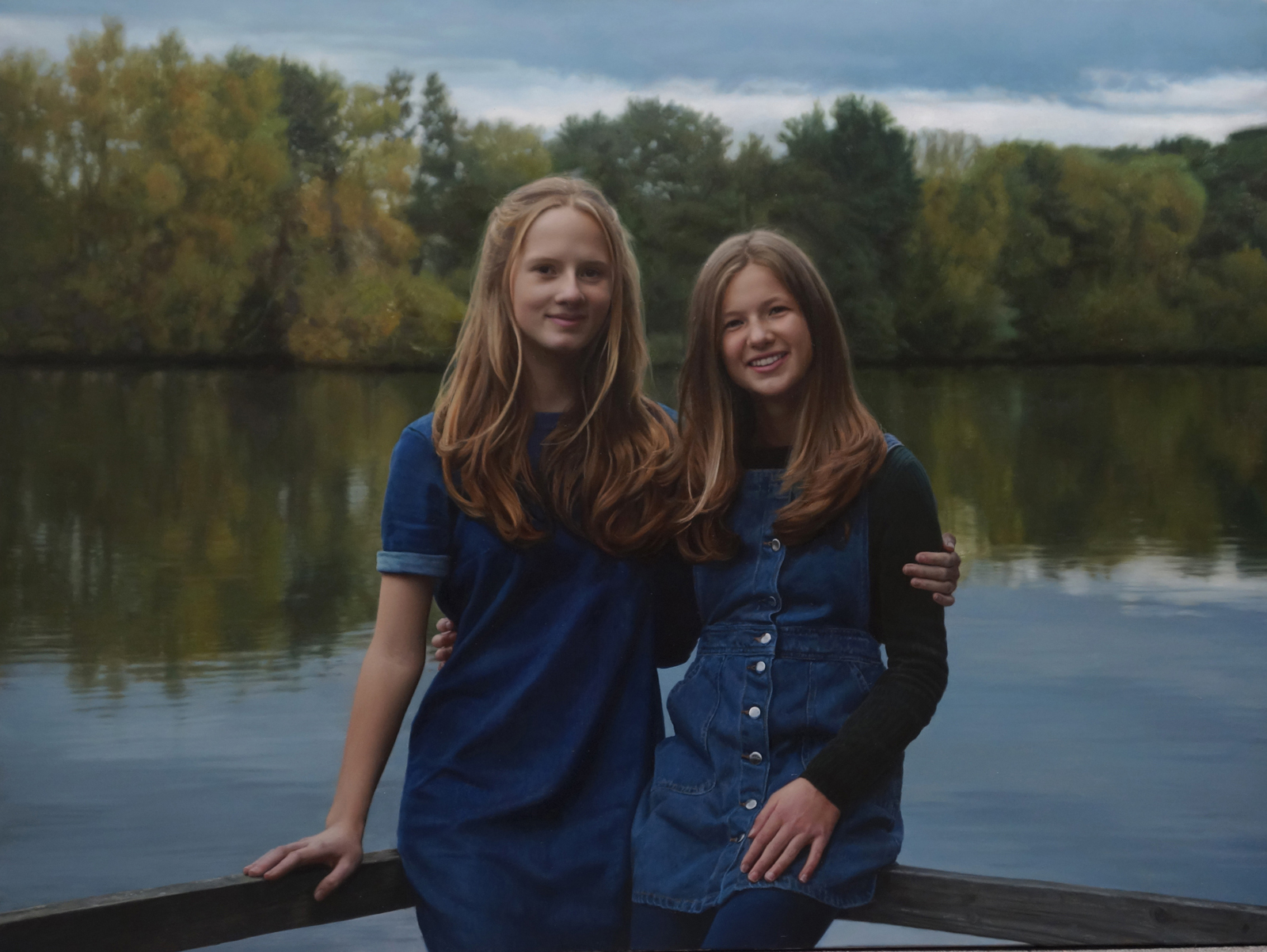
Jan Mikulka, Antonia and Lavinia, 2017

Mikulka's realistically rendered portraits or the dressed women in the bathtub (In the Bathtub, 2013) sometimes appear cold and uninvolved. His nudes also refer more to restrained and idealising paintings such as Velásquez's Venus with a Mirror or Cabanel's eroticism-free Birth of Venus. Mikulka's nudes remain faithful to the tradition of depicting the naked female body as an ideal of beauty, but they do not make eye contact with the viewer, evoking an intimate vulnerability and connotations that are more literary. The formally perfect depiction of shallow flowing water brings a dynamic element to the image. His Blue Nude (2017), depicting the female body as seen from beneath the water level, subverts the usual conventions and adds tangibility and physical immediacy to the female figure.

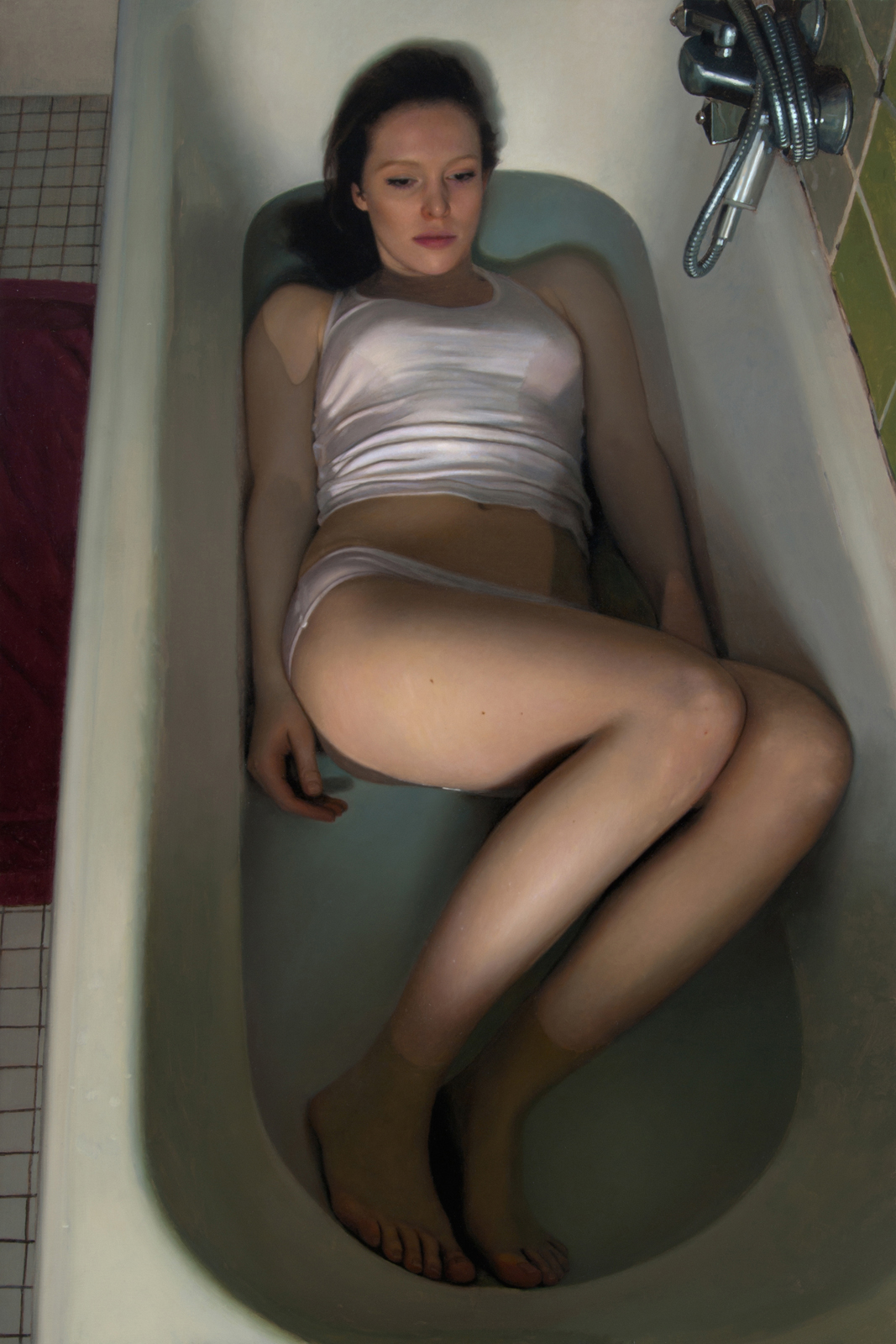
Jan Mikulka, In the Bathtub, 2013

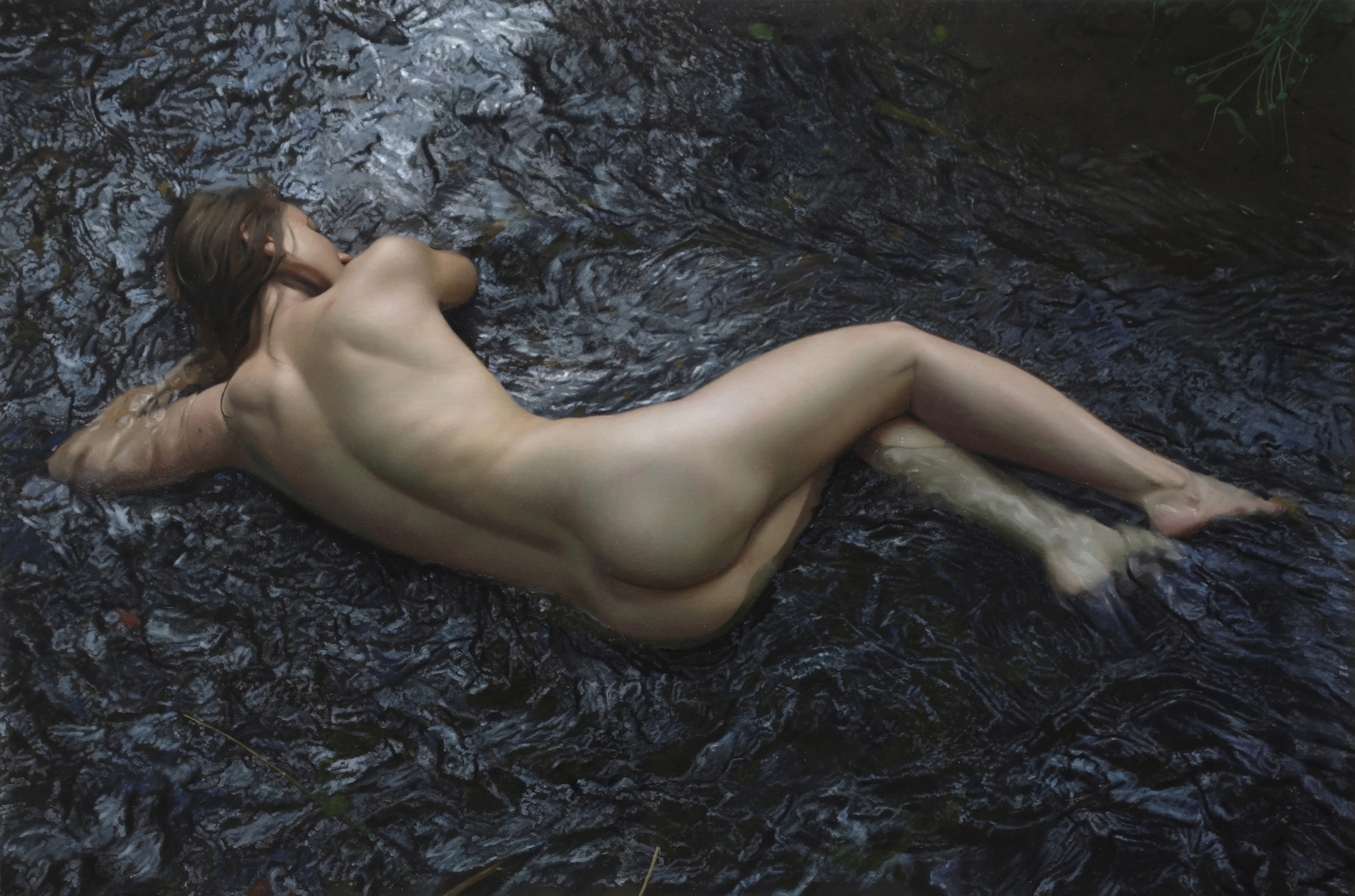
Jan Mikulka, Nude in a Stream I, 2016

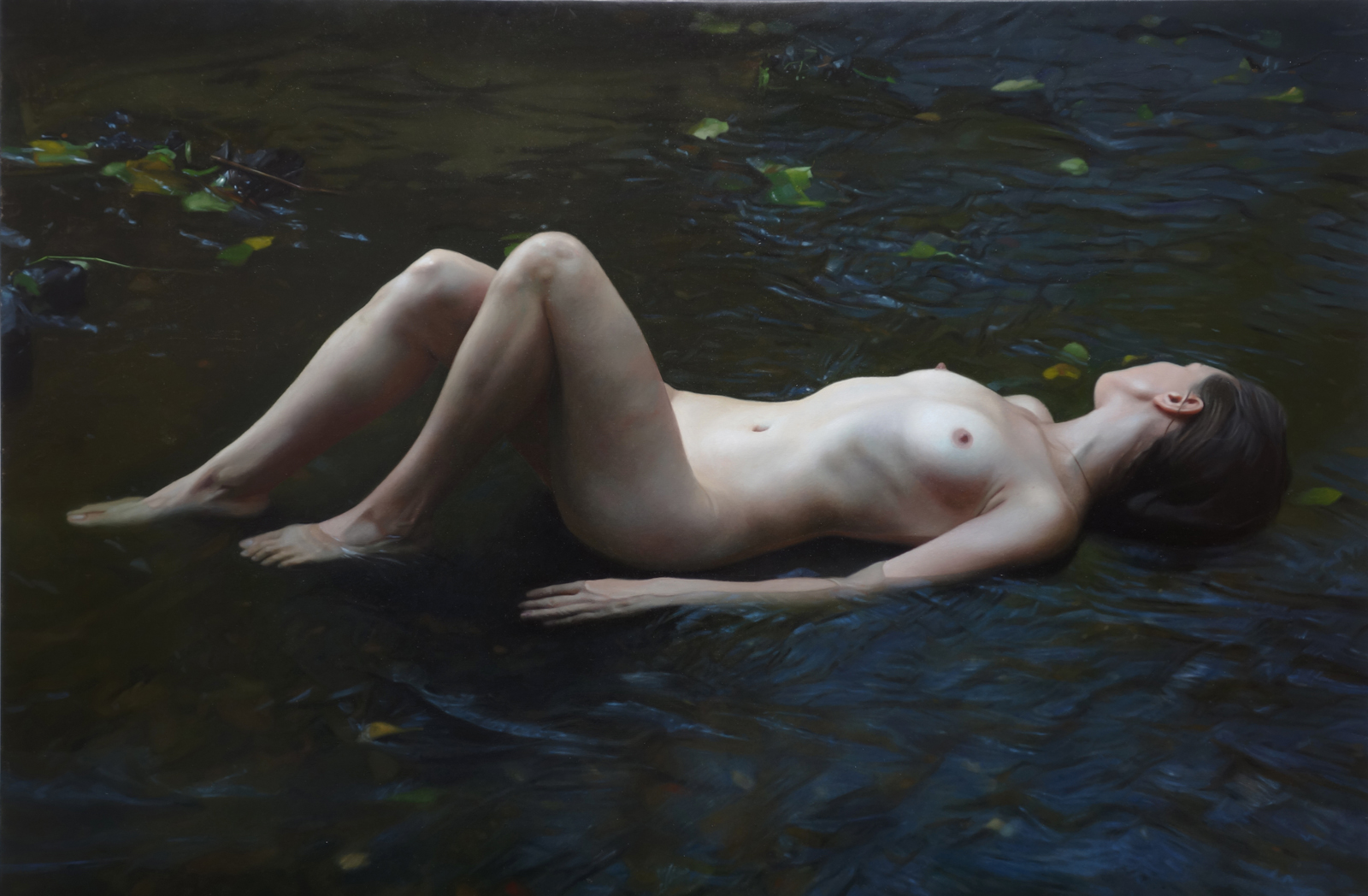
Jan Mikulka, Nude in a Stream II, 2017

In his post-graduation years, Mikulka experimented with painting on the edge of abstraction, attempting to capture the movement and swirling of water and the optical distortion of the reflection of the surroundings on the restless surface (Water, 2008-2011). His work, which can be classified in the broader category of genre scenes, is characterised by a variety of subject matter and art. In 2011-2013, he used a smoke optical effect, a foggy atmosphere (Forest Scenery, 2012) and blurring of the scene. Whether it was an influence of Gerhard Richter´s painting or an attempt to break free from the binding canon of realist painting is not relevant. Unusual in its subject matter, harmonious vibrancy of colour, and the process of painting itself, is The Game from 2012, which depicts out-of-focus figures engaged in an unspecified outdoor game. Similarly, some scenes from domestic life (Pairs, 2013) or situations with an obvious existential subtext (Jacob 4, 2012) are difficult to classify.

=== Still lifes ===
Mikulka's still lifes are partly assembled from common everyday objects, sometimes with paradoxical details referring to the contemporary desacralized consumerist way of life. He plays with the viewer's perception of reality and the illusion of space. His Still Life with Apples, rendered in an old-master manner of painting, where tension is created by the shriveled fruit and the supermarket bag, is also a metaphor for decay. Mikulka's Still Life with Tangerines (2016) plays with the illusion of an inverted reflection on a glass support. In Still Life with Pomegranates (2017-2018), Mikulka uses purely painterly means to create a complex visual matrix of relationships between the depicted objects, linking them in an imaginary or intuitively understood space where more distant objects appear out of focus, bordering on abstraction. The two versions of Still Life with Limes (2016-2017) and Still Life from an Antique Room (2018) are a clear reference to the older masters, and their consistent triangular composition alludes to the painter's certain predilection for visual symmetry. Here, the empirically perceived space is defined only by the wall in the background and a perspectival compression that focuses the viewer's attention on the objects in the middle ground. The carafe and olives are considered objects with symbolic meaning in traditional religious iconography.

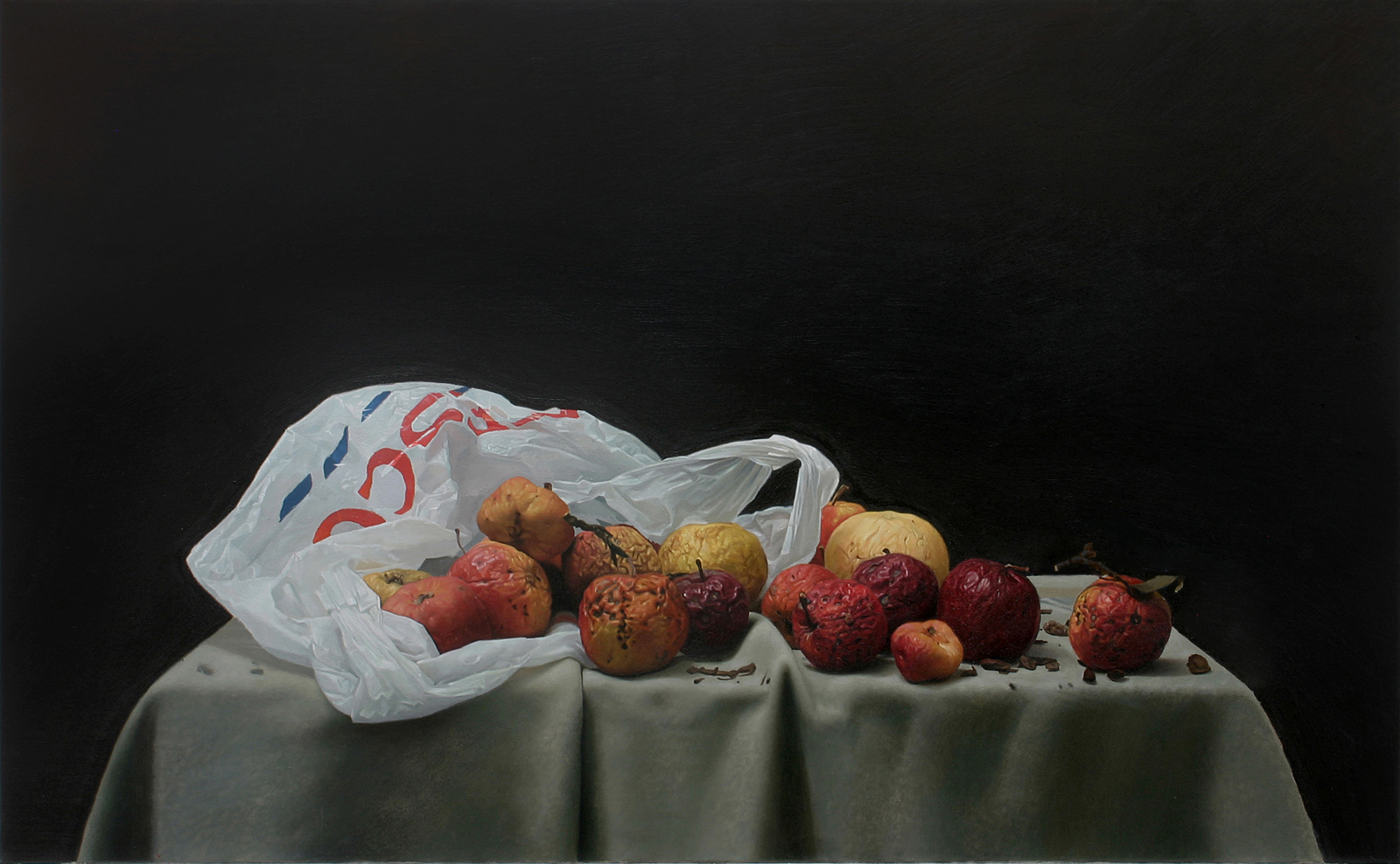
Jan Mikulka, Still Life with Apples, 2011

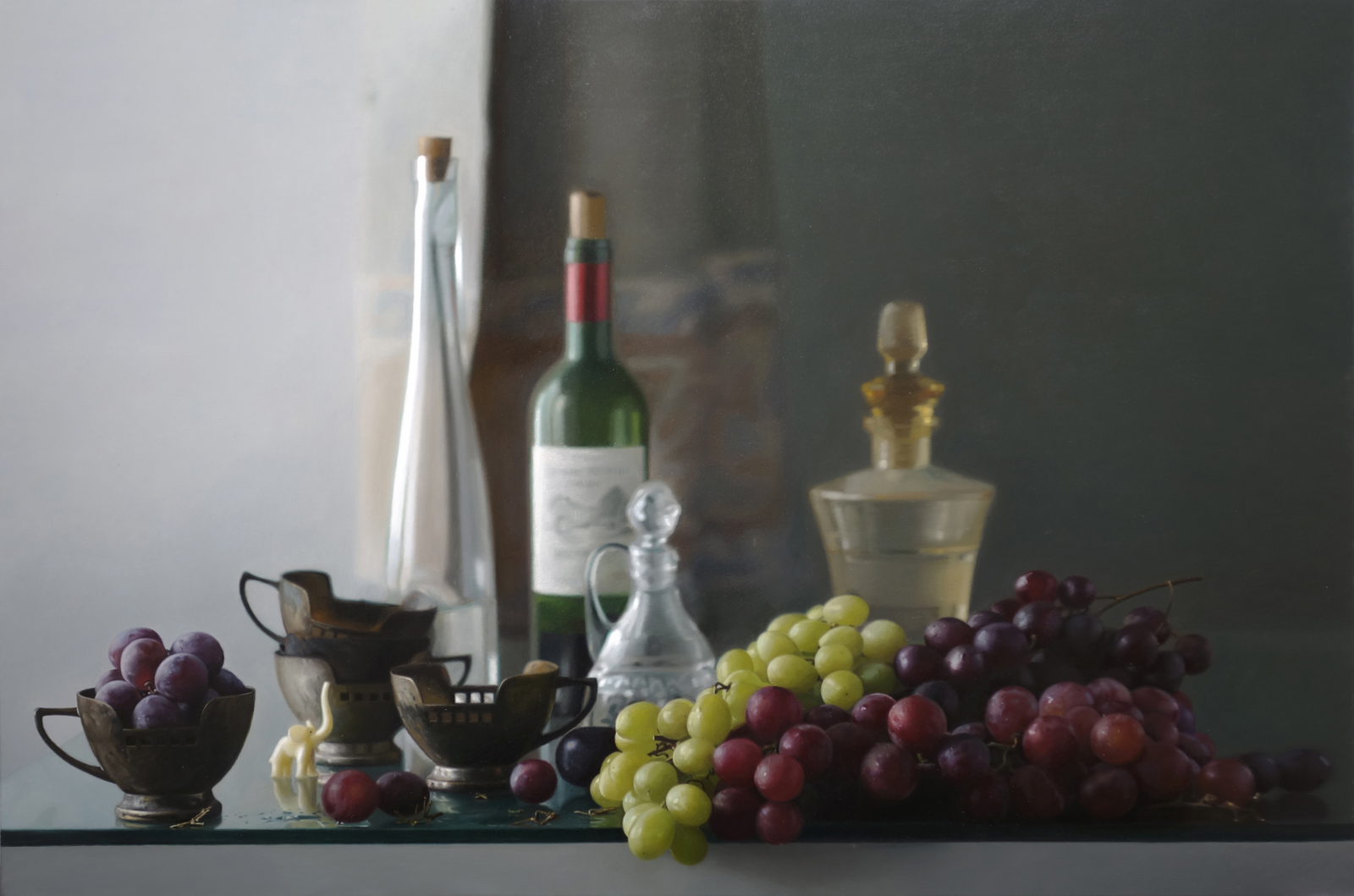
Jan Mikulka, Still Life in Antique Room, 2018

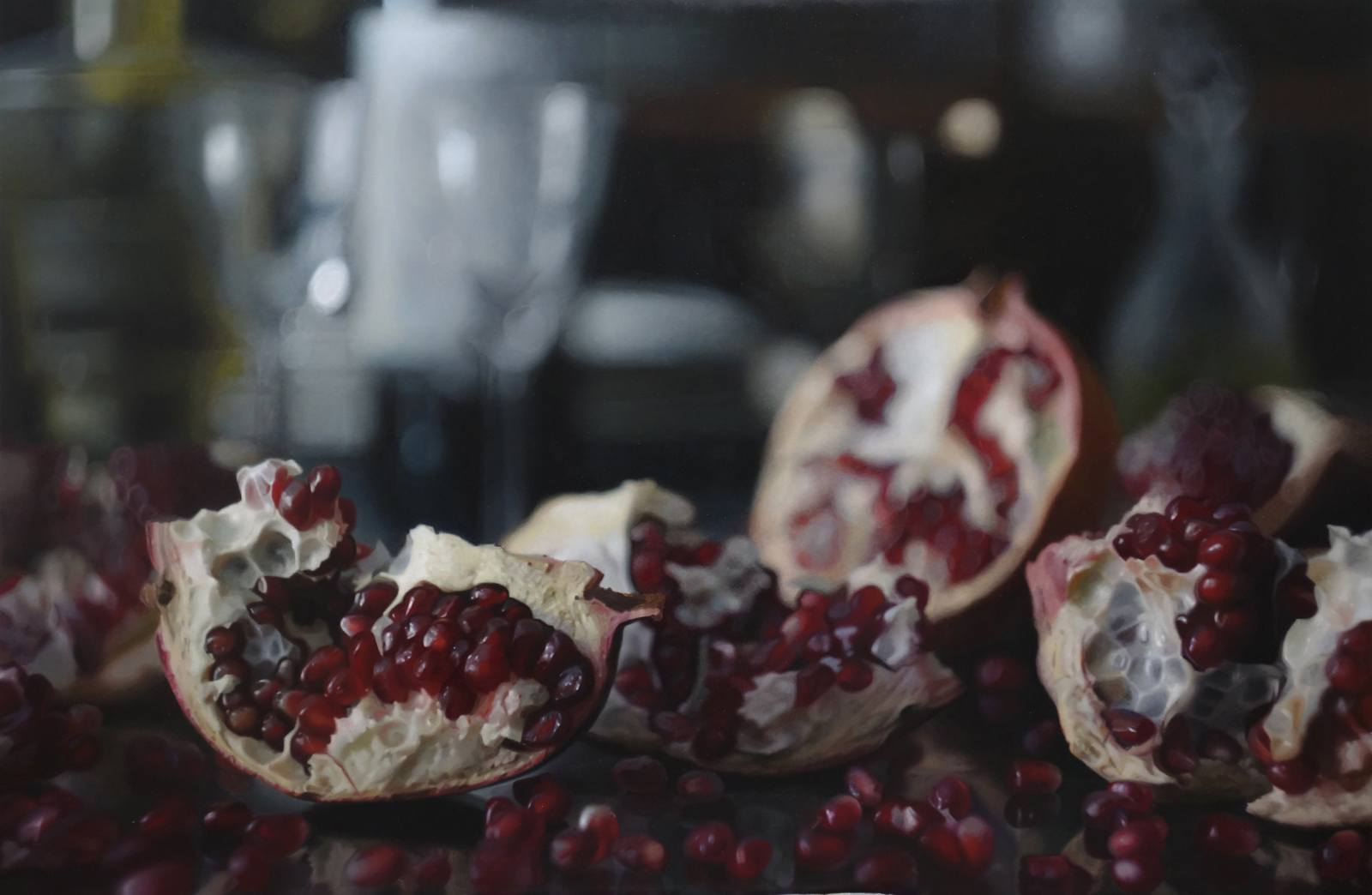
Jan Mikulka, Still Life with Pomegranate, 2017

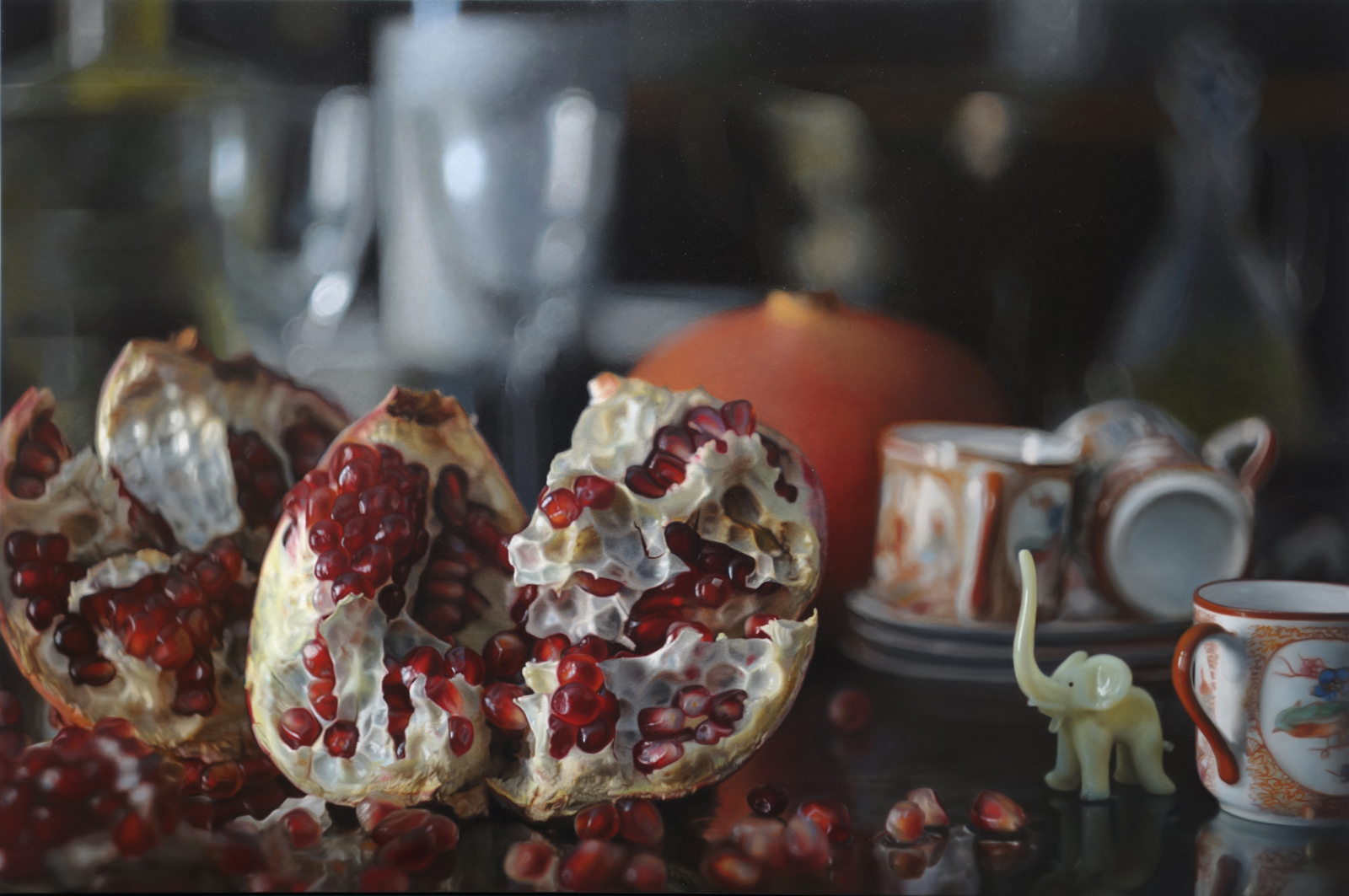
Jan Mikulka, Still Life with Pomegranate and Elephant, 2018

A specific type of still life painting is floral painting, which emerges as a distinct genre from the sixteenth century onwards and has its peak in the seventeenth century. Mikulka's two Still lifes with lilies (2015, 2016) are primarily examples of masterful realistic painting. They probably have nothing to do with the traditional religious symbolism of lilies, which since the Middle Ages have pointed to the immaculate conception of the Virgin Mary. The painter plays with translucency and mirroring the surroundings in the glass vase, referring to the inspiration of van Eyck's Arnolfini Portrait, and emphasizing sensual presence through absence.

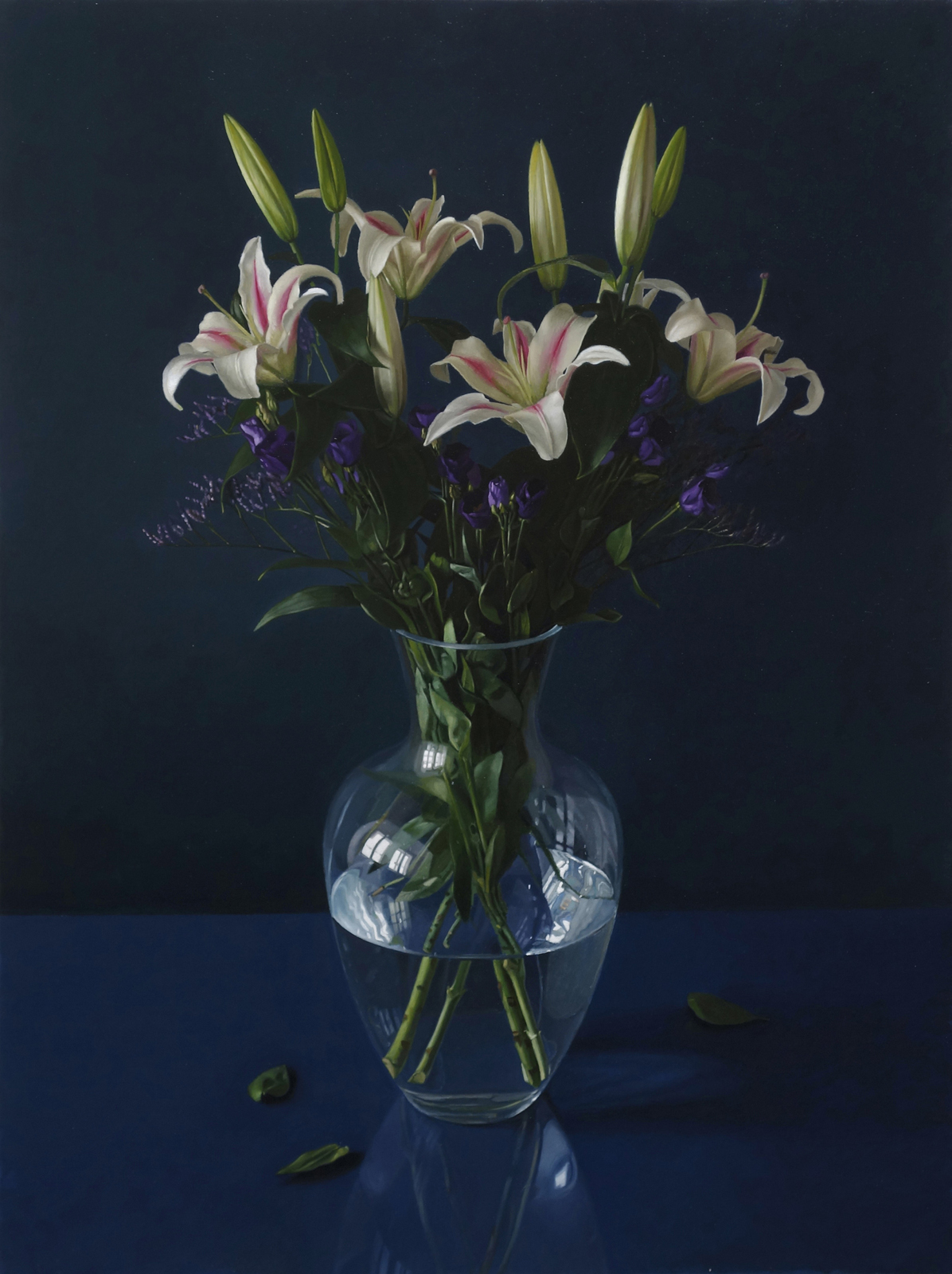
Jan Mikulka, Lilies, 2017

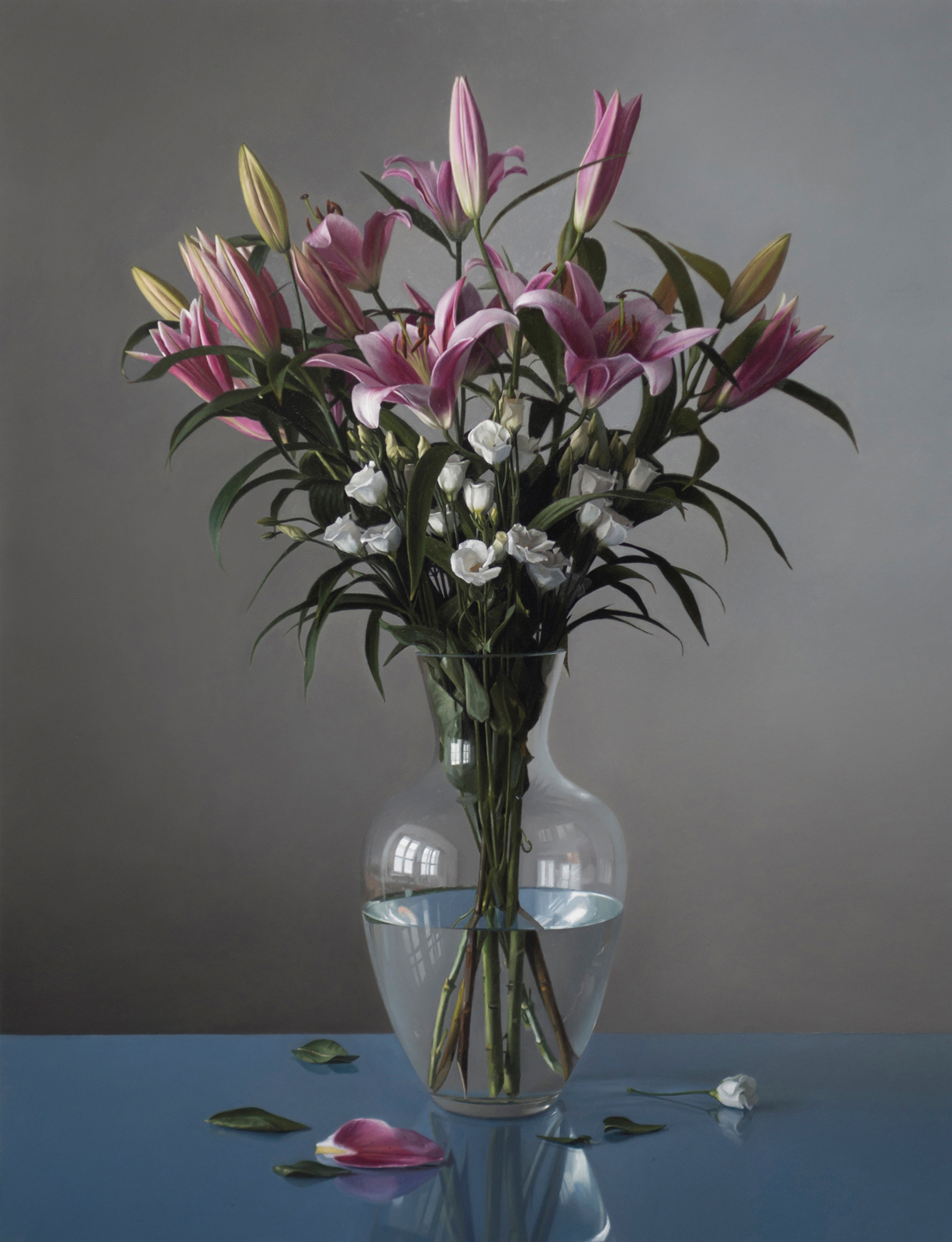
Jan Mikulka, Lilies 2, 2018

=== Motion capture ===
Mikulka's most recent work is characterised by a shift away from his earlier elusiveness and impenetrability towards a clearer expression through straightforward realism. This is particularly true of his paintings, in which he attempts to capture and freeze the movement of the human figure in an almost photographic manner (Arrow, 2014, triptych Ballet Girl, 2018-2019). His realistic approach to painting is nothing more or less than a search for the real, for a creative unity between the mind and the insights mediated by active perception.

=== Award-winning works ===
- 2011 James, BP Portrait Award (Price of visitors), Royal Society of Portrait Painters
- 2013 Self Portrait, winner of SELF portrait prize, Royal Society of Portrait Painters
- 2015 In the Park, Honorable mention, Museo Europeo de Arte Moderno, Barcelona
- 2016 In the Park, winner of The Changing Faces Prize, Royal Society of Portrait Painters
- 2019 Sebastian, award at Figurativas competition (10th International Painting and Sculpture Competition of the Arts and Artists Foundation) in Barcelona

=== Exhibitions (selection) ===
==== Solo ====
- 2012 Jan Mikulka, Moments, Anderle Gallery, Prague
- 2013 Jan Mikulka, Obrazy / Paintings, Kulturní dům Dobříš
- 2019 Yigal Ozeri, Jan Mikulka, In Pursuit of the Real, Cermak Eisenkraft Gallery, Prague
- 2020 An Attempt at Maximum Approximation - KE 3171 096, Museum of Art Olomouc
- 2022 Pavel Baňka – Mezi fotografií a malbou & Jan Mikulka – Mezi malbou a fotografií, Topičův salon, Prague

==== Collective (selection) ====
- 2000 Portrait of the Year 2000, Gallery At the White Unicorn, Klatovy
- 2001 Ateliers of the Academy of Fine Arts / Painting School of Professor Zdeněk Beran, Wortner House of the Aleš Gallery of South Bohemia, České Budějovice
- 2004/ 2005 International Biennial of Contemporary Art, Prague Town Hall, National Gallery in Prague
- 2006 Graduates of AVU 2006, Trade Fair Palace, National Gallery in Prague
- 2011 National Portrait Gallery, London, Wolverhampton Art Gallery, Aberdeen Art Gallery, UK
- 2012 Contemporary Czech and Slovak Painting, National Gallery in Prague
- 2013 Et Cetera, Instituto Italiano di Cultura, Prague
- 2013 Royal Society Of Portrait Painters Annual Exhibition, Mall Galleries, London, UK
- 2013 The Threadneedle Prize, Mall Galleries, London, UK
- 2014 Royal Society Of Portrait Painters Annual Exhibition, Mall Galleries, London, UK
- 2015 Et Cetera, MAXXI Museum, Rome, Italy
- 2015 BP Portrait Awards 2015, National Portrait Gallery, London, UK
- 2015 Figurativas 15, MEAM Museum, Barcelona, Spain
- 2016 Royal Society Of Portrait Painters Annual Exhibition, Mall Galleries, London, Scottish National Portrait Gallery, Edinburgh, Ulster Museum, Belfast, UK
- 2016 Summer Salon Show, Rarity Gallery, Mykonos, Greece
- 2017 Junge Prager, Junge Berliner, Czech center, Berlin, Smetana Q Gallery, Prague
- 2018 Art Fair Art Paris, Grand Palais, Cermak Eisenkraft Gallery, Paris
- 2018 Royal Society Of Portrait Painters Annual Exhibition, Mall Galleries, London
- 2020 Vanitas, DOX Prague
- 2023 ENDLESS POOLS: Jan Mikulka, Michal Ožibko, Zdeněk Trs, Vladimír Véla, Adolf Loos Apartment and Gallery, Prague
- 2024 Forms of Mimesis (Tomáš Kubík, Jan Mikulka, Dušan Mravec, Leoš Suchan, Martin Velíšek), Gallery of Česká spořitelna

== Sources ==
- Mark Gisbourne, Dominique Nahas, Tomáš Zapletal: Yigal Ozeri, Jan Mikulka, In Pursuit of the Real, Cermak Eisenkraft Gallery, Prague 2019
- Barbora Kundračíková (ed.), Fascination with the Real – Hyperrealism in Czech Painting, Museum of Art Olomouc 2017, ISBN 9788088103219
- Alena Benešová, Jiří Pátek, Element F.: Photography and Art in the Second Half of the 20th Century, Moravian Gallery in Brno 2012, ISBN 978-80-7027-256-5
- Milan Knížák, Tomáš Vlček, 909: Umění přelomu tisíciletí ze sbírek Národní galerie v Praze 1990–2009 / Art from the Turn of the Millennium in the National Gallery in Prague Collections 1990-2009, Prague 2009
- Zdeněk Beran, Pavel Holas, Jan Kříž, Defenestration: exhibition of graduates and students of the AVU studio of Prof. Zdeněk Beran, New Town Hall, Dobel s.r.o. Prague 2008
- Zdeněk Beran, Graduates of AVU 2006, 42 p., Academy of Fine Arts, Prague 2006, ISBN 80-239-7170-0
- Ivan Hartmann (ed.), International Biennale of Contemporary Art 2005: A Second Sight, 828 p., National Gallery in Prague 2005, ISBN 80-7035-301-5
- Vlastimil Tetiva, Ateliery AVU: Malířská škola profesora Zdeňka Berana / The Painting School of Professor Zdeněk Beran, Alšova jihočeská galerie v Hluboké nad Vltavou 2001, ISBN 80-85857-51-0
- Helena Hrdličková et al., Portrét roku 2000 / The Portrait of the Year, Galerie Klatovy / Klenová, 2000, ISBN 80-85628-56-2
