= Zdeněk Beran =

Czech painter and university educator (1937–2014)

Professor, acad. painter Zdeněk Beran
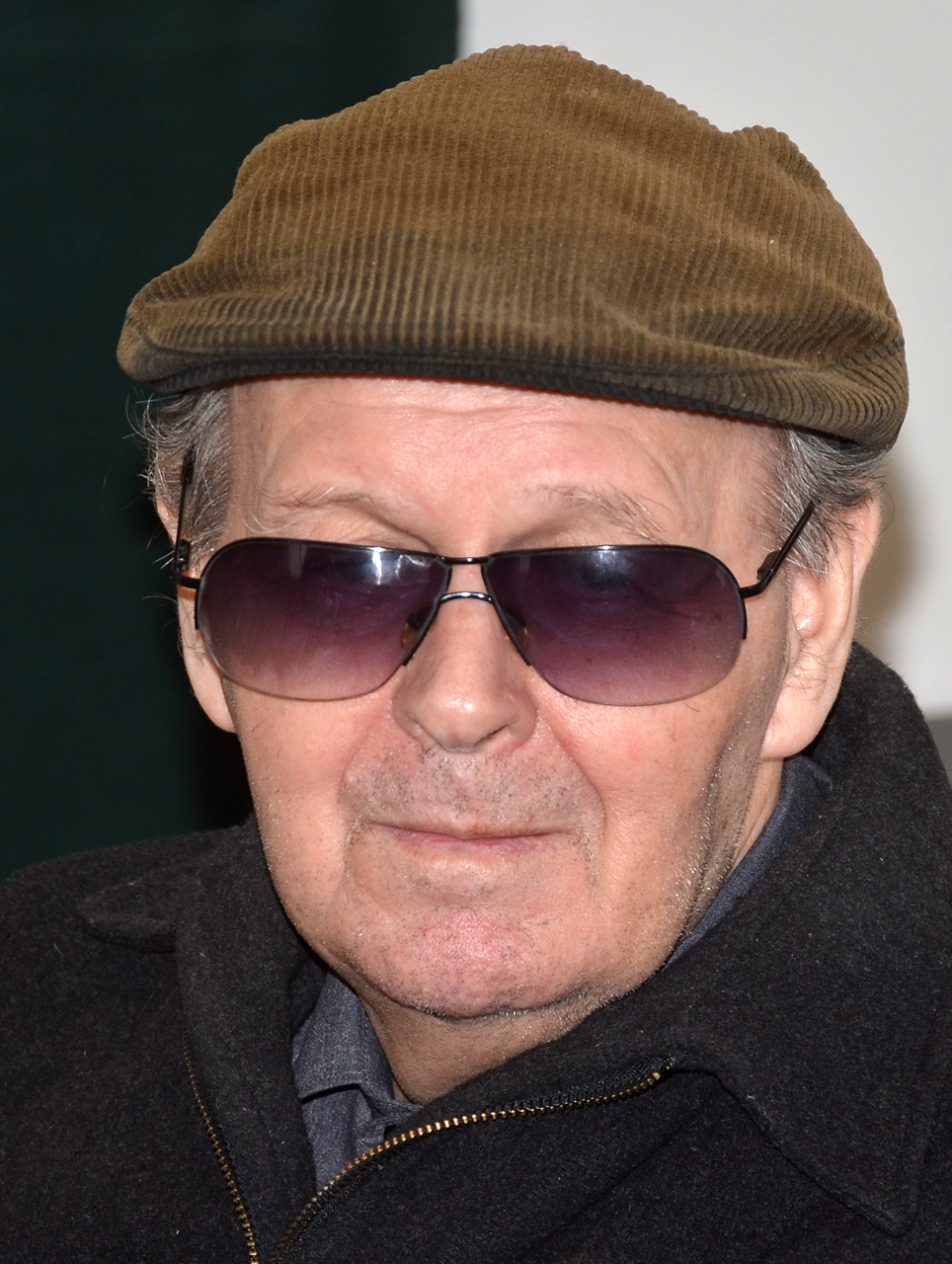
- Zdeněk Beran (2014)
- Born: 7 March 1937; Dolní Dobrouč, Czechoslovakia
- Died: 7 November 2014 (aged 77); Prague, Czech Republic
- Education: Academy of Fine Arts, Prague
- Known for: painter, sculptor, professor at the Academy of Fine Arts in Prague
- Movement: groups Confrontation (1960), The Backwards (1987), Mánes Union of Fine Arts (2006)
- Patrons: Pollock-Krasner Foundation Scholarship (1989)
- Website: Zdeněk Beran website

Zdeněk Beran' (7 March 1937 – 7 November 2014) was a Czech painter, author of objects and installations, professor and vice-rector of Academy of Fine Arts, Prague.

== Life ==
Zdeněk Beran attended the Václav Hollar Art School in Prague, Vinohrady district from 1952. Professor Zdeněk Balaš, with whom he studied painting, was a liberal pedagogue and introduced his students to pre-war Czech modernism, represented by Filla, Gutfreund and Kubišta. Beran's high school classmates and friends were Petr Bareš, Eva Bednářová, Kateřina Černá, Antonín Málek, Pavel Nešleha, Lubomír Přibyl or Dana Vachtová.

In 1956–1962 Beran continued his studies in the studio of mural and monumental painting of professor Vladimír Sychra at the Academy of Fine Arts in Prague. He belonged to an informal group that called itself "Somráci" (The Outcasts), together with Antonín Tomalík, Zbyšek Sion, Antonín Málek, some musicians and photographers. Group symbolized the anarchism of life attitudes and the autonomy of art as a part of life. Student life on the periphery of society centered around cheap tap bars, pubs and snack bars and included frequent changes of housing - in dormitories, in student hostels, in sublets, with friends, in a former laundry in Prague suburb, and finally in an arbour in Troja, which became Beran's studio.

After graduating from the academy, he tried unsuccessfully for two years to avoid the compulsory military service by activities that almost amounted to self-destruction, but was eventually drafted anyway.

In 1979 he was represented at the exhibition "The Image of Man in European Art since 1945" in Amsterdam and in 1983 at the exhibition "Dessins tchèques du 20e siècle" at the Centre Georges Pompidou in Paris.

In 1989, he received a creative grant from The Pollock-Krasner Foundation. In 1990, he became a professor of painting at the Academy of Fine Arts in Prague and founded the Atelier of Classical Painting Techniques, where two generations of talented students have studied. Most of them later made their mark on the art scene at home and abroad (Karel Balcar, Jan Mikulka, Hynek Martinec, Tomáš Kubík, and others). Since 1990, he has also served as Vice-Rector of the Academy of Fine Arts. Since 2005, he was a member of Mánes Union of Fine Arts, but in 2012, together with some of his former students, he withdrew from the association in protest against its undemocratic practices. (Note: Josef Záruba-Pfeffermann, Proces v Mánesově aneb rozklad výtvarných spolků po česku / The Process at Mánes or the Decomposition of Art Associations in the Czech Republic, 2013)

Beran's work has been exhibited at several retrospective exhibitions (Gallery of Modern Art in Hradec Králové, 1996, National Gallery in Prague, 2007, Aleš South Bohemian Gallery in Hluboká, 2007) and together with graduates of his studio at the exhibition Fascination with Reality - Hyperrealism in Czech Painting (Museum of Art, Olomouc, 2017). In the 1990s he participated in exhibitions of Czechoslovak art abroad (Osnabrück, Bonn, Cologne, Reims, Brussels). He is represented in most Czech and Moravian galleries and in prestigious collections abroad (Centre Georges Pompidou, Musée national d'art moderne, etc.)

== Death ==
Zdeněk Beran died in Prague on 7 November 2014 at the age of 77.

== Work ==
The Founders of Modern Czech Art exhibition (Brno, 1957, Prague, 1958) was a groundbreaking event, which for the first time since the February communist coup showed works of Czech expressionism and cubism. In his early work, Beran transformed these impulses and from figures (Lidice, 1958, Design of Figures for the Ceremonial Hall of the Crematorium, graduation thesis 1959–1962, destroyed), portraits and still lifes, by gradually breaking down the artistic form, he eventually became completely detached from visible reality (Hint of Three Figures - Destruction, 1959–1961).

From there, a direct path led to raw material painting, by which Beran, together with Antonín Tomalík, Antonín Málek, Jiří Valenta and Čestmír Janošek, ranked among the most radical representatives of Czech Informel (The End of the Image, 1960). These works, by which the younger generation sharply opposed the art of the time and created a completely new aesthetic based on immediate life experience, were an unconcealed expression of hopeless pessimism. According to Beran, the atmosphere of smoky pubs, the yellowish glazes of urine on the asphalt walls of men's toilets, the swampy walls of Prague's peripheries and the dim glimpses of Baroque paintings in the darkened interiors of churches were the sources of inspiration. The perfectly crafted details of Gothic cathedrals, hidden from the observer's eye, gave meaning to seemingly futile efforts.

In the first half of the 1960s, Beran was concerned with the representation of the principle of destruction and construction. He disturbed the images formed in low reliefs of sculpturally worked uncoloured masses with gestural interventions. Beran's work is characterized by the barocization of material structures, which manifests itself in the rebellion and opening up of the structure and visualizes the inner momentum and energy of matter (Exhaust, 1965, The Bulge, 1965). The expressiveness of the high raw structures, compressed into a lapidary order, has monumental potency and expresses the drama of individual existence and the pathos of human destiny.

From the mid-1960s onwards, Zdeněk Beran turned to the illusionistic verism of classical painting, replacing the drastic naturalism of the matter. Beran's fascination with situations of decay and impermanence is linked to the baroque drama of painting (The pumpkin-shaped head of an individual, 1966), creating bizarrely fanciful relief paintings and objects that foreshadow his subsequent three-dimensional installations (The Discrepancy of Repose , 1968, The Head that Wanted to Look Over the Rope, 1968–1969, Object III - Surrender, 1969). The Kafkaesque metaphor Attempt at Stability (1968–1969) with the stripped trousers of a vagrant was executed in several versions from drawing and object to illusion painting and exhibited at the 1969 la Biennale des jeunes artistes in Paris. The artist moves from an intimate expression to an artistic communication that attempts to reflect the objective reality of which he himself is a part and to define the meanings contained therein.

Beran's work after the Warsaw Pact invasion of Czechoslovakia reflects the trauma of life (Object III, Surrender, 1969), which is constantly renewed by direct confrontation with reality. He composes scenes in which fragments of discarded and devastated objects create a world of pseudo-movement in deliberately unpleasant and ugly groupings, evoking associations linked to physical threat, illness and extinction.

In 1970–1971, in his basement studio in Karlín, he created a large-scale installation Rehabilitation Ward of Dr.Dr. (Note: Psychiatrist MUDr Stanislav Drvota psychologically examined a total of 25 artists born in the period 1923–1942, classified them according to several typological scales and attempted to correlate their personality with some aspects of their works. The result was the study Personality and Creation (Avicenum 1973), which, among other things, published some of the works of artists who were no longer allowed to exhibit during the normalization period) The theme reflects the crisis of humanity and the catastrophe of human existence, exposed to violence, brutality and cruelty, when people become torsos and cripples. There is an element of positive humour in the work, as the torsos in hospital beds are so unwell that rehabilitation is out of the question. Jan Kříž referred to this condition, in which a person, when confronted with a crippling situation, can pose as dead or paralyzed, as "crippling mimicry", or "responsive crippling." The installation could not be exhibited publicly during the normalization period and since 1971 was only available to interested parties privately in Beran's studio. It was not until 1992 that part of it became an object in the exhibition of Czech art for the International Association of Art Critics Congress in Prague. In 1994, the objects were transported to the grounds of the Bredov castle near Lemberk and buried in an excavated pit. After seven years they were exhumed and their ruins exhibited in the National Gallery in Prague.

Drawings of intended and unrealized projects play a significant role in Beran's work from the normalization period, when he was not allowed to present his work in public. In the study Earth Project (1972), human torsos, similar to the objects from the Rehabilitation Ward, are installed in spaces defined by rectangular labyrinths dug into the ground like trenches. Other subjects are parades of such torsos (The Friendly Cripples, 1972, Parade of Mobile Smiles, 1974) or a series of various figurative compositions on wheelchairs (Feeding on the Move, 1973, Mobile Cutter, 1974). Beran thematizes human misery - convulsive smiles, mouths open to scream, torn fragments of bodies, faces merging with a wheelchair. Crippling is the theme of Beran's literary text from the 1970s, an absurd grotesque similar to some of Samuel Beckett's texts - The Cripple's May Day (1976).

Beran's drawings reflect a multilayered reality as a collage of situations, juxtaposing fragments of the human face with garbage, various unsightly structures, packaging, rubber objects caught in wire mesh, or the corpse of a bird with exposed entrails (Winner, 1979, New Installation of Smile, 1977). Contrasting with the expressionist theme is the precise, clear, subtle, veristic drawing, which intensifies the feeling of the wretchedness of human existence (Installation of a Scream, 1979, Installation of a Can, 1979–1980, Study of a Situation, 1981, Study of the Head in General Position, 1985). Beran sets a cold mirror to his time and at the same time redeems it by turning horror into beauty and brightness of thought, purity of emotion and decisiveness of will.

Suitcases were first used in the installation The Rehabilitation Ward of Dr. Dr., as a multi-sensory symbol of oppression and a means of escape (Let's Pack It Up, 1971). From the mid-1970s onwards, drawings and objects of suitcases emerged as another existential theme (The First Material and Technical Base of Life in a Suitcase, 1974). Drawings of faces are part of their content (Suitcase I: Fear of Existence in a Suitcase, 1976, Suitcase II and III: The Last Singing of a Popular Star in a Suitcase, 1976). The theme of suitcases reflects the severe depression of the 1970s, the breaking of links to the positive legacies of the past, the isolation behind the Iron Curtain, the humiliation and evil accompanying the despotic communist regime. The suitcase as a principle of concretization and delineation of space then became the central theme of Beran's work at the turn of the 1970s and 1980s. The work itself is the content of the suitcase, which limits it externally and at the same time allows the work to be freely manipulated and effectively placed in reality. The interior space offers a wide field of elaboration as well as the tempting possibility of using illusory elements. According to Beran, the meaning of a Baroque temple painting can thus be brought into the trunk and with it under the bed. The freedom in the choice of artistic means is limited only by their validity and persuasiveness, since the aim is "the most precise expression of the inexpressible."

In 1980, Zdeněk Beran, together with Jiří Sozanský, Oldřich Kulhánek, Ivan Bukovský, Lubomír Janečka, etc., created a complex environment in the Theresienstadt Ghetto. All the participating artists lived and worked for three months in a place where anxiety and distress accompanied them throughout the whole time. The Beran installation included monstrous bloated packages suspended from a structure in the space, resembling human torsos and suitcases placed in the area of the solitary confinement. The inside of the suitcases, revealed by their partial destruction, contained the remains of clothing, shoes, books, newspapers and other traces of human existence. The hanging objects remained in Terezín and were later destroyed. In the following years, the suitcases became part of the large-scale installation The Journey (1980–1990), presented for the first time at an unofficial exhibition at Bedřich Dlouhý's summer house in Netvořice (6 suitcases, 1981).

In 1983–1985, Zdeněk Beran created chamber models of 1:50 scale installations including drawings, objects and structures (Models of Spatial Formations). At the turn of the 1980s and 1990s, he designed models of Games with Pictures, Objects and Structures, in which, in addition to the picture surface, objects with structurally modelled relief surfaces play a role and become part of the reverse side of the picture in later realisations. One of the models was exhibited on a monumental scale as Playing with Cabbage Heads at the unofficial exhibition Forum 1988 in Prague marketplace. In this work, the artist combined two contradictory creative principles and used a crude multi-sensory installation with first aid stretchers, real cabbage heads that gradually decomposed and smelled, and a wall with ugly black and red traces of shattered cabbage heads (heads?) as a contrast to the perfect hyperrealistic painting of cabbage heads. In his text, Beran himself describes this work as "A mock-up of a fundamental transformation - real objects turned into objects on the way to a confusing illusion in the borders of wandering without end."

Since the late 1980s, Zdeněk Beran has been mostly painting, but the theme of destruction continues to be present in his work (Signs of the Void, 1989), sometimes as the reverse side of a painting that becomes part of the whole. The beauty contrasts sharply with the depicted decay and speaks of the nature of human civilization, which turns everything originally pure into horror. The counterpart of Beran's perfect illusive paintings are raw and dark relief structures reminiscent of his informel period. These form the reverse of a painting, a separate panel or object that is incorporated into a spatial installation (Final Solution, 1989–2000), and thus represent Beran's version of the Vanitas theme.

Since the early 1990s, when Zdeněk Beran founded the studio of classical painting at the Academy of Fine Arts, the importance of the hanging painting was constantly questioned among art theoreticians and classical painting seemed to be in crisis. Beran dealt with this topic in a number of texts and considered the defence of painting as part of his teaching.

According to Vítková, Beran's way of painting is reminiscent of Rimbaud: "I sat beauty on my knees and insulted it." He painted perfect details of the human body as fragments of reality in maximum close-up, including deformations characteristic of digital photography. The result was the monumental paintings Left Breast Nipple (2005), Front Side of Torso, 2005, Reverse Side of Torso, 2006, Image Fragment-My Knee, 2006). He leaves a part of the canvas surface as a white or coloured field or completes it with relief gestural painting and places the realistic painting in the picture as if he were only quoting it.

== Gallery ==
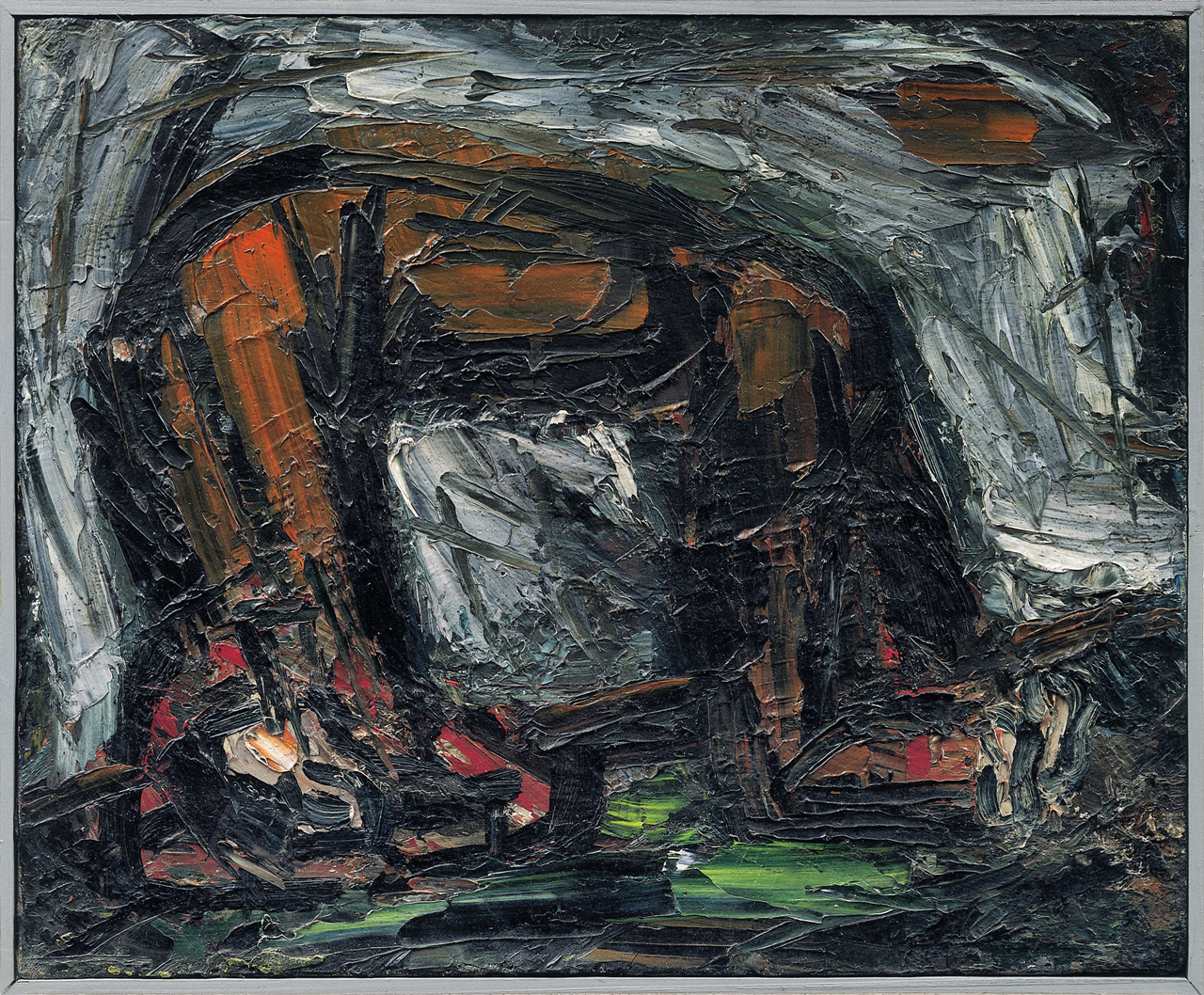
Kneeling (1958)

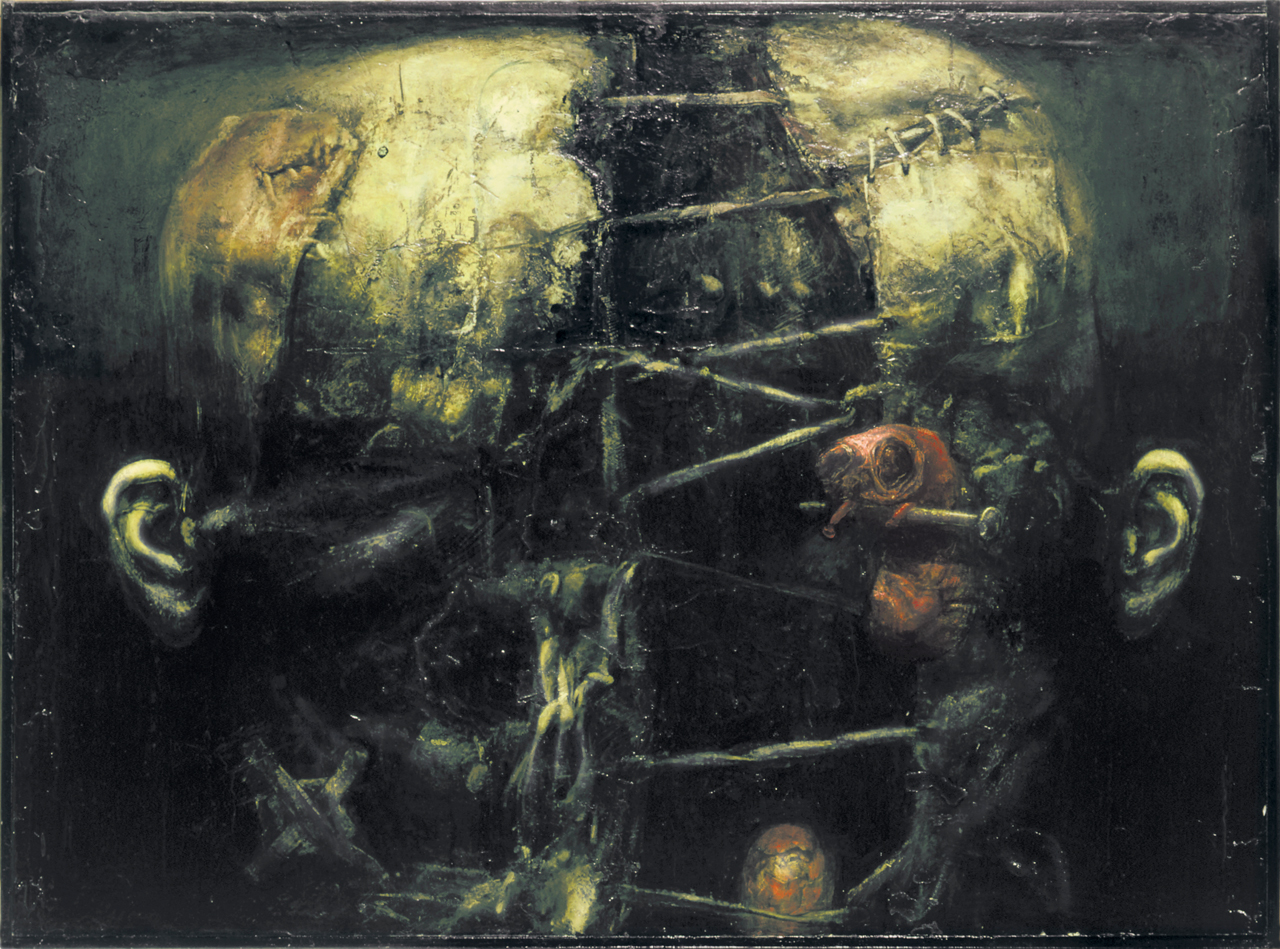
Pumpkin-shaped Head of an Individual (1966)

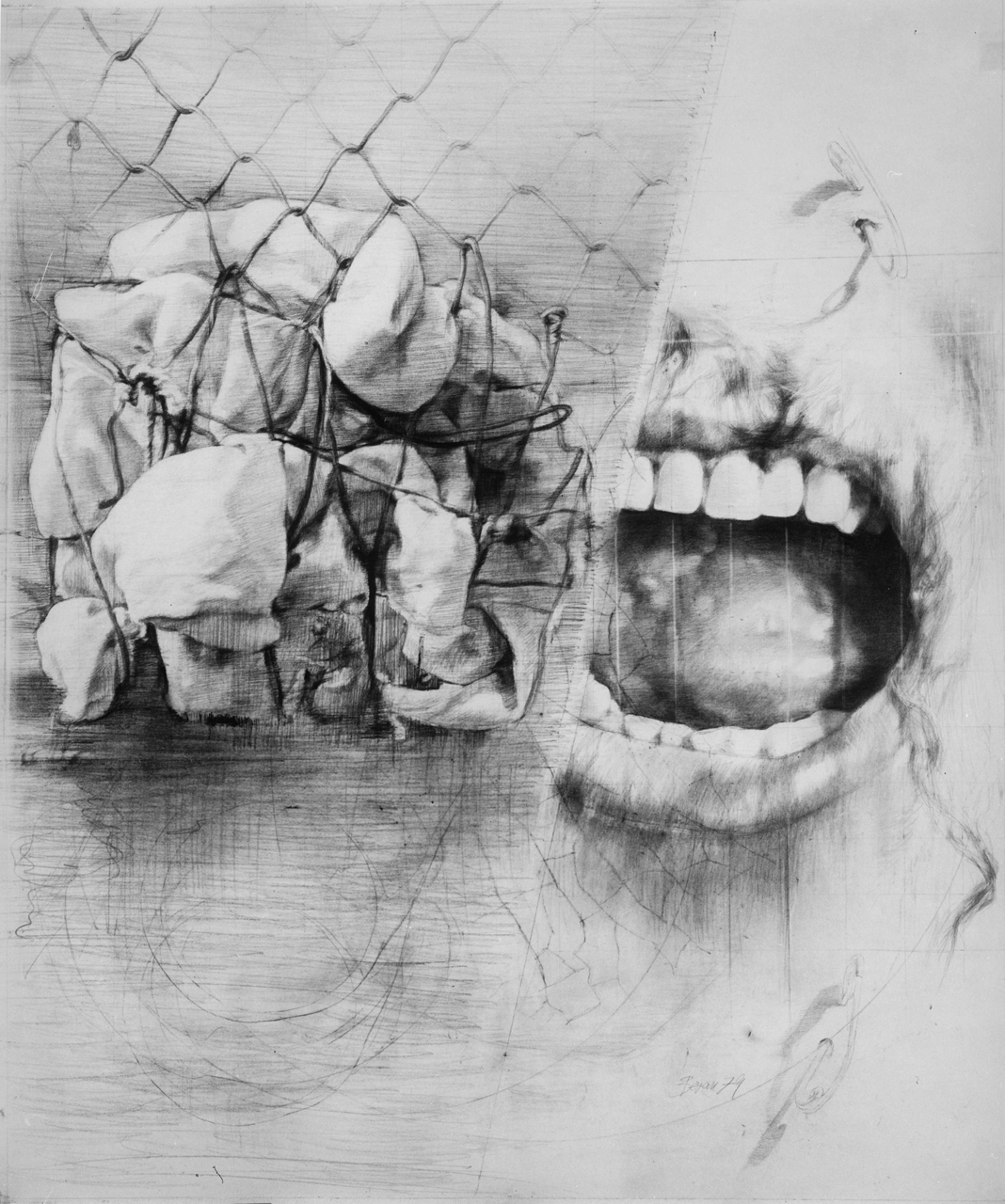
Installation of Scream (1979)

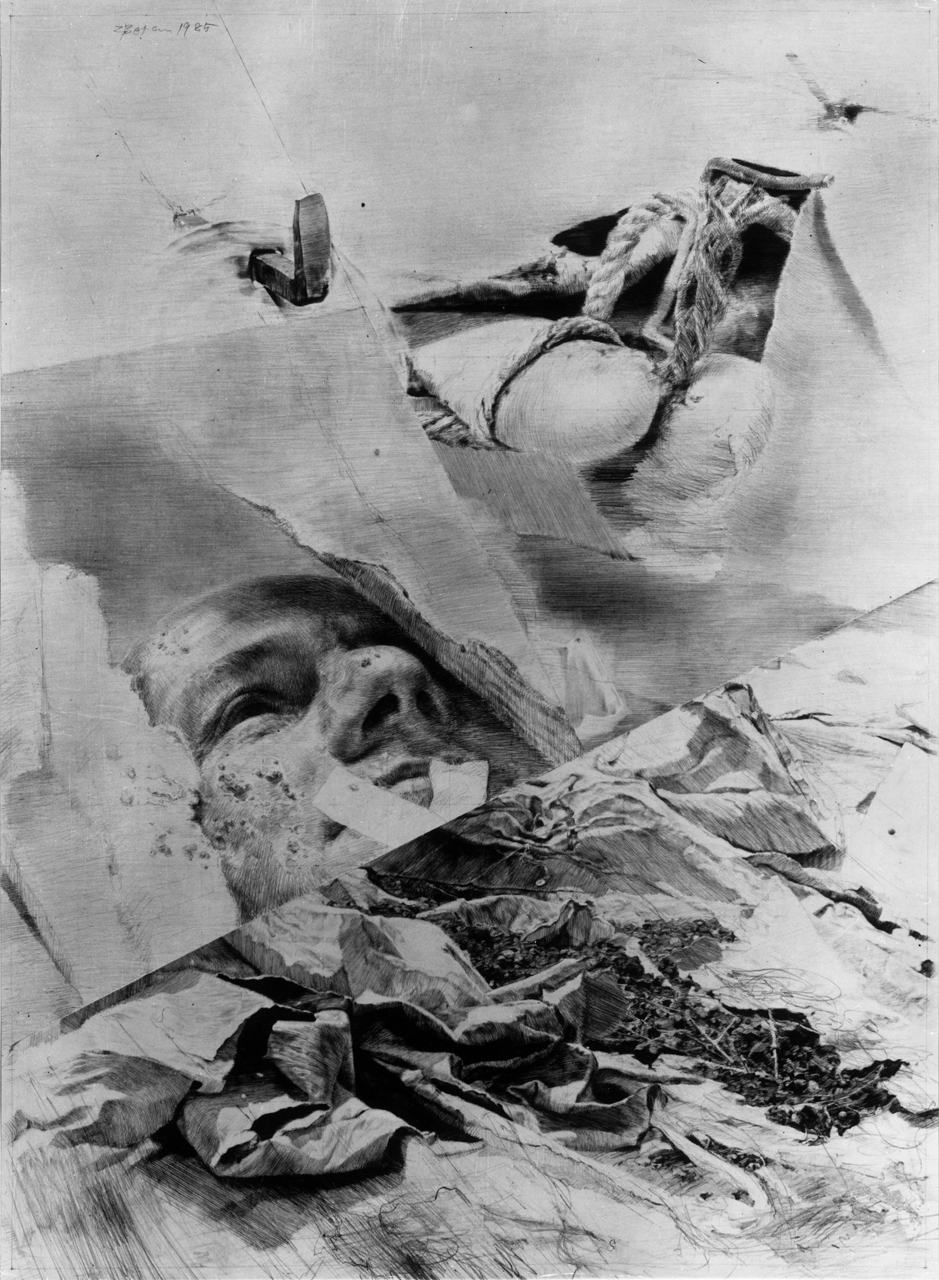
Head Study in General Position (1985)

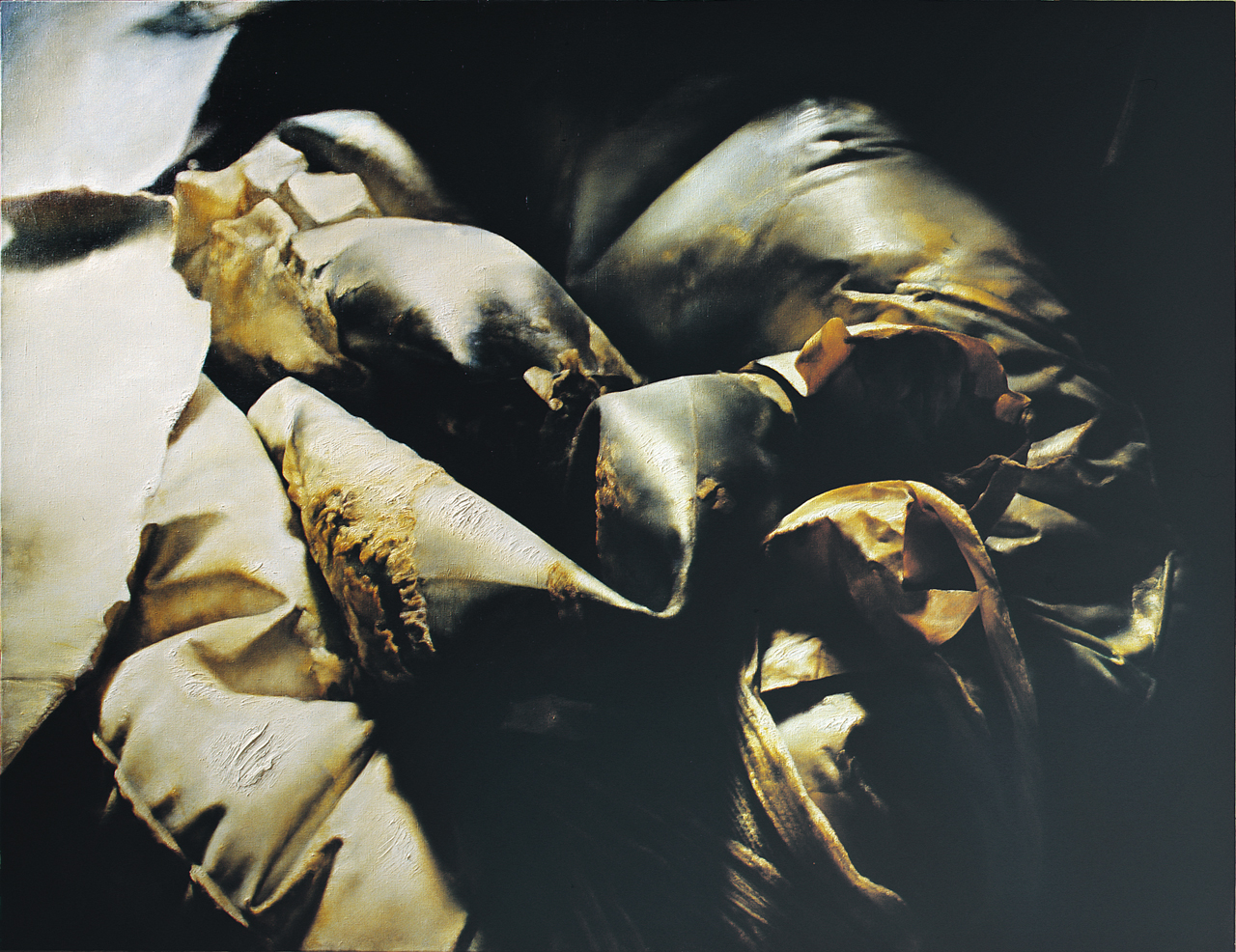
Attempted Mental Escape – Rather Down (1998)

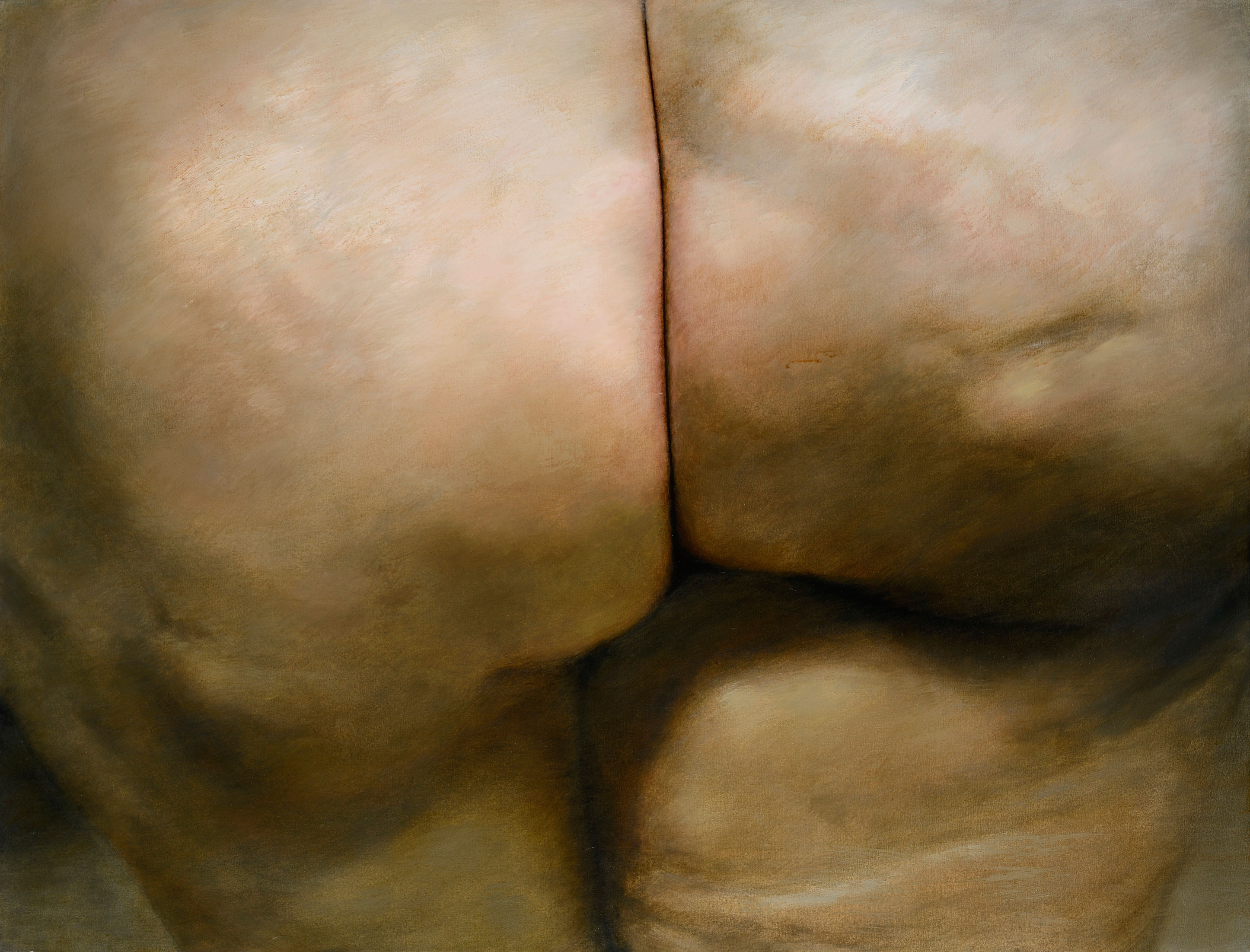
The Reverse Side of the Torso II (2005)

== Collections ==
- Centre Pompidou, Paris
- National Gallery Prague
- Moravian Gallery in Brno
- Aleš South Bohemian Gallery in Hluboká nad Vltavou
- Czech Museum of Fine Arts, Prague
- Gallery of the City of Prague
- Galerie Bayerrischer Wald, Zandt
- Gallery of Modern Art, Hradec Králové
- Ministerium of the International Avantgarde, Milan
- Museum of Art Olomouc
- Terezín Memorial, Terezín

== Exhibitions ==
=== Selected solo shows ===
- 2007 Zdeněk Beran - Retrospective, National Gallery in Prague

=== Selected group shows ===
- 1983 Dessins tchèques du 20e siècle, Centre Georges Pompidou, Paris
- 1991 Tradition und Avantgarde in Prag, Kunsthalle Osnabrück, Rheinisches Landesmuseum Bonn
- 1991 40 Artistes Tchèques et Slovaques 1960–1990, Museé des beaux-arts de la Ville de Reims
- 1999/2000 The Art of Accelerated Time. Czech Art Scene 1958 - 1968, Czech Museum of Fine Arts, Prague, Gallery of Fine Arts, Cheb
- 2002 Hyperrealism, Gallery of Modern Art, Hradec Králové
- 2003/2004 Art is abstraction. Czech Visual Culture of the 1960s, Prague Castle Riding Hall, Museum of Decorative Arts, Brno, Museum of Modern Art, Olomouc, Klatovy
- 2004/2005 La boîte en valise - oder Die Neue Welt liegt mitten in Europa, Kunstverein, Weiden, GAVU Prague, Akademie der Bildenden Künste Nürnberg
- 2006 Amor vincit omnia, Saarländische Galerie – Europäisches Kunstforum e.V., Berlin
- 2008/2009 Napříč generacemi: Praha - Norimberk - současné umění z partnerských měst, Clam-Gallas Palace, Prague, Im Querschnitt: Prag - Nürnberg - zeitgenössische Kunst aus den Partnerstädten, Kunsthaus im KunstKulturQuartier, Nürnberg
- 2008/2009 Transfer, White Box, Munich, House of Lords of Kunštát, Brno, New York
- 2017 Fascination with Reality - Hyperrealism in Czech Painting, Museum of Modern Art, Olomouc

Overview in: Information system abART: Zdeněk Beran, exhibitions

== Sources ==
=== Monographs and authors' catalogues ===
- Dana Mikulejská (ed.), Zdeněk Beran, monograph 323 p., texts by collective of authors, National Gallery in Prague 2007, ISBN 9788070353523
- Vlastimil Tetiva, Zdeněk Beran: Post retrospektiva / Post retrospective, Alšova jihočeská galerie v Hluboké nad Vltavou 2007, ISBN 80-86952-13-4
- Rea Michalová, Zdeněk Beran: Rodné hnízdo (po letech), Šmíra - Print, s.r.o., Ostrava 2014, ISBN 9788087427842

=== Catalogues and general sources ===
- Barbora Kundračíková (ed.), Fascinace skutečností – hyperrealismus v české malbě / Fascination with Reality - Hyperrealism in Czech Painting, Museum of Art Olomouc 2017, ISBN 9788088103219
- Vlasta Čiháková Noshiro, The Czech (Hyper)realism – prof. Zdeněk Beran and his disciples“ – private collection of Pavel Feigl (FEIGl GALLERY), 2016 on line
- Vlastimil Tetiva, České umění XX. století 1970-2007 / Czech Art of the XXth Century 1970–2007, 326 p., Alšova jihočeská galerie v Hluboké nad Vltavou 2008, ISBN 9788086952420
- Zaostalí forever / Backwards Forever, cat. of the exhibition in the Municipal Library of GHMP, 104 p., Gallery (Jar. Kořán) Prague 2007, ISBN 9788086990156
- Zdeněk Beran, Hody na pohřební hostině / Feast at a Funeral Banquet, In: České umění 1939–1999. Programy an impulzy, sborník sympozia, Vědecko-výzkumné pracoviště Akademie výtvarných umění v Praze / Programmes and Impulses, Proceedings of the Symposium, Scientific Research Institute of the Academy of Fine Arts in Prague 2000, pp. 94–99
- Mahulena Nešlehová (ed.), Poselství jiného výrazu: Pojetí informelu v českém umění 50. a první poloviny 60. let / The Message of Another Form of Expression: The Concept of Informel in Czech Art of the 1950s and First Half of the 1960s, BASE Publishing House, Artefact, Prague 1997, ISBN 8090248101 (BASE), ISBN 8090216005 (ArteFACT)
- František Šmejkal, České imaginativní umění / Czech Imaginative Art, (Jana Šmejkalová ed.), 693 p., Rudolfinum Gallery, Prague 1997, ISBN 8090219411
- Jindřich Chalupecký, Nové umění v Čechách / New Art in Bohemia, Jinočany, H & H 1994
- Marie Judlová (ed.). Ohniska znovuzrození: České umění 1956–1963 / Focal Points of Rebirth: Czech Art 1956–1963, Gallery of the Capital City of Prague, ÚDU AV ČR, 1994
- Karin Thomas, Tradition und Avantgarde in Prag. "Versuch in der Wahrheit zu leben.", Verlag: DuMont, Osnabrück 1991, ISBN 9783770128426
- Zaostalí / The Backwards, text by Jan Kříž, catalogue of prepared and unrealised exhibition in the People's House, unpaginated, OŠK ONV Praha 9, 1990
- Forum '88, text by Josef Hlaváček et al., 96 p., cat. of the exhibition in Holešovická tržnice, Prague 1988
- Jiří Sozanský (ed.), Pevnost / The Fortress, catalogue of a private symposium in the Small Fortress in Terezín in 1980, Ministry of Culture of the Czech Republic, Prague 1991
- František Šmejkal, Fantasijní aspekty současného českého umění / Fantasy Aspects of Contemporary Czech Art, Regional Gallery of the Highlands in Jihlava 1967

=== Encyclopedias ===
- Geneviève Bénamou, L'Art aujourd'hui en Tchécoslovaquie, 1979
- André Van Strijp, The image of Man in European Art since 1945, Fundatie Kunsthuis, Amsterdam
- Nová encyklopedie českého výtvarného umění / New Encyclopedia of Czech Visual Art, Prague, Academia 1995. 1103 p.

=== Other ===
- Pavel Nešleha, K Zaostalým krok za krokem / Toward Backwards, step by step, Výtvarné umění 3–4, 1995, pp. 95–101
- Stanislav Drvota, Osobnost a tvorba / Personality and Creation, Avicenum, Prague 1973
