= Ivan Bukovský =

Acad. painter Ivan Bukovský
- Bukovský in 2025
- Born: 7 July 1949 (age 77); Prague, Czechoslovakia
- Education: Academy of Fine Arts in Prague
- Awards: Prize for Drawing, 1st Triennial of Anti-War Drawings and Prints, Majdanek (1985) Fundación Barceló Award, Spain (1996) Critic's Award, Porto S'Elpidio, Italy (2008)
- Website: ivanbukovsky.com

Ivan Bukovský (born 7 July 1949) is a Czech painter, illustrator and pedagogue. He teaches art, painting and drawing, history and history of art. He is a leading figure in Czech figurative painting and the New Figuration movement. He is the recipient of several international awards for painting, the founder of the art society "Orbis pictus: Europa", and of the international project "The Infinite Painting".

== Life ==
Bukovský was born 7 July 1949, Prague. Both of his parents were secular Jews who met in the Theresienstadt Ghetto during World War II. His father, Otto Schwarz, was deported from Theresienstadt in 1944 to Auschwitz, where he survived to see liberation; his mother, Marianna, was sent through Theresienstadt, Ravensbrück and Bergen-Belsen. As a prewar communist, his father found employment after the war in the Press Department of the Ministry of Information and Education. In 1951, he was dismissed and interrogated; thereafter, until his retirement, he worked as an instructor for corporate journalists at Průmstav. His mother, who was fluent in German and English and had worked as a foreign-language correspondent and stenographer before the war, became a clerk in foreign trade after the war.

Ivan Bukovský grew up in a family environment influenced primarily by Christian culture and Greek mythology. He did not discover Jewish culture until he visited relatives in Israel in 1963. He painted from early childhood and, from 1964 to 1968, attended the Václav Hollar School of Fine Arts. At that time, the school focused primarily on commercial art and did not meet his expectations. He was employee for two years and briefly studied art history and aesthetics. In 1971, he was admitted to the Academy of Fine Arts in Prague to study in the studio of Prof. Jan Smetana. In 1974, he received the 17 November Student Award. In 1975, together with Jan Bouška, and in 1976 for the first time on his own, he exhibited at the small, unofficial gallery of the Nerudovka Theater. He participated in the significant generational "Exhibition of Young Artists" at Mánes (1976). After graduating from the Academy of Fine Arts (1976), he married in 1978 and moved first to Dobříš and later to Příbram.

In 1978, he participated in the unofficial generational group exhibition Confrontation at the Institute of Microbiology of the Czechoslovak Academy of Sciences. Together with his classmate from the Academy, Jiří Sozanský, he co-organized the first of three unofficial art symposia in Small Fortress in Terezín in 1980. Two days after it opened, an information embargo was imposed on the exhibition by order of the Communist Party of Czechoslovakia, but newspapers and television had already reported on it, and the ban actually increased attendance. Until the end of the 1980s, Bukovský exhibited mostly in smaller galleries outside Prague.

In 1961, he appeared in the short student film Králíček ('little rabbit') directed by Dušan Klein. From 1984 to 1990, he collaborated with Krátký film (Short film) Prague. In the early 1990s, he visited Italy at the invitation of the Lucchetti brothers and Israel in 1993.

From 1996 to 2003, he headed the graphic design program at the Secondary Vocational School and Higher Vocational School in Štětí; from 2003 to 2020, he taught high school students art history, history, and art education at the Příbram Waldorf School; and from 2020 – 2026, he taught figurative painting and drawing as a part-time teacher at the Faculty of Education at the University of South Bohemia in České Budějovice.

In 2001 he founded the art society Orbis pictus: Europa (abbreviated as OPE) with his friend Lubomír Pešek († 2022) . With the support of the then-senator for the Příbram region, Ing. Zdeněk Vojíř, and in collaboration with the Czech Centers, they launched an ambitious project titled The Infinite Canvas, later renamed to the more precise The Infinite Painting. The project was intended to be an expression of the artists' shared message for a vision of Europe in the third millennium and to contribute to the cultural integration of Europe. By 2005, it had taken place in fifteen European countries—the Netherlands, France, Austria, Germany, Italy, Romania, Ukraine, Slovakia, Poland, Bulgaria, Russia, Wales, Northern Ireland, Ireland, Sweden, and Hungary. In 2003 and 2004, the OPE arts organization received an award from the Director General of the Czech Centers for the best program in the visual arts.

The project consisted of a joint exhibition by Bukovský and Pešek with one or two local artists, while other artists created paintings on a 12-meter roll of canvas. Over the course of six years, approximately 500 artists participated, and nearly 400 meters of the "Endless Painting" were created. Another 100 meters or so were painted by children from children's homes. Eighty meters of the canvases are on display at the Vojna Memorial (Note: The Vojna Camp was built between 1947 and 1949 by German prisoners of war and was named after the nearby Vojna Hill. After the prisoners of war left—from mid-1949 through 1951—the camp began to serve as a forced-labor camp for political prisoners of the emerging communist regime. The prisoners were used primarily as slave laborers to extract uranium ore in nearby mines.), and the exhibition is regularly updated.

Ivan Bukovský lives and works in Příbram. He was a member of the Lipany art group (1991–1992), the SVU Mánes (1992–2013), and the Central Bohemian Association of Visual Artists. After leaving the SVU Mánes, he became a member of the Free Association M (founded in 2013).

=== Awards ===
- 1974 17 November Award, for students of the Academy of Fine Arts in Prague
- 1984 Special Prize, III: Triennial of Young Painters, Sofia
- 1985 Prize for Drawing, 1st Triennial of Anti-War Drawings and Prints, Majdanek (Poland)
- 1996 Fundación Barceló Prize (Spain)
- 2007 Jury Prize, Premio San Crispino (Italy)
- 2008 Critics' Prize, Porto S'Elpidio (Italy)
- 2015 "Identification Code of Slovakia" (IKS) Prize

== Work ==
Ivan Bukovský belongs to the younger generation of the broad movement known as Czech New Figuration, which originally emerged from Czech Informel and retained its existential foundations and expressiveness. It built upon the work of the founders of Czech modernism from the mid-1960s to respond in its own way to the atmosphere of normalization, in which hopelessness, social hypocrisy, and the absurdity of everyday life—sometimes bordering on the grotesque—were intertwined. This generation, which left school during the harsh Normalization period in the second half of the 1970s, found opportunities to exhibit only in unofficial galleries or those outside Prague. Any attempt to act independently was immediately met with bans.

Bukovský was influenced by Renaissance and Baroque painting, as well as by Rembrandt, Italian Civilismo, and European New Figuration. Like many of his contemporaries, his work responds to the psychologically intense paintings of Francis Bacon, the expressive paintings of Chaïm Soutine, and those of František Mertl.

Ivan Bukovský, Event at 11.58.06 (1973)

Ivan Bukovský, In the park (1974)

Ivan Bukovský, Good Evening (1975)

Ivan Bukovský, Reclining (1978)

Ivan Bukovský, Waiting (1980)

Even while still a student, Ivan Bukovský painted works that demonstrated a sense of monumental space, in which dramatically arranged compositions and powerful figurative gestures created a cohesive, scenographically composed arena.

In his early work, Bukovský drew inspiration from the world of rock music and student parties. A change occurred in 1977–1978, when, together with Jiří Sozanský, he traveled to the Small Fortress in Terezín to study archives and witness testimonies. During the subsequent three-month art symposium (1980), which was also attended by Zdeněk Beran, Oldřich Kulhánek, and Lubomír Janečka, they created installations in the former prison cells intended to evoke some of the horror experienced by the prisoners of the concentration camp. The communists correctly recognized that this was a mirror held up to any totalitarian regime, and so they first attempted to close the site and then ended the exhibition prematurely.

Bukovský reflects the bleak situation of the second half of the 1970s through motifs of walls and labyrinths from which one tries in vain to escape. Architectural elements—such as gray walls, tombstones, catafalques, shattered sarcophagi, stone pedestals, sacrificial altars, tables, and thrones—became a recurring feature in most of his paintings. These geometrically austere shapes divide the pictorial space vertically or horizontally, serving as both support and obstacle, or accentuating the dynamics of the action through diagonal divisions. They contrast with the figures and organic matter in general and draw attention to the central plot.

In the 1980s, Bukovský explored ordinary human situations from everyday life, but he saw himself as a mere observer of these phenomena and maintained an intellectual distance. Tetiva uses the term "interpretive images" to describe them. He found his subjects in the expressive gestures of figures in newspaper photographs or as conveyed by a black-and-white television screen. This was reflected in his subdued color palette, dominated by gray (Portrait, 1983; Retirement Home, 1983). The frontal shot and the apparent randomness of the figures' placement in the composition evoke a snapshot, capturing a moment in time focused solely on the essential elements of expression, gesture, or clothing. This "eye-to-eye" communication captures the truth of life uncompromisingly and without embellishment.

The characters' actions create an unsettling, even surreal impression and often depict some kind of extreme event. The motif of an accident and the subsequent brutal attempt to rescue the victim against her will (Accident, 1980, Crossing, 1981) speaks to the existential foundations of Bukovský's work. The apocalyptic vision of Mr. Oppenheimer's Laboratory (1980) explores humanity's futile efforts to control nature, which can only lead to catastrophe. In the second half of the 1980s, he went through a creative crisis and destroyed or repainted most of the paintings from that period.

Ivan Bukovský, Crossing (1981)

Ivan Bukovský, Retirement home (1982)

Ivan Bukovský, Interrelationships (1982)

Ivan Bukovský, An idylic scene (1983)

Ivan Bukovský, Rest area (1985)

It was not until the fall of the communist regime that his work received a new impetus. In the early 1990s, the theme of calamities became more prevalent in Bukovský's work, and the painter found parallels between the fate of individuals and that of all humanity in Old Testament stories and ancient myths. The Fall of Icarus became the subject of several paintings, serving as a broader parable of human pride (Ikaros, 2007), as did the prophets Jeremiah, Isaiah, and Job. The Ahasver series is based on an early portrait of the artist's father (originally his nickname during his imprisonment in Theresienstadt) and generalizes the theme of eternal restlessness without hope of death or salvation. Bukovský's family background was secular, and the Jewish themes in his work are rather a symbolic lament over the fall and destruction of the human race.

Isaiah (1993)

Interview (1994)

Abraham Speaks to God (2003)

Panta rhei (2004)

Fall (2004)

In the paintings created after 2000, a shift toward abstraction is evident. The figure is often merely hinted at; the focus is rather on the placement of shapes in space and the creation of a peculiar tension between the surface and space. Expressive painting depicts figures and the bodies of the dead amid toppled tombstones in the large-scale triptych Kaddish (2006–2007, 200 x 405 cm). In other paintings, figures are suggested as they plunge from a slanted surface under the force of gravity (Fall, 2009) or as mere streams of living organic matter seeping through gaps in stone architecture (Trash, 2009, Penetration, 2009, Separation, 2009). A haunting theme is that of sacrificial altars with a suggested torso (Story, 2009–2010) or simply indefinable organic forms of the same color, reminiscent of pieces of meat hanging on a hook (Sacrificial Site, 2015).

Play with fire (2007)

Icarus (2007)

Salome (2008)

Interview (2010)

Report (2010)

And Abraham came (2014)

Madonna (2014–2015)

Sacrificial Site (2016)

Cleaning (2023)

Secret of the Moriah Mountain (2026)

Alongside his figurative works, he is creating a series of abstract drawings on a uniform brick-red background, in which the figure is merely hinted at. The dominant visual element is the contrast between the asphalt-black underlayer, white tones fading into brownish hues, and irregular red linear markings created by dripping.

In his artistic manifesto, Bukovský states: The purpose of art is to seek order and create balance in the chaos that surrounds us. Art is the guardian of the mystery from which it draws its source. It is not meant for decoration, but to grab a person by the scruff of the neck and drag them through thorns.

=== Representation in collections (selection) ===
- National Gallery Prague
- Yad Vashem, Jerusalem
- Gallery of the Central Bohemian Region in Kutná Hora
- North Bohemian Gallery of Fine Arts in Litoměřice
- Gallery of Fine Arts in Cheb
- Aleš South Bohemian Gallery in Hluboká nad Vltavou
- Klatovy / Klenová Gallery
- Terezín Memorial
- Majdanek State Museum
- Karl Fleischmann Gallery, Nová Včelnice
- private collections in the Czech republic and abroad

=== Exhibitions (selection) ===
==== Author's ====
- 1975 Jan Bouška, Ivan Bukovský: Obrazy / Paintings, Theatre in Nerudova street, Prague
- 1976 Ivan Bukovský: Obrazy / Paintings, Theatre in Nerudova street, Prague
- 1978 Ivan Bukovský, Pod podloubím Gallery, Olomouc
- 1981 Ivan Bukovský: Obrazy / Paintings, Small gallery, Liberec
- 1982 Ivan Bukovský: Obrazy / Paintings, MKS Dobříš
- 1987 Ivan Bukovský: Obrazy / Paintings, Gallery of Fine Arts in Cheb
- 1993 Ivan Bukovský, City Museum Merzig, City Museum Karlsruhe
- 1993 Ivan Bukovský, Caerano s. Marco, Treviso (with J. Heller)
- 1995 Ivan Bukovský: Pláč Jeremiášův / Cry of Jeremiah, Litera Gallery, Prague
- 1996 Ivan Bukovský, Ernestinum, Příbram (with P. Turnajský)
- 1997 Ivan Bukovský, Terezín Memorial
- 2000 Ivan Bukovský, Studio Paměť / Memory, Prague
- 2004 Ivan Bukovský, Moscow New Manege (with A. Tokarev)
- 2006 Ivan Bukovský, Galéria Merum (Arias & Vanda Gallery), Modra
- 2007 Ivan Bukovský: Obrazy / Paintings, Magna Gallery, Ostrava, National Museum, Bratislava
- 2009 Ivan Bukovský: Ohlédnutí / Looking back, Ernestinum, Příbram
- 2010 Ivan Bukovský: Útržky příběhů / Fragments of stories, Beseda Gallery, Ostrava
- 2012 Ivan Bukovský: Obrazy / Paintings, Dorka Gallery, Domažlice
- 2012 Ivan Bukovský: Obrazy z posledních let / Pictures from Recent Years, Topičova salon, Prague
- 2014/2015 Ivan Bukovský: Obrazy / Paintings, Town Museum and Art Gallery, Hranice
- 2016 Ivan Bukovský: Tableaux, Centre culturel tcheque de Paris
- 2017 Ivan Bukovský: Obrazy / Paintings, Semily Museum and Pojizerská Gallery
- 2017 Ivan Bukovský: Androgynní povaha bytí / The Androgynous Nature of Existence, Gallery of Fine Arts in Most
- 2018 Ivan Bukovský, Strahov Monastery, Prague
- 2018 Ivan Bukovský, D Gallery, Prague
- 2019 Ivan Bukovský, New Town Hall, Prague
- 2019 Ivan Bukovský: Je těžké být Bohem / It's Hard to Be God, Ernestinum Příbram
- 2020 Ivan Bukovský: 70, Queen Anne's Summer Palace (Belvedere) Prague
- 2020 Ivan Bukovský: Berešit - Svědkové a proroci / Bereishit - Witnesses and Prophets, Synagogue na Palmovce, Prague
- 2021 City Gallery Olomouc (with T. Měšťánek)
- 2022 Klášter Chotěšov (with P. Janouškovec and B. Jirků)
- 2022 Sýpka Gallery, Chomutov (with P. Janouškovec)
- 2023 Jakubec Gallery, Prague
- 2024 Prácheňské muzeum Písek
- 2025 Fons Gallery, Pardubice (with P. Janouškovec and B. Jirků)
- 2025 Portheimka, Prague (with K. Navrátil)
- 2025 Beseder Gallery (with Alisa Omer)
- 2026 ZCastle Gallery Rožmitál
- 2026 Galerie pod točnou, Kolín (with L. Vilhelmová)
Terezín - in conclusion (2015)

Strahov Monastery, Prague (2018)

It's Hard to Be God, Ernestinum Příbram (2019)

70, Queen Anne's Summer Palace (Belvedere) Prague (2020)

==== Collective ====
- 1975 Obrazy / Paintings, Theatre in Nerudova street, Prague
- 1978 Konfrontace / Confrontation, Institute of Microbiology, Czech Academy of Sciences, Prague
- 1980 Terezín '80, Terezín Memorial
- 1983 Salon d'automne, Paris
- 1986/1987 České umění 20. století / Czech art of the 20th century, Aleš South Bohemian Gallery in Hluboká nad Vltavou
- 1988 Jeden starší – jeden mladší. Obrazy, sochy, realizace / One older - one younger. Paintings, Sculptures, Realizations, Lidový dům, Prague
- 1990 Výtvarné tendence / Artistic Trends, Central Bohemian gallery, Prague
- 1991 Lipany poprvé: Kresby, grafika, drobná plastika / Lipany for the first time; Drawings, prints, small sculpture, Fronta Gallery, Prague
- 1993 Skutečnost a iluze / Reality and illusion, Castle Hluboká nad Vltavou
- 1995 Mánes Mánesu, Mánes, Prague
- 1996 Umění zastaveného času / Art when time stood still: The Czech Art Scene, 1969–1985, Prague, Brno, Cheb
- 2000 Dva konce století 1900 2000 / Two Turn-of-the-Century Periods: 1900 and 2000, House of the Black Madonna, Prague
- 2004 Jubilanti Spolku výtvarných umělců Mánes / Jubilarians of the Mánes Association of Visual Artists 2004, Diamant Gallery, Prague
- 2007/2008 České umění XX. století: 1970–2007 / Czech art of the 20th century 1970-2007, Aleš South Bohemian Gallery in Hluboká nad Vltavou
- 2008/2009 Středočeské sdružení výtvarníků: Členská výstava 2008 / Central Bohemian Association of Visual Artists: 2008 Members' Exhibition, Mladá Boleslav, Karviná, Rakovník, Beroun
- 2009 Jubilanti Mánesa 2009 / Jubilarians of the Mánes 2009, Diamant Gallery, Prague
- 2011 Nord Art, Büdelsdorf
- 2014–2017 Stavy mysli / Za obrazem / States of Mind / Behind the Image, Gallery of the Central Bohemian Region, Kutná Hora
- 2015 Jiří Sozanský, Ivan Bukovský: Terezín - in conclusion, Small Fortress Terezín
- 2018 Jan Smetana a jeho škola / and his school, Gallery of the Central Bohemian Region, Kutná Hora
- 2022 Volné sdružení M (Pocta P. Šmahovi) The M Free Association (A Tribute to P. Šmaha), COCO Gallery, Dobrš
- 2024 Pedagogové a posluchači: Akademie výtvarných umění v Praze 1969-1989 / Professors and Students: Academy of Fine Arts in Prague, 1969–1989, Gallery of Fine Arts in Cheb
- 2025 Živly: Odraz fenoménu ve výtvarném umění / The Elements: A Reflection of the Phenomenon in the Visual Arts, Semily Museum and Pojizerská Gallery
- 2026 Radosti života: 24 x jinak / The Joys of Life: 24 Different Ways, Semily Museum and Pojizerská Gallery

== Sources ==
=== Catalogues (selection) ===
- Souborný katalog výstav, Divadlo v Nerudovce / Comprehensive Catalog of Exhibitions, Nerudovka Theater, Prague 1980
- Ivan Bukovský: Obrazy / Paintings, text Karpaš Roman, 8 p., OKS Liberec 1981
- Ivan Bukovský: Obrazy / Paintings, text Jaroslav Vančát, 20 p., Gallery of Fine Arts in Cheb 1987
- Ivan Bukovsky: Dipinti, text Chin Lucio, Tetiva Vlastimil, 38 + (4) p., Treviso 1993
- Vlastimil Tetiva, Skutečnost a iluze. Tendence českého radikálního realismu / Reality and Illusion: Trends in Czech Radical Realism, 170 p., AJG Hluboká 1993, ISBN 80-900633-2-2
- Ivan Bukovský: Pláč Jeremiášův / Jeremiah´s Cry, Litera Gallery, Prague 1995
- Ivan Bukovský, text Drury Richard Frederick, Magna Gallery, Ostrava 2007 On line
- Ivan Bukovský: Ohlédnutí / Looking back, text Kříž Jan, Rejžek Jan, 16 p., Příbram Castle 2009
- Ivan Bukovský: Útržky příběhů / Fragments of stories, text Jiří Pometlo, Beseda Gallery, Ostrava 2010
- Ivan Bukovský: Retrospective, texts Bohumír Bachratý et al., 171 p. ̟ CD, Příbram 2014
- Ivan Bukovský: Obrazy / Paintings, text Bachratý B, Moza L, Drury, R, 24 p., 2019
- Ivan Bukovský: Obrazy / Paintings, text Chin Lucio, Hansen Hannes, Neumann Ivan, Tetiva Vlastimil, 20 p., undated

=== Encyclopedias ===
- Milan Hlaveš: Ivan Bukovský, in: Anděla Horová (ed), The New Czech Encyclopedia of Fine Arts (Supplements), p. 128, Academia, publishing house of the Academy of Sciences of the Czech Republic 2006, ISBN 80-200-1209-5
- Marie Klimešová: Od nové figurace k nové expresi a grotesce, 12/15 / From New Figuration to New Expression and the Grotesque, 12/15, in: Platovská Marie, Rostislav Švácha (eds.). Dějiny českého výtvarného umění / History of Czech Fine Arts VI/2, 1958-2000, pp. 691-714, Academia, Prague 2007 ISBN 978-80-200-1488-8
