= Dolní Dobrouč =

- Municipality
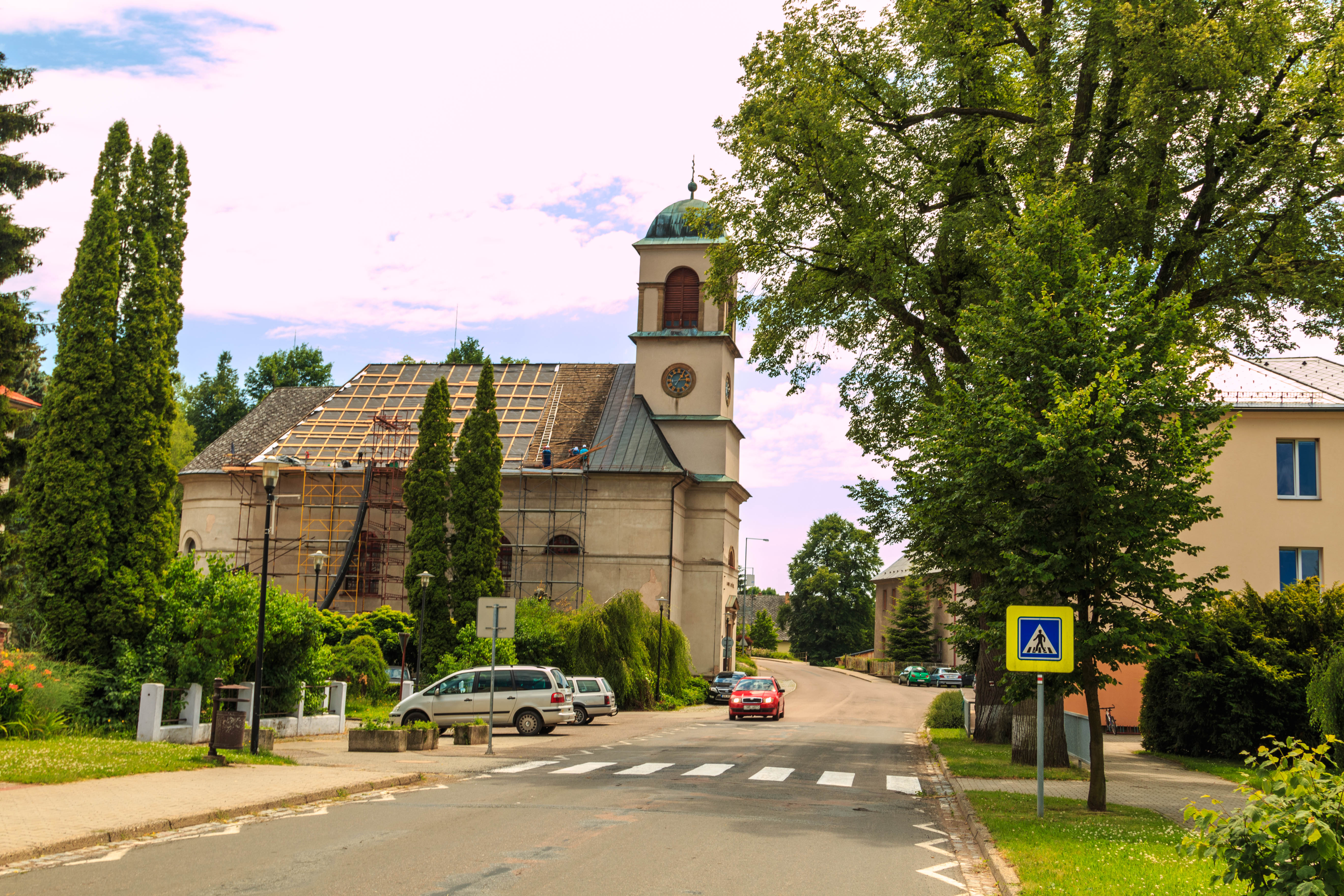
- Church of Saint Nicholas

- Flag Coat of arms

- Location in the Czech Republic
- Coordinates: 49°59′34″N 16°29′52″E
- Country: Czech Republic
- Region: Pardubice
- District: Ústí nad Orlicí
- First mentioned: 1292

Area
  - Total: 30.71 km^{2} (11.86 sq mi)
- Elevation: 365 m (1,198 ft)

Population (2026-01-01)
  - Total: 2,553
  - Density: 83.13/km^{2} (215.3/sq mi)
- Time zone: UTC+1 (CET)
  - Summer (DST): UTC+2 (CEST)
- Postal codes: 561 02, 562 01
- Website: www.dolnidobrouc.cz

Dolní Dobrouč (German: Liebenthal) is a municipality and village in Ústí nad Orlicí District in the Pardubice Region of the Czech Republic. It has about 2,600 inhabitants.

== Administrative division ==
Dolní Dobrouč consists of three municipal parts (in brackets population according to the 2021 census):

- Dolní Dobrouč (2,055)
- Horní Dobrouč (257)
- Lanšperk (128)

== Etymology ==
The oldest documented name of the village was Ditrichsbach, meaning "Dietrich's stream" in German. It was the name of the stream near which the village was founded, and the name was transferred to the village. Already from 1304, the German name of the village was Libenthal (from the 19th century appearign as Liebenthal). This name was derived from the phrase im lieben Thal ('in a lovely valley').

The Czech name Dobrouč has been used from the 16th century and was derived from the personal name Dobrút. In the 16th century, two villages began to be distinguished: Dolní Dobrouč ('lower Dobrouč') and Horní Dobrouč ('upper Dobrouč').

== Geography ==
Dolní Dobrouč is located about 7 kilometres (4 mi) east of Ústí nad Orlicí and 50 km (31 mi) east of Pardubice. It lies mostly in the Orlické Foothills, but it extends into the Svitavy Uplands in the west. The highest point is the hill Kamenný vrch at 570 m (1,870 ft) above sea level. The Tichá Orlice River forms the northwestern municipal border. The village is located in the valley of the Dobroučka Stream, which is a tributary of the Tichá Orlice.

== History ==
The Lanšperk Castle was founded during the colonisation of this area by King Ottokar II in the second half of the 13th century. The first written mention of Lanšperk is from 1285, when King Wenceslaus II donated it to Záviš of Falkenstein. The first written mention of Dolní Dobrouč is from 1292, when King Wenceslaus II donated the Lanšperk estate to the newly established Zbraslav Monastery. In 1343, the estate was acquired by the Olomouc bishopric, then in 1356 it was transferred to the Litomyšl bishopric.

From 1451 to 1506, the Lanšperk estate was owned by the Kostka of Postupice family, then they sold it to the Pernštejn family, who ruled it until 1588. From 1588 to 1622, the estate was in possession of the Hrzán of Harasov family. The Liechtenstein family bought the estate in 1622 and owned it until the 1920s. In 1873, Dolní Dobrouč was promoted to a market town, but the municipality lost the title during World War II.

== Demographics ==
Historical population

Year	Pop.	±%
1869	3,413	—
1880	3,358	−1.6%
1890	3,440	+2.4%
1900	3,139	−8.8%
1910	3,206	+2.1%

Year	Pop.	±%
1921	2,801	−12.6%
1930	2,819	+0.6%
1950	2,424	−14.0%
1961	2,561	+5.7%
1970	2,557	−0.2%

Year	Pop.	±%
1980	2,409	−5.8%
1991	2,390	−0.8%
2001	2,564	+7.3%
2011	2,534	−1.2%
2021	2,440	−3.7%

Source: Censuses

== Transport ==
Dolní Dobrouč is located on the railway line Ústí nad Orlicí–Červená Voda. The municipality is served by two train stations: Dolní Dobrouč and Lanšperk.

== Sights ==
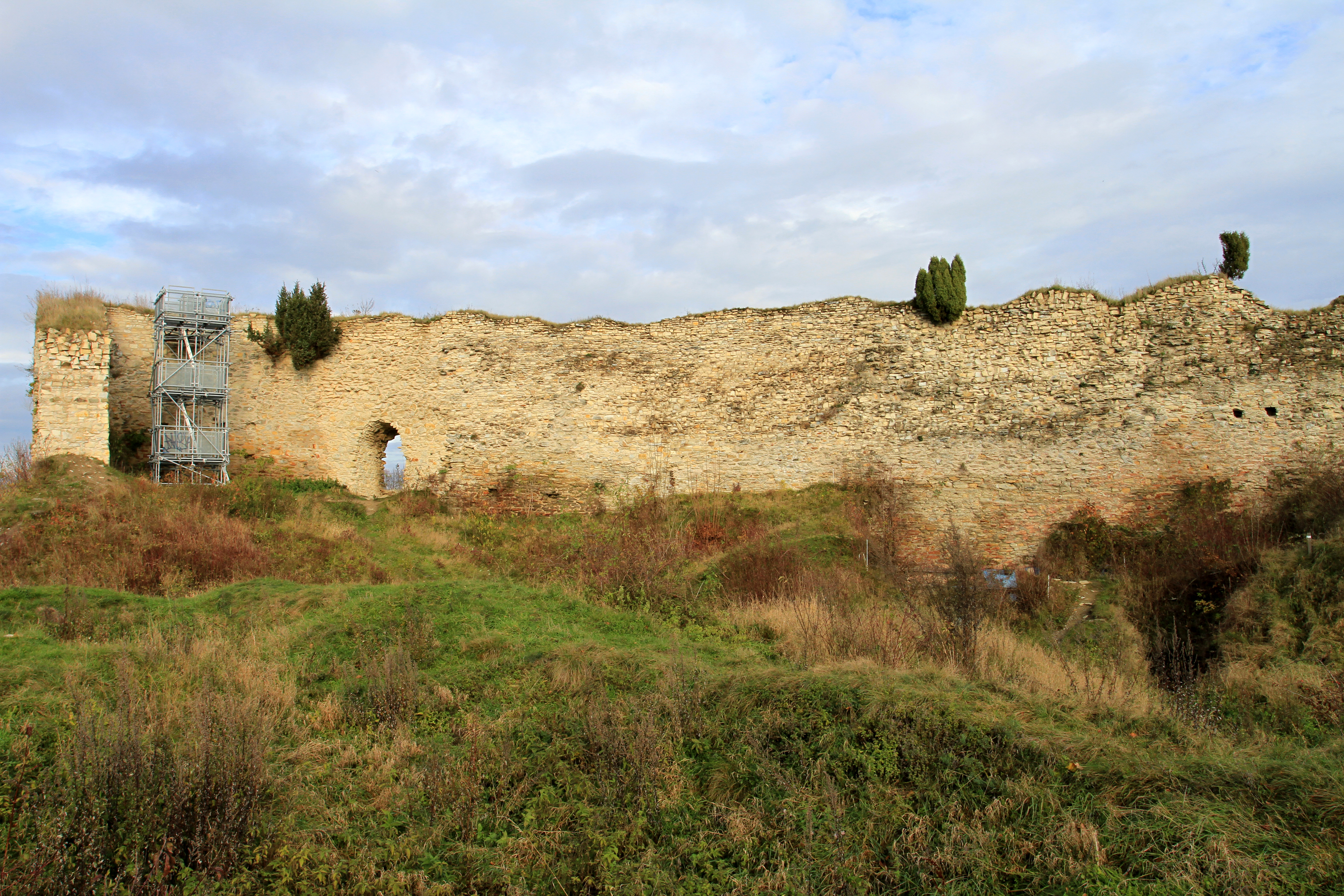
Ruin of the Lanšperk Castle

The main landmark of Dolní Dobrouč is the Church of Saint Nicholas. It was built in the Empire style in 1828–1829.

The Lanšperk Castle was probably founded in the mid-13th century. It became a ruin at the turn of the 16th and 17th centuries. Today the ruin is freely accessible to the public.

== Notable people ==
- Zdeněk Beran (1937–2014), painter
- Kamil Vacek (born 1987), footballer; raised here
- Šimon Falta (born 1993), footballer

== Twin towns – sister cities ==
Dolní Dobrouč is twinned with:

- Rovereto, Italy
