= Dušan Mravec =

Slovak painter (born 1980)

Dusan Mravec
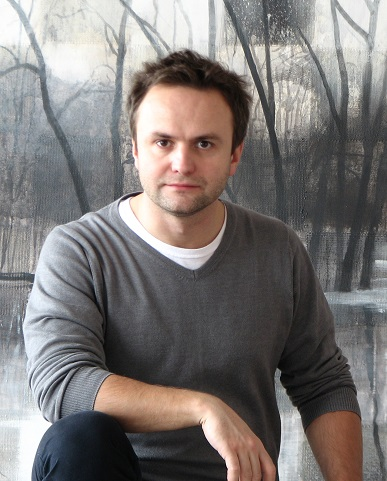
- Born: December 15, 1980 (age 45); Žilina, Czechoslovakia
- Known for: Painting
- Website: www.dusanmravec.com

Dusan Mravec (born 15 December 1980, Žilina) is a Slovak painter.

== Life ==
He studied at the Academy of Fine Arts, Prague v Prague in the intermedia studio of Prof. Milan Knížák, in the classical painting studio of Prof. Zdeněk Beran and in the studio of conceptual tendencies Prof. Miloš Šejn. He was also studying at the Royal Academy of Fine Arts (Antwerp) in Belgium.

== Work ==
His paintings in general are realistic or photorealistic. Sometimes we can see in his work hyperrealistic and expressionistic tendencies. He became well known for his big scaled canvases of still lifes of things he found in grandfather's house or in antique shops. These objects remind him the people. And therefore he is painting them so big. This personification of objects is one of the way Mravec is dealing with the classic motif of still life. In this way he is expressing them as a persons and these works can be called portraits as well. Other strong interest is focused on landscapes, but not exactly in a traditional way, but with other intention. His paintings of landscapes are contemplations about human behavior and intervention in nature and Mravec is telling this story in his poetic way of expression. Human paths, roads, highways or ways of thinking, memories and visions are the subjects of perception in his paintings of nature and humans in it.

== Residence ==
In 2012 he was chosen as an artist in residence through JCE-Jeune Création Européenne in Montrouge, France. His work was exposed at the JCE biennial in Montrouge and then in other places in Europe such as Kunsthaus in Hamburg, Museu Municipal Amadeo de Souza Cardoso in Amarante-Porto in Portugal, Salzburg, Pécs, Klaipėda and in Bratislava City Gallery in Bratislava.

== Works in state collection ==
- National Gallery in Prague, Czech republic
- Benedict Rejt gallery, Louny, Czech republic
