= Tomáš Kubík =

Tomáš Kubík may refer to:

- Tomáš Kubík (footballer, born 1992), Slovak football player
- Tomáš Kubík (footballer, born 2002), Slovak football player
- Tomáš Kubík (painter) (born 1977), Czech painter
