= Tomáš Kubík (painter) =

Czech painter (born 1977)

Acad. painter Tomáš Kubík
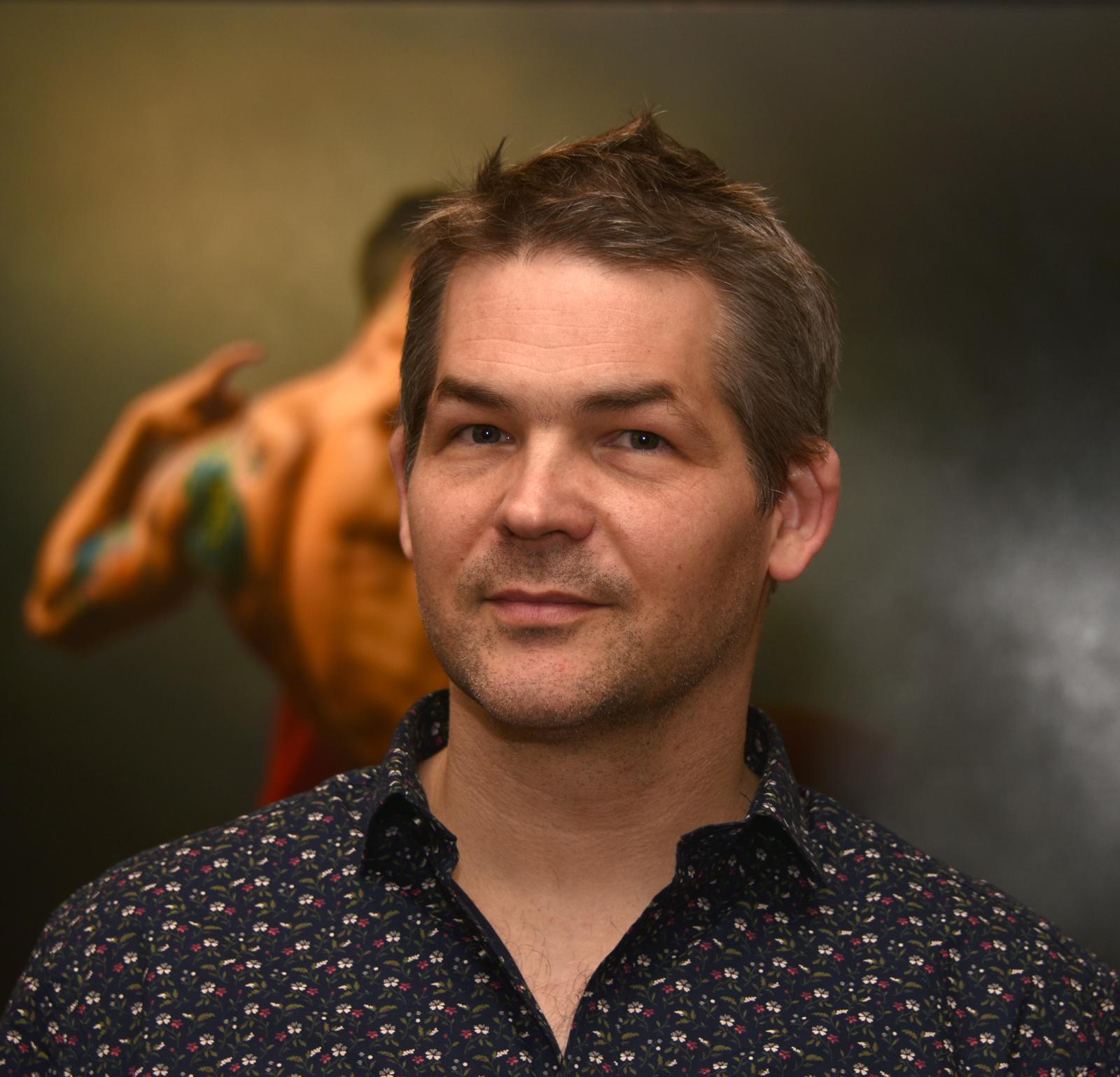
- Tomáš Kubík (2021)
- Born: 15 October 1977 (age 48); Pelhřimov, Czechoslovakia
- Education: Academy of Fine Arts, Prague
- Known for: painter, teacher
- Awards: Minister of Education's prize (2000), Burke's Peerage Foundation Award for Classically Inspired Portraiture (2021)

Tomáš Kubík (born 15 October 1977) is a Czech painter. He is graduate of the Studio of Classical Painting Techniques of Prof. Zdeněk Beran at the Academy of Fine Arts in Prague. Formerly, he was also active in dance and movement theatre, played the flute and worked as a teacher at a private painting school he co-founded.

== Life ==
Tomáš Kubík comes from a family of an artist, advertising graphic designer and director of the local cultural centre in Pelhřimov, who led both his sons to visual arts and music. After finishing primary school he attended the Václav Hollar Art School in Prague in 1992–1996, where he mastered graphic techniques, modelling and photography in addition to drawing and painting. He went to copy masterpieces at the National Gallery and painted landscapes in the open air with his classmate Zdeněk Daňek. Since his youth he has played the flute.

After graduating from secondary art school he was admitted to the Studio of Classical Painting Techniques of Prof. Zdeněk Beran at the Academy of Fine Arts in Prague. His classmates at that time were Markéta Urbanová, Dagmar Hamsíková, Jan Mikulka, Marek Slavík and Daniel Pitín. During the six years that Kubík spent in Beran's studio (1996–2002), he was able to fully exercise his extraordinary technical skills and his natural inclination towards the work of the old masters. He devoted himself mainly to still life painting and live model drawing, and his works, including his earliest ones, were regularly exhibited at the Academy of Fine Arts for their extraordinary bravura of execution. The school offered opportunities for internships abroad, which he took full advantage of, visiting exhibitions of Rembrandt, Caravaggio and Michelangelo during his studies. He was also influenced by contemporary artists such as Francis Bacon and Lucian Freud, and therefore continued his studies at the Milan Knížák Studio of Intermedia in 2002–2004.

During his studies, Tomáš Kubík was already recognised as an exceptional talent when in his second year he received the Atelier Prize and the academyRector's Prize (1998) and in 2000 the Minister of Education's prize for exceptional achievements in painting. In the same year, he succeeded in the competition for a representative portrait of Karel Malý for the portrait gallery of the rectors of Charles University in Karolinum. His painting Scenes from Married Life was purchased by the National Gallery in Prague in 2004. Paintings from his first foreign exhibition in the USA (2002), which received excellent reviews in the local press, were sold off to private collections.

After graduating from the academy, he became active in Dance and movement theatre but never abandoned painting and painted smaller formats, portrait commissions, illustrations and storyboards/comics for advertising and film agencies. He later used his experience with digital painting and its combination with photomontage (matte painting) to prepare compositions in the Michelangelo project.

In 2017 he got married and in 2019 his son Nicholas was born. Tomáš Kubík also works as a teacher of painting. In 2010, he began taking students for individual painting lessons in his studio and in 2012 he co-founded an art school in Prague 1, which he ran until 2018. At that time, he left his shares to his partner so that he could devote himself entirely to painting.

Tomáš Kubík's first participation in a competition organised by the Royal Society of Portrait Painters in London brought him a special Award for Classically Inspired Portraiture (Highly Commended) from Burke's Peerage Foundation in 2021 for his portrait of David in the Renaissance style. The jury also selected another portrait by Kubík, Valeria, for the competition. In 2021, Kubík's painting Inner Rage was selected for the European Museum of Modern Art's (MEAM) annual show in Barcelona, Figurativas 2021.

=== Awards ===
- 1998 Atelier Prize and the AVU Rector's Prize
- 2000 Minister of Education's prize
- 2021 Burke's Peerage Foundation Award for Classically Inspired Portraiture

== Work ==
During his studies at secondary school, Tomáš Kubík painted en plein air and gravitated towards impressionist painting. In his first year at the academy, he devoted himself mostly to still life painting, and in his first series of paintings, which began originally in a post-impressionist style after Cézanne, he switched to realistic Trompe-l'œil painting as the arranged apples gradually deteriorated. Eventually, a series of five still lifes with apples and compotes on a checkered wool blanket, entitled "Study of Decomposition" (1997), was created on this theme. His veristic still lifes depict mostly quite ordinary objects, such as a dry aloe in a pot (Still Life with Cactus, 1997) or bunches of onions (Onions I and II, 1997, 1998), entirely in keeping with the aesthetic advocated by Prof. Beran.

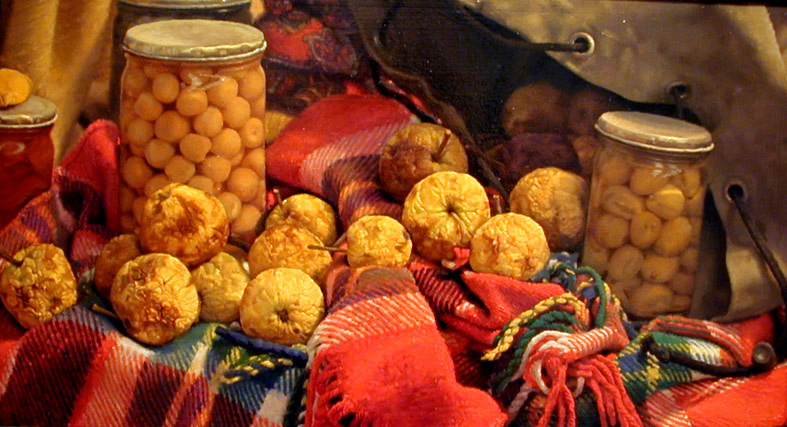
Still Life with Apples, From the cycle "Study of Decomposition", oil painting on panel, 20x50 cm, 1997

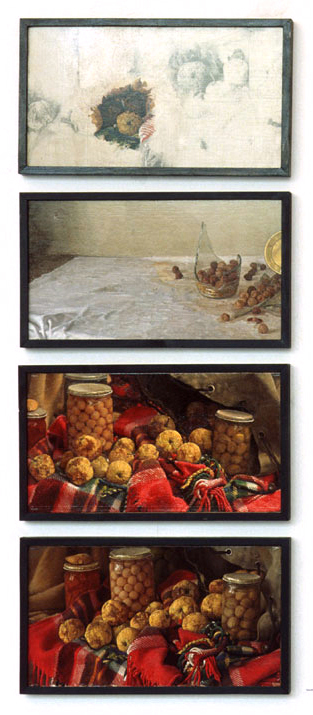
Cycle "Study of Decomposition"

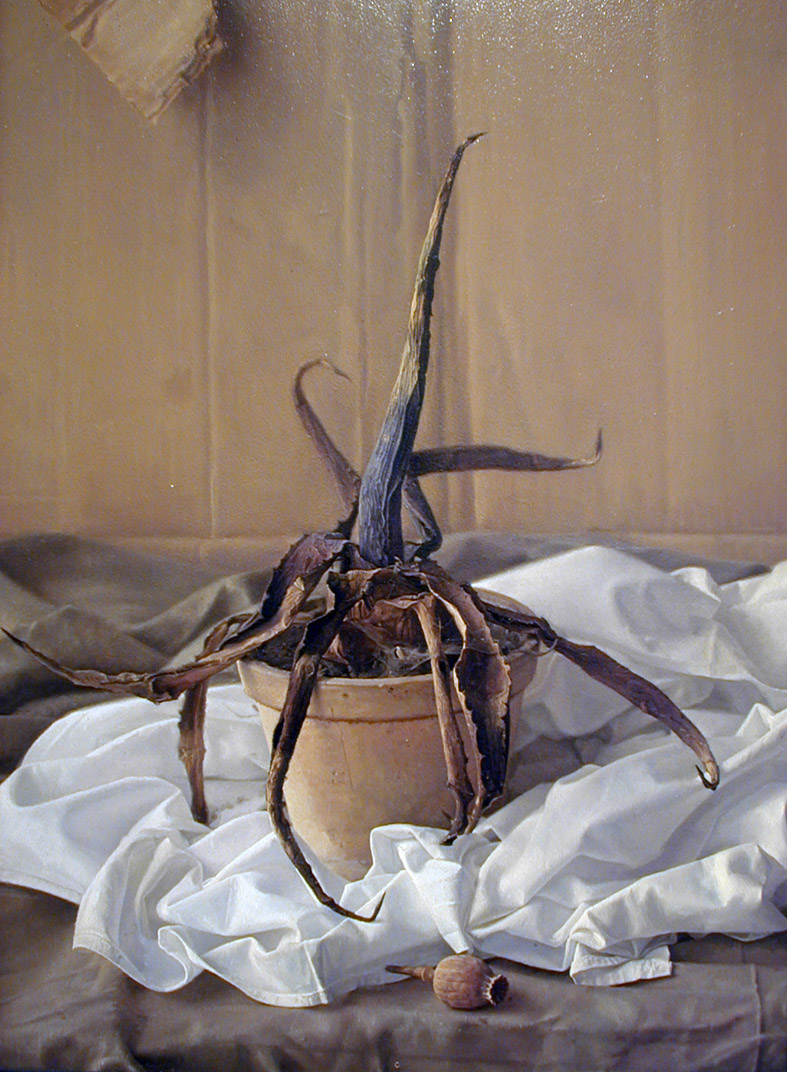
Still Life with Cactus, 1997, oil painting on panel, 60x45 cm, 1997

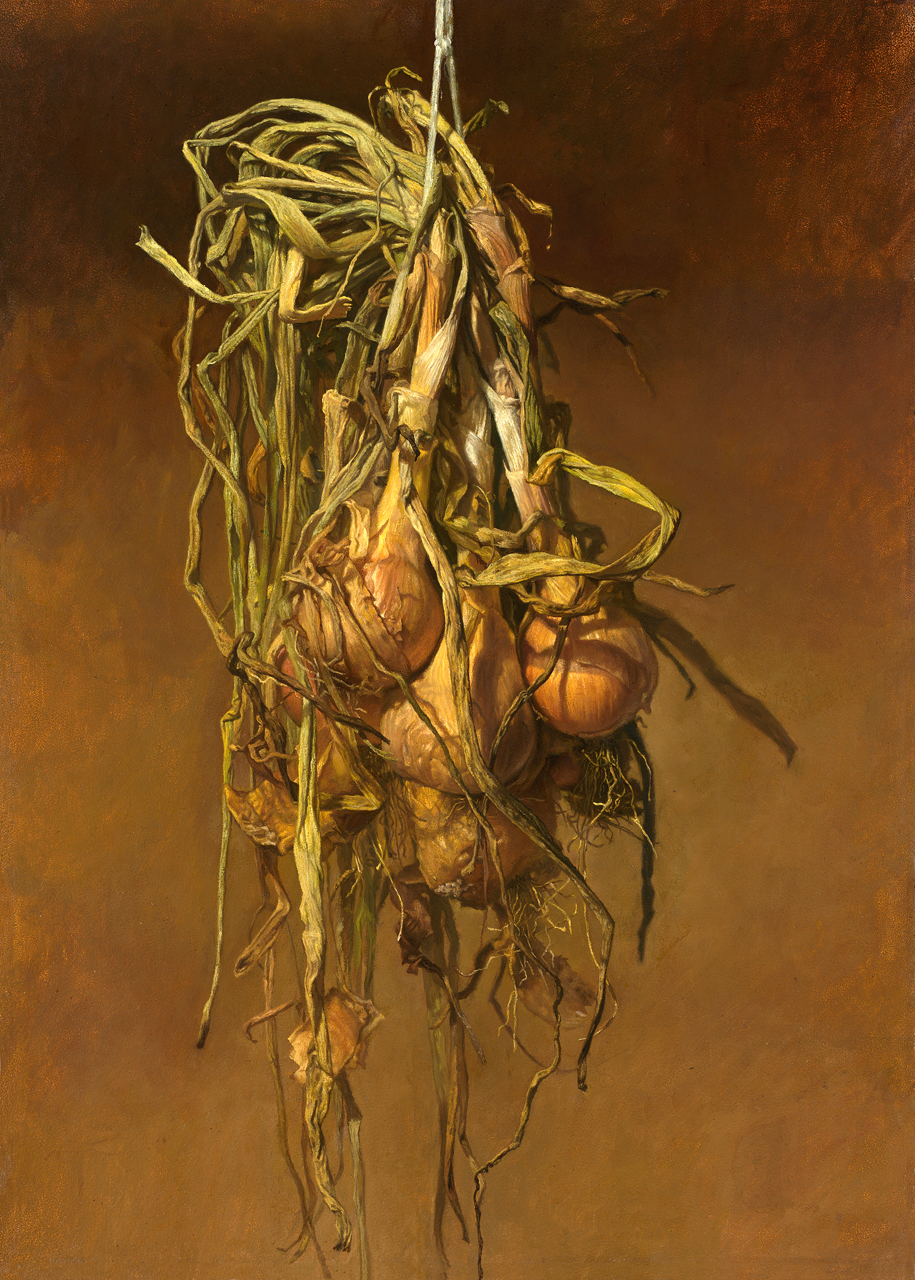
Onion I., oil painting on panel, 60x45 cm, 1997

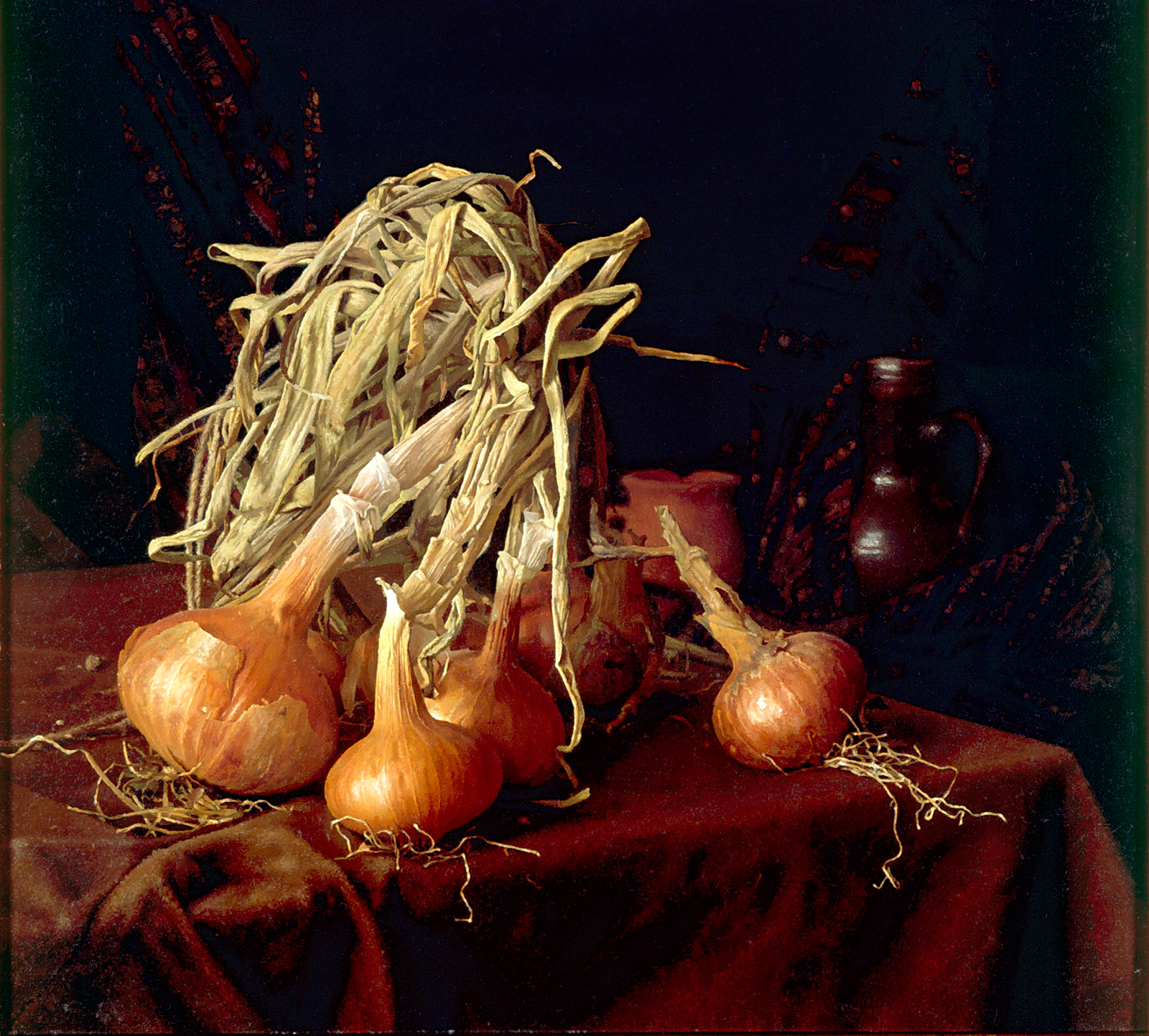
Onion II, 1998, oil painting on panel, 60x45 cm, 1998

Foreign travels and immediate impressions of paintings by Rembrandt, Caravaggio or Michelangelo, as well as the Belvedere Torso, were a significant inspiration for his own work. The marble Greek torso from the first century BC influenced generations of artists, starting with the Italian Renaissance, with its perfection (Tomáš Kubík, Belvedere Torso I, from the series "Michelangelo Project", 2020).

Kubík moved on to portrait painting with an extensive series of portrait studies of his expressions in the mirror, which he eventually translated into the "group self-portrait" Clone (1998-1999), in which he repeats the self-portrait several times in a kind of deaf-mute flurry, studying his own face in a complex lighting regime. Here he applied Rembrandt's psychologization of figures, Caravaggio's chiaroscuro and the attention to detail and imitation of folk types characteristic of Dutch paintings. Kubík's figurative painting is characterised by the contrast between neo-Baroque theatricality and the psychological uncertainty or ironic self-examination of figures reacting to the outside world. He then used the self-portrait again in a series of preparatory sketches for a portrait of a soldier wearing a tank helmet (Self-Portrait in Helmet, 1997–1998), in The Large Self-Portrait in the Studio (1997), in a portrait study after Vermeer (Vermeer's Saliva, 1997–1998), or in the expressive composition Inner Rage - Self-Portrait with dummy (2001).

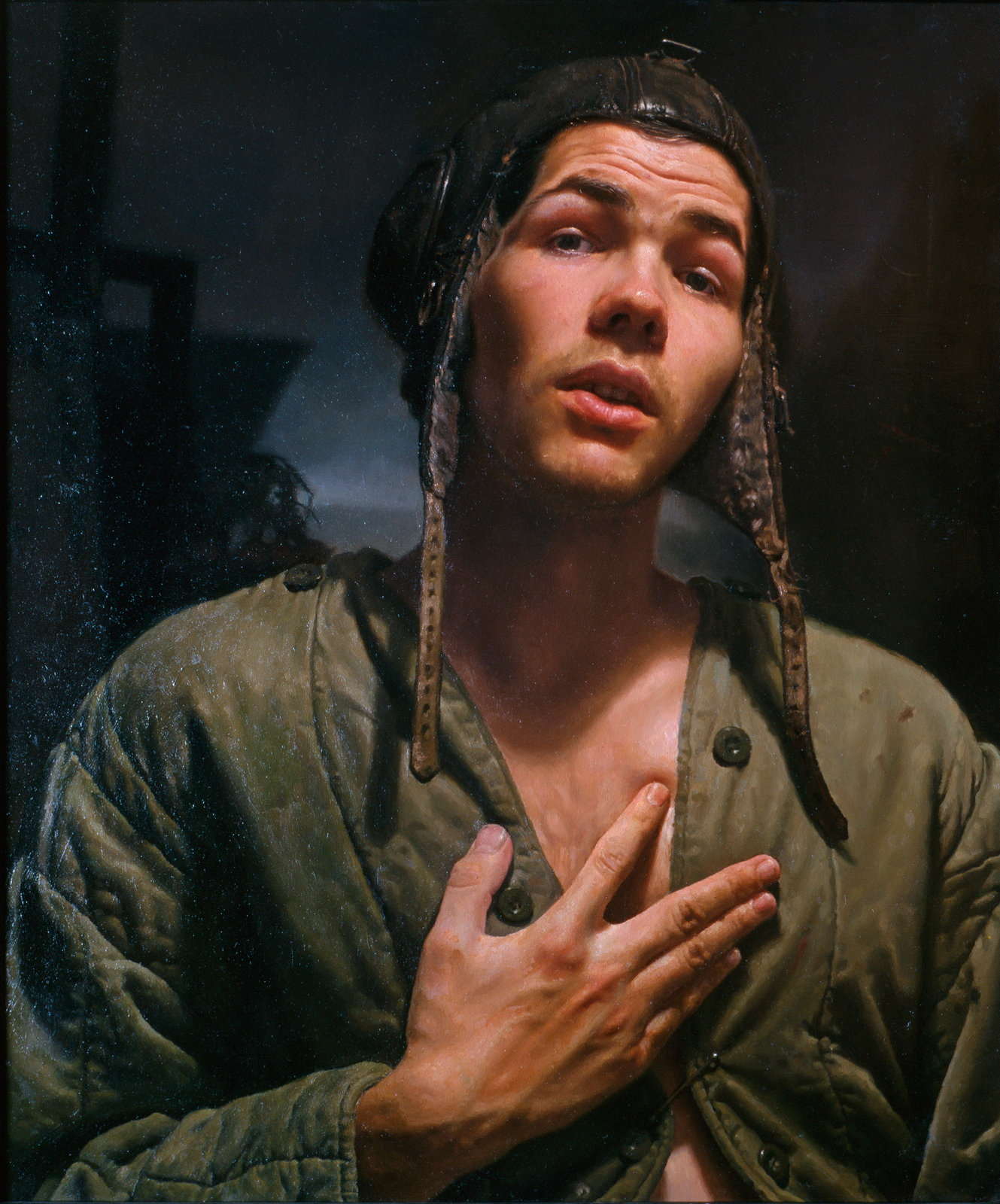
Autoportrait in Helmet, oil painting on panel, 60x50 cm, 1997-1998

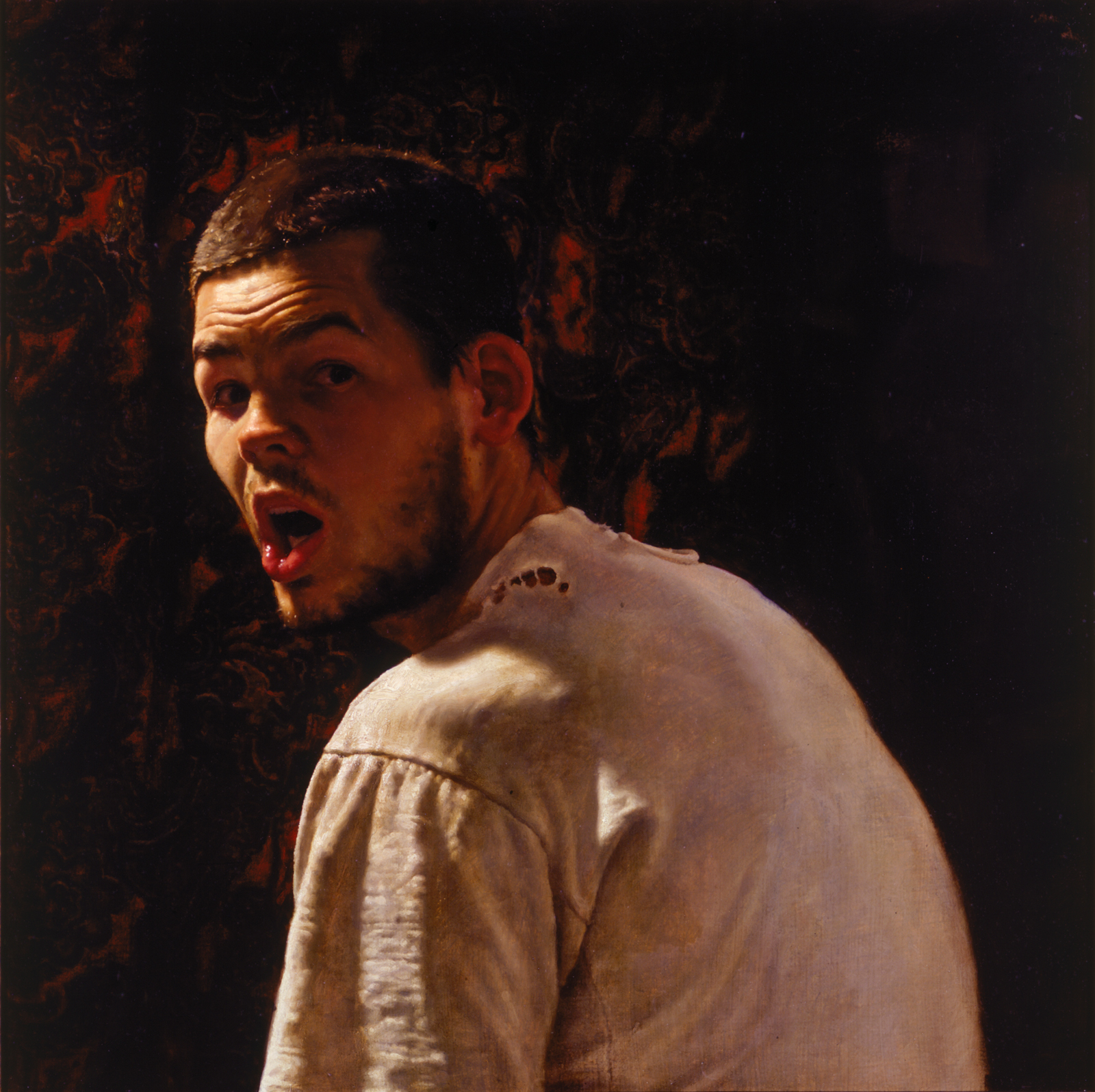
Vermeer's Saliva, oil painting on panel, 60x60 cm, 1997-1998

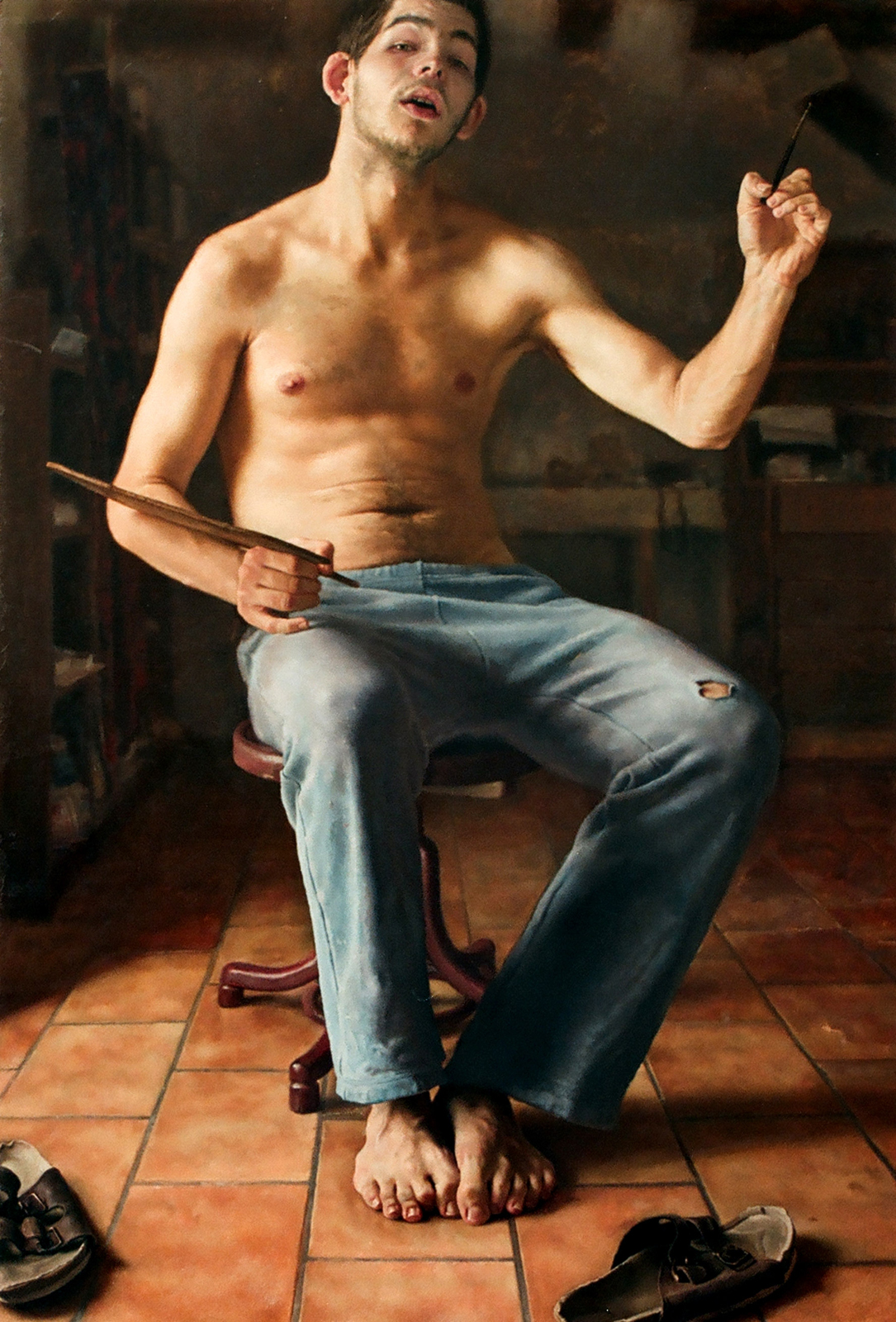
Large self-portrait, oil painting on panel, 150x110 cm, 1997-1998

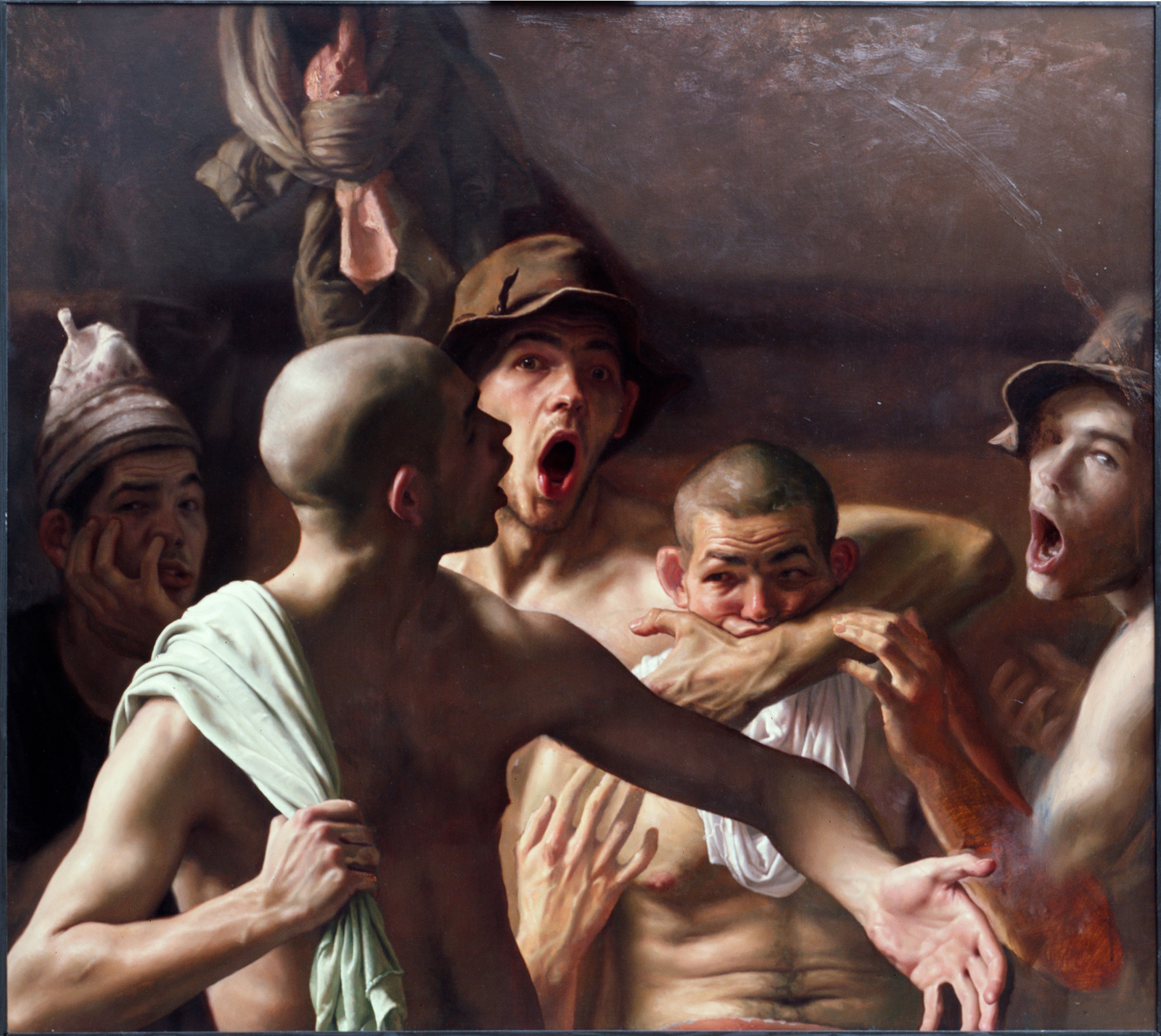
Clone, oil painting on panel, 100x130 cm, 1998-1999

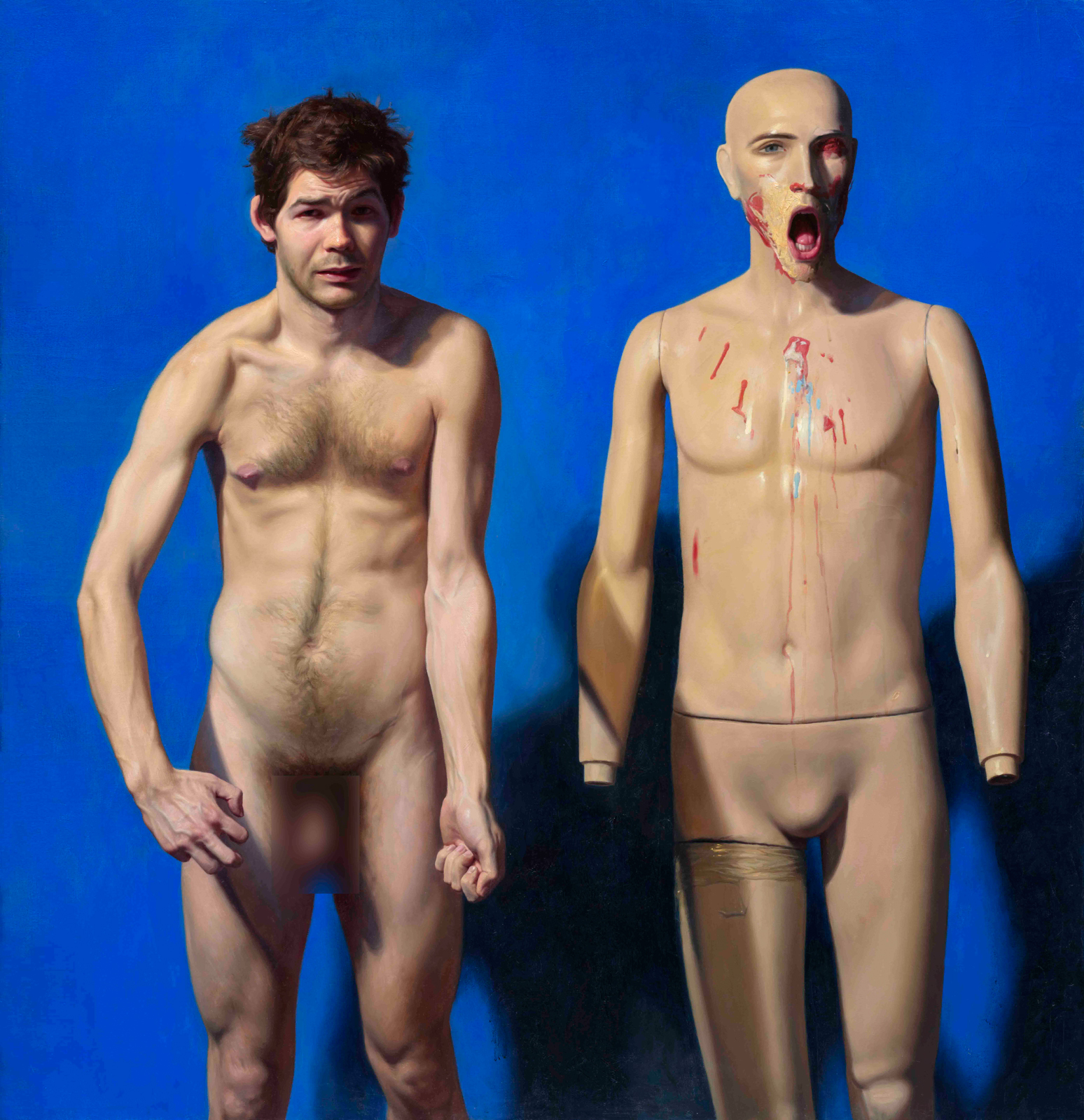
Inner Rage (self-portrait with dummy), oil painting on canvas, 150x150 cm, 1999-2000

At that time, he began to use a box with artificial lighting, modelled on Tintoretto, to study chiaroscuro and painted a series of nudes based on a live model and a loose series of figurative compositions on the theme of human relationships (1999-2001). The first of a pair of large-scale paintings, Scenes from Married Life (1999-2000), was purchased by the National Gallery in Prague in 2004, while the second composition on a similar theme, entitled Mary Magdalene, was created between 200-2001 and was exhibited at a major survey of European and American figurative painting, the Biennial Figurativas at the MEAM Museum in Barcelona (2019). Kubík enjoys multi-figural compositions, where he can use his technical skills and individual characterization of figures previously studied in preparatory sketches in the studio (Dinner in the Jordaens Style, 1998–1999, The Four Wise Men, 1999).

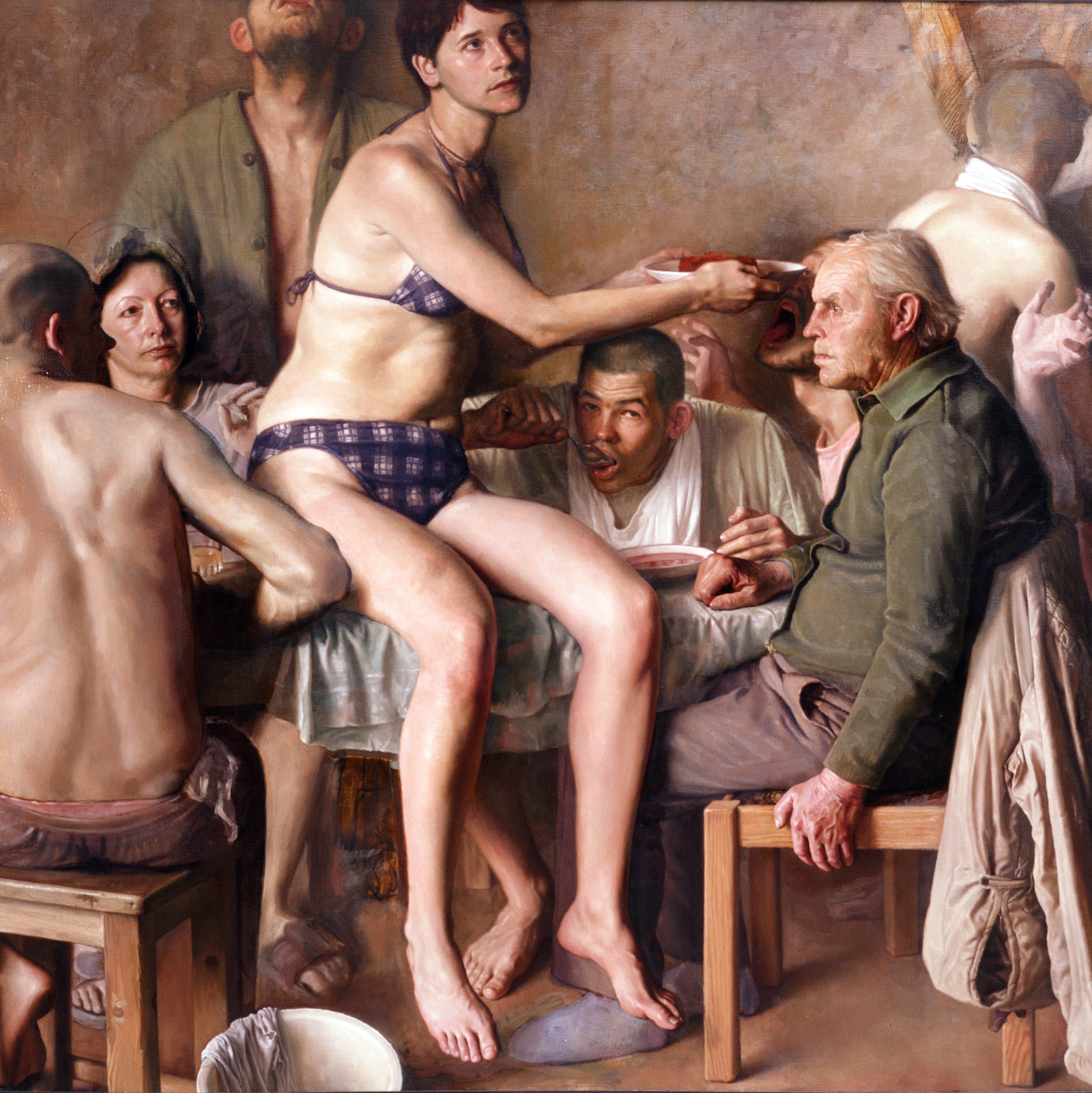
Dinner in Jordaens Style, oil painting on canvas, 150x170 cm, 1998–1999

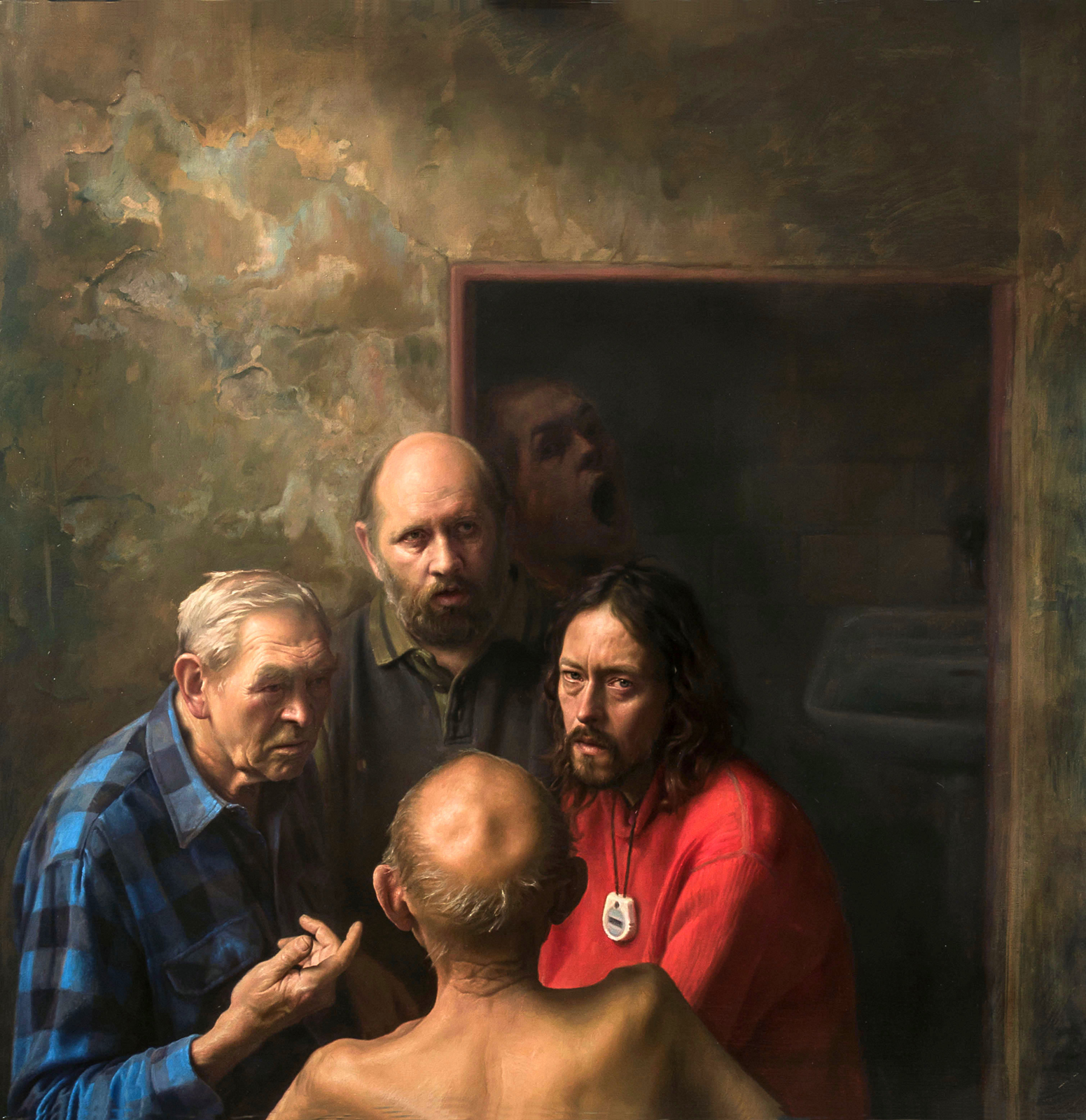
The Four Wise Men, oil on canvas, 150x150 cm, 1999

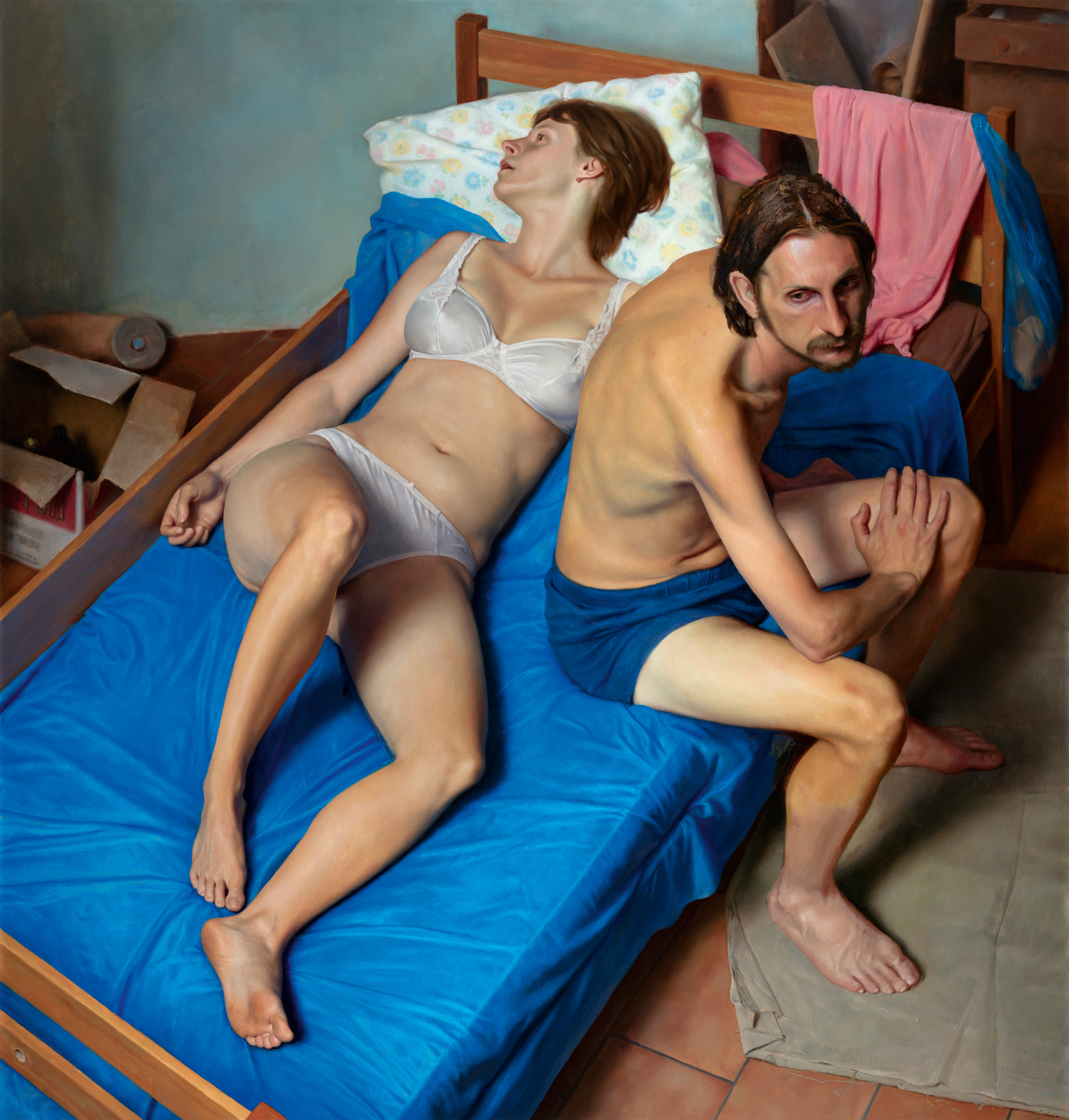
Scenes from Married Life, oil on canvas, 180x170 cm, 1999–2000, National Gallery Prague

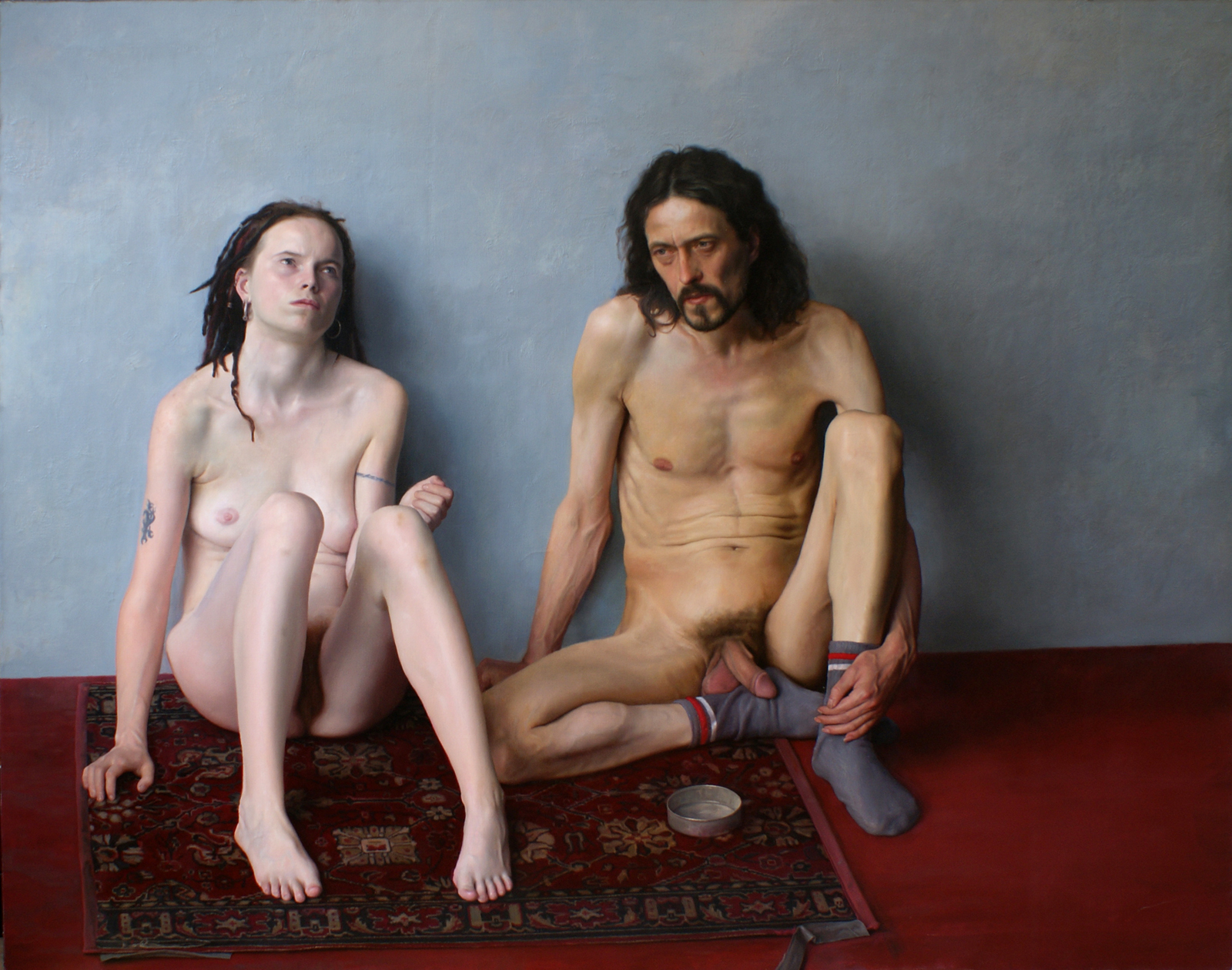
Mary Magdalene, oil painting on canvas, 160x195 cm, 2000–2001

In Portrait Document in the Renaissance Style, a series of paintings from 2020 to 2021, inspired by the early Renaissance portrait paintings of Albrecht Dürer and Hans Holbein, he creates sets of portraits of his contemporaries that would ultimately serve as a kind of time-lapse document. Two portraits from this series (David in Renaissance Style, 2020, Valeria, 2021) were selected for a competition held by The Royal Society of Portrait Painters in London, and the first of these won the Burke's Peerage Foundation award.

In the series Death and the Girl (2018), he used a white plaster cast of a face as a model which allows him to study the subtle nuances of relief under different lighting. This is a traditional academic discipline that introduced students to the ancient heritage and grisaille drawing technique. Yet the model itself evokes the tension between the impersonal plaster and the emotionally charged, romantic subject matter.

Tomáš Kubík often inserts some extraneous details into paintings, that are inspired by classical paintings and created with the same technique, to make it clear that they are contemporary works. Michelangelo's idealised male nudes from the ceiling of the Sistine Chapel, called Ignudi, served as compositional models for his hyperrealistic male nudes. To portray them, he somewhat provocatively chose contemporary human types from the fitness centre, with pronounced musculature, tattoos and uniformly tanned skin from the solarium. In doing so, the painter had to transpose the original mannerist composition, intended for the ceiling, into a real, believable and unobtrusive position.

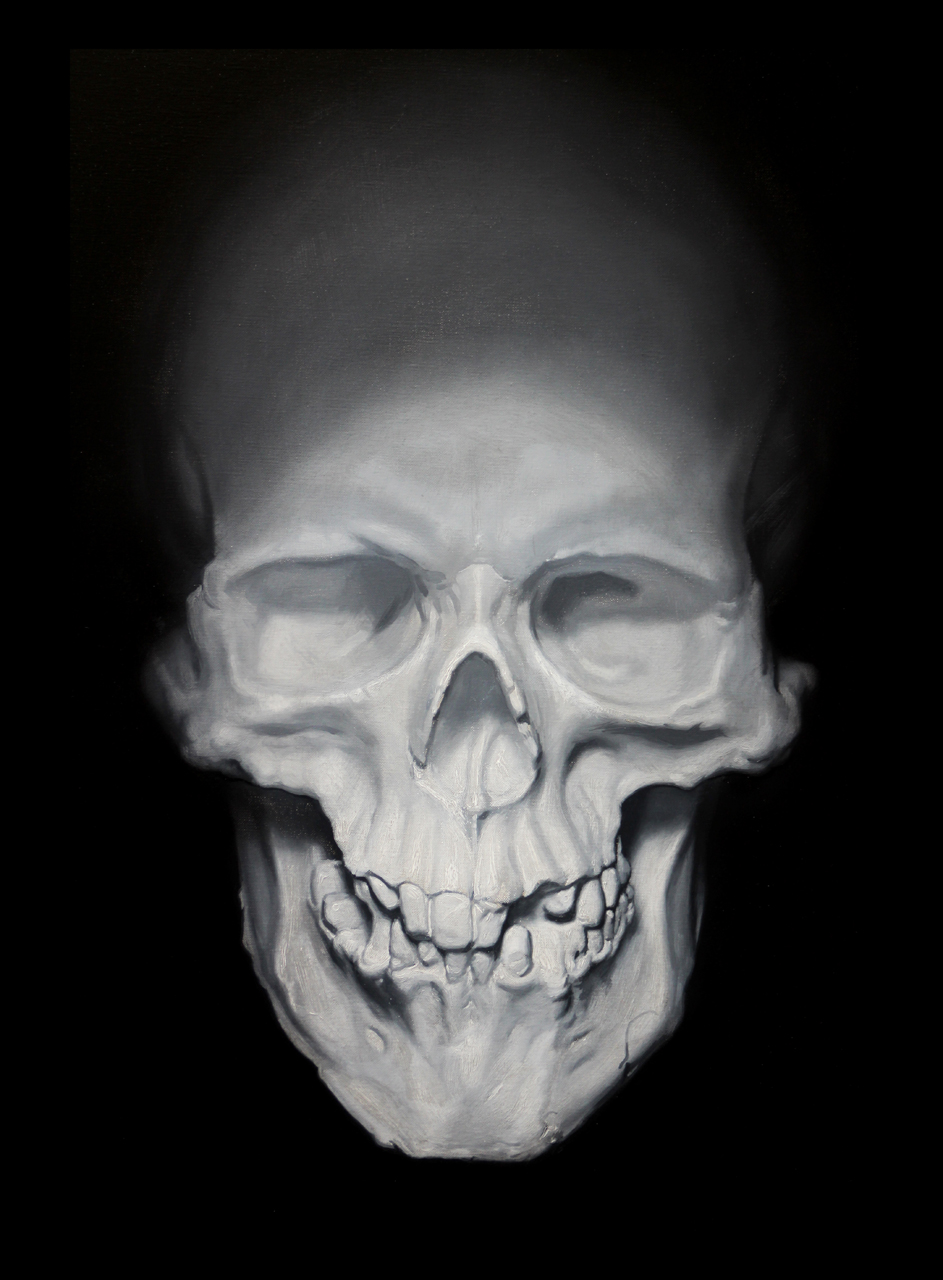
Memento mori from "Death and the Maiden" series, 2020, oil painting on canvas, 110x90 cm, 2020

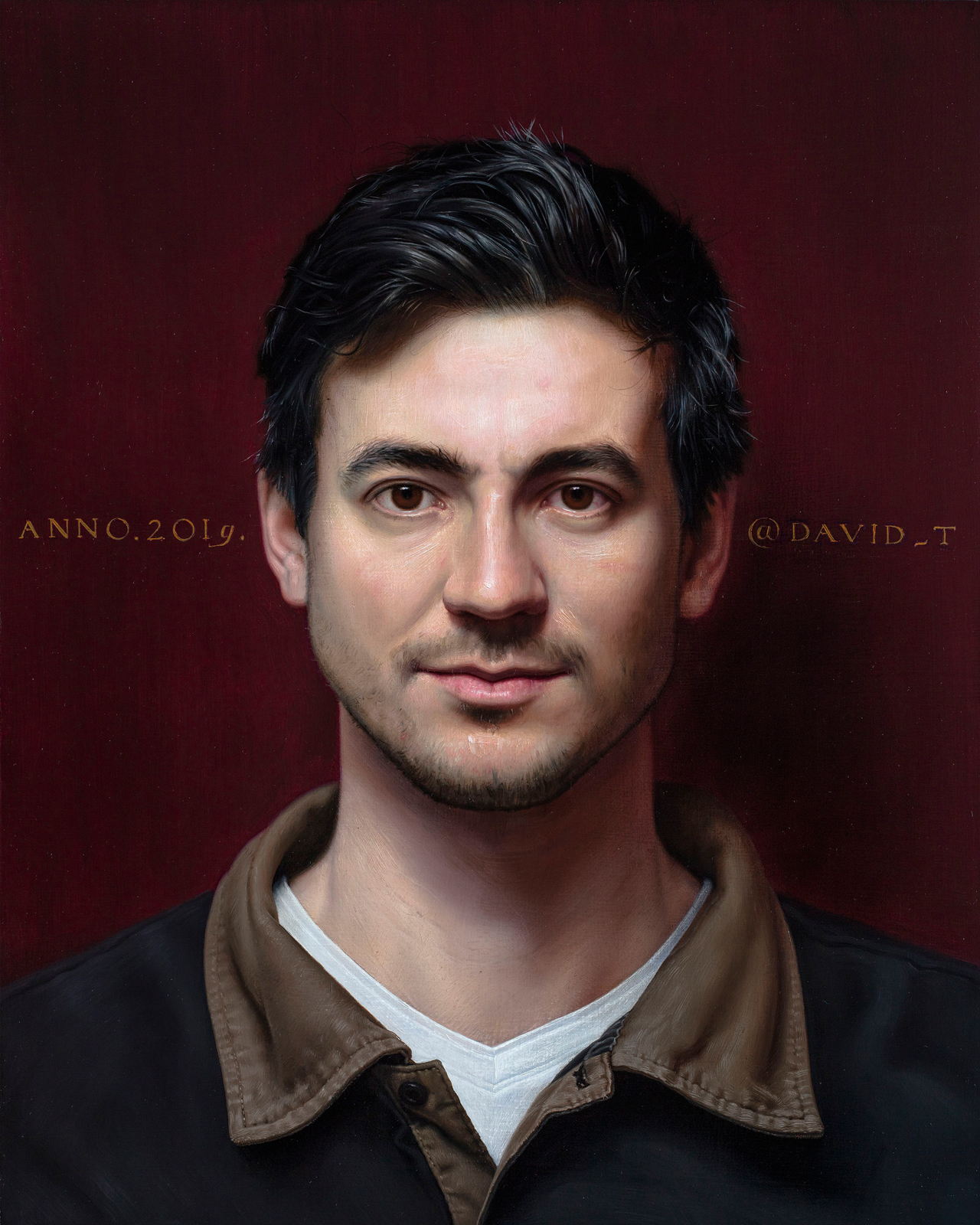
David in Renaissance Style from the series "Renaissance Documentary", oil painting on panel, 40x50 cm, 2019–2020

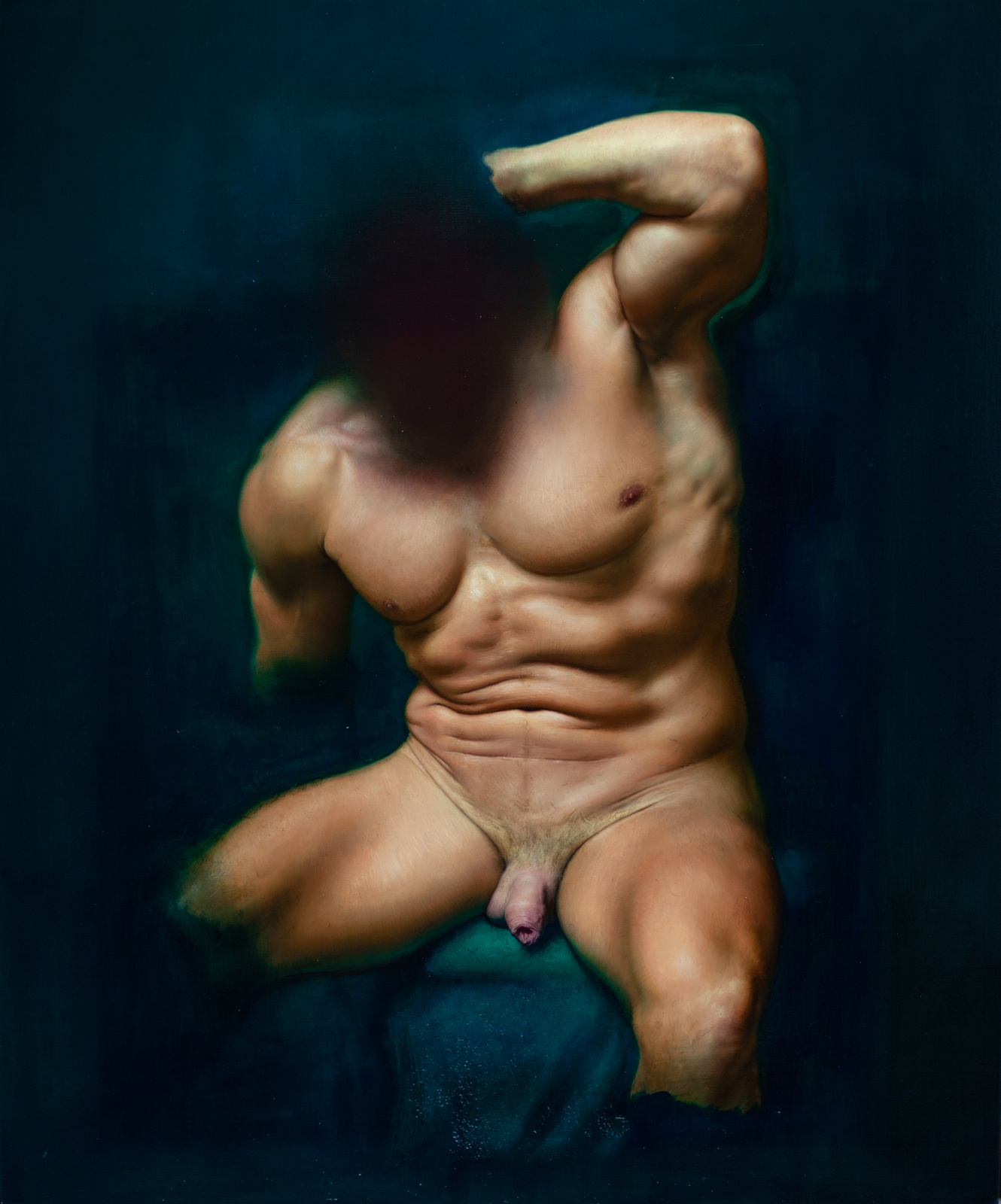
Torso Belvedere I, from the series "Michelangelo Project", oil painting on canvas, 120x100 cm, 2020

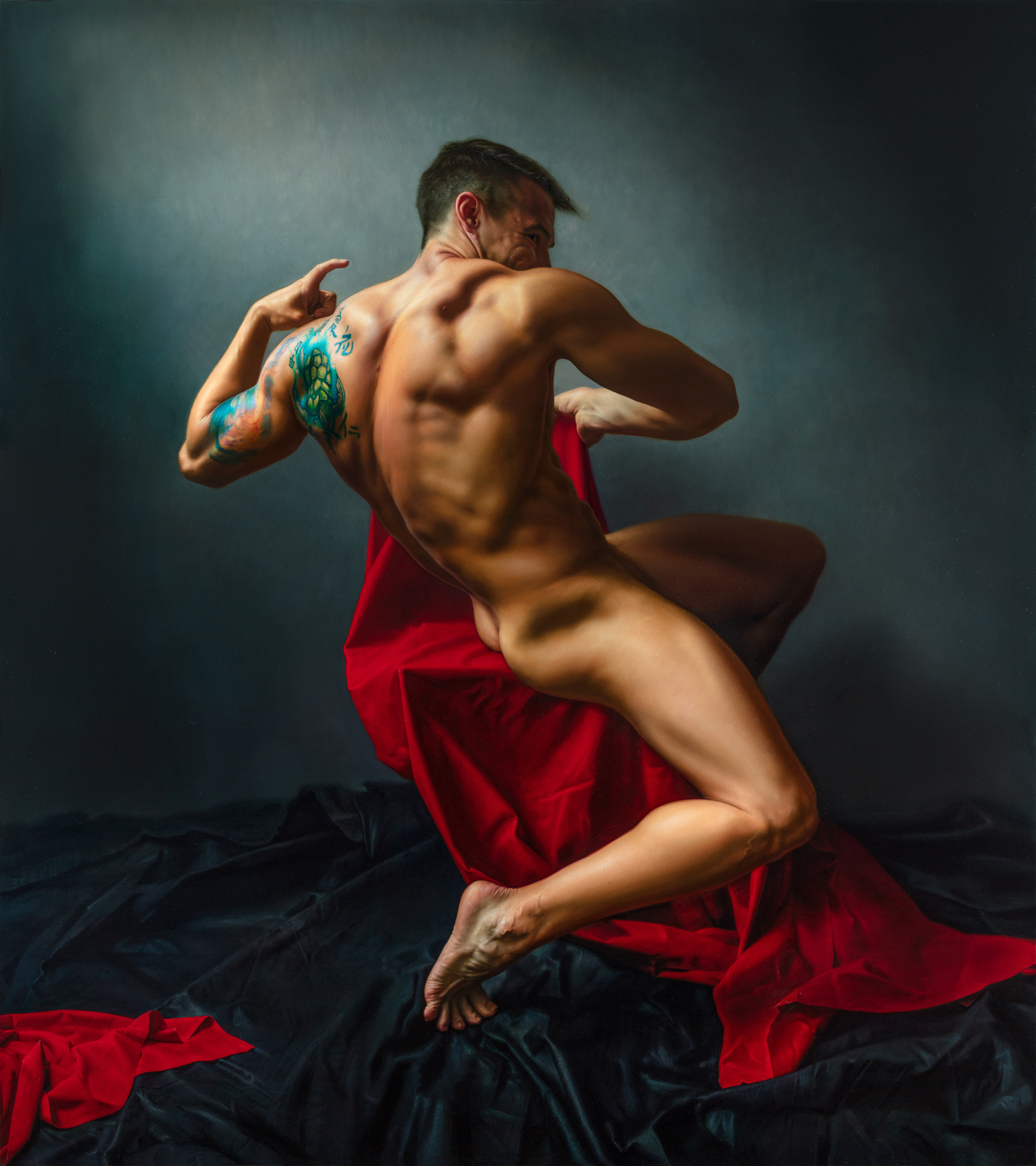
Ignudo I. from the series "Michelangelo Project", oil painting on canvas 160x180 cm, 2019–2021

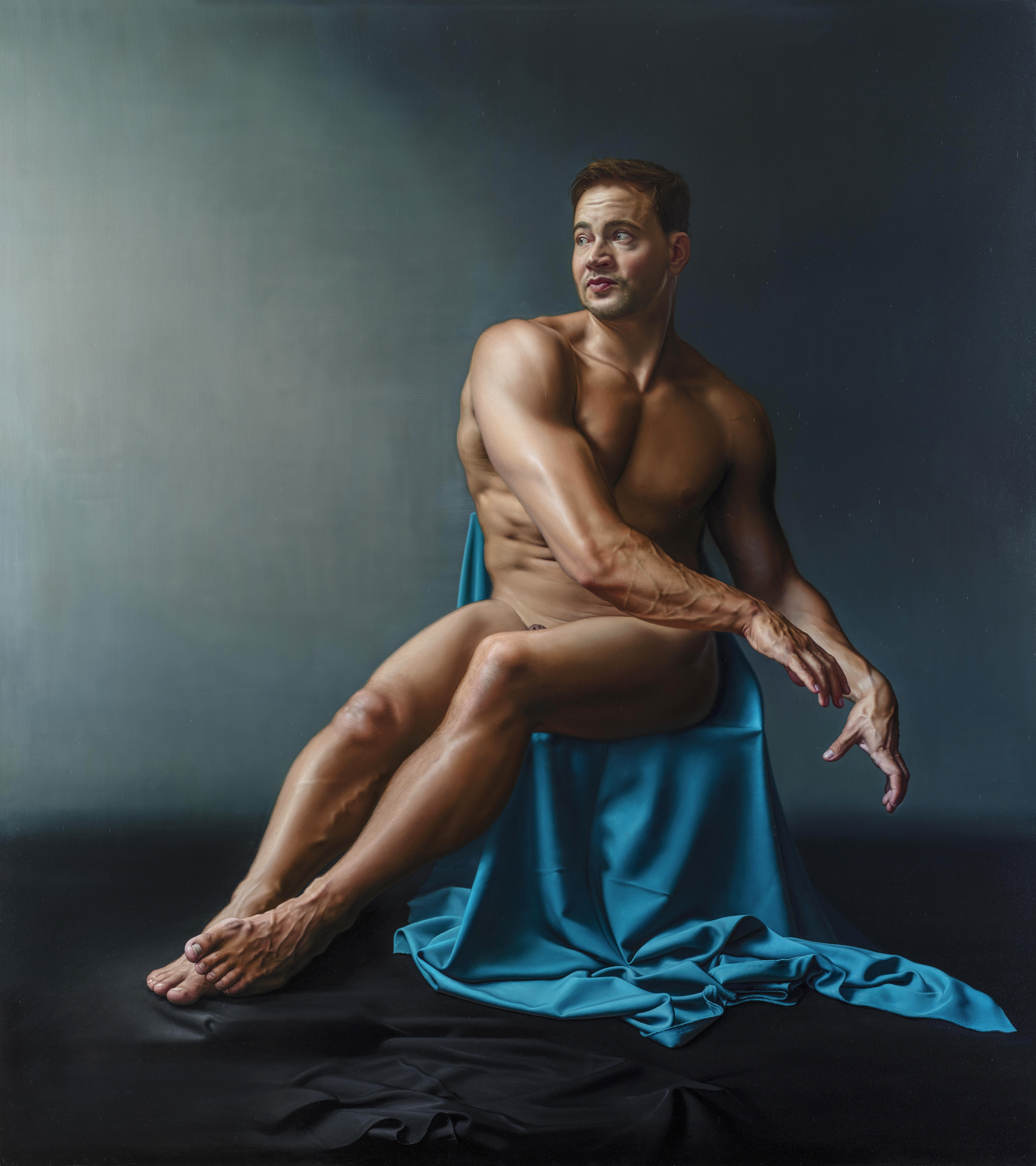
Ignudo II. from the series "Michelangelo Project", oil painting on canvas 160x180 cm, 2020–2021

=== Drawings ===
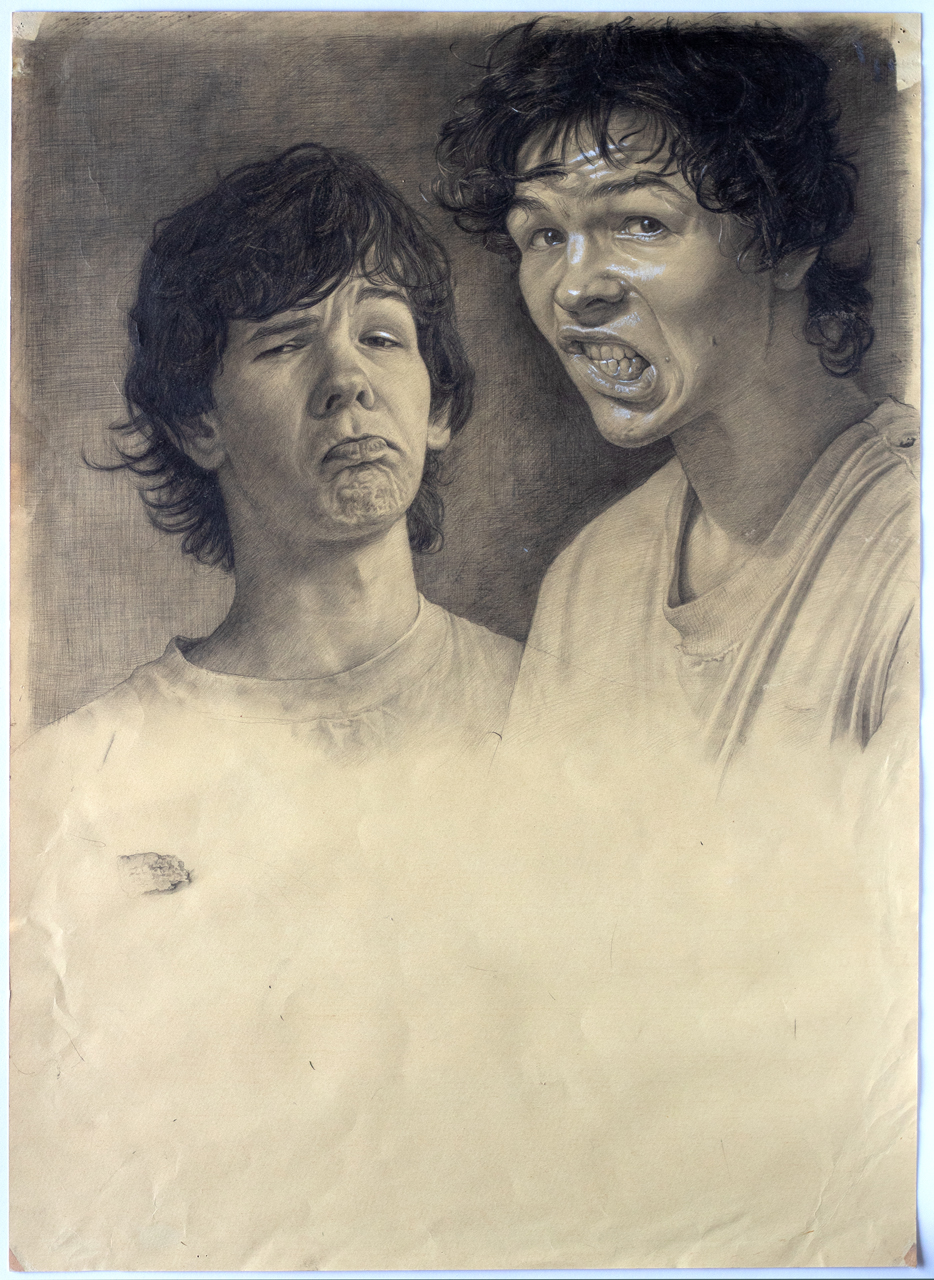
Self-portrait, pencil drawing 42x29 cm, 1995

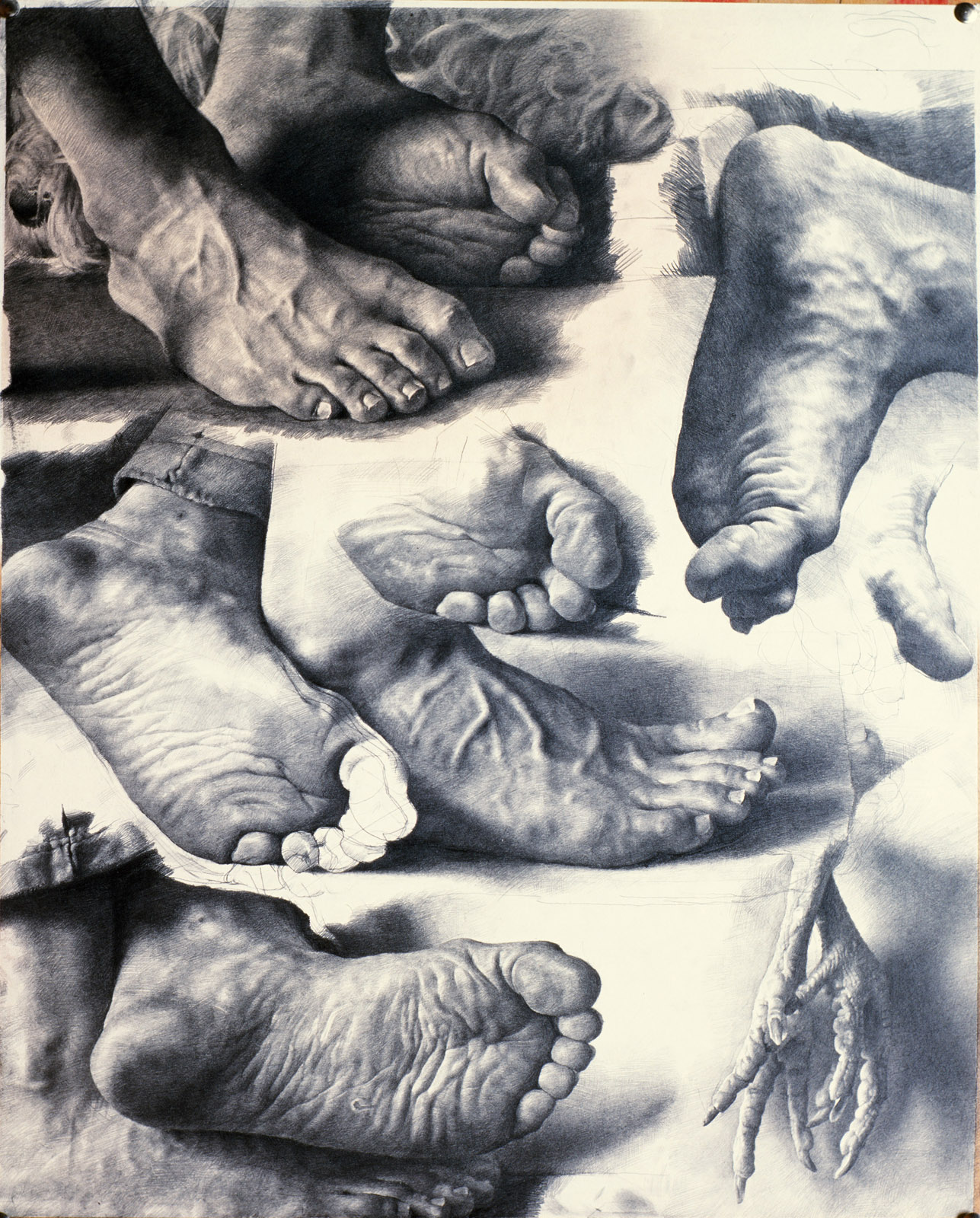
Legs, pencil drawing 42x29 cm, 1997

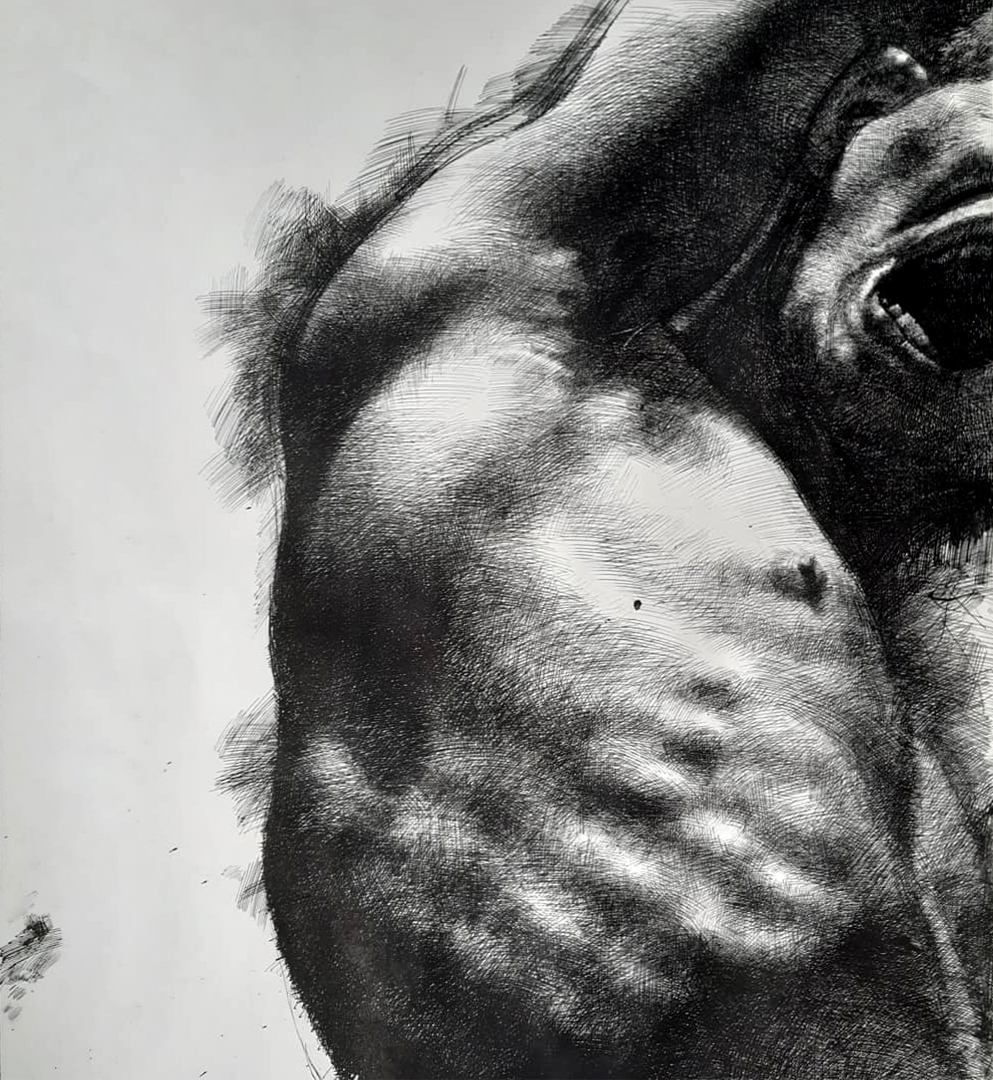
Torso I. pen drawing 29 x 42 cm, 1999

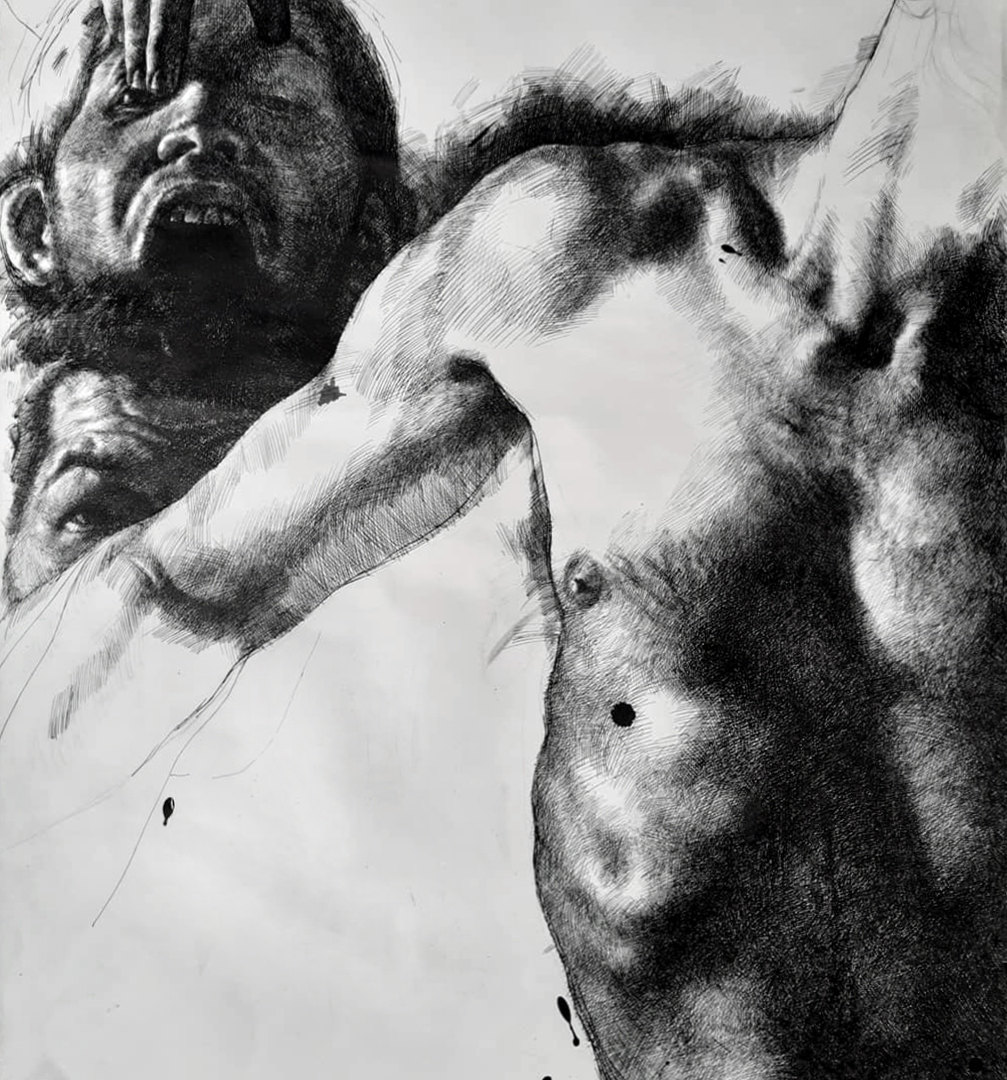
Torso II. pen drawing 29 x 42 cm, 1999

=== Representation in collections ===
- National Gallery in Prague
- Private collections in the Czech Republic and United States

=== Exhibitions ===
==== Author's ====
- 2002 Tomáš Kubík: Selected paintings and drawings, Design Lab Gallery, Miami, USA
- 2015 Tomáš Kubík: Drawings, Alina Gallery, Karlovy Vary, USA
- 2019 Tomáš Kubík: Drawings, Thoughts, Records..., Winter Refectory of the Royal Canonry of Premonstratensians at Strahov
- 2021 Tomáš Kubík: Michelangelo in Lockdown, Art Mosaic Gallery, Prague

==== Collective (selection) ====
- 1997 Panorama of Mannerism, Galerie U prstenu, Prague
- 1997/1998 The Last Picture, Rudolfinum Gallery, Prague
- 2000/2001 Současná minulost. Czech Postmodern Modernism 1960-2000, Alšova jihočeská galerie v Hluboká nad Vltavou, Regional Gallery of Highlands, Jihlava
- 2003 Academy of Fine Arts: Intermedia School of Professor Milan Knížák, Wortner House of the Alš South Bohemian Gallery, České Budějovice
- 2003 Nejmladší / The youngest: Přehlídka výmladného umění nejmladší generace z let 1995 - 2003 (Exhibition of the youngest Generation Art from 1995 - 2003), Veletržní palác, Praha
- 2004 Diplomanti AVU 2004, AVU Modern Gallery, Prague
- 2005 Easter, U prstenu Gallery, Prague
- 2005 Prague Studios, New Town Hall Gallery, Prague
- 2006 IV. Zlín Salon of the Young
- 2017 Fascinace skutečností: Hyperrealismus v české malbě / Fascination with Reality: Hyperrealism in Czech Painting, Museum of Art Olomouc - Museum of Modern Art, Olomouc
- 2019 Artista Art Spoon, Villa Baruchello, Porto Sant'Elpidio, Italy
- 2019-2020 Figurativas, MEAM Museum, Barcelona
- 2019-2020 It's Already the Worst, Galerie 90°, Černošice
- 2020 LA Art Show, Los Angeles, USA
- 2021 Royal Society of Portrait Painters Annual Exhibition, London, UK
- 2021 Figurativas 2021, MEAM Museum, Barcelona

== Sources ==
- Tomáš Kubík: Drawings, Thoughts, Records..., text by Jan Kříž, 66 p., Art Mozaika Gallery, Mozaika Society, Prague 2019
- Tomáš Kubík, texts by Josef Záruba - Pfeffermann, Tomáš Kubík, monograph 218 p., (Czech, English), Art Mozaika Gallery, Prague 2021, ISBN 978-80-908365-0-1
- Figurativas 21, 11 Concurso de pintura y escultura, Fundació de les Arts i els Artistes, MEAM, Barcelona 2021, ISBN 978-84-123831-2-6

=== Collective catalogues ===
- Zdeněk Beran, Patrik Šimon, Liberating Certainty (The Phenomenon of Classical Painting 90 years), Eminent Prague 1997
- Vlastimil Tetiva, Contemporary Past (Czech Postmodern Modernism 1960–2000), 176 p., Alšova jihočeská galerie v Hluboká nad Vltavou 2000, ISBN 80-85857-37-5
- Petr Pastrňák a kol., Nejmladší / The youngest (Přehlídka výmladného umění nejmladší generace z let 1995-2003 / Exhibition of the youngest Generation Art from 1995 to 2003), 156 p., National Gallery in Prague 2003, ISBN 80-7035-199-3
- Karolína Bayerová, Iva Nesvadbová, Lubomír Voleník, Art Prague (Veletrh současného umění / Contemporary Art Fair), 68 s., ART PRAGUE o.s. 2003
- Milan Knížák, Academy of Fine Arts in Prague (Intermedia School of Professor Milan Knížák), 40 p., Alšova jihočeská galerie v Hluboká nad Vltavou 2003, ISBN 80-85857-65-0
- Michael Rittstein, Graduates of AVU 2004, 60 p.
- Jan Kříž, Nudes in Action (Exhibition of Graduates of Prof. Zdeněk Beran's Studio of Classical Painting), 20 p., ISBN 80-239-5736-8
- Jan Kříž, Prague Studios, 84 p., Galerie U prstenu 2005
- Ludvík Ladislav Ševeček, IV. Zlínský salon mladých / Zlín Youth Salon (První společná přehlídka českých a slovenských umělců do třiceti let / The first Joint Survey of Czech and Slovak Artists under the Age of Thirty), 144 p., Regional Gallery of Fine Arts in Zlín, p. o. 2006, ISBN 80-85052-63-6
- Barbora Kundračíková (ed.), Fascinace skutečností / Fascination with Reality (Hyperrealismus v české malbě / Hyperrealism in Czech Painting), 282 p., Museum of Art Olomouc 2017, ISBN 978-80-88103-21-9
